= The Masked Singer Brasil season 2 =

Season of Brazilian television series

The Masked Singer Brasil
- Season 2
- Starring: Eduardo Sterblitch; Rodrigo Lombardi; Taís Araújo; Tatá Werneck
- Hosted by: Ivete Sangalo; Priscilla Alcantara
- No. of contestants: 16
- Winner: David Junior as "Dragão"
- Runner-up: Thiago Fragoso as "Camaleão"
- No. of episodes: 13

Release
- Original network: TV Globo
- Original release: January 23 – April 24, 2022

Season chronology
- ← Previous; Season 1 Next → Season 3

The second season of The Masked Singer Brasil premiered on January 23, 2022, on TV Globo and concluded on April 24, 2022.

== Hosts and panelists ==
Singer Ivete Sangalo returns as host while Priscilla Alcantara (the previous seasons winner) serves as a backstage interviewer. The panelists include actor Rodrigo Lombardi, actress Taís Araújo and comedian Eduardo Sterblitch in addition comedian Tatá Werneck joined the panel for the second season, replacing Simone Mendes.

=== Guest panelists ===
| Episode | Name | Occupation |
|---|---|---|
| 1 | Sorocaba | Singer |
| 2 | Roberta Miranda | Singer |
| 3 | Nicolas Prattes | Actor |
| 4 | Péricles | Singer |
| 5 | Teresa Cristina | Singer |
| 6 | Isis Valverde | Actress |
| 7 | Luísa Sonza | Singer |
| 8 | Ana Carolina | Singer |
| 9 | Xuxa | Entertainer |
| 10 | Patricia Poeta | Journalist |
| 11 | Ferrugem | Singer |
| 12 | Daniela Mercury | Singer |
| 13 | Chay Suede | Actor |

== Contestants ==
Results
| Stage name | Celebrity | Occupation | Episodes | | | | | | | | | | | | | |
| Stage name | Celebrity | Occupation | 1 | 2 | 3 | 4 | 5 | 6 | 7 | 8 | 9 | 10 | 11 | 12 | 13 | |
| Stage name | Celebrity | Occupation | 1 | 2 | 3 | 4 | 5 | 6 | 7 | 8 | 9 | 10 | 11 | 12 | A | B |
|---|---|---|---|---|---|---|---|---|---|---|---|---|---|---|---|---|
| Dragão (Dragon) | David Junior | Actor | | WIN | | WIN | | RISK | SAFE | WIN | BEST | IMM | WIN | WIN | WIN | WINNER |
| Camaleão (Chameleon) | Thiago Fragoso | Actor | | WIN | | WIN | | WIN | SAFE | WIN | WIN | WIN | WIN | SAFE | SAFE | RUNNER-UP |
| Leoa (Lioness) (WC) | Lucy Alves | Singer/Actress | | | | | RISK | | WIN | WIN | WIN | WIN | RISK | RISK | THIRD | |
| Abacaxi (Pineapple) | Isabel Fillardis | Actress | RISK | | RISK | | WIN | | SAFE | RISK | RISK | RISK | RISK | OUT | | |
| Lampião & Maria Bonita | MC Guimê | Singers | WIN | | BEST | | IMM | | SAFE | WIN | RISK | WIN | WIN | OUT | | |
| Lampião & Maria Bonita | Lexa | Singers | WIN | | BEST | | IMM | | SAFE | WIN | RISK | WIN | WIN | OUT | | |
| Pavão (Peacock) | Negra Li | Singer | | RISK | | BEST | | IMM | SAFE | RISK | RISK | RISK | OUT | | | |
| Borboleta (Butterfly) | Thaeme Mariôto | Singer | WIN | | RISK | | RISK | | WIN | RISK | WIN | OUT | | | | |
| Caranguejo (Crab) | Aline Wirley | Singer | | RISK | | RISK | | RISK | BEST | IMM | OUT | | | | | |
| Cachorro (Dog) (WC) | Amaral | Retired footballer | | | | | | WIN | SAFE | OUT | | | | | | |
| Ursa (Bear) | Daiane dos Santos | Former gymnast | WIN | | WIN | | WIN | | WD (Note: Ursa was forced to be removed from the competition due to its portrayer (Daiane dos Santos) testing positive for COVID-19.) | | | | | | | |
| Robô (Robot) | Juan Paiva | Actor | | WIN | | RISK | | OUT | | | | | | | | |
| Coxinha | Heloísa Périssé | Actress | RISK | | WIN | | OUT | | | | | | | | | |
| Boto | Beto Barbosa | Singer | | RISK | | OUT | | | | | | | | | | |
| Motoqueira (Biker) | Letícia Colin | Actress | RISK | | OUT | | | | | | | | | | | |
| Bebê (Baby) | Dudu Nobre | Singer | | OUT | | | | | | | | | | | | |
| Rosa (Rose) | Gretchen | Singer | OUT | | | | | | | | | | | | | |

The masked singer won their face-off.
The masked singer lost their face-off.
The masked singer was safe from elimination.
The masked singer was eliminated from the competition and unmasked upon their elimination.
The masked singer withdrew from the competition without a vote.
The masked singer did not perform.
The masked singer took third place.
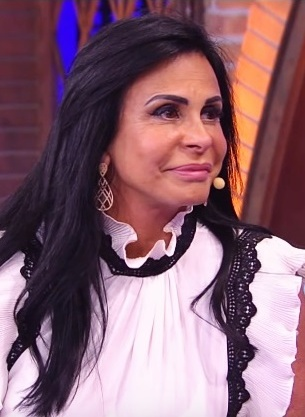
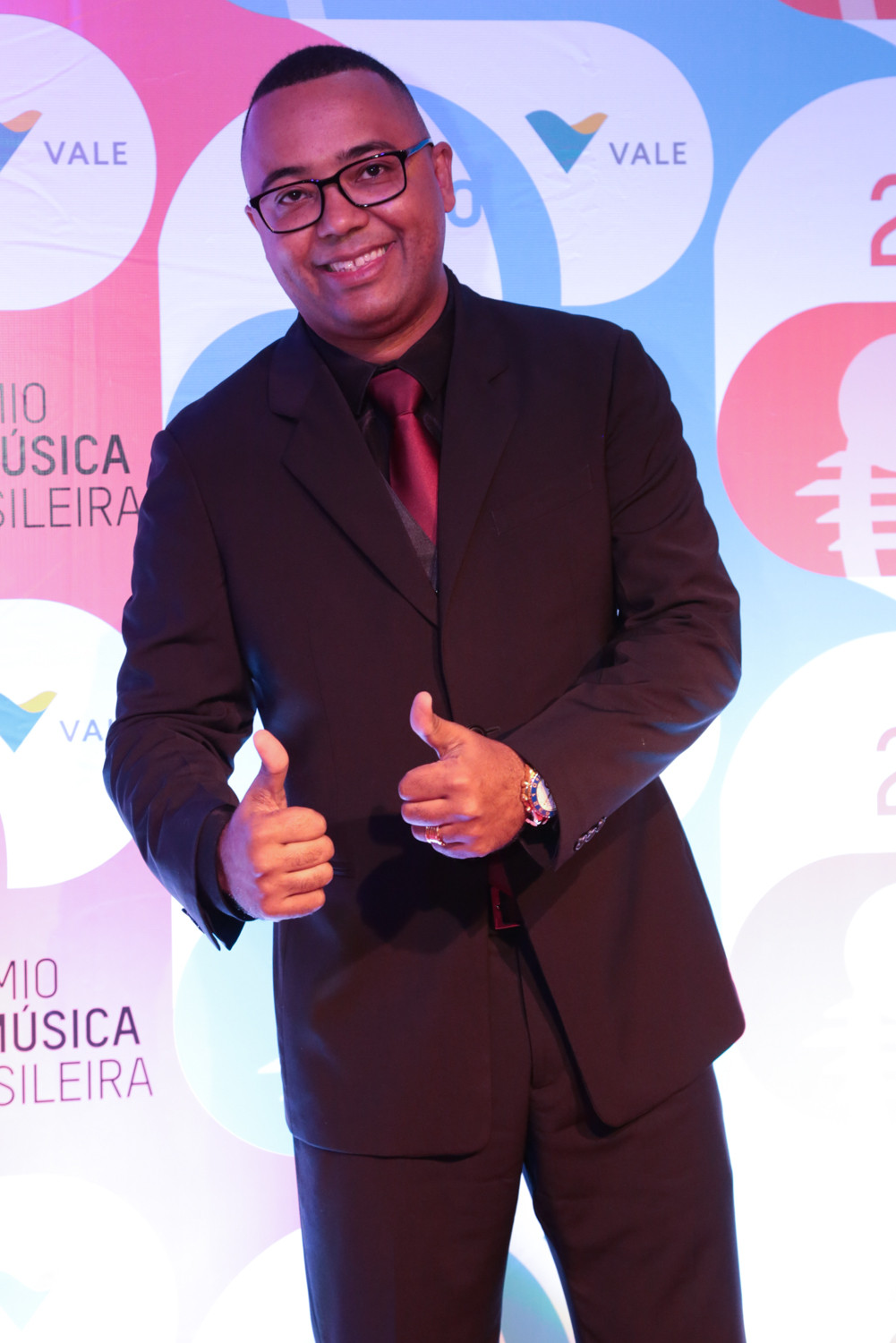
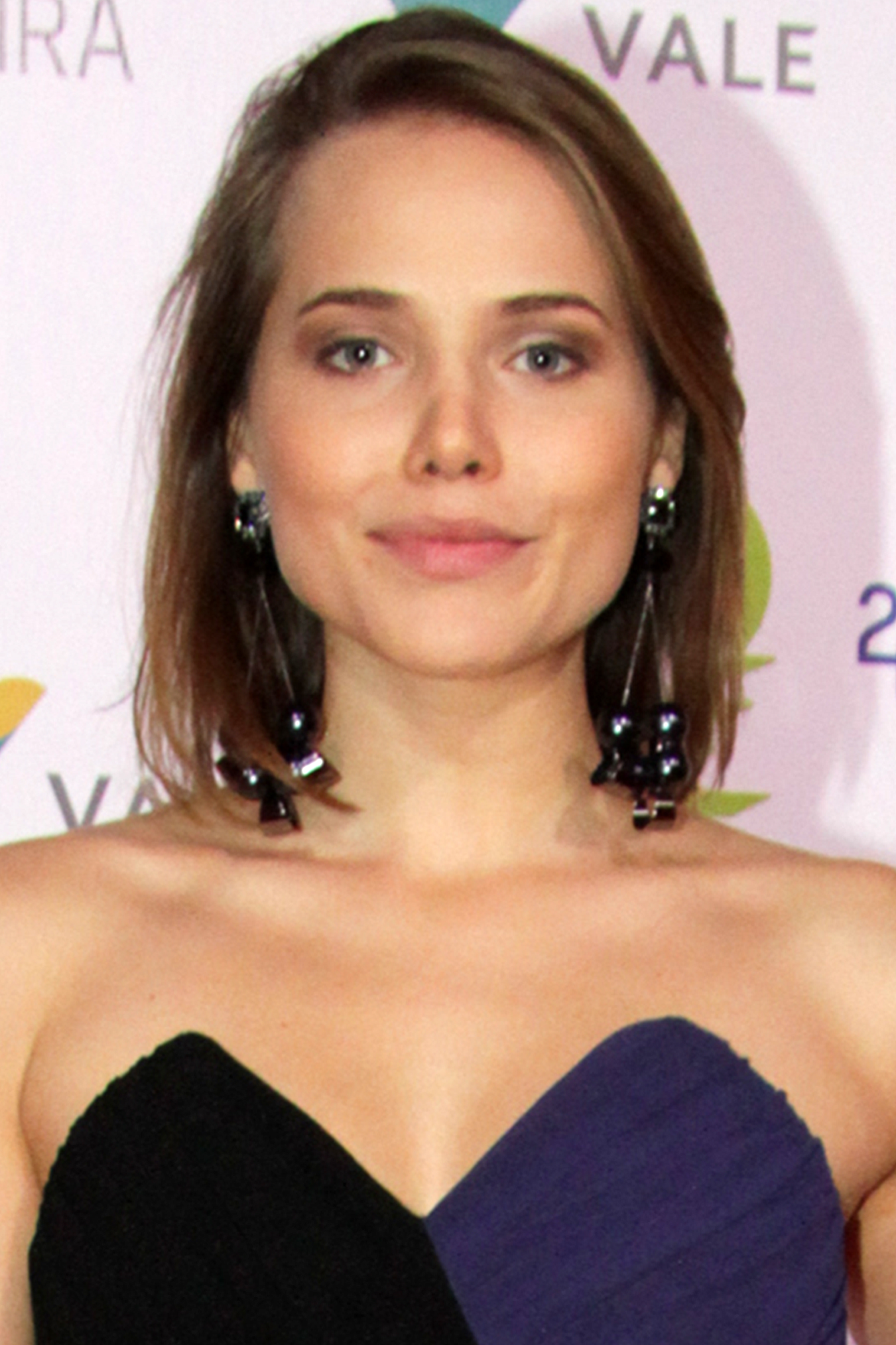

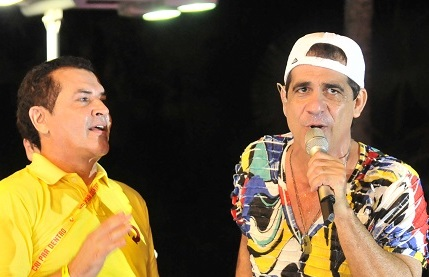
Beto Barbosa on the left side.

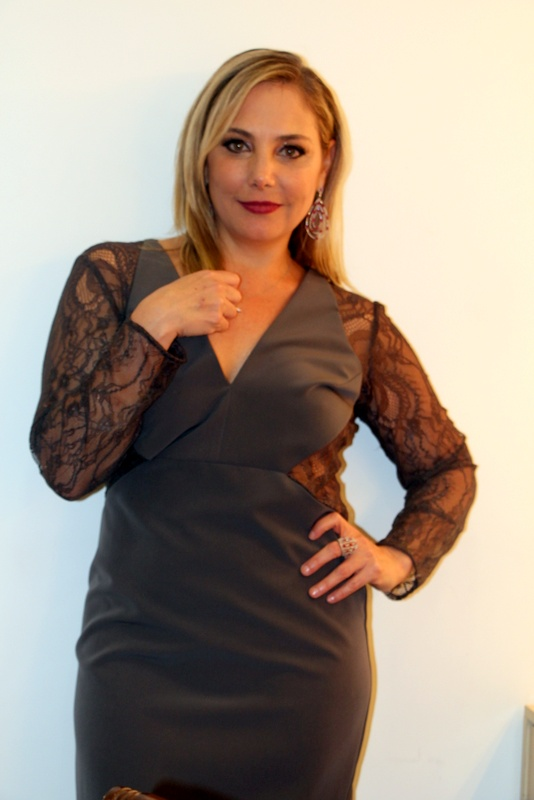
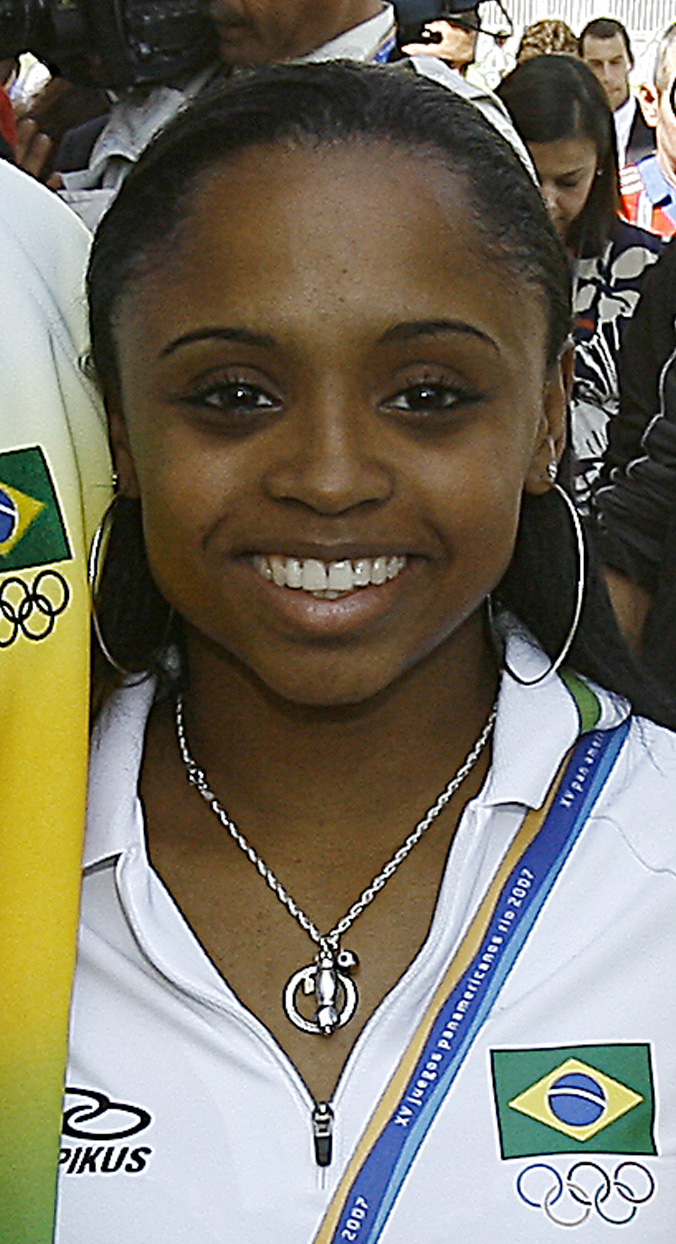
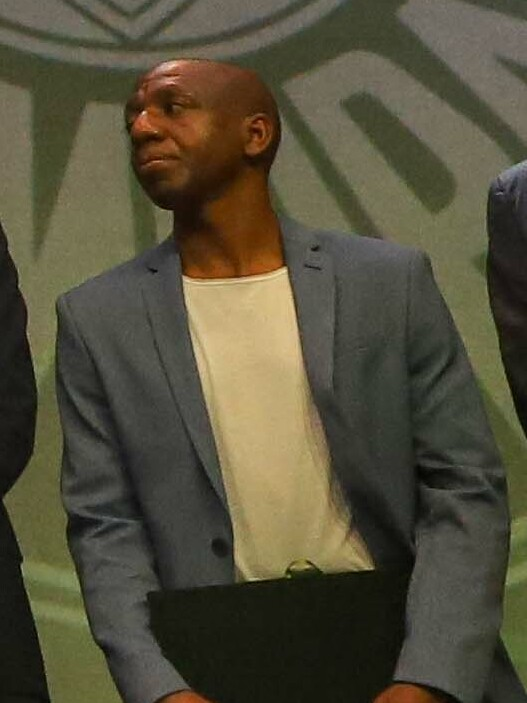
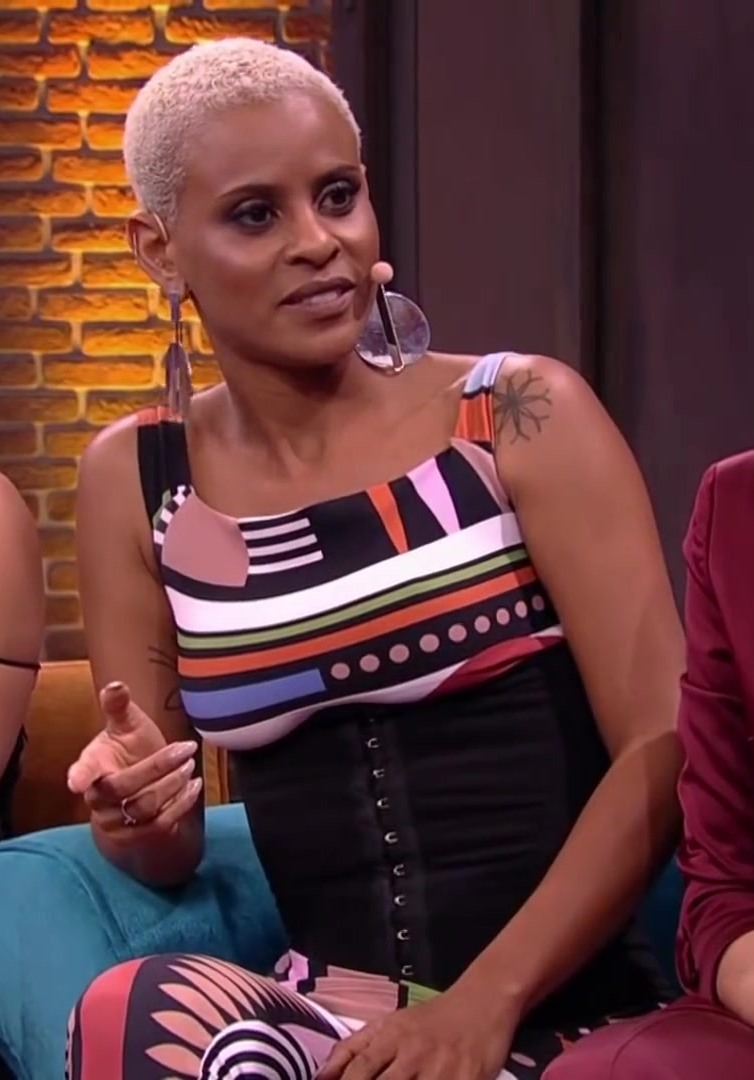
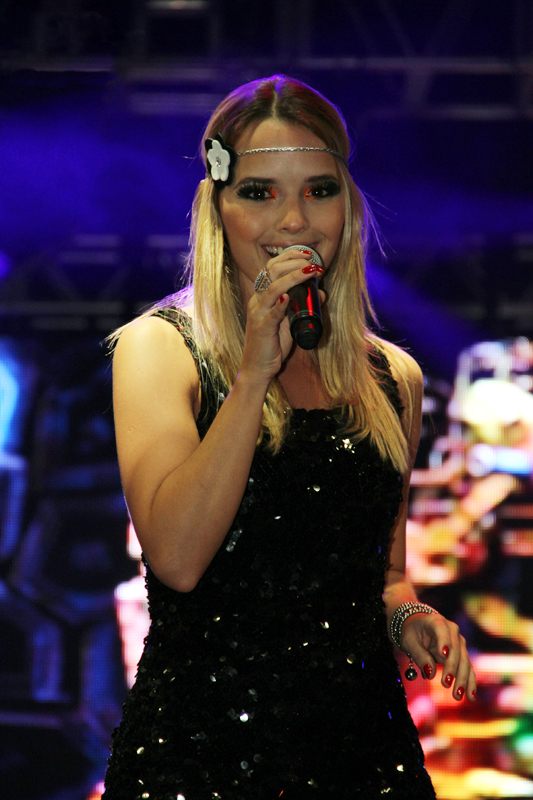
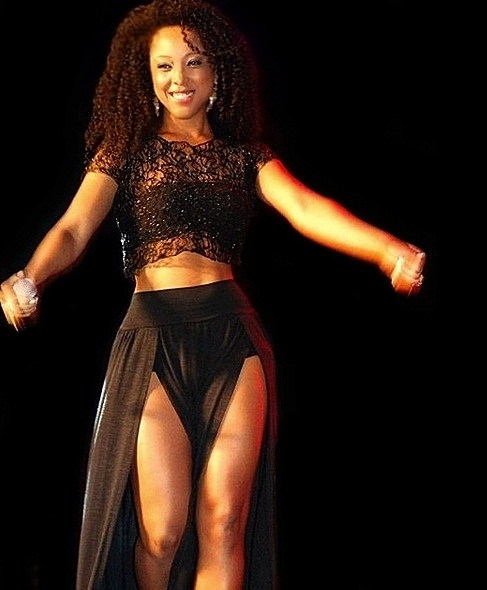
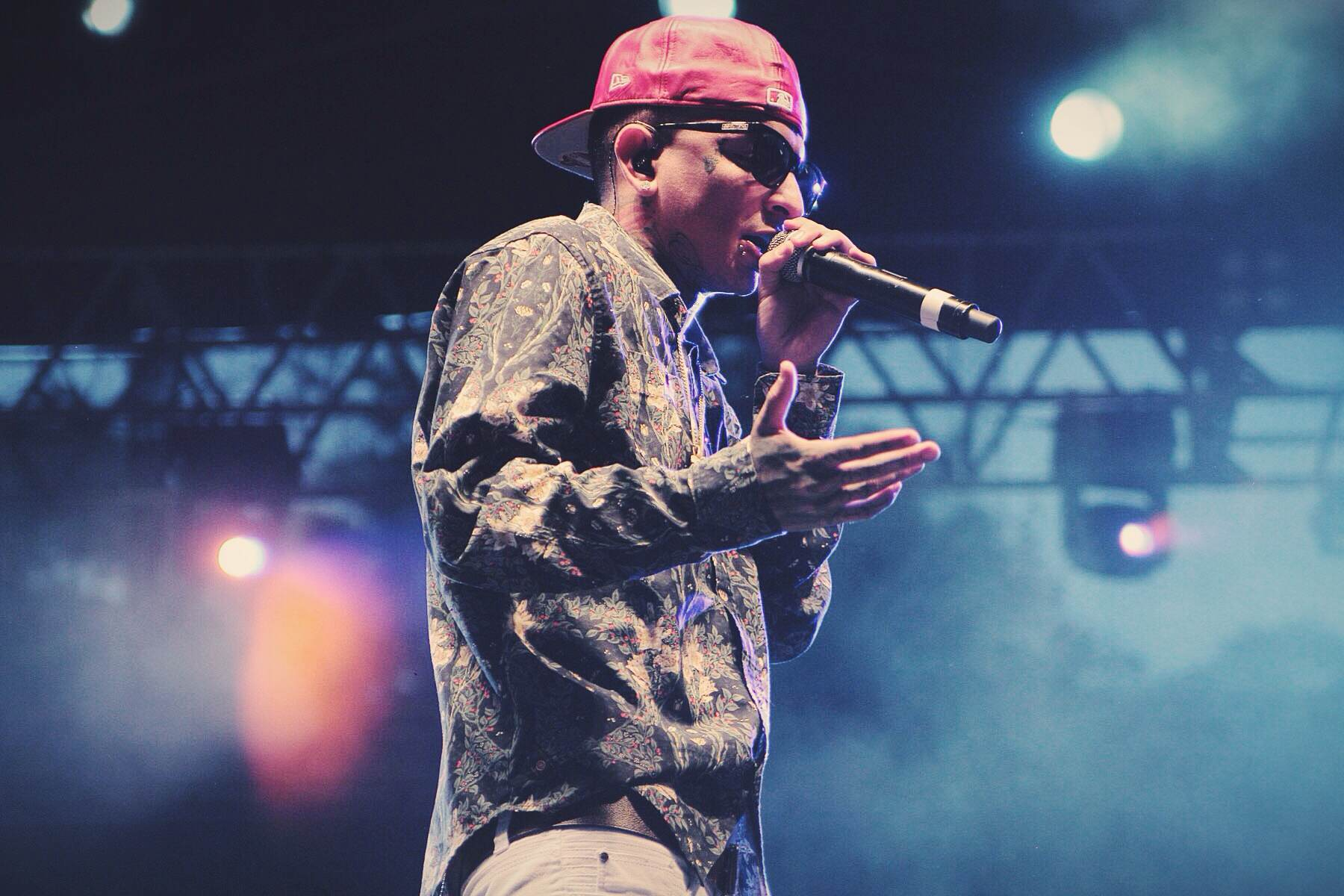
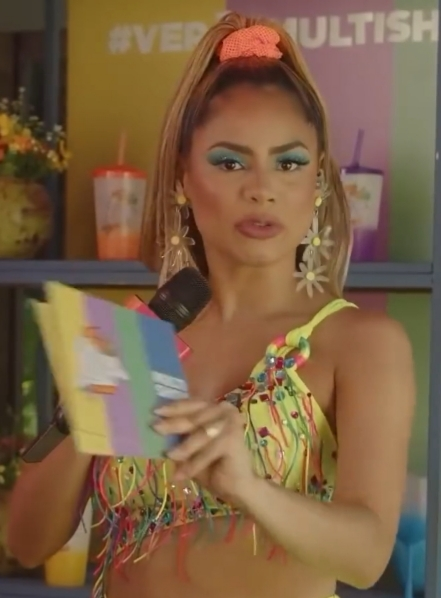
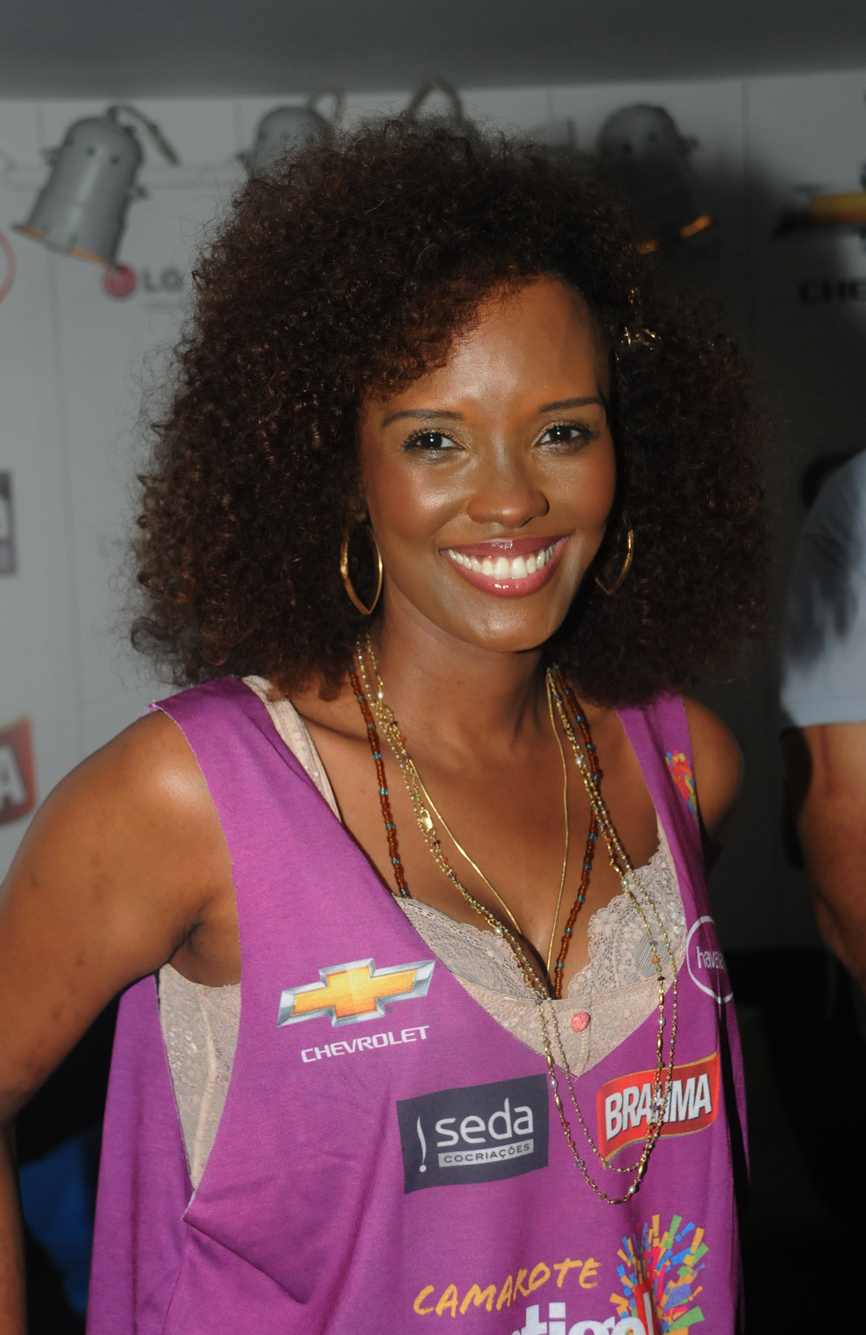
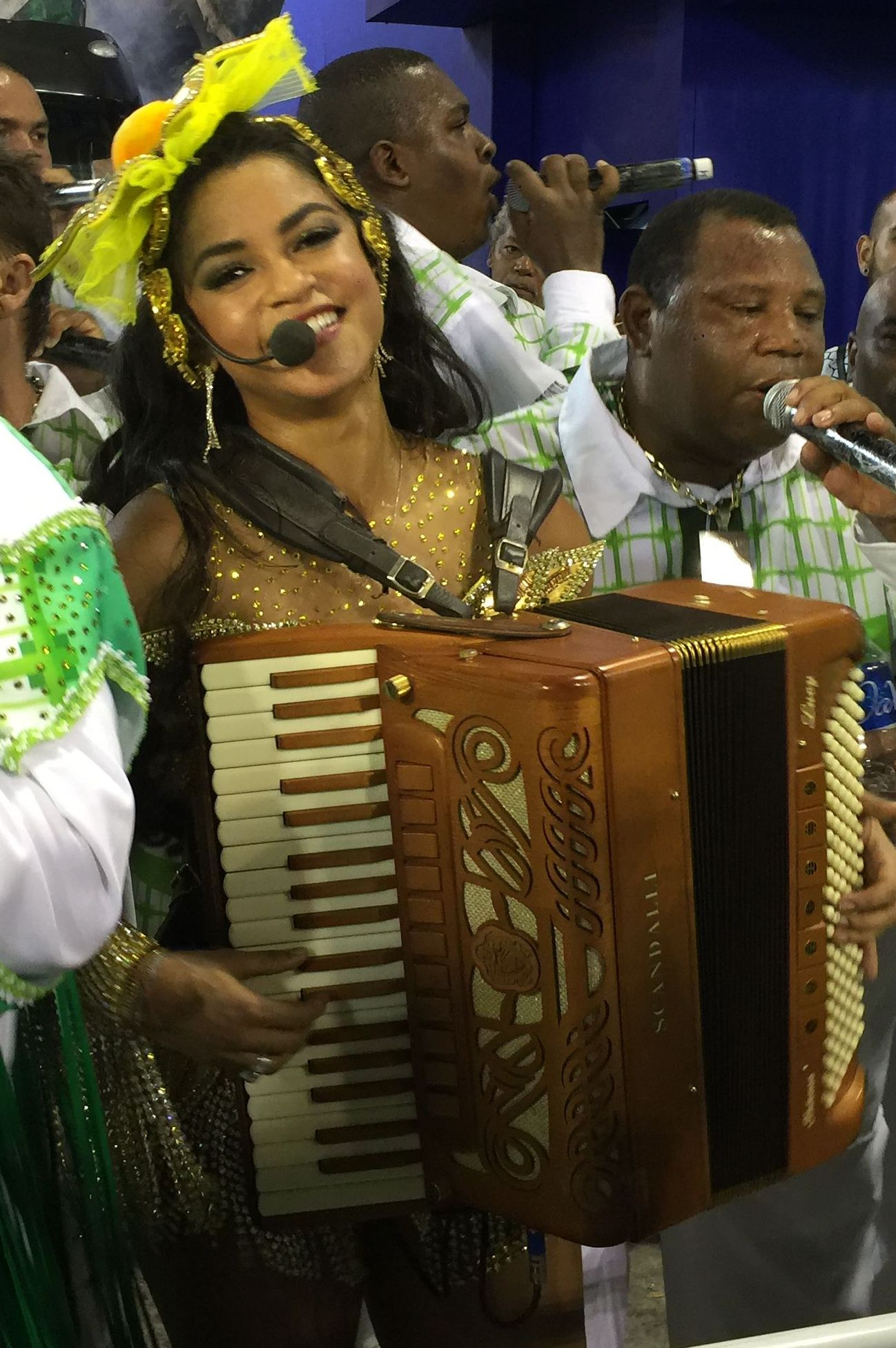
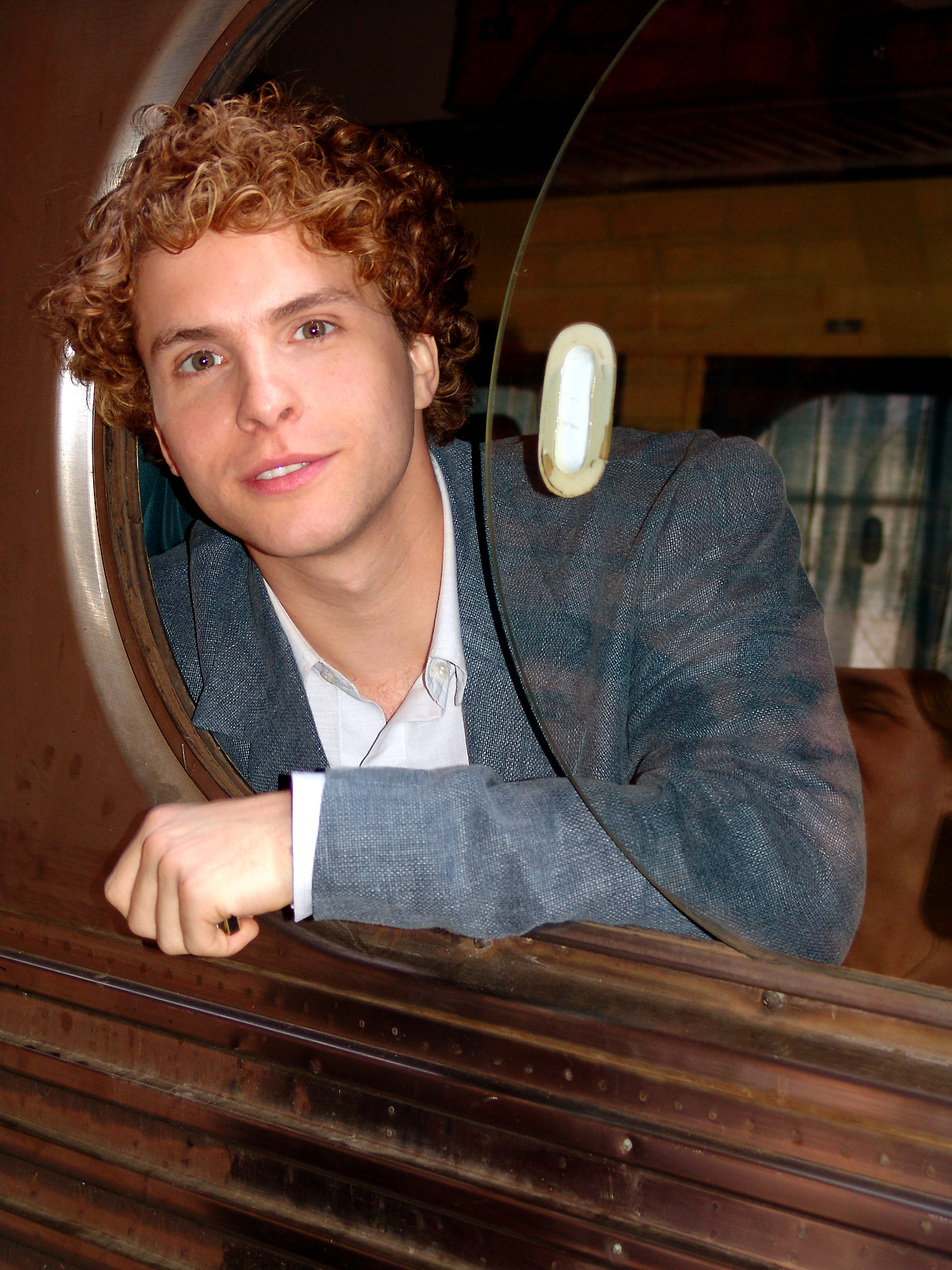
The celebrities who competed in the second season of The Masked Singer Brasil, pictured in order of elimination (L–R):

Gretchen (Rosa), Dudu Nobre (Bebê), Letícia Colin (Motoqueira), Beto Barbosa (Boto), Heloísa Périssé (Coxinha), Daiane dos Santos (Ursa), Amaral (Cachorro), Aline Wirley (Caranguejo), Thaeme Mariôto (Borboleta), Negra Li (Pavão), MC Guimê and Lexa (Lampião & Maria Bonita), Isabel Fillardis (Abacaxi), Lucy Alves (Leoa), Thiago Fragoso (Camaleão)

Not pictured: Juan Paiva (Robô), David Junior (Dragão)

== Future Appearances ==
After this season, in 2023, Aline Wirley (Caranguejo) and MC Guimê (Lampião, from Lampião & Maria Bonita) appeared in Big Brother Brasil 23. Aline was the runner-up of the season, while Guimê was expelled.

Still in 2023, Heloísa Périssé (Coxinha) and Daiane dos Santos (Ursa) appeared in Dança dos Famosos 20. Both remain in the competition.

== Episodes ==
=== Week 1 (January 23) ===
Performances on the first episode
| # | Stage name | Song | Identity | Result | |
|---|---|---|---|---|---|
| 1 | Abacaxi | "O Que É Que A Baiana Tem?" by Carmen Miranda | undisclosed | 41% | RISK |
| 2 | Lampião & Maria Bonita | "Na Base da Chinela" by Elba Ramalho/"Eu Só Quero Um Xodó" by Dominguinhos | undisclosed | 59% | WIN |
| 2 | Lampião & Maria Bonita | "Na Base da Chinela" by Elba Ramalho/"Eu Só Quero Um Xodó" by Dominguinhos | undisclosed | 59% | WIN |
| 3 | Borboleta | "Borboleta" by Marisa Monte | undisclosed | 61% | WIN |
| 4 | Motoqueira | "Born to Be Wild" by Steppenwolf | undisclosed | 39% | RISK |
| 5 | Ursa | "Doce Mel" by Xuxa | undisclosed | 70% | WIN |
| 6 | Rosa | "Amor I Love You" by Marisa Monte | Gretchen | 10% | OUT |
| 7 | Coxinha | "Girls Just Want to Have Fun" by Cyndi Lauper | undisclosed | 20% | RISK |

=== Week 2 (January 30) ===
Performances on the second episode
| # | Stage name | Song | Identity | Result | |
|---|---|---|---|---|---|
| 1 | Pavão | "Cheguei" by Ludmilla | undisclosed | 38% | RISK |
| 2 | Camaleão | "Blinding Lights" by The Weeknd | undisclosed | 62% | WIN |
| 3 | Caranguejo | "Combatchy" by Anitta, Lexa, and Luísa Sonza feat. MC Rebecca | undisclosed | 26% | RISK |
| 4 | Dragão | "Locked Out of Heaven" by Bruno Mars | undisclosed | 74% | WIN |
| 5 | Bebê | "Desce Pro Play" by Anitta, MC Zaac, and Tyga | Dudu Nobre | 16% | OUT |
| 6 | Boto | "Vamos Fugir" by Skank | undisclosed | 10% | RISK |
| 7 | Robô | "Admirável Chip Novo" by Pitty | undisclosed | 74% | WIN |

=== Week 3 (February 6) ===
Performances on the third episode
| # | Stage name | Song | Identity | Result | |
|---|---|---|---|---|---|
| 1 | Coxinha | "Garota Nacional" by Skank | undisclosed | 51% | WIN |
| 2 | Abacaxi | "Back to Black" by Amy Winehouse | undisclosed | 49% | RISK |
| 3 | Ursa | "Ursinho Pimpão" by Turma do Balão Mágico | undisclosed | 77% | WIN |
| 4 | Motoqueira | "A Queda" by Gloria Groove | Letícia Colin | 23% | OUT |
| 5 | Lampião & Maria Bonita | "Fico Assim Sem Você" by Claudinho & Buchecha | undisclosed | 57% | WIN |
| 5 | Lampião & Maria Bonita | "Fico Assim Sem Você" by Claudinho & Buchecha | undisclosed | 57% | WIN |
| 6 | Borboleta | "I'm Like a Bird" by Nelly Furtado | undisclosed | 43% | RISK |

=== Week 4 (February 13) ===
Performances on the fourth episode
| # | Stage name | Song | Identity | Result | |
|---|---|---|---|---|---|
| 1 | Camaleão | "Poker Face" by Lady Gaga | undisclosed | 84% | WIN |
| 2 | Caranguejo | "Ginga" by IZA | undisclosed | 16% | RISK |
| 3 | Robô | "Envolvidão" by Rael da Rima | undisclosed | 35% | RISK |
| 4 | Dragão | "Fulminante" by Mumuzinho | undisclosed | 65% | WIN |
| 5 | Pavão | "The Lady Is a Tramp" by Tony Bennett and Lady Gaga | undisclosed | 77% | WIN |
| 6 | Boto | "Menino do Rio" by Baby do Brasil | Beto Barbosa | 23% | OUT |

=== Week 5 (February 27) ===
Performances on the fifth episode
| # | Stage name | Song | Identity | Result | |
|---|---|---|---|---|---|
| 1 | Coxinha | "Ragatanga" by Rouge | Heloísa Périssé | 42% | OUT |
| 2 | Ursa | "Peguei um Ita no Norte" by Salgueiro | undisclosed | 58% | WIN |
| 3 | Lampião & Maria Bonita | "Beijar Na Boca" by Claudia Leitte | undisclosed | SAFE | |
| 4 | Abacaxi | "Mas que Nada" by Jorge Ben | undisclosed | 47% | WIN |
| 5 | Borboleta | "Swing da Cor" by Daniela Mercury feat. Olodum | undisclosed | 10% | RISK |
| 6 | Leoa | "Deixa Isso Pra Lá" by Jair Rodrigues | undisclosed | 43% | RISK |

=== Week 6 (March 6) ===
Performances on the sixth episode
| # | Stage name | Song | Identity | Result | |
|---|---|---|---|---|---|
| 1 | Camaleão | "Don't Let the Sun Go Down on Me" by Elton John | undisclosed | 65% | WIN |
| 2 | Robô | "Carolina" by Seu Jorge | Juan Paiva | 35% | OUT |
| 3 | Pavão | "Vou Festejar" by Beth Carvalho | undisclosed | SAFE | |
| 4 | Dragão | "É Proibido Fumar" by Roberto Carlos | undisclosed | 35% | RISK |
| 5 | Caranguejo | "Regime Fechado" by Simone & Simaria | undisclosed | 22% | RISK |
| 6 | Cachorro | "Coração Cachorro" by Ávine Vinny and Matheus Fernandes | undisclosed | 43% | WIN |

=== Week 7 (March 13) ===
Performances on the seventh episode
| # | Stage name | Song | Identity | Result | |
|---|---|---|---|---|---|
| 1 | Caranguejo | "O Amor e o Poder" by Rosana | undisclosed | 42% | WIN |
| 2 | Pavão | "Show das Poderosas" by Anitta | undisclosed | 17% | SAFE |
| 3 | Lampião & Maria Bonita | "Cruisin'" by Smokey Robinson | undisclosed | 41% | SAFE |
| 4 | Abacaxi | "Bom" by Ludmilla | undisclosed | 22% | SAFE |
| 5 | Cachorro | "Tá Escrito" by Xande de Pilares | undisclosed | 29% | SAFE |
| 6 | Leoa | "Levitating" by Dua Lipa | undisclosed | 49% | WIN |
| 7 | Dragão | "Meu Lugar" by Arlindo Cruz | undisclosed | 32% | SAFE |
| 8 | Borboleta | "Ironic" by Alanis Morissette | undisclosed | 58% | WIN |
| 9 | Camaleão | "Metamorfose Ambulante" by Raul Seixas | undisclosed | 10% | SAFE |
| 10 | Ursa | | Daiane dos Santos | WD | |

=== Week 8 (March 20) ===
- Episode 8 was a TV Globo soap opera special, all performances were based on songs from their soundtrack.

Performances on the eighth episode
| # | Stage name | Song | Novela | Identity | Result | |
|---|---|---|---|---|---|---|
| 1 | Leoa | "Tieta" by Luiz Caldas | Tieta | undisclosed | 54% | WIN |
| 2 | Pavão | "Pavão Mysteriozo" by Ednardo | Saramandaia | undisclosed | 46% | RISK |
| 3 | Cachorro | "Beija-me" by Ludmilla | Salve-se Quem Puder | Amaral | 12% | OUT |
| 4 | Camaleão | "Blaze of Glory" by Jon Bon Jovi | O Outro Lado do Paraíso | undisclosed | 88% | WIN |
| 5 | Borboleta | "Você Sempre Será" by Marjorie Estiano | Malhação (2004) | undisclosed | 28% | RISK |
| 6 | Lampião & Maria Bonita | "A Viagem" by Roupa Nova | A Viagem | undisclosed | 72% | WIN |
| 6 | Lampião & Maria Bonita | "A Viagem" by Roupa Nova | A Viagem | undisclosed | 72% | WIN |
| 7 | Caranguejo | "Brasil" by Gal Costa | Vale Tudo | undisclosed | SAFE | |
| 8 | Abacaxi | "María" by Ricky Martin | Salsa e Merengue | undisclosed | 42% | RISK |
| 9 | Dragão | "Vem Dançar Kuduro" by Lucenzo | Avenida Brasil | undisclosed | 58% | WIN |

=== Week 9 (March 27) ===
Performances on the ninth episode
| # | Stage name | Song | Identity | Result | |
|---|---|---|---|---|---|
| 1 | Leoa | "Dance Monkey" by Tones & I | undisclosed | 80% | WIN |
| 2 | Abacaxi | "Alô, Alô Marciano" by Elis Regina | undisclosed | 20% | RISK |
| 3 | Borboleta | "Era uma Vez" by Kell Smith | undisclosed | 70% | WIN |
| 4 | Caranguejo | "Batom de Cereja" by Israel & Rodolffo | Aline Wirley | 30% | OUT |
| 5 | Camaleão | "Billie Jean" by Michael Jackson | undisclosed | 72% | WIN |
| 6 | Pavão | "Problema Seu" by Pabllo Vittar | undisclosed | 28% | RISK |
| 7 | Dragão | "All of Me" by John Legend | undisclosed | 68% | WIN |
| 8 | Lampião & Maria Bonita | "Livin' on a Prayer" by Bon Jovi | undisclosed | 32% | RISK |
| 8 | Lampião & Maria Bonita | "Livin' on a Prayer" by Bon Jovi | undisclosed | 32% | RISK |

=== Week 10 (April 3) ===
Performances on the tenth episode
| # | Stage name | Song | Identity | Result | |
|---|---|---|---|---|---|
| 1 | Pavão | "Leilão" by Gloria Groove | undisclosed | 25% | RISK |
| 2 | Camaleão | "Thinking Out Loud" by Ed Sheeran | undisclosed | 75% | WIN |
| 3 | Abacaxi | "Foi Pá Pum" by Simone & Simaria | undisclosed | 39% | RISK |
| 4 | Lampião & Maria Bonita | "If I Ain't Got You" by Alicia Keys | undisclosed | 61% | WIN |
| 4 | Lampião & Maria Bonita | "If I Ain't Got You" by Alicia Keys | undisclosed | 61% | WIN |
| 5 | Dragão | "Pé Na Areia" by Diogo Nogueira | undisclosed | SAFE | |
| 6 | Borboleta | "Mamma Mia" by ABBA | Thaeme Mariôto | 20% | OUT |
| 7 | Leoa | "Bad Romance" by Lady Gaga | undisclosed | 80% | WIN |

=== Week 11 (April 10) ===
Performances on the eleventh episode
| # | Stage name | Song | Identity | Result | |
|---|---|---|---|---|---|
| 1 | Lampião & Maria Bonita | "Summer Nights" from Grease | undisclosed | 51% | WIN |
| 1 | Lampião & Maria Bonita | "Summer Nights" from Grease | undisclosed | 51% | WIN |
| 2 | Leoa | "We Don't Need Another Hero (Thunderdome)" from Mad Max Beyond Thunderdome | undisclosed | 49% | RISK |
| 3 | Dragão | "Ciclo Sem Fim" from The Lion King | undisclosed | 91% | WIN |
| 4 | Pavão | "Don't You Worry 'bout a Thing" from Sing | Negra Li | 9% | OUT |
| 5 | Camaleão | "El Tango de Roxanne" from Moulin Rouge! | undisclosed | 58% | WIN |
| 6 | Abacaxi | "Finally" from The Adventures of Priscilla, Queen of the Desert | undisclosed | 42% | RISK |

=== Week 12 (April 17) ===
Performances on the twelfth episode
| # | Stage name | Song | Identity | Result | |
|---|---|---|---|---|---|
| 1 | Dragão | "Exagerado" by Cazuza | undisclosed | 31% | SAFE |
| 2 | Lampião & Maria Bonita | "Because of You" by Kelly Clarkson | MC Guimê | 23% | OUT |
| 2 | Lampião & Maria Bonita | "Because of You" by Kelly Clarkson | Lexa | 23% | OUT |
| 3 | Leoa | "Beat It" by Michael Jackson | undisclosed | 7% | RISK |
| 4 | Abacaxi | "Fadas" by Luiz Melodia | undisclosed | 12% | RISK |
| 5 | Camaleão | "Beggin'" by Måneskin | undisclosed | 27% | SAFE |
Smackdown
| 1 | Abacaxi | "Havana" by Camila Cabello feat. Young Thug | Isabel Fillardis | OUT | |
| 2 | Leoa | "Deixo" by Ivete Sangalo | undisclosed | SAFE | |

=== Week 13 (April 24) - Finale ===
Performances on the thirteenth episode
| # | Stage name | Song | Identity | Result | |
|---|---|---|---|---|---|
| 1 | Camaleão | "Bohemian Rhapsody" by Queen | undisclosed | 37% | SAFE |
| 2 | Leoa | "Luar do Sertão"/"No Rancho Fundo" by Chitãozinho & Xororó | Lucy Alves | 20% | THIRD |
| 3 | Dragão | "Sangrando" by Emílio Santiago | undisclosed | 43% | SAFE |
Smackdown
| 1 | Camaleão | "I Don't Want to Miss a Thing" by Aerosmith | Thiago Fragoso | RUNNER-UP | |
| 2 | Dragão | "Amazing Grace" by Il Divo | David Junior | WINNER | |

== Ratings and reception ==
=== Brazilian ratings ===
All numbers are in points and provided by Kantar Ibope Media.

| Episode | Air date | Timeslot (BRT) | SP viewers (in points) | Source |
|---|---|---|---|---|
| 1 | January 23, 2022 | Sunday 3:45 p.m. | 14.1 | |
| 2 | January 30, 2022 | Sunday 3:45 p.m. | 14.9 | |
| 3 | February 6, 2022 | Sunday 3:45 p.m. | 13.5 | |
| 4 | February 13, 2022 | Sunday 3:45 p.m. | 13.2 | |
| 5 | February 27, 2022 | Sunday 3:45 p.m. | 10.7 | |
| 6 | March 6, 2022 | Sunday 3:45 p.m. | 11.7 | |
| 7 | March 13, 2022 | Sunday 3:45 p.m. | 12.5 | |
| 8 | March 20, 2022 | Sunday 3:45 p.m. | 13.5 | |
| 9 | March 27, 2022 | Sunday 3:45 p.m. | 10.8 | |
| 10 | April 3, 2022 | Sunday 3:45 p.m. | 9.5 | |
| 11 | April 10, 2022 | Sunday 3:45 p.m. | 11.3 | |
| 12 | April 17, 2022 | Sunday 3:45 p.m. | 11.9 | |
| 13 | April 24, 2022 | Sunday 3:45 p.m. | 15.7 | |
