= The Masked Singer Brasil =

Brazilian reality singing competition television show

- Genre: Reality competition
- Based on: King of Mask Singer by MBC Entertainment
- Directed by: Marcelo Amiky
- Presented by: Eliana; Kenya Sade
- Judges: Tony Ramos; Sabrina Sato; Tatá Werneck; Belo
- Opening theme: Each season has its own opening act
- Country of origin: Brazil
- Original language: Portuguese
- No. of seasons: 5
- No. of episodes: 58

Production
- Camera setup: Multiple-camera
- Running time: 90–105 minutes
- Production company: Endemol Shine Brasil

Original release
- Network: TV Globo
- Release: August 10, 2021 – March 30, 2025

The Masked Singer Brasil is a Brazilian reality singing competition television series based on the South Korean television series King of Mask Singer. The series premiered on August 10, 2021, and ended on March 30, 2025, on TV Globo.

The series features celebrities singing songs while wearing head-to-toe costumes and face masks concealing their identities. It employs panelists who guess the celebrities' identities by interpreting clues provided to them throughout the series.

== Production ==
=== Development ===
In early January 2020, it was reported that TV Globo and SBT were in the running for the rights to produce The Masked Singer format in Brazil. The series was confirmed in April 2021 by Endemol Shine Brasil and would be produced by TV Globo and premiering in August 2021.

== Hosts and panelists ==
=== Hosts ===
Singer Ivete Sangalo is the main host of the show in addition to serving as an executive producer. Camilla de Lucas served as backstage host and interviewer for season 1, with Priscilla Alcantara replacing her starting on season 2.

Key
Main host
Backstage

Timeline of hosts
Host	Seasons				
Host	1	2	3	4	5
Ivete Sangalo					
Eliana Michaelichen					
Camilla de Lucas					
Priscilla Alcantara					
Kenya Sade					

=== Panelists ===
The original panel consisted of comedian Eduardo Sterblitch, singer Simone Mendes, actor Rodrigo Lombardi and actress Taís Araújo. Comedian Tatá Werneck replaced Simone on season 2. TV host Sabrina Sato and actor Mateus Solano replaced Tatá and Rodrigo respectively on season 3.

Timeline of panelists
Panelist	Seasons				
Panelist	1	2	3	4	5
Eduardo Sterblitch					
Simone Mendes					
Rodrigo Lombardi					
Taís Araújo					
Tatá Werneck					
Sabrina Sato					
Mateus Solano					
José Loreto					
Paulo Vieira					
Belo					
Tony Ramos					

==== Line-up ====
Judges' line-up by chairs order
Season	Year	Judges			
Season	Year	1	2	3	4
1	2021	Rodrigo	Taís	Simone	Sterblitch
2	2022	Tatá	Rodrigo	Taís	Sterblitch
3	2023	Sabrina	Sterblitch	Taís	Mateus
4	2024	Loreto	Sabrina	Taís	Paulo
5	2025	Sabrina	Tony	Tatá	Belo

== Season synopsis ==
Series overview
Season	Contestants	Episodes	Originally released		Winner	Runner-up	Third place
Season	Contestants	Episodes	First released	Last released	Winner	Runner-up	Third place
1	12	9	August 10, 2021	October 19, 2021	Priscilla Alcantara as "Unicórnio"	Nicolas Prattes as "Monstro"	Cris Vianna as "Arara"
2	16	13	January 23, 2022	April 24, 2022	David Junior as "Dragão"	Thiago Fragoso as "Camaleão"	Lucy Alves as "Leoa"
3	14	12	January 22, 2023	April 9, 2023	Flay as "DJ Vitória-Régia"	Larissa Luz as "Abelha Rainha"	Xamã as "Galo"
4	12	12	January 21, 2024	April 7, 2024	Silvero Pereira as "Bode"	Ludmillah Anjos as "Preguiça"	Evelyn Castro as "Sereia Iara"
5	16	12	January 12, 2025	March 30, 2025	Diego Martins as "Odete Roitman"	Jonathan Azevedo as "Foguinho"	Jeniffer Nascimento as "Sol"

== Ratings and reception ==
=== Brazilian ratings ===
All numbers are in points and provided by Kantar Ibope Media.

Season	Timeslot (BRT)	First aired		Last aired		TV season	SP viewers (in points)	Source
Season	Timeslot (BRT)	Date	Viewers (in points)	Date	Viewers (in points)	TV season	SP viewers (in points)	Source
1	Tuesday 10:30 p.m.	August 10, 2021	21.2	October 19, 2021	20.7	2021	19.44	
2	Sunday 03:45 p.m.	January 23, 2022	14.1	April 24, 2022	15.7	2022	12.56	
3	Sunday 03:45 p.m.	January 22, 2023	9.3	April 9, 2023	10.9	2023	10.98	
4	Sunday 03:45 p.m.	January 21, 2024	13.2	April 7, 2024		2024		

- Each point represents a specific number of households in São Paulo.
  - 2021: 76.577 households.
  - 2022: 74.666 households.
  - 2023: 76.953 households.
