= Sabrina Sato =

Brazilian television presenter (born 1981)

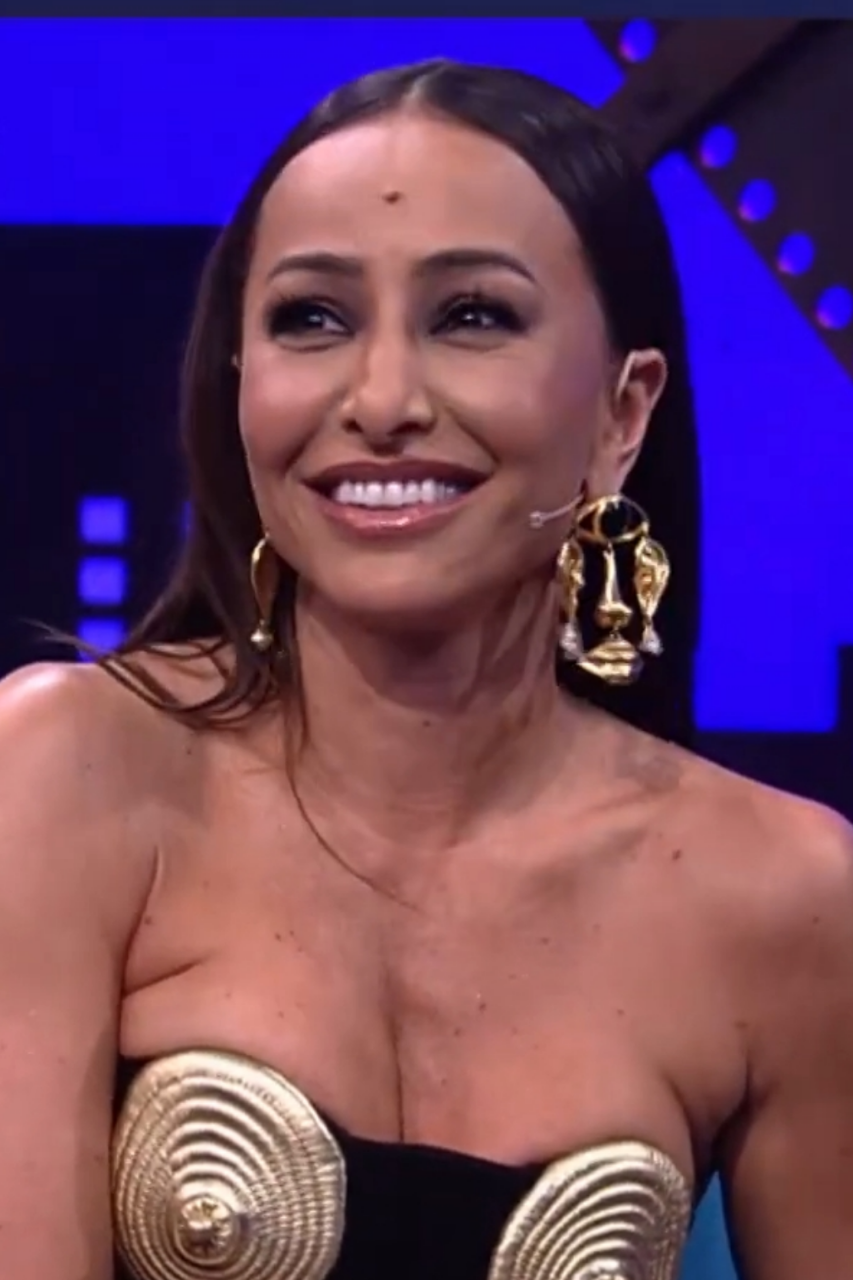
- Sato in 2022
- Born: Sabrina Sato Rahal; 4 February 1981 (age 45); Penápolis, São Paulo, Brazil
- Occupation: Television presenter
- Years active: 2000–present
- Spouse: Nicolas Prattes (m. 2025)
- Children: 1

Sabrina Sato Rahal (Portuguese: [saˈbɾinɐ ˈsatu]; born 4 February 1981) is a Brazilian television presenter. She was a contestant on Big Brother Brasil 3 (2003) and a hostess on the comedy program Pânico na TV from 2004 until 2013. From 2014 to 2019, she had her own show on RecordTV.

== Early life ==
Sabrina Sato Rahal was born and raised in Penápolis, a city in the interior of São Paulo. She is the daughter of Omar Rahal, a businessman, son of a Lebanese father and a Swiss mother, and Kika Sato Rahal, a psychologist, daughter of Japanese parents.

Sabrina has two more siblings, and is the middle child, the eldest being called Karina, and the youngest is called Karin. During her childhood, she already wanted to be an actress. At this time she took a course in theater and classical ballet in her hometown.

At the age of sixteen, she moved to São Paulo with her family, where, in addition to seeking a better life in the big city, her goal was to improve her studies in classical ballet and also study contemporary dance, in addition to perfecting her studies in cinema and theater, and get her actress registration.

With these goals achieved, at the age of eighteen she moved alone to Rio de Janeiro, where she passed the entrance exam to study dance at the Federal University of Rio de Janeiro. She currently lives in São Paulo.

== Career ==
=== 2000–2011: Domingão do Faustão, Big Brother Brasil and RedeTV! ===
In 2000, she became a dancer on the Domingão do Faustão program on TV Globo, where she remained until the following year. In 2001 she participated in the telenovela Porto dos Milagres. In 2003, the broadcaster selected Sato to participate in the reality show Big Brother Brasil 3. She was eliminated in the eighth week, receiving 60% of the public's votes after facing a wall with participant Dhomini Ferreira, who would become the winner of the edition.

After leaving the BBB, she attracted the attention of Playboy magazine, which featured Sato in the cover shoot in May 2003. In the following months, she made several appearances on the Jovem Pan Pânico program, until eventually being hired by the production in August 2003. Even with Globo's invitation to participate in Da Cor do Pecado, Sabrina decided to stay on Pânico, which at the time was preparing to also premiere a television version on RedeTV!. In Pânico na TV, Sabrina made appearances in minimal clothes, and found herself exposed in matters of a certain risk.

On 2 April 2006, Sabrina was removed from Pânico, both on TV and on the radio, due to her condition being the reason for the reclassification of the program's age group.

However, shortly after the incident, she continued to participate in the aforementioned program, through special articles. Being out of the program, Sabrina releases the song "É Verdade". In August of the same year, she returned to the regular cast of the program. After 8 years with his contract with RedeTV! working on the program Pânico na TV, the cast left the station and signed a contract with Rede Bandeirantes.

=== 2012–2021: Pânico na Band and RecordTV ===
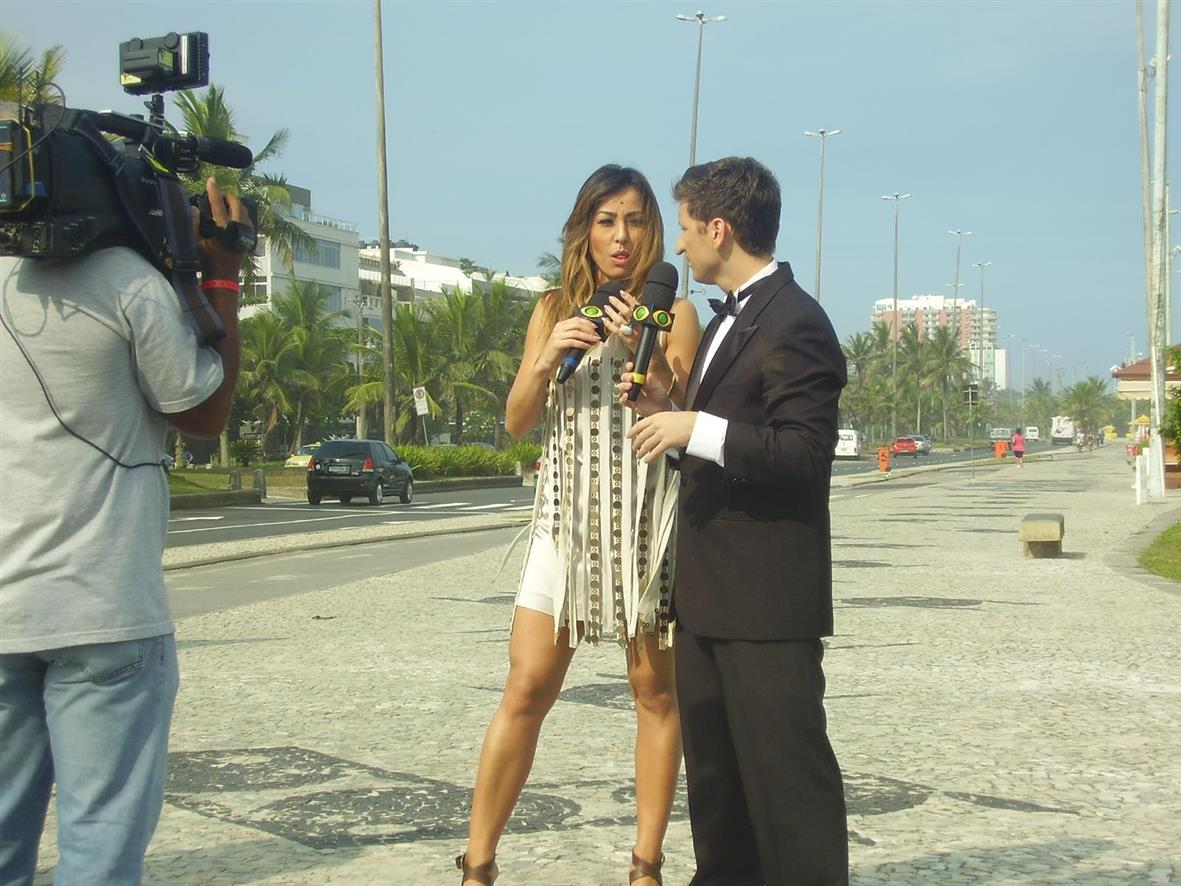
Sato alongside Daniel Zukerman in a recording for Pânico na Band in 2012.

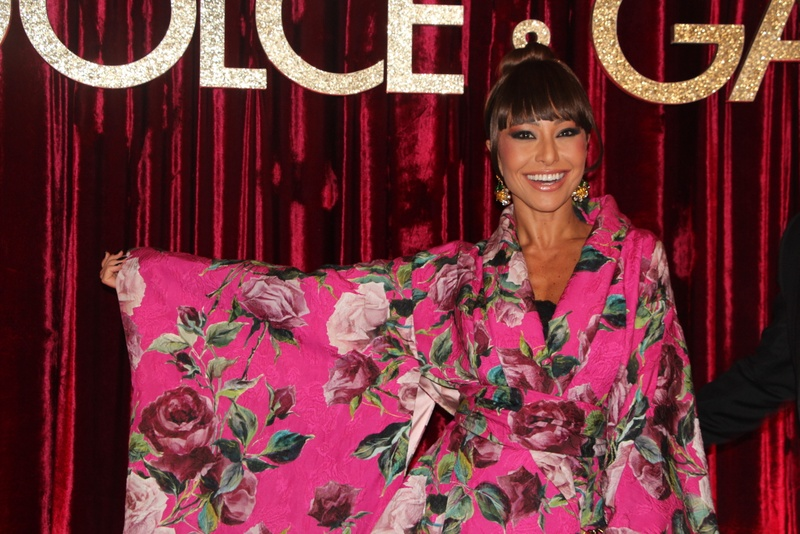
Sato at a Dolce & Gabbana event in 2016.

On 1 April 2012, Pânico na Band debuts. On 16 December 2013, Sabrina announced, through her Facebook page, and in a text written by herself, her departure from the Pânico program, after 10 years with the group, and after a week of his name being bombarded by the press due to speculation. and, later, confirmation by RecordTV that she was in advanced negotiation with the broadcaster to present a solo program. During that week, the management of Rede Bandeirantes tried to reverse its departure, since it was the most commercially profitable member, responsible for 45% of the attraction's merchandising actions.

On 16 December 2013, Sabrina signs a contract with RecordTV and publishes a notification about her change of station: "Today, ten years later, I feel that it is time for my daughter to leave home. I have artistic concerns that I need to pursue. Something screams loudly inside me saying this is my way, crooked or straight, my way, what I believe". On 26 April 2014, she debuted as presenter of Programa da Sabrina, presented on Saturdays in prime time on the station, the program lasted until 30 March 2019.

On 8 March 2020, he started hosting the reality show Made In Japan presenting the program until its end in June 2020. In the meantime, Sato played the character Divina in the Netflix reality television series Reality Z. In October of the same year, Sato presented the reality show Game dos Clones, on Prime Video. In 2021, Sabrina Sato was confirmed as the presenter of the reality show Ilha Record, which had its debut in July 2021, remaining for one season.

=== 2022–present: Departure from RecordTV and Globo Group ===
In March 2022, through her Instagram account, Sabrina Sato officially said goodbye to RecordTV, where she stayed for 8 years at the station. With the end of the contract, Sato signed with Globo Group and started to present the talk show Saia Justa, from GNT, where he stayed for one season. In November of the same year, Sato was confirmed as a judge for The Masked Singer Brasil, on TV Globo, replacing the comedian and presenter Tatá Werneck.

== Carnival ==
Sabrina debuted at Carnival in 2004 as the muse of the samba school Gaviões da Fiel, from São Paulo.

In 2010, she was elevated to the position of godmother of the school's drums

In 2018, she became queen of drums. In Rio de Janeiro, Sabrina was the muse of Acadêmicos do Salgueiro between 2005 and 2010.

Between 2011 and 2019 she was drum queen of Unidos de Vila Isabel, in 2020 she paraded as queen of the school.

On 7 August 2021, her return to the position of queen of the battery Swingueira de Noel was announced.

== Personal life ==
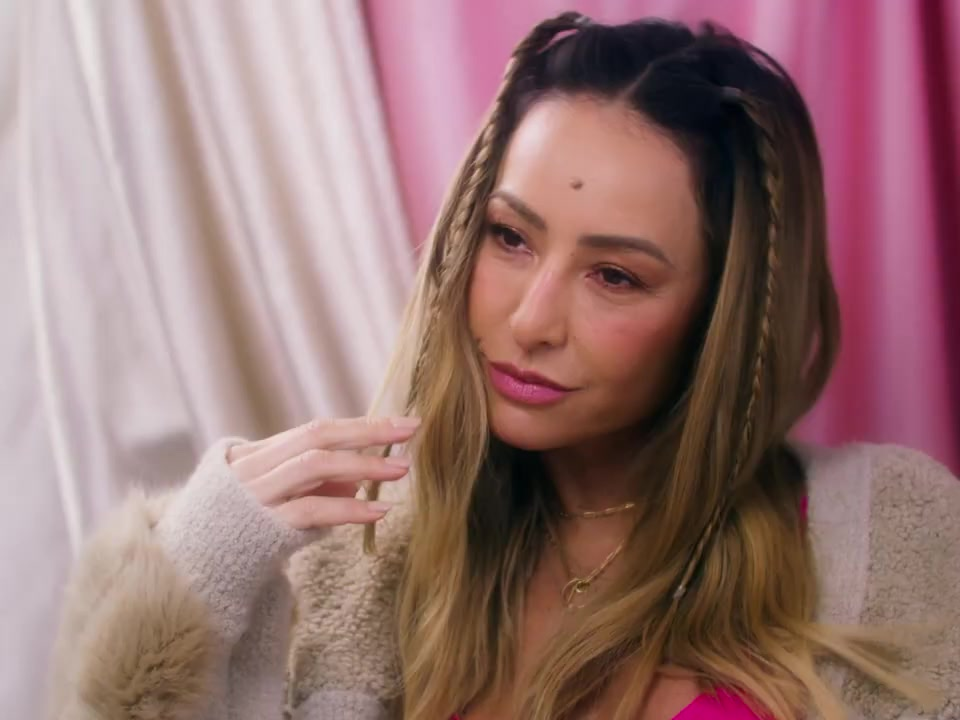
Sato in 2021.

Sabrina deals with attention deficit hyperactivity disorder (ADHD) and talks about the topic openly.

In 2003, while participating in Big Brother Brasil, Sabrina got involved with Dhomini, winner of the edition, with whom she had a brief relationship outside the house. In the same year, Sabrina started a relationship with comedian Carlos Alberto da Silva, her colleague on Pânico na TV, whose relationship lasted until 2005. From 2007 to 2008, she dated film director Ernani Nunes. The following year, the presenter began dating federal deputy Fábio Faria, with whom she had a relationship until 2012. From 2013 to 2015, Sabrina Sato dated actor and publicist João Vicente de Castro.

In March 2016, she met actor Duda Nagle, son of journalist Leda Nagle. They started dating and moved in together in the same year, after a few months together. In January 2018, they announced their engagement. On 30 April, they announced that they were expecting their first child, a daughter. On 29 November 2018, their daughter was born by caesarean section in São Paulo.

On 21 March 2023, Sabrina went public with the end of the relationship with Duda Nagle after 7 years of marriage, with a request for shared custody of Zoe.

Since February 2024, she has been dating actor and singer Nicolas Prattes, known for his starring roles in several Rede Globo's soap operas. According to her, their relationship began during a trip to Costa Rica.

== Filmography ==
=== Film ===
Year	Title	Role	Notes
2002	Lilo & Stitch	Nani Pelekai	Brazilian Dub
2004	Back to Gaya	Princess Alanta	Brazilian Dub
2004	A Cartomante	Cliente	
2006	Asterix and the Vikings	Abba	Brazilian dub
2013	O Concurso	Martinha Pinéu	
2014	A Grande Vitória	Alice	
2014	Khumba	Mama V	Brazilian dub
2017	Divórcio	Herself	
2017	Oitavo	Mari	Short film

=== Television ===
Year	Title	Role	Notes
1989	Cortina de Vidro	Meg	
2000–02	Domingão do Faustão	Ballerina	
2001	Porto dos Milagres	Tchutchuca	
2003	Big Brother Brasil	Participant	Season 3
2003–2012	Pânico na TV	Reporter	
2012–2014	Pânico na Band	Reporter	
2014–2019	Programa da Sabrina	Host	
2015	Família Record	Host	Year-end special
2017	Família Record	Host	Year-end special
2018	Samantha!	Samonstra	Episode: "2"
2019–2020	Família Record	Host	Year-end special
2020	Domingo Show com Sabrina Sato	Host	
2020	Made In Japão	Host	
2020	Game dos Clones	Host	
2020	Reality Z	Divina McCall	Episode: "1"
2021	Ilha Record	Host	
2021	Gincana da Grana	Host	
2021	Especial Leonardo & Raça Negra	Host	Year-end special
2022–present	Carnaval da Sabrina	Host	
2022–2023	Saia Justa	Host	
2022–2023	Desapegue se for Capaz	Host	
2022	Ceia Sato	Host	Year-end special
2023–present	Essa eu Quero Ver	Host	
2023–2024	Sobre Nós Dois	Host	
2023	Papo de Segunda Verão	Host	
2023–present	The Masked Singer Brasil	Host	Judge
2025	BBB: O Documentário	Herself	
