= Beto Barbosa =

Brazilian Lambada singer and composer

Raimundo Roberto Morhy Barbosa (born 27 February 1955 in Belém, Pará ) is a Brazilian Lambada singer and composer.

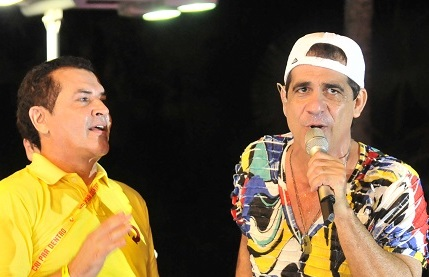
Beto Barbosa

== Life ==
Beto Barbosa comes from a Lebanese family and began a musical career in his hometown Belém. His first big successes took place after his move to Fortaleza, Ceará, where he also participated in political campaigns.

In the 1980s Beto Barbosa became famous with his piece "Adocica" and thus founded together with the band Kaoma the Lambada boom. During his career he won numerous awards and accolades, including, as the only singer from northern Brazil, the coveted Troféu Imprensa as the best singer. To date he has recorded 22 albums and sold 6 million records. His musical idols were the Brazilian singer Roberto Carlos and Elvis Presley. Privately, he had to endure several blows: His 28-year-old daughter died in 2010 from an unknown bacterial infection and years later he was diagnosed with cancer.

In 2022, he performed cosplayed as a boto in the reality singing competition The Masked Singer Brasil.

== Covers ==
"Embalo Trilegal" was covered by the Dominican band Los Hermanos Rosario as "Esa Morena".

"Mar de Emoções" was covered by the Colombian band Afrosound in their album Mar de Emociones.

== Discography ==
- Atos e Fatos (1985)
- Símbolo Perfeito (1987)
- Adocica (1988)
- Preta (1990)
- Dona (1991)
- Cigana do Amor (1992)
- Neguinha (1993)
- Ritmos (1994)
- Navegar (1995)
- Dança do Mel (1996)
- Beijo Selvagem (1997)
- Girando no Salão (1998)
- Ao Vivo – Dance e Balance (1999)
- Dance e Balance com o Beto Barbosa (2000)
- Forroneirando (2000)
- Claridade (2001)
- Grandes Sucessos e Inéditas (2002)
- Balada: Uma Explosão de Alegria (2003)
- Overdose de Amor (2005)
- Só as Melhores (2008)
