= The Masked Singer Brasil season 1 =

Season of Brazilian television series

The Masked Singer Brasil
- Season 1
- Starring: Eduardo Sterblitch; Simone Mendes; Rodrigo Lombardi; Taís Araújo
- Hosted by: Ivete Sangalo; Camila de Lucas
- No. of contestants: 12
- Winner: Priscilla Alcantara as "Unicórnio"
- Runner-up: Nicolas Prattes as "Monstro"
- No. of episodes: 10

Release
- Original network: TV Globo
- Original release: August 10 – October 19, 2021

Season chronology
- Next → Season 2

The first season of The Masked Singer Brasil premiered on August 10, 2021, on TV Globo. On October 19, 2021, during the season finale episode, singer Priscilla Alcantara as "Unicórnio" won the competition and took home the grand prize of R$100.000. Actor Nicolas Prattes as "Monstro" finished as runner-up, while actress Cris Vianna as "Arara" and actress Jéssica Ellen as "Gata Espelhada" came in third and fourth place, respectively.

In October 2021, TV Globo renewed the show for a second season which premiered in January 2022.

== Production ==
Filming for the season occurred from July 23 to August 19, 2021, at WTC Events Center in São Paulo.

== Hosts and panelists ==
Singer Ivete Sangalo serves as host, while Camila de Lucas serves as a backstage interviewer. The panelists consists of actor Rodrigo Lombardi, actress Taís Araújo, singer Simone Mendes and comedian Eduardo Sterblitch.

=== Guest panelists ===
Episode	Name	Occupation
3	Mariana Ximenes	Actress
4	Gil do Vigor	Former Big Brother Brasil 21 housemate
5	Paula Fernandes	Singer
6	Fernanda Gentil	TV Host
7	Ana Maria Braga	TV host

== Contestants ==
Results
Stage name	Celebrity	Occupation	Episodes									
Stage name	Celebrity	Occupation	1	2	3	4	5	6	7	8	10	
Stage name	Celebrity	Occupation	1	2	3	4	5	6	7	8	A	B
Unicórnio (Unicorn)	Priscilla Alcantara	Singer/presenter	WIN		SAFE		WIN	WIN	WIN	RISK	WIN	WINNER
Monstro (Monster)	Nicolas Prattes	Actor		RISK		WIN	WIN	SAFE	WIN	SAFE	WIN	RUNNER-UP
Arara (Macaw)	Cris Vianna	Actress/model	RISK		WIN		WIN	RISK	RISK	SAFE	OUT	
Gata Espelhada (Mirrored Cat)	Jéssica Ellen	Actress/Singer		RISK		RISK	RISK	WIN	WIN	RISK	OUT	
Jacaré (Alligator)	Mart'nália	Singer/actress		WIN		SAFE	RISK	WIN	RISK	OUT		
Astronauta (Astronaut)	Sérgio Loroza	Actor/singer	RISK		RISK		WIN	RISK	OUT			
Girassol (Sunflower)	Sandra de Sá	Singer	WIN		WIN		RISK	OUT				
Onça Pintada (Spotted Jaguar)	Alexandre Borges	Actor		WIN		WIN	OUT					
Boi-Bumbá	Marrone	Singer		WIN		OUT						
Coqueiro (Coconut Tree)	Marcelinho Carioca	Former footballer	WIN		OUT							
Brigadeiro	Renata Ceribelli	Journalist		OUT								
Dogão (Hot Dog)	Sidney Magal	Singer	OUT									

The masked singer won their face-off.
The masked singer lost their face-off.
The masked singer was safe from elimination.
The masked singer was eliminated from the competition and unmasked upon their elimination.
The masked singer did not perform.
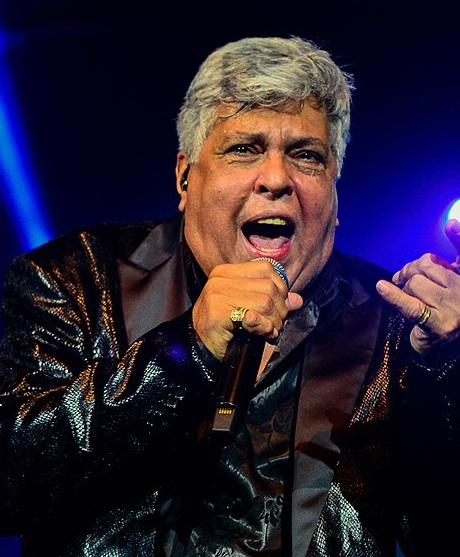
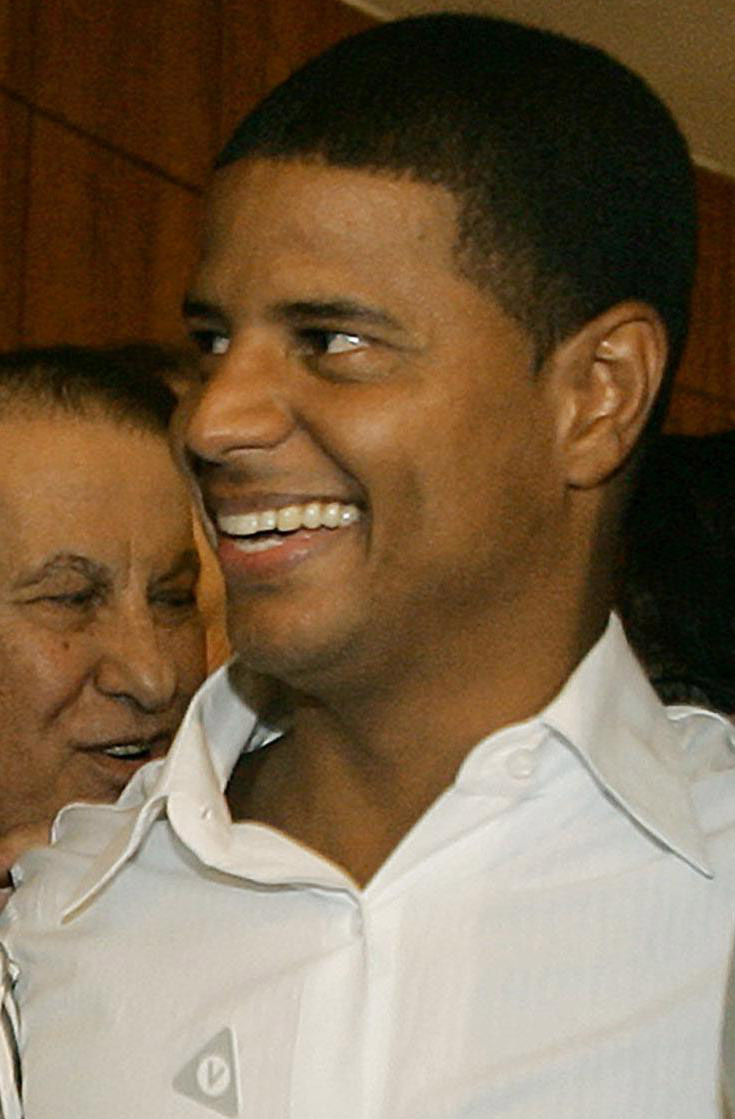
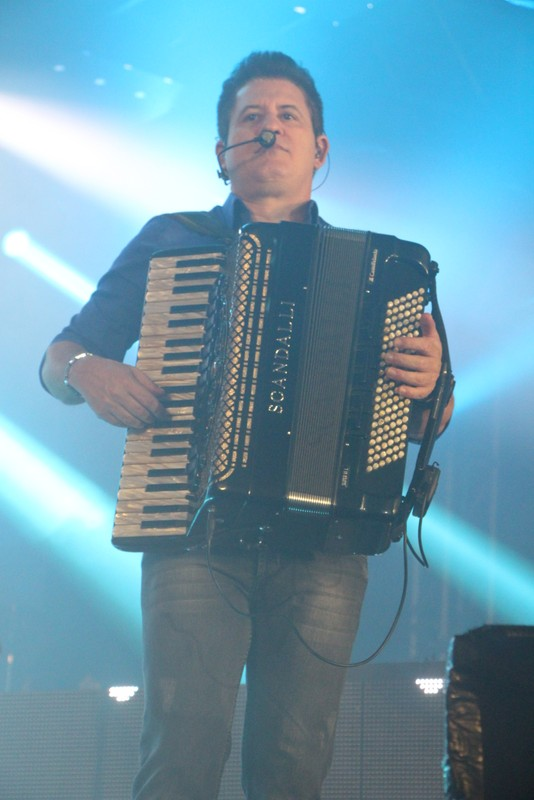
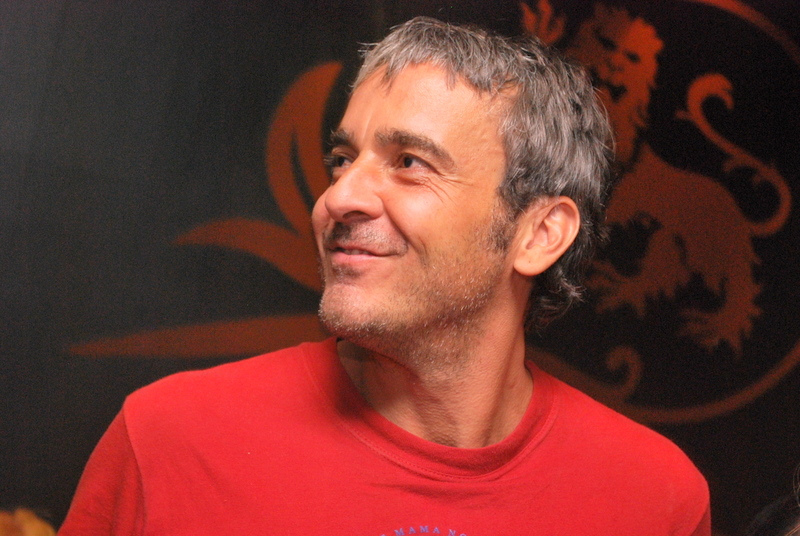
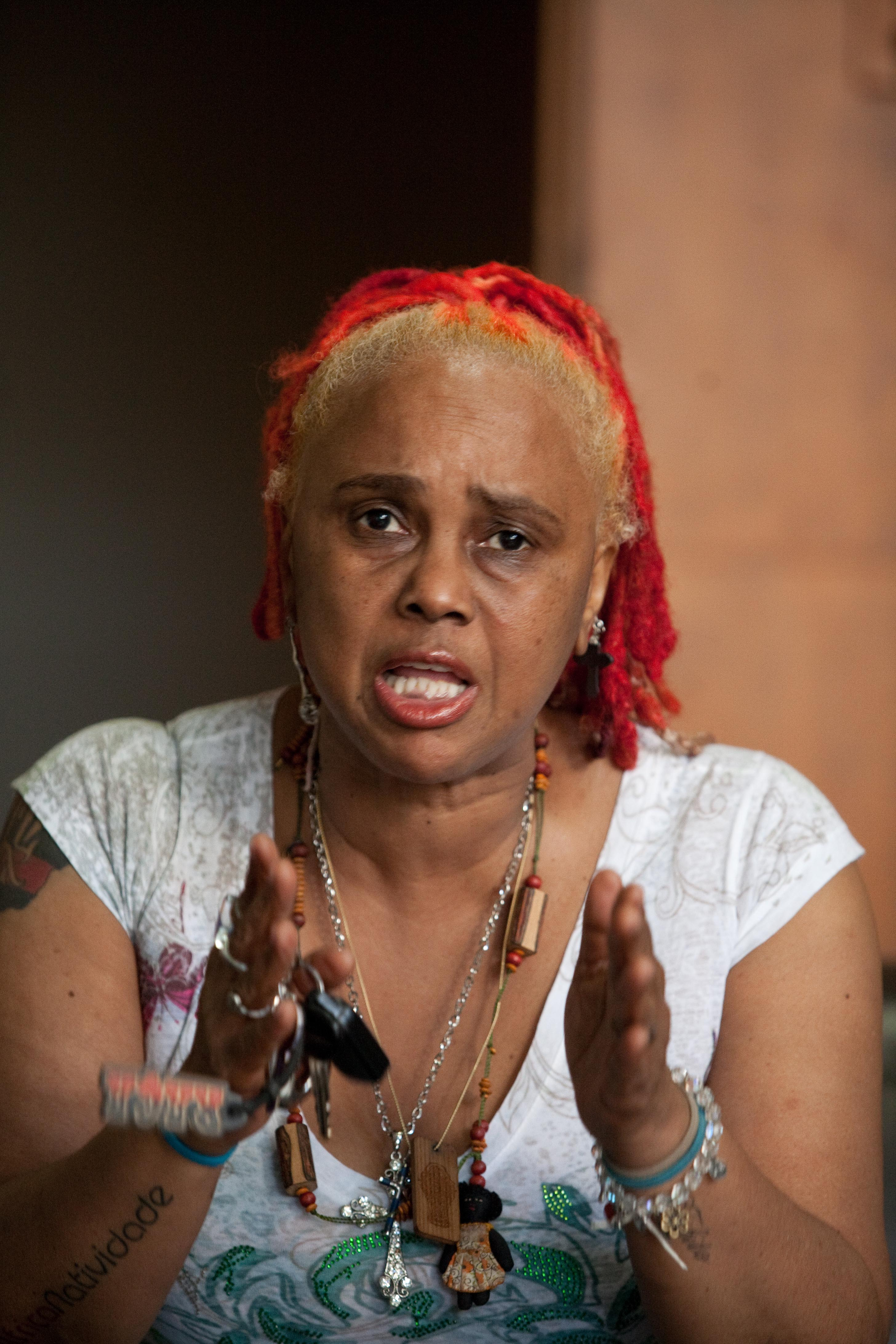
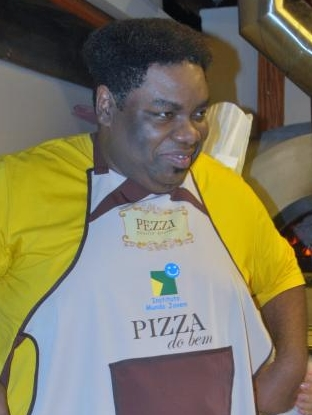
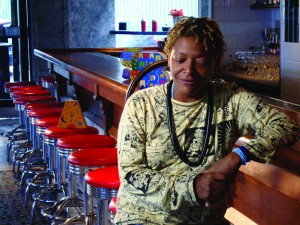
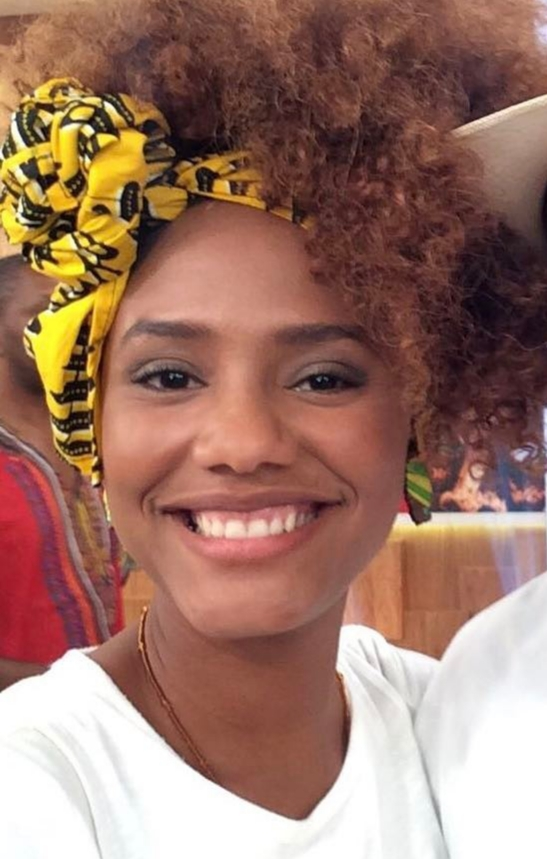
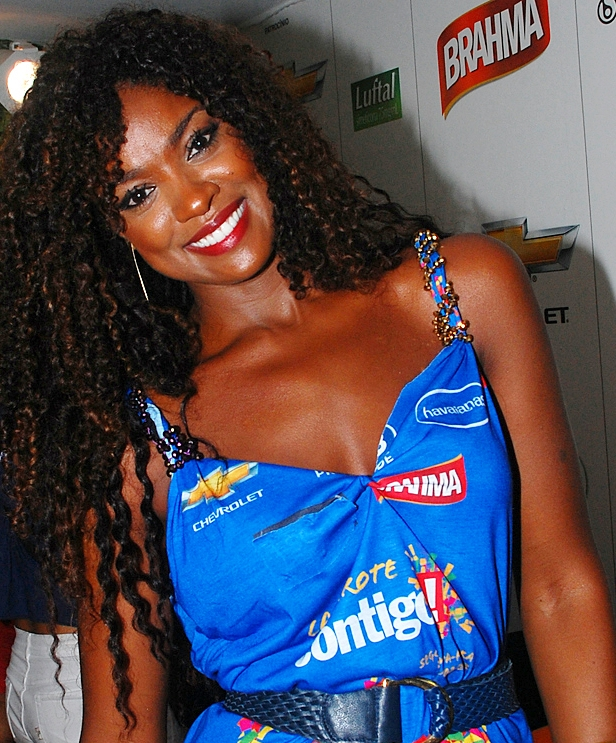
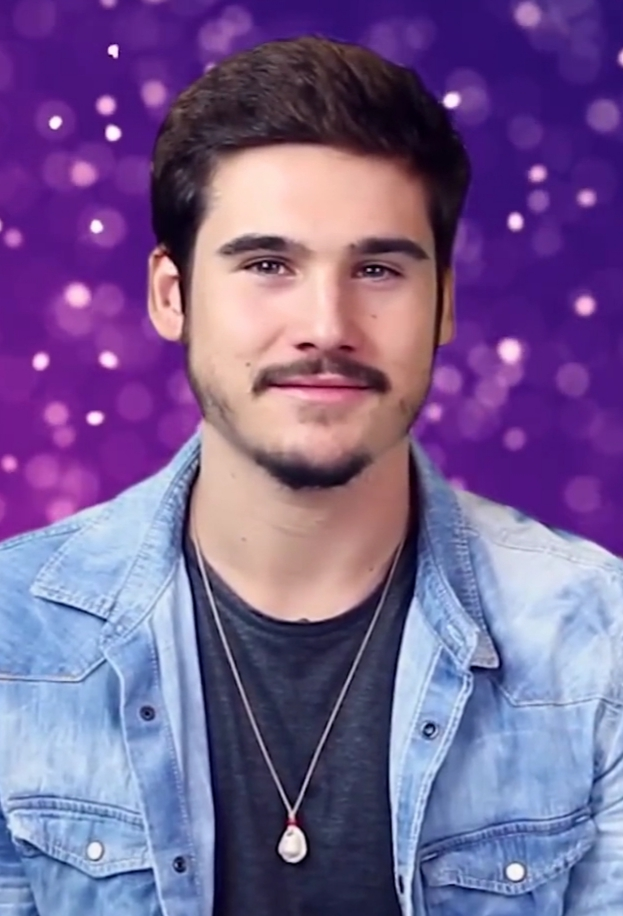
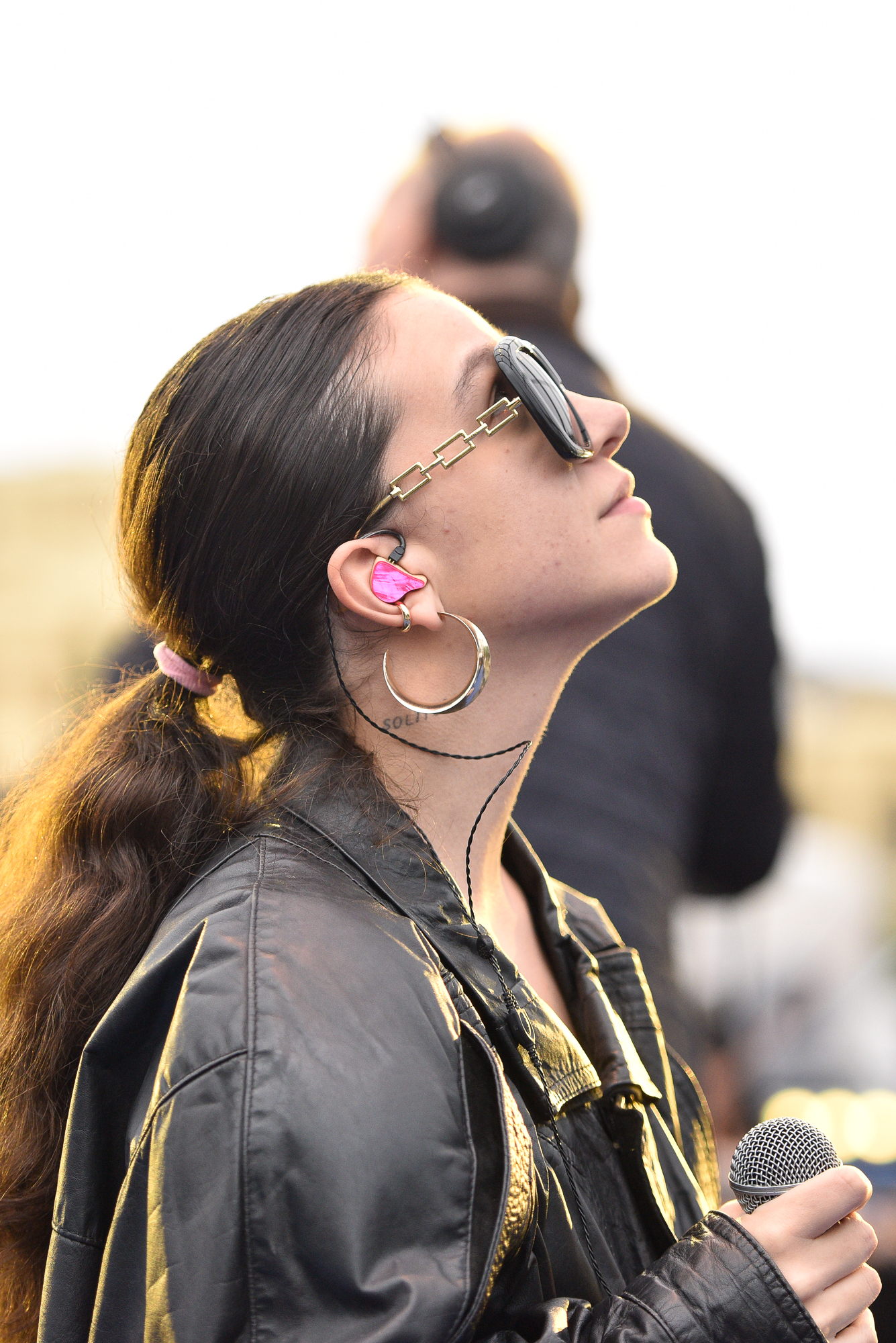
The celebrities who competed in the first season of The Masked Singer Brasil, pictured in order of elimination (L–R):

Sidney Magal ("Dogão"), Marcelinho Carioca ("Coqueiro"), Marrone ("Boi-Bumbá"), Alexandre Borges ("Onça Pintada"), Sandra de Sá ("Girassol"), Sérgio Loroza ("Astronauta"), Mart'nália ("Jacaré"), Jessica Ellen ("Gata Espelhada"), Cris Vianna ("Arara"), Nicolas Prattes ("Monstro"), Priscilla Alcântara ("Unicórnio")

Not pictured: Renata Ceribelli ("Brigadeiro")

== Episodes ==
=== Week 1 (August 10) ===
Performances on the first episode
#	Stage name	Song	Identity	Result	
1	Unicórnio	"Shallow" by Lady Gaga and Bradley Cooper	undisclosed	61%	WIN
2	Arara	"K.O." by Pabllo Vittar	undisclosed	39%	RISK
3	Astronauta	"Get Lucky" by Daft Punk	undisclosed	41%	RISK
4	Coqueiro	"Atrasadinha" by Felipe Araújo and Ferrugem	undisclosed	59%	WIN
5	Dogão	"Sai da Minha Aba" by Só Pra Contrariar	Sidney Magal	36%	OUT
6	Girassol	"Here Comes the Sun" by The Beatles	undisclosed	64%	WIN

=== Week 2 (August 17) ===
Performances on the second episode
#	Stage name	Song	Identity	Result	
1	Jacaré	"Bebi Liguei" by Marília Mendonça	undisclosed	83%	WIN
2	Brigadeiro	"Chocolate" by Tim Maia	Renata Ceribelli	17%	OUT
3	Gata Espelhada	"Can't Take My Eyes Off You" by Lauryn Hill	undisclosed	43%	RISK
4	Boi-Bumbá	"Admirável Gado Novo" by Zé Ramalho	undisclosed	57%	WIN
5	Onça Pintada	"Anunciação" by Alceu Valença	undisclosed	62%	WIN
6	Monstro	"Can't Stop the Feeling" by Justin Timberlake	undisclosed	38%	RISK

=== Week 3 (August 24) ===
Performances on the third episode
#	Stage name	Song	Identity	Result	
1	Unicórnio	"Lua de Cristal" by Xuxa	undisclosed	SAFE	
2	Girassol	"Haja Amor" by Luiz Caldas	undisclosed	74%	WIN
3	Coqueiro	"Me Apaixonei Pela Pessoa Errada" by Exaltasamba	undisclosed	26%	RISK
4	Arara	"Beleza Rara" by Banda Eva	undisclosed	62%	WIN
5	Astronauta	"Rocket Man" by Elton John	undisclosed	38%	RISK
Smackdown
1	Coqueiro	"Alma Gêmea" by Fábio Jr.	Marcelinho Carioca	OUT	
2	Astronauta	"A Lua e Eu" by Cassiano	undisclosed	SAFE	

=== Week 4 (August 31) ===
Performances on the fourth episode
#	Stage name	Song	Identity	Result	
1	Jacaré	"Bandido Corazón" by Ney Matogrosso	undisclosed	SAFE	
2	Monstro	"As Quatro Estações" by Sandy & Júnior	undisclosed	62%	WIN
3	Boi-Bumbá	"Evidências" by Chitãozinho & Xororó	undisclosed	38%	RISK
4	Onça Pintada	"Garçom" by Reginaldo Rossi	undisclosed	60%	WIN
5	Gata Espelhada	"Bang" by Anitta	undisclosed	40%	RISK
Smackdown
1	Boi-Bumbá	"Borbulhas de Amor" by Fagner	Marrone	OUT	
2	Gata Espelhada	"Fallin'" by Alicia Keys	undisclosed	SAFE	

=== Week 5 (September 14) ===
Performances on the fifth episode
#	Stage name	Song	Identity	Result	
1	Gata Espelhada	"Eu Não Vou" by Fat Family	undisclosed	12%	RISK
2	Arara	"Loka" by Simone & Simaria feat. Anitta	undisclosed	88%	WIN
3	Astronauta	"Coisinha do Pai" by Beth Carvalho	undisclosed	62%	WIN
4	Onça Pintada	"O Vira" by Secos & Molhados	undisclosed	38%	RISK
5	Girassol	"Bloco na Rua" by Sérgio Sampaio	undisclosed	34%	RISK
6	Monstro	"I Believe I Can Fly" by R. Kelly	undisclosed	66%	WIN
7	Jacaré	"Fera Ferida" by Maria Bethânia	undisclosed	10%	RISK
8	Unicórnio	"Single Ladies (Put a Ring on It)" by Beyoncé	undisclosed	90%	WIN
Smackdown
1	Onça Pintada	"La Bamba" by Ritchie Valens	Alexandre Borges	OUT	
2	Girassol	"Last Dance" by Donna Summer	undisclosed	SAFE	

=== Week 6 (September 21) ===
Monstro's non-competitive performance did not air on television during the show's original broadcast, but was later released online exclusively on Globoplay and YouTube.

Performances on the sixth episode
#	Stage name	Song	Identity	Result	
1	Monstro	"Somebody to Love" by Queen	undisclosed	SAFE	
2	Jacaré	"Vou Desafiar Você" by MC Sapão	undisclosed	51%	WIN
3	Arara	"Medo Bobo" by Maiara & Maraisa	undisclosed	49%	RISK
4	Unicórnio	"A Tua Voz" by Gloria Groove	undisclosed	59%	WIN
5	Girassol	"Glamurosa" by MC Marcinho	undisclosed	41%	RISK
6	Astronauta	"Certas Coisas" by Lulu Santos	undisclosed	38%	RISK
7	Gata Espelhada	"Irreplaceable" by Beyoncé	undisclosed	62%	WIN
Smackdown
1	Girassol	"As Rosas Não Falam" by Cartola	Sandra de Sá	OUT	
2	Arara	"É" by Gonzaguinha	undisclosed	SAFE	

=== Week 7 (September 28) ===
Performances on the seventh episode
#	Stage name	Song	Identity	Result	
1	Gata Espelhada	"Stay" by Rihanna ft. Mikky Ekko	undisclosed	64%	WIN
2	Jacaré	"Rock with You" by Michael Jackson	undisclosed	36%	RISK
3	Unicórnio	"Over the Rainbow" by Judy Garland	undisclosed	62%	WIN
4	Astronauta	"Gueto" by IZA	undisclosed	38%	RISK
5	Arara	"Pagu" by Rita Lee	undisclosed	49%	RISK
6	Monstro	"Leave the Door Open" by Silk Sonic	undisclosed	51%	WIN
Smackdown
1	Astronauta	"Além do Horizonte" by Jota Quest	Sérgio Loroza	OUT	
2	Jacaré	"Essa Mina é Louca" by Anitta	undisclosed	SAFE	

=== Week 8 (October 5) – Semifinals ===
Performances on the eighth episode
#	Stage name	Song	Identity	Result	
1	Jacaré	"Brisa" by IZA	undisclosed	12%	RISK
2	Unicórnio	"Girl from Rio" by Anitta	undisclosed	19%	RISK
3	Arara	"O Show Tem Que Continuar" by Fundo de Quintal	undisclosed	25%	SAFE
4	Monstro	"Tempo Perdido" by Legião Urbana	undisclosed	28%	SAFE
5	Gata Espelhada	"Rolling in the Deep" by Adele	undisclosed	16%	RISK
Smackdown
1	Jacaré	"Que Se Chama Amor" by Só Pra Contrariar	Mart'nália	OUT	
2	Unicórnio	"Sweet Child o' Mine" by Guns N' Roses	undisclosed	SAFE	

=== Week 10 (October 19) – Finals ===
Performances on the final episode
#	Stage name	Song	Identity	Result	
1	Unicórnio	"Quando a Chuva Passar" by Ivete Sangalo	undisclosed	69%	WIN
2	Gata Espelhada	"Greatest Love of All" by Whitney Houston	Jéssica Ellen	31%	OUT
3	Arara	"Got to Be Real" by Cheryl Lynn	Cris Vianna	44%	OUT
4	Monstro	"Você" by Tim Maia	undisclosed	56%	WIN
Smackdown
1	Unicórnio	"I Will Always Love You" by Whitney Houston	Priscilla Alcantara	WINNER	
2	Monstro	"Uptown Funk" by Mark Ronson feat. Bruno Mars	Nicolas Prattes	RUNNER-UP	

== Ratings and reception ==
=== Brazilian ratings ===
All numbers are in points and provided by Kantar Ibope Media.

Episode	Air date	Timeslot (BRT)	SP viewers (in points)	Source
1	August 10, 2021	Tuesday 10:30 p.m.	21.2	
2	August 17, 2021	Tuesday 10:30 p.m.	20.4	
3	August 24, 2021	Tuesday 10:30 p.m.	22.0	
4	August 31, 2021	Tuesday 10:30 p.m.	20.3	
5	September 14, 2021	Tuesday 10:30 p.m.	17.8	
6	September 21, 2021	Tuesday 10:30 p.m.	18.5	
7	September 28, 2021	Tuesday 10:30 p.m.	16.1	
8	October 5, 2021	Tuesday 10:30 p.m.	18.0	
9	October 17, 2021	Sunday 01:00 p.m.	10.7	
10	October 19, 2021	Tuesday 10:30 p.m.	20.7	

Note: Episode 9 was a special recap episode.

- In 2021, each point represents 268.278 households in 15 market cities in Brazil (76.577 households in São Paulo).
