= Cris Vianna =

Brazilian actress and singer

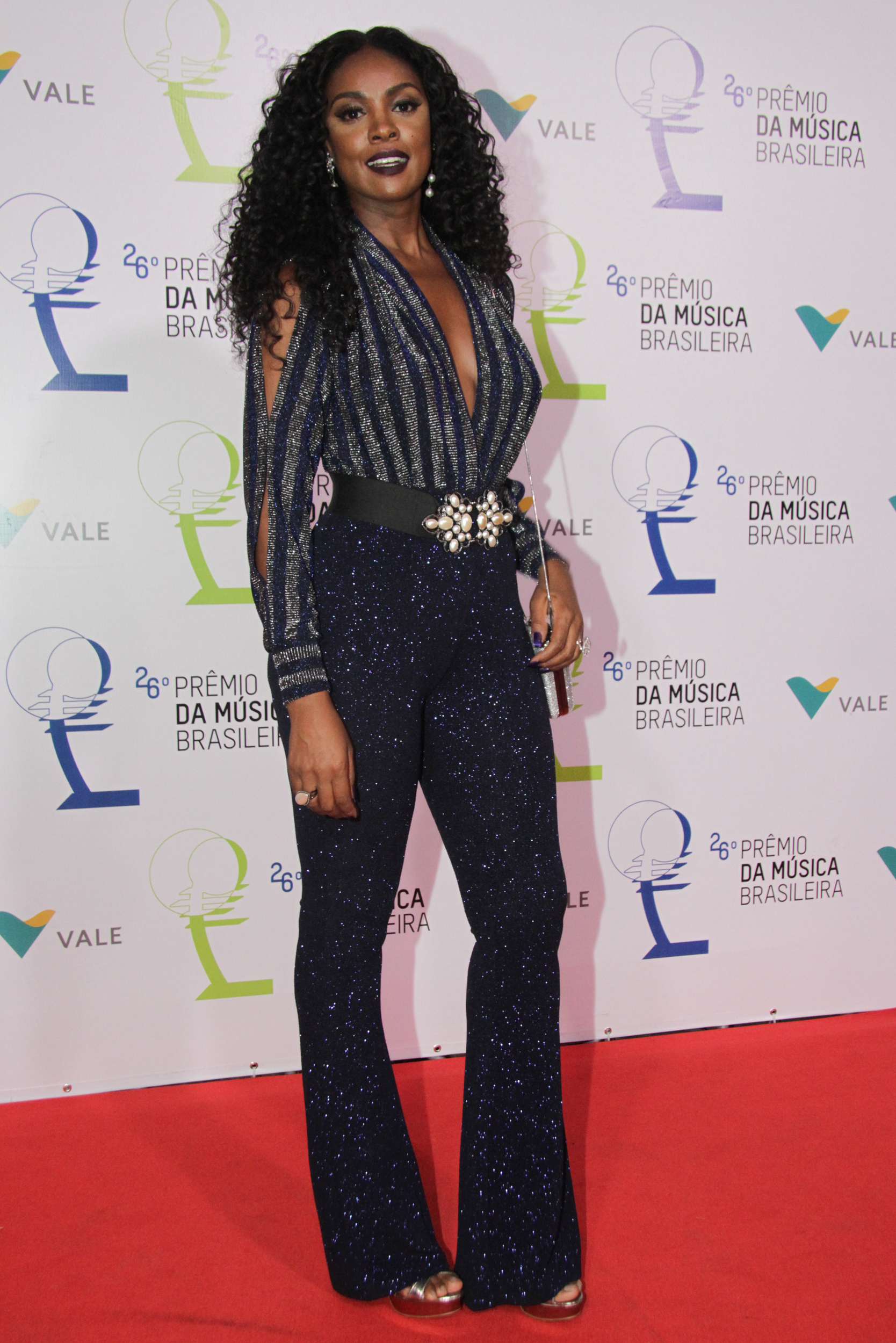
- Vianna in 2015
- Born: Kelly Cristina dos Santos; April 11, 1977 (age 49); São Paulo, Brazil
- Occupations: Actress, model
- Years active: 2005–present
- Height: 1.76 m (5 ft 9 in)

Kelly Cristina dos Santos, better known as Cris Vianna (born April 11, 1977) is a Brazilian actress, model, and former singer.

== Biography ==
Vianna was born in São Paulo. At the age of 13, her father, a sportsman, died. She was forced to pay for her studies the following year, as her mother, a nursing assistant, had to take care of the house and two other children. Vianna began taking care of two children, aged 5 and 7 years old, who were the daughters of a neighbor. She began her modelling career as a teenager, after knocking on the door of several agencies until she managed to schedule fashion shows and TV commercials. Vianna walked the runways in Italy, Canada, Australia and Germany.

Vianna made her television debut on América in 2005, portraying Drica. The following year, she had a role in Sinhá Moça as well as in O Profeta. Vianna sang for three years in the vocal group Black Voices.

In 2010, Vianna received the Raça Negra trophy, in the Best Cinema Actress category, for her role in The Assailant. She was the drum queen of Grande Rio at the Carnival in 2011. Vianna joined the cast of the soap opera Fina Estampa in 2011, playing Dagmar dos Anjos. She said that she identified with her character's sensual side. In 2014, Vianna played Juju Popular on the soap opera Império. The role was originally intended for Viviane Araújo.

On December 1, 2015, Vianna was a victim of racism on social media, alongside the journalist Maria Júlia Coutinho and the actress Taís Araújo.

== Filmography ==
=== Television ===
Year	Title	Role	Notes
2004	Linha Direta	Manuel's girlfriend	Episode: "Máscaras de Chumbo"
2005	América	Drica	
2006	Sinhá Moça	Maria das Dores (Das Dores)	
2006	O Profeta	Professora Gilda	
2007	Duas Caras	Sabrina	
2008	Casos e Acasos	Marta	Episode: "Quem Passou a Noite Comigo?"
2009	Paraíso	Candida (Candinha)	
2010	Tempos Modernos	Tita Bicalho	
2011	Fina Estampa	Dagmar dos Anjos	
2012	As Brasileiras	Marlene	Episode: "A Sambista da BR- 116"
2012	Salve Jorge	Júlia Campos Albuquerque (Julinha)	
2014	Império	Juliane Alves Matos (Juju Popular)	
2015	A Regra do Jogo	Indira Dourado	
2017	Dança dos Famosos	Participant	
2018	3%	Glória's mother	
2018	O Tempo Não Para	Cairu	
2021	The Masked Singer Brasil	Arara (contestant = 3rd place )	Season 1
2024	Família é Tudo	Lucimeire Mancini "Lulu"	

=== Films ===
Year	Title	Role
2008	Última Parada 174	Marisa
2009	The Assailant	Teresa
2009	Flordelis - Basta uma Palavra para Mudar	Vânia
2018	O Segredo de Davi	Luiza

=== Internet ===
Year	Title	Role	Notes
2019	Zodíaca: O Monólogo Definitivo de Cada Signo	Ariana	Episode: "A Ariana"
2020	Sofia	Sofia	Spotify original series
