= O Tempo Não Para =

Brazilian telenovela

- Also known as: Crashing Into the Future
- Genre: Telenovela; Period drama Romantic comedy
- Created by: Mario Teixeira
- Directed by: Leonardo Nogueira
- Starring: Juliana Paiva; Nicolas Prattes; Cleo Pires; Edson Celulari; Rosi Campos; Christiane Torloni; Carol Castro; Marcos Pasquim; Felipe Simas; Maria Eduarda de Carvalho; Kiko Mascarenhas; Eva Wilma; Regiane Alves; João Baldasserini; Adriane Galisteu
- Opening theme: "Eu Nasci Há Dez Mil Anos Atrás" by Ivete Sangalo
- Country of origin: Brazil
- Original language: Portuguese
- No. of episodes: 156 (95 International version)

Production
- Camera setup: Multi-camera
- Running time: 36–49 minutes
- Production company: Estúdios Globo

Original release
- Network: TV Globo
- Release: 31 July 2018 – 28 January 2019

O Tempo Não Para (English: Crashing Into the Future) is a Brazilian telenovela produced and broadcast by TV Globo. It premiered on 31 July 2018, replacing Deus Salve o Rei, and ended on 28 January 2019, being replaced by Verão 90. It was created by Mario Teixeira in collaboration with Bíbi Da Pieve, Tarcísio Lara Puiati, Marcos Lazarini, Marcelo Travesso, and Adriano Melo. The artistic director is Leonardo Nogueira.

It stars Juliana Paiva, Nicolas Prattes, Cleo Pires, Edson Celulari, Rosi Campos, Christiane Torloni, Carol Castro, Eva Wilma, Regiane Alves, João Baldasserini, and Adriane Galisteu in the main roles.

== Plot ==
The story begins in 1886 and features the Sabino Machado family, who live in São Paulo. The family owns several plots of land for gold and ore mining, as well as investments in telephony. The family embarks on the Europe-bound Albatross, one of the safest ships of the time. Dom Sabino (Edson Celulari) plans to visit the shipyard he bought in England, keeping his daughter Marocas (Juliana Paiva) away from the city's talk after she refused a wedding at the altar. The ship detours for a brief visit to Patagonia, but it collides with an iceberg.

The ship is shipwrecked, and most of the passengers freeze due to the low water temperature. There are thirteen people on board: the Sabino Machado family, comprising Dom Sabino, Dona Agustina (Rosi Campos), Marocas, and twins Nico (Raphaela Alvitos) and Kiki (Nathalia Rodrigues); slaves Damásia (Aline Dias), Cairu (Cris Vianna), Cesária (Olivia Araujo), Menelau (David Junior), and Cecílio (Maicon Rodrigues); bookkeeper Teófilo (Kiko Mascarenhas); preceptor Miss Celine (Maria Eduarda de Carvalho); young Bento (Bruno Montaleone); and Pirate the dog.

132 years later, a large block of ice approaches Guarujá beach in São Paulo. Samuca (Nicolas Prattes) is a businessman involved in social causes and the owner of the SamVita Holding and the Vita Foundation, which focuses on recycling. Samuca first sees the ice block while surfing. He is soon fascinated by the frozen face of Marocas. When a fissure threatens to break the ice block, Samuca – wanting to save Marocas – clings to the block and is drawn by the current to the bottom, arriving at the fictional Red Island. The other frozen humans are taken to Criotec, a laboratory specializing in cryogenics. The ice block's arrival generates curiosity and stirs a national commotion. Gradually, each of the frozen humans wake up, facing a new contemporary reality.

== Cast ==
- Juliana Paiva as Maria Marcolina "Marocas" Sabino Machado
- Nicolas Prattes as Samuel "Samuca" Tercena de Faria
- Cleo Pires as Betina Carvalhal
- Edson Celulari as Teotônio Augusto Sabino Machado "Dom Sabino"
- Rosi Campos as Agostina Sabino Machado
- Christiane Torloni as Carmen Tercena
- Carol Castro as Comandante Waleska Tibério Souto "Wal"
- Eva Wilma as Petra Vaisánen
- João Baldasserini as Emílio Inglês de Souza and Lúcio Inglês de Souza
- Regiane Alves as Mariacarla Borelli
- Milton Gonçalves as Eliseu Emerenciano
- Marcos Pasquim as Marino Santiago
- Alexandra Richter as Monalisa Santiago
- Adriane Galisteu as Zelda Larocque / Zelda Mirtila Lourenço
- Luiz Fernando Guimarães as Dr. Amadeu Baroni
- Maria Eduarda de Carvalho as Celine Elizabeth Fielding "Miss Celine"
- Felipe Simas as Elmo Viégas
- Kiko Mascarenhas as Teófilo Magalhães Quaresma
- Rafaela Mandelli as Helen Azeredo
- Raphael Viana as Capitão Mateus Gonzaga
- Solange Couto as Albina Tibério Souto
- Raphaela Alvitos as Maria Nicolina "Nico" Sabino Machado
- Natthália Gonçalves as Maria Quitéria "Kiki" Sabino Machado
- Olívia Araújo as Cesária
- Cris Vianna as Cairu
- Lucy Ramos as Vanda Lorde
- Carol Macedo as Paulina Emerenciano da Silva
- Bruno Montaleone as Francisco Bento de Castro Domingue
- Aline Dias as Damásia
- Micael Borges as Laércio "Lalá" Batista Emerenciano
- Talita Younan as Vera Lúcia Ribeiro
- Wagner Santisteban as Pedro Parede
- David Junior as Menelau Sabino Machado
- Maicon Rodrigues as Cecílio Sabino Machado
- Juliana Alves as Maria José Viana "Mazé"
- Rui Ricardo Diaz as Adam Emerenciano da Silva "Barão"
- Malu Falangola as Natália "Nat" Figueiroa
- Ricardo Duque as Florêncio
- Bia Montez as Januza Palhares
- Cyria Coentro as Marciana
- Max Lima as Omar
- Fhelipe Gomes as Lucas
- João Fernandes as Gabiru
- Cláudio Mendes as Herberto Douglas
- Beatriz Campos as Agnese

== Soundtrack ==
O Tempo Não Para (Trilha Sonora da Novela)

Soundtrack album by Various artists
- Released: 24 August 2018
- Length: 60:14
- Label: Som Livre

O Tempo Não Para (Trilha Sonora da Novela) is the soundtrack of the telenovela, released on 24 August 2018 by Som Livre.

No.	Title	Artist(s)	Length
1.	"Eu Nasci Há Dez Mil Anos Atrás"	Ivete Sangalo	4:06
2.	"O Tempo Não Para"	Elza Soares	4:16
3.	"Me Sinto Ótima"	Banda do Mar	3:50
4.	"Mulher Feita"	Projota	3:13
5.	"Impossível Acreditar Que Perdi Você"	Vanessa da Mata	2:26
6.	"Baby, Eu Queria"	Marcella Fogaça & Nando Reis	3:01
7.	"Raindrops Keep Fallin' on My Head"	Dan Torres	2:37
8.	"You Sexy Thing"	Hot Chocolate	4:04
9.	"No Excuses"	Meghan Trainor	2:32
10.	"25 Reasons"	Louis Berry	3:25
11.	"It's the End of the World as We Know It (And I Feel Fine)"	R.E.M.	4:06
12.	"Paradise"	George Ezra	3:42
13.	"Totalmente Tchá Tchá Tchá"	Silvia Machete	3:49
14.	"Hanging Loose"	Ina Forsman	3:18
15.	"Tu Veux ou Tu Veux Pas (Nem Vem Que não Tem)"	Valerie Lu	3:33
16.	"Desde Que o Samba É Samba"	Diogo Nogueira & Hamilton de Holanda	4:17
17.	"Se Você Pensa"	Simone Mazzer & Cotonete	3:59
Total length:			60:14

== Ratings ==
Season	Timeslot (BRT/AMT)	Episodes	First aired		Last aired		Avg. viewers (points)
Season	Timeslot (BRT/AMT)	Episodes	Date	Viewers (points)	Date	Viewers (points)	Avg. viewers (points)
1	Monday—Saturday 7:35 pm	156	31 July 2018	32	28 January 2019	25	24.1

According to IBOPE's consolidated data, the premiere recorded a viewership rating of 31.9 points and a 46% share in São Paulo, the highest viewership indices in the time slot since 2012. In Rio de Janeiro, it recorded 34 points and a 49% share, the highest rating since 2010.

Preceded by Deus Salve o Rei; 9 January 2018–30 July 2018	Globo 7 p.m. timeslot telenovela 31 July 2018–28 January 2019	Succeeded by Verão 90; 29 January 2019–Present
