= Deus Salve o Rei =

Brazilian telenovela

- Genre: Telenovela; Period drama Adventure
- Created by: Daniel Adjafre
- Written by: Sérgio Marques; Angélica Lopes; Dino Cantelli; Cláudia Gomes; Péricles Barros
- Directed by: Fabrício Mamberti
- Starring: Marina Ruy Barbosa; Bruna Marquezine; Johnny Massaro; Rômulo Estrela; Caio Blat; Tatá Werneck; Ricardo Pereira; Tarcísio Filho; Fernanda Nobre; Marina Moschen; José Fidalgo; Rosamaria Murtinho; Marco Nanini
- Opening theme: "Scarborough Fair" by Aurora
- Country of origin: Brazil
- Original language: Portuguese
- No. of episodes: 174; 80 (International version)

Production
- Production location: Rio de Janeiro
- Camera setup: Multi-camera
- Running time: 36–49 minutes
- Production company: Estúdios Globo

Original release
- Network: TV Globo
- Release: 9 January – 30 July 2018

Deus Salve o Rei (English: God Save the King) is a Brazilian telenovela produced and broadcast by TV Globo. It premiered on 9 January 2018, replacing Pega Pega, and ended on 30 July 2018, being replaced by O Tempo Não Para. Created by Daniel Adjafre, it has artistic direction by Fabrício Mamberti, with the intention to capitalize on the success of Game of Thrones.

It stars Marina Ruy Barbosa, Bruna Marquezine, Rômulo Estrela, Ricardo Pereira, Johnny Massaro, Caio Blat, José Fidalgo, Tatá Werneck, and Special Participations Rosamaria Murtinho, Marco Nanini.

== Production ==
=== Casting ===
Agatha Moreira had been chosen as Amália's interpreter but was replaced by Marina Ruy Barbosa after TV Globo reassigned actors scaled initially to O Sétimo Guardião by Aguinaldo Silva, which was later cancelled after controversy over plagiarism.

Renato Góes was initially cast as Afonso, but left during the production stage and was replaced by Rômulo Estrela.

=== Set design ===
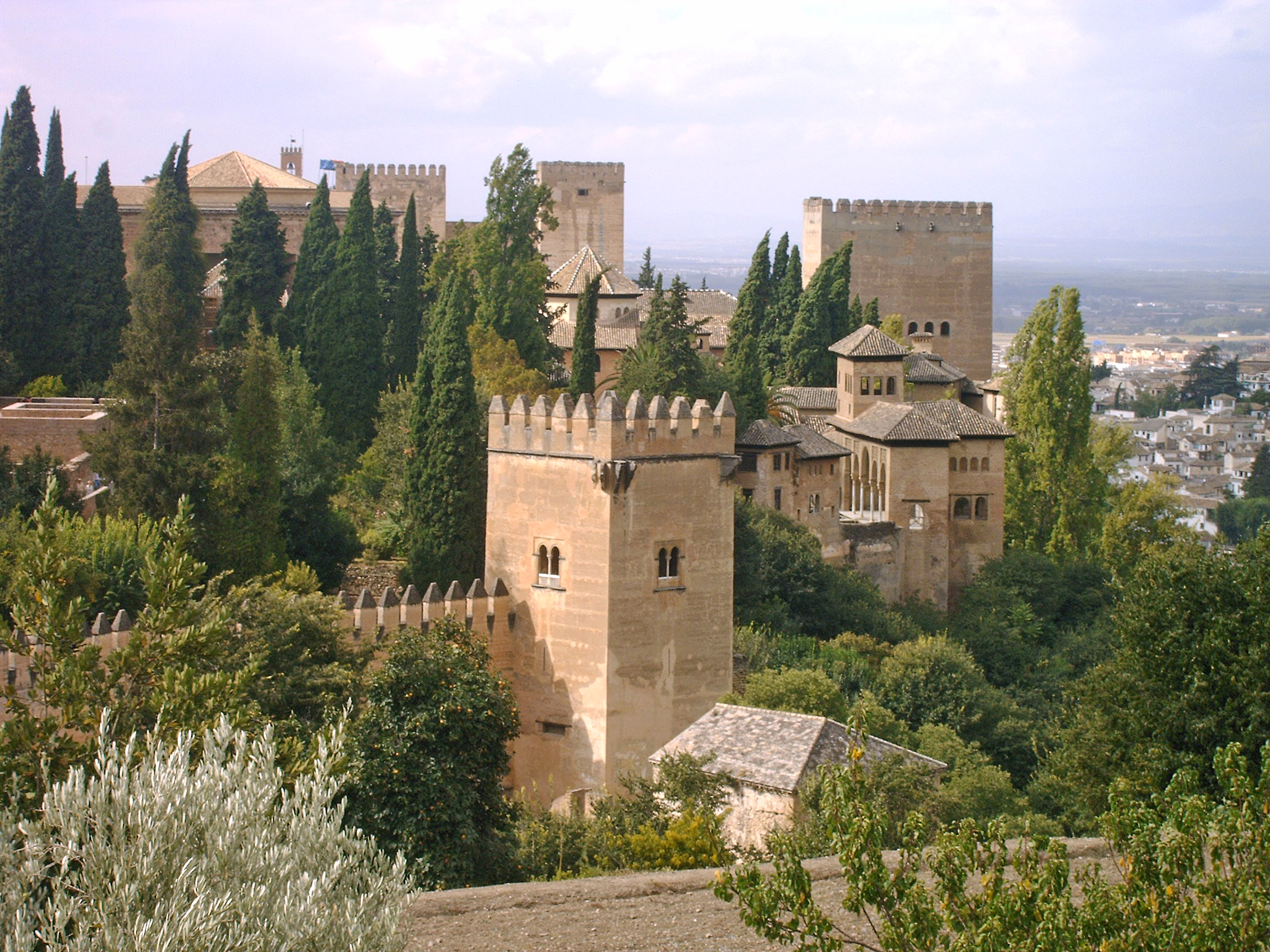
The Alhambra castle inspired the castles designed in the telenovela.

Originally planned that part of the cast would be sent to Europe to begin principal photography, the Globo management judged that, with the inflated high value of the euro, together with all the expenses that come with it in all the sectors in Brazil, it would exceed the estimated budget. Only the recording and effects team was sent out of the country to capture aerial scenes of the woods and mountains to be superimposed on scenes recorded in the Projac studios in Brazil. In March 2017, the recording crew traveled to Spain, Scotland and Iceland to capture the external scenes, as in ancient castles and historically preserved villages. The scenographic city was set up in the Globo Studios, in Rio de Janeiro, with a total of 1,8 thousand square meters. Scenes that were supposed to look external were actually filmed by chroma keying the images taken in Europe were digitally added, including forests, villages and pastures.

== Plot ==
The medieval plot presents the fictional kingdoms of Montemor and Artena. The kingdoms have an agreement to supply water, which is scarce in Montemor but is abundant in Artena. In return, Montemor supplies ore to Artena. This agreement lasts until the death of the queen of Montemor, Crisélia (Rosamaria Murtinho), that will shake the peace between the kingdoms. Afonso (Rômulo Estrela) is the crown prince of Montemor and, from childhood, was raised to assume the throne; honoured and fair, he is the opposite of his younger brother—the irresponsible and inconsequential Rodolfo (Johnny Massaro), who only thinks about stewardship. After falling in love with a plebeian from Artena named Amália (Marina Ruy Barbosa), Afonso abdicates the throne, giving it to his unprepared brother. This makes relations with the neighbouring kingdom even more fragile. This will open the opportunity for Catarina (Bruna Marquezine) to expand her ambitious plans in Montemor. She is the spoiled and ambitious princess and daughter of the wise and benevolent King Augusto (Marco Nanini), of Artena.

== Cast ==
=== Main ===
- Marina Ruy Barbosa as Amália Giordano
- Rômulo Estrela as Afonso de Monferrato, King of Montemor
- Bruna Marquezine as Catarina de Lurton, Queen of Artena and Montemor
- Johnny Massaro as Rodolfo de Monferrato, King of Alcaluz and Prince of Montemor
- Tatá Werneck as Lucrécia de Vilarosso, Princess of Alcaluz
- Ricardo Pereira as Virgílio Salazar
- Marco Nanini as Augusto de Lurton, King of Artena
- Caio Blat as Cássio
- Alexandre Borges as Otávio de Cáseres, King of Lastrilha
- Fernanda Nobre as Diana de Semineli
- Bia Arantes as Brice
- Marina Moschen as Selena de Cáseres
- Vinícius Redd as Thiago Giordano
- Débora Olivieri as Constância Giordano
- Giulio Lopes as Martinho Giordano
- Marcello Airoldi as Romero
- Giovanni Di Lorenzi as Ulisses
- Leandro Daniel as Petrônio
- Daniel Warren as Orlando
- Monique Alfradique as Glória
- Betty Gofman as Nalanda (Naná)
- Marcos Oliveira as Heráclito de Fernandes, Count of Alcaluz
- Mel Maia as Agnes
- João Vithor Oliveira as Saulo
- Rafael Primot as Osiel
- Carolina Ferman as Lucíola Tretino
- Tobias Carrieres as Levi
- Tarcísio Filho as Demétrio
- Dayse Pozato as Betânia
- Maria Manoella as Mirtes
- Aramis Trindade as Olegário
- Pascoal da Conceição as Lupércio
- Cristiana Pompeo as Matilda
- Walter Breda as Enoque
- Rafa Vachaud as Eustáquio
- Isadora Ferrite as Brumela
- Júlia Guerra as Latrine
- Liéser Touma as Timóteo
- Ancelmo Gonçalves as Oráculo

=== Guest cast ===
- Rosamaria Murtinho as Crisélia De Monferrato, Queen of Montemor
- José Fidalgo as Constantino De Artanza, Duke of Vicenza
- Vinicius Calderoni as Istvan, Marquess of Córdona
- Paula Fernandes as Rosana
- Renata Dominguez as Belisa
- Caco Ciocler as Hermes
- Junior Prata as Fúlvio Brancatti
- André Segatti as Henri
- Ilya São Paulo as Nadja
- Rosa Marya Colin as Mandingueira
- Joana Borges as Tila
- Rita Elmôr as Larissa
- Ricardo Blat as Issandro
- André Segatti as Eloy
- Naruna Costa as Samara
- Ana Paula Botelho as Muriel
- Gabriel Palhares as Tácitus
- Anne Berg as Lurdes
- Cláudio Garcia as Helvio
- Fifo Benicasa as Tirso
- Samuel Vieira as Josafá
- Márcia Manfredini as Rebecca
- Marcelo Müller as Julião
- Priscila Castello Branco as Theodora
- Ricardo Lyra Jr as Hugo
- Jack Berraquero as Valentim
- Antônio Barboza as Simão
- Adriana Bellonga as Domingas
- Camille Leite as Geórgia
- Joana Borges as Tila
- Jaedson Bahia as Delano

== Soundtrack ==
Deus Salve o Rei — Música Original de Alexandre de Faria

Soundtrack album by Various artists
- Released: 4 May 2018
- Length: 63:28
- Label: Som Livre

Deus Salve o Rei — Música Original de Alexandre de Faria was released on 4 May 2018 by Som Livre.

No.	Title	Artist(s)	Length
1.	"Scarborough Fair"	Aurora	3:29
2.	"Watch It All Fade"	Gavin James	3:40
3.	"The Touch of Freedom" (instrumental)	Alexandre de Faria	5:11
4.	"Fields of Montemor (Mo Ghile Mear)" (instrumental)	Alexandre de Faria	3:32
5.	"Tant" (instrumental)	Alexandre de Faria	3:48
6.	"War Canticles" (instrumental)	Alexandre de Faria	3:14
7.	"Chanson" (instrumental)	Alexandre de Faria	4:00
8.	"Drums of Fight" (instrumental)	Alexandre de Faria	3:11
9.	"La Nouvelle Danse" (instrumental)	Alexandre de Faria	3:07
10.	"Rodolph, the Wise" (instrumental)	Alexandre de Faria	2:32
11.	"Some Glory" (instrumental)	Alexandre de Faria	2:50
12.	"Cantigas de Santa Maria Nº 119 e 77" (instrumental)	Alexandre de Faria	1:50
13.	"Ecco La Primavera" (instrumental)	Alexandre de Faria	3:34
14.	"The Little Cat’s March" (instrumental)	Alexandre de Faria	2:34
15.	"Fantasia Nº 3 Para Alaúde" (instrumental)	Alexandre de Faria	2:22
16.	"Constantino" (instrumental)	Alexandre de Faria	2:13
17.	"Adventurous" (instrumental)	Alexandre de Faria	2:28
18.	"The Night" (instrumental)	Alexandre de Faria	5:53
19.	"Scarborough Fair" (instrumental)	Alexandre de Faria	4:00
Total length:			63:28

== Ratings ==
Season	Timeslot (BRT/AMT)	Episodes	First aired		Last aired		Avg. viewers (points)
Season	Timeslot (BRT/AMT)	Episodes	Date	Viewers (points)	Date	Viewers (points)	Avg. viewers (points)
1	Monday—Saturday 7:40 pm	174	9 January 2018	29.3	30 July 2018	34.2	25.6

Preceded by Pega Pega; 6 June 2017–8 January 2018	Globo 7 p.m. timeslot telenovela 9 January 2018–30 July 2018	Succeeded by O Tempo Não Para; 31 July 2018–28 January 2019
