= Priscilla Alcantara =

Brazilian singer (born 1996)

Priscilla
- Born: Priscilla Alcântara Silva Fonseca; 19 June 1996 (age 30); Itapecerica da Serra, São Paulo, Brazil
- Genres: Pop, Pop rock, Indie Pop, R&B, Contemporary R&B, Reguetón
- Occupations: Singer, songwriter, media personality, actress

Priscilla Alcântara Silva Fonseca, or simply Priscilla (Portuguese: [pɾiˈsilɐ awˈkɐ̃taɾɐ]; born 19 June 1996) is a Brazilian singer, television personality and actress.

== Biography ==
Born in Itapecerica da Serra, Alcantara became first known in 2005, when as a child she won the SBT television musical contest Código Fama and then took part in its Mexican version Código F.A.M.A.. She then hosted several programs on SBT, notably the children show Bom Dia & Companhia, for which she won a Prêmio Jovem Brasileiro in 2010.

In 2008, Alcantara released her first album, O início. Her 2018 song "Me refez" was the first Brazilian Christian music song to enter the global Top 200 of Spotify. In 2020, her album Gente was nominated for Best Portuguese Language Christian Album at the 20th Annual Latin Grammy Awards. In 2021, she won the first season of the show The Masked Singer Brasil. In 2023, she played Carmen Miranda in the telenovela Amor Perfeito.

== Personal life ==
She is a São Paulo FC fan.

== Discography ==
Albums

- O Início (2008)
- Meu Sonho de Criança (2010)
- Pra Não Me Perder (2012)
- Até Sermos Um (2015)
- SML (EP, 2016)
- Gente (2018)
- O Final da História de Linda Bagunça (EP, 2019)
- Você Aprendeu a Amar? (2021)
- Tem Dias (Expansão) (EP, 2021)
- Priscilla (2024)
- Eco (2026)

== Tours ==
Concerts
Year	Title
2008–09	Turnê O Início
2010	Turnê Meu Sonho De Criança
2011	Turnê Priscilla Alcântara 2011
2012–13	Turnê Pra Não Me Perder
2014	Turnê Priscilla Alcântara 2014
2022	Priscilla Ao Vivo
2025	Tudo É Música

Festival
Year	Title
2016–19	ASU
2025–	The Town

== Filmography ==
=== Television ===
Year	Title	Role	Notes	Ref.
2005	Código Fama	Participant (Winner)	Season 1	
2005	Código Fama México	Participant (4th place)	Season 3	
2005–13	Bom Dia & Companhia	Presenter		
2007–08	Carrossel Animado	Presenter		
2007–08	Domingo Animado	Presenter		
2011	Cantando no SBT	Presenter		
2011–2013	Sábado Animado	Presenter		
2012	Dia No Parque	Presenter		
2021	The Masked Singer Brasil	Participant (Winner)	Season 1	
2022–2023	The Masked Singer Brasil	Presenter		
2022	TVZ	Presenter		
2023	Amor Perfeito	Carmen Miranda	Episode: "March 20–21"	
2026	The Voice Brasil	Coach Guest	Season 14	

=== Film ===
Year	Title	Role	Notes	Ref.
2008	Space Chimps	Luna	Brazilian Dubbing	
2016	Priscilla: 10 Anos Acústico	Herself	Special show	
2016	João 17	Herself	Short film	
2020	Quando O Sol Se Por	Jeni	Feature film	
2022	DC League of Super-Pets	PB	Brazilian Dubbing	

=== Internet ===
Year	Title	Role	Notes	Ref.
2015–2017	Vlog de Tudo	Herself	YouTube	
2015	Desconfinados	Herself	Irmã	

== Bibliography ==
- 2016 - Livro de Tudo - Editora Ágape
