= Nicolas Prattes =

Brazilian actor (born 1997)

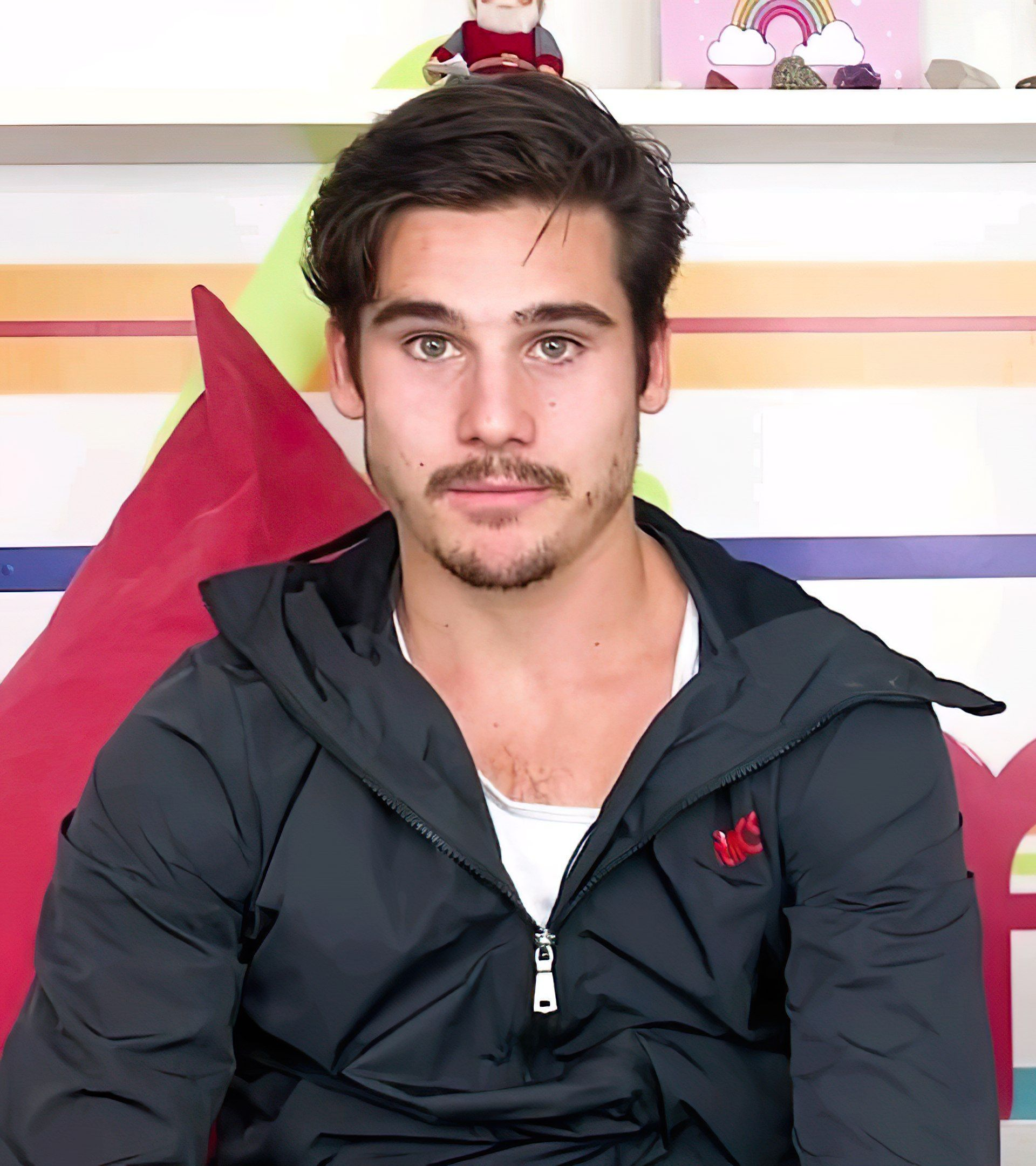
- Prattes in 2020
- Born: Nicolas Prattes Bittencourt Pires; May 4, 1997 (age 29); Rio de Janeiro, Brazil
- Occupations: Actor; singer
- Years active: 2000, 2011–present
- Spouse: Sabrina Sato (m. 2025)

Nicolas Prattes Bittencourt Pires (Brazilian Portuguese: [ˈnikolɐs ˈpɾatʃis]; born May 4, 1997) is a Brazilian actor and singer.

== Career ==
He started his acting career at the age of 10. At the age of 13 he played small roles in theatrical performances in Rio de Janeiro. He also studied at the New York Film Academy in Los Angeles, California.

In 2015 he debuted on television as the protagonist of the 23rd season of Malhação.

== Personal life ==
Since February 2024, he has been dating the TV host, model and former reality star Sabrina Sato. According to Prattes, their relationship began during a trip to Costa Rica.

== Filmography ==
=== Television ===
Year	Title	Role	Notes
2000	Terra Nostra	Francesco Splendore Batistela "Francesquinho"	
2015–2016	Malhação: Seu Lugar no Mundo	Rodrigo Alcântara	Season 23
2015	Malhação: Os Desatinados	Rodrigo Alcântara	
2016–2017	Rock Story	Zacarias "Zac" Silveira Santiago	
2017	Dança dos Famosos	Participant	Season 14 (3rd place)
2018–2019	O Tempo Não Para	Samuel "Samuca" Tercena de Faria	
2019–2020	Éramos Seis	Alfredo Abílio de Lemos	
2021	The Masked Singer Brasil	Monstro	Season 1 (2nd place)
2022–2023	Todas as Flores	Diego da Silva / Edu	
2023–2024	Vicky e a Musa	Davi Cardine Santos	
2023–2024	Fuzuê	Miguel de Braga e Silva	
2023	Rio Connection	Giovanni "Gio" Nicola	
2024–2025	Mania de Você	Rudá	
2026	A Nobreza do Amor	Casemiro Bonafé Júnior "Mirinho"	

=== Film ===
Year	Title	Role
2018	O Segredo de Davi	Davi
2020	Flush	Tom
2022	Pronto, Falei	Renato
2025	O Advogado de Deus	Daniel

== Stage ==
Year	Title	Role
2011	O Rei Leão 2 – O Musical	
2014	Meninos e Meninas	Boy
2015	Os Saltimbancos Trapalhões: O Musical	Pedro
2017	Beatles num Céu de Diamantes	Singer

== Discography ==
Title	Year
"Vambora" (Gesualdi feat. Nicolas Prattes)	2018
"Sem Pressão" (Gesualdi feat. Nicolas Prattes)	2018

== Awards and nominations ==
Year	Award	Category	Work	Result	References
2015	Prêmio F5	Handsome boy of the year	Malhação (Season 23)	Nominated	
2016	Prêmio Jovem Brasileiro	Best Young Actor	Malhação (Season 23)	Nominated	
2016	Prêmio Extra de Televisão	Male Revelation	Malhação (Season 23)	Nominated	
2016	Meus Prêmios Nick	Gato Trendy	Malhação (Season 23)	Nominated	
