= Dança dos Famosos season 18 =

Dança dos Famosos
- Season 18
- Celebrity winner: Paolla Oliveira
- Professional winner: Leandro Azevedo
- No. of episodes: 16

Release
- Original network: TV Globo
- Original release: May 16 – August 29, 2021

Season chronology
- ← Previous; Season 17 Next → Season 19

Super Dança dos Famosos is the eighteenth season of the Brazilian reality television show Dança dos Famosos which premiered on May 16, 2021, at 6:00 / 5:00 p.m. (BRT / AMT) on TV Globo, following a two-week cast reveal special that aired on May 2–9.

It is the first season to feature an "all-star" cast, in which previous celebrities who have competed on the show have another chance to win the competition. However, 9 of the returning finalists had already won the title in prior seasons (Juliana Didone, Robson Caetano, Christiane Torloni, Paolla Oliveira, Rodrigo Simas, Marcello Melo Jr., Viviane Araújo, Maria Joana and Lucy Ramos).

Season 12 saw the most returning contestants, with 3 out of the 18 contestants (Arthur Aguiar, Mariana Santos and Viviane Araújo). Christiane Torloni is the only contestant reunited with her original partner.

It was the last season hosted by Fausto Silva and airing as a segment on Domingão do Faustão; reportedly due to a medical issue, Tiago Leifert filled in as host on June 13, 2021—the first time Silva had ever missed an episode of Domingão. It was subsequently announced on June 17 that Faustão had left TV Globo, Domingão do Faustão had been cancelled and the remainder of Super Dança dos Famosos would air as a standalone series, with Leifert remaining as host.

On August 29, 2021, actress Paolla Oliveira & Leandro Azevedo won the competition over actor Rodrigo Simas & Nathalia Ramos and actress Dandara Mariana & Diego Maia, who took 2nd and 3rd place respectively, thus becoming the show's first two-time champion. In addition, Leandro Azevedo became the first professional to win the competition three times.

== Couples ==
The first two celebrities (Christiane Torloni and Paolla Oliveira) were confirmed on April 30. The first batch of celebrities (Arthur, Claudia, Maria, Mariana, Marcello, Odilon, Paolla, Rodrigo and Sophia) was announced on May 2. On May 9, the final batch of celebrities (Carmo, Christiane, Dandara, Juliana, Lucy, Nelson, Robson, Tiago and Viviane) was also revealed.

| Celebrity | Notability (known for) | Previous finish | Professional | Status |
|---|---|---|---|---|
| Claudia Ohana | Actress | Season 9 runner-up | Heron Leal | Eliminated 1st on May 16, 2021 |
| Mariana Santos | Actress | Season 12 third place | Élcio Bonazzi | Eliminated 2nd on May 16, 2021 |
| Juliana Didone Returned on July 11 | Actress | Season 2 champion | Igor Maximiliano | Eliminated 3rd on May 23, 2021 |
| Rodrigo Simas Returned on June 27 | Actor | Season 9 champion | Nathália Ramos | Eliminated 4th on May 23, 2021 |
| Arthur Aguiar | Actor | Season 12 runner-up | Tati Scarletti | Withdrew on May 30, 2021 |
| Viviane Araújo Returned on July 11 | Actress | Season 12 champion | Adeilton Ribeiro | Eliminated 5th on May 30, 2021 |
| Carmo Dalla Vecchia | Actor | Season 4 third place | Bruna Santos | Eliminated 6th on June 6, 2021 |
| Nelson Freitas | Actor | Season 8 runner-up | Paula Santos | Eliminated 7th on June 6, 2021 |
| Robson Caetano Returned on June 27 | Olympic sprinter | Season 3 champion | Beatriz Larrat | Eliminated 8th on June 13, 2021 |
| Sophia Abrahão Returned on July 4 | Actress | Season 13 runner-up | Zazá Ferrer | Eliminated 9th on June 13, 2021 |
| Odilon Wagner | Actor | Season 8 third place | Yanca Guimarães; Yasmin Marinho (week 6) | Eliminated 10th on June 20, 2021 |
| Tiago Abravanel Returned on July 4 | Actor | Season 10 third place | Brennda Martins | Eliminated 11th on June 20, 2021 |
| Robson Caetano | Olympic sprinter | Season 3 champion | Larissa Lannes; Beatriz Larrat (week 5 & 7) | Eliminated 12th on July 18, 2021 |
| Juliana Didone | Actress | Season 2 champion | Igor Maximiliano | Eliminated 13th on July 25, 2021 |
| Christiane Torloni | Actress | Season 5 champion | Álvaro Reis | Eliminated 14th on August 1, 2021 |
| Lucy Ramos | Actress | Season 17 champion | Jefferson Bilisco; Leo Gomes (week 4) | Eliminated 15th on August 8, 2021 |
| Marcello Melo Jr. | Actor | Season 11 champion | Ana Paula Guedes; Jaque Ciocci (week 2) | Eliminated 16th on August 8, 2021 |
| Sophia Abrahão | Actress | Season 13 runner-up | Zazá Ferrer; Bruno Franchi (week 11) | Eliminated 17th on August 15, 2021 |
| Tiago Abravanel | Actor | Season 10 third place | Brennda Martins | Eliminated 18th on August 15, 2021 |
| Maria Joana | Actress | Season 14 champion | Marcus Viana | Withdrew on August 16, 2021 |
| Viviane Araújo | Actress | Season 12 champion | Rodrigo Oliveira; Adeilton Ribeiro (week 3) | Eliminated 19th on August 22, 2021 |
| Dandara Mariana | Actress | Season 16 runner-up | Diego Maia | Third place on August 29, 2021 |
| Rodrigo Simas | Actor | Season 9 champion | Nathália Ramos | Runner-up on August 29, 2021 |
| Paolla Oliveira | Actress | Season 6 champion | Leandro Azevedo | Winner on August 29, 2021 |

== Elimination chart ==
| Couple | Place | Qualifiers | | | | | | Dance-offs | | | Finals | | | | | | |
| Couple | Place | 1 | 2 | 3 | 4 | 5 | 6 | 7 | 8 | 9 | 10 | 11 | 12 | 13 | 14 | 15 | 16 |
|---|---|---|---|---|---|---|---|---|---|---|---|---|---|---|---|---|---|
| Paolla & Leandro | 1 | —N/a | —N/a | 99.9 | | | | | | | 99.9 | —N/a | —N/a | —N/a | 100 | —N/a | 100 |
| Rodrigo & Nathália | 2 | —N/a | 99.8 | | | | | 49.8 | —N/a | —N/a | 99.7 | —N/a | —N/a | 99.8 | —N/a | —N/a | 100 |
| Dandara & Diego | 3 | —N/a | —N/a | —N/a | —N/a | 100 | | | | | —N/a | —N/a | 99.8 | —N/a | —N/a | 99.9 | 99.9 |
| Viviane & Rodrigo | 4 | —N/a | —N/a | 99.3 | | | | | | 50.0 | —N/a | —N/a | 99.9 | —N/a | —N/a | 99.7 | |
| Maria & Marcus | 5 | 99.7 | | | | | | | | | —N/a | 99.6 | —N/a | —N/a | —N/a | — | |
| Tiago & Brennda | 6 | —N/a | —N/a | —N/a | —N/a | —N/a | 99.9 | | 50.0 | —N/a | —N/a | —N/a | 99.8 | —N/a | 99.9 | | |
| Sophia & Zazá | 7 | —N/a | —N/a | —N/a | —N/a | 100 | | | 49.9 | —N/a | —N/a | 99.4 | —N/a | —N/a | 99.6 | | |
| Marcello & Ana Paula | 8 | —N/a | 99.9 | | | | | | | | —N/a | 99.6 | —N/a | 99.8 | | | |
| Lucy & Jefferson | 9 | —N/a | —N/a | —N/a | 100 | | | | | | 99.2 | —N/a | —N/a | 99.5 | | | |
| Christiane & Álvaro | 10 | —N/a | —N/a | —N/a | —N/a | —N/a | 100 | | | | —N/a | —N/a | 98.8 | | | | |
| Juliana & Igor | 11 | —N/a | 99.4 | | | | | | | 49.6 | —N/a | 99.0 | | | | | |
| Robson & Larissa | 12 | —N/a | —N/a | —N/a | —N/a | 99.5 | | 49.6 | —N/a | —N/a | 98.9 | | | | | | |
| Carmo & Bruna | 13 | —N/a | —N/a | —N/a | 99.5 | | | | | 49.8 | | | | | | | |
| Odilon & Yanca | 14 | —N/a | —N/a | —N/a | —N/a | —N/a | 99.8 | | | 49.5 | | | | | | | |
| Arthur & Tati | 15 | —N/a | —N/a | — | | | | | 49.9 | | | | | | | | |
| Claudia & Heron | 15 | 99.0 | | | | | | | 49.8 | | | | | | | | |
| Mariana & Élcio | 17 | 99.1 | | | | | | 49.5 | | | | | | | | | |
| Nelson & Paula | 18 | —N/a | —N/a | —N/a | 99.9 | | | 49.3 | | | | | | | | | |

Key

Lowest score
Highest score
Qualified
Returned
Saved last
Eliminated
Withdrew

Winner
Runner-up
Third place

== Weekly results ==
=== Week 1 ===
Qualifiers 1

- Styles: Forró & Rock

| Artistic judges | | | Technical judges | |
| 1 | 2 | 3 | 4 | 5 |
|---|---|---|---|---|
| Cristina Padiglione | Cléber Machado | Simaria Mendes | J.C. Violla | Camila Lobo |

Running order

Forró
| Couple | Judges' score | | | | | Total score | Studio score | Dance total | Final total | Result |
| Couple | 1 | 2 | 3 | 4 | 5 | Total score | Studio score | Dance total | Final total | Result |
|---|---|---|---|---|---|---|---|---|---|---|
| Maria & Marcus | 10 | 10 | 10 | 9.9 | 9.8 | 49.7 | 9.7 | 59.4 | — | N/A |
| Mariana & Élcio | 10 | 10 | 9.8 | 9.9 | 9.8 | 49.5 | 9.8 | 59.3 | — | N/A |
| Claudia & Heron | 9.9 | 10 | 9.9 | 9.9 | 9.8 | 49.5 | 9.7 | 59.2 | — | N/A |

Rock
| Couple | Judges' score | | | | | Total score | Studio score | Dance total | Final total | Result |
| Couple | 1 | 2 | 3 | 4 | 5 | Total score | Studio score | Dance total | Final total | Result |
|---|---|---|---|---|---|---|---|---|---|---|
| Maria & Marcus | 10 | 10 | 10 | 10 | 10 | 50.0 | 9.9 | 59.9 | 119.3 | Qualified |
| Mariana & Élcio | 9.9 | 10 | 10 | 9.8 | 9.9 | 49.6 | 9.9 | 59.5 | 118.8 | Dance-off |
| Claudia & Heron | 10 | 10 | 9.9 | 9.8 | 9.8 | 49.5 | 10 | 59.5 | 118.7 | Dance-off |

=== Week 2 ===
Qualifiers 2

- Styles: Forró & Rock

| Artistic judges | | | Technical judges | |
| 1 | 2 | 3 | 4 | 5 |
|---|---|---|---|---|
| Carol Ribeiro | Daniel | Maju Coutinho | Anselmo Zolla | Suellem Morimoto |

Running order

Forró
| Couple | Judges' score | | | | | Total score | Studio score | Dance total | Final total | Result |
| Couple | 1 | 2 | 3 | 4 | 5 | Total score | Studio score | Dance total | Final total | Result |
|---|---|---|---|---|---|---|---|---|---|---|
| Rodrigo & Nathália | 10 | 10 | 10 | 9.9 | 10 | 49.9 | 9.9 | 59.8 | — | N/A |
| Juliana & Igor | 10 | 10 | 10 | 9.8 | 9.9 | 49.7 | 9.8 | 59.5 | — | N/A |
| Marcello & Jaque | 10 | 10 | 10 | 10 | 10 | 50.0 | 9.9 | 59.9 | — | N/A |

Rock
| Couple | Judges' score | | | | | Total score | Studio score | Dance total | Final total | Result |
| Couple | 1 | 2 | 3 | 4 | 5 | Total score | Studio score | Dance total | Final total | Result |
|---|---|---|---|---|---|---|---|---|---|---|
| Rodrigo & Nathália | 10 | 10 | 10 | 10 | 9.9 | 49.9 | 9.9 | 59.8 | 119.6 | Dance-off |
| Juliana & Igor | 10 | 10 | 10 | 9.9 | 9.8 | 49.7 | 9.9 | 59.6 | 119.1 | Dance-off |
| Marcello & Jaque | 10 | 10 | 10 | 10 | 9.9 | 49.9 | 9.9 | 59.8 | 119.7 | Qualified |

=== Week 3 ===
Qualifiers 3

- Styles: Forró & Rock

| Artistic judges | | | Technical judges | |
| 1 | 2 | 3 | 4 | 5 |
|---|---|---|---|---|
| Di Ferrero | Julia Gama | Tom Cavalcante | Ivi Pizzott | Inês Bogéa |

Running order

Forró
| Couple | Judges' score | | | | | Total score | Studio score | Dance total | Final total | Result |
| Couple | 1 | 2 | 3 | 4 | 5 | Total score | Studio score | Dance total | Final total | Result |
|---|---|---|---|---|---|---|---|---|---|---|
| Arthur & Tati | Did not perform due to an injury | | | | | | | | — | N/A |
| Viviane & Adeilton | 10 | 9.9 | 10 | 9.9 | 9.9 | 49.7 | 9.8 | 59.5 | — | N/A |
| Paolla & Leandro | 10 | 10 | 10 | 10 | 10 | 50.0 | 10 | 60.0 | — | N/A |

Rock
| Couple | Judges' score | | | | | Total score | Studio score | Dance total | Final total | Result |
| Couple | 1 | 2 | 3 | 4 | 5 | Total score | Studio score | Dance total | Final total | Result |
|---|---|---|---|---|---|---|---|---|---|---|
| Arthur & Tati | Did not perform due to an injury | | | | | | | | 000.0 | Dance-off |
| Viviane & Adeilton | 10 | 9.9 | 9.9 | 9.9 | 9.9 | 49.6 | 9.9 | 59.5 | 119.0 | Dance-off |
| Paolla & Leandro | 10 | 10 | 10 | 9.9 | 10 | 49.9 | 10 | 59.9 | 119.9 | Qualified |

=== Week 4 ===
Qualifiers 4

- Styles: Forró & Rock

| Artistic judges | | | Technical judges | |
| 1 | 2 | 3 | 4 | 5 |
|---|---|---|---|---|
| Alexandra Martins | Miguel Falabella | Sandra Annenberg | Carlinhos de Jesus | Carol Soares |

Running order

Forró
| Couple | Judges' score | | | | | Total score | Studio score | Dance total | Final total | Result |
| Couple | 1 | 2 | 3 | 4 | 5 | Total score | Studio score | Dance total | Final total | Result |
|---|---|---|---|---|---|---|---|---|---|---|
| Carmo & Bruna | 10 | 10 | 10 | 9.9 | 9.8 | 49.7 | 9.8 | 59.7 | — | N/A |
| Lucy & Léo | 10 | 10 | 10 | 10 | 10 | 50.0 | 9.9 | 59.9 | — | N/A |
| Nelson & Paula | 10 | 9.9 | 10 | 10 | 10 | 49.9 | 9.8 | 59.7 | — | N/A |

Rock
| Couple | Judges' score | | | | | Total score | Studio score | Dance total | Final total | Result |
| Couple | 1 | 2 | 3 | 4 | 5 | Total score | Studio score | Dance total | Final total | Result |
|---|---|---|---|---|---|---|---|---|---|---|
| Carmo & Bruna | 10 | 9.9 | 10 | 10 | 9.9 | 49.8 | 9.9 | 59.7 | 119.4 | Dance-off |
| Lucy & Léo | 10 | 10 | 10 | 10 | 10 | 50.0 | 9.9 | 59.9 | 118.8 | Qualified |
| Nelson & Paula | 10 | 10 | 10 | 10 | 10 | 50.0 | 9.9 | 59.9 | 119.6 | Dance-off |

=== Week 5 ===
Qualifiers 5

- Styles: Forró & Rock

| Artistic judges | | | Technical judges | |
| 1 | 2 | 3 | 4 | 5 |
|---|---|---|---|---|
| Antônio Fagundes | Solange Almeida | Luis Maluf | Renato Vieira | Raquel Guarini |

Running order

Forró
| Couple | Judges' score | | | | | Total score | Studio score | Dance total | Final total | Result |
| Couple | 1 | 2 | 3 | 4 | 5 | Total score | Studio score | Dance total | Final total | Result |
|---|---|---|---|---|---|---|---|---|---|---|
| Sophia & Zazá | 10 | 10 | 10 | 10 | 10 | 50.0 | 9.9 | 59.9 | — | N/A |
| Robson & Beatriz | 9.9 | 10 | 10 | 9.9 | 9.9 | 49.7 | 9.8 | 59.5 | — | N/A |
| Dandara & Diego | 10 | 10 | 10 | 10 | 10 | 50.0 | 9.9 | 59.9 | — | N/A |

Rock
| Couple | Judges' score | | | | | Total score | Studio score | Dance total | Final total | Result |
| Couple | 1 | 2 | 3 | 4 | 5 | Total score | Studio score | Dance total | Final total | Result |
|---|---|---|---|---|---|---|---|---|---|---|
| Sophia & Zazá | 10 | 10 | 10 | 10 | 10 | 50.0 | 9.9 | 59.9 | 119.8 | Dance-off |
| Robson & Beatriz | 9.9 | 10 | 10 | 10 | 9.9 | 49.8 | 9.8 | 59.6 | 119.1 | Dance-off |
| Dandara & Diego | 10 | 10 | 10 | 10 | 10 | 50.0 | 10 | 60.0 | 119.9 | Qualified |

=== Week 6 ===
Qualifiers 6

- Styles: Forró & Rock

| Artistic judges | | | Technical judges | |
| 1 | 2 | 3 | 4 | 5 |
|---|---|---|---|---|
| Simone Mendes | Moacyr Franco | Angélica | Carlinhos de Jesus | Claudia Motta |

Running order

Forró
| Couple | Judges' score | | | | | Total score | Studio score | Dance total | Final total | Result |
| Couple | 1 | 2 | 3 | 4 | 5 | Total score | Studio score | Dance total | Final total | Result |
|---|---|---|---|---|---|---|---|---|---|---|
| Tiago & Brennda | 10 | 10 | 10 | 9.9 | 10 | 49.9 | 9.8 | 59.7 | — | N/A |
| Odilon & Yasmin | 10 | 10 | 10 | 9.9 | 9.9 | 49.8 | 9.8 | 59.6 | — | N/A |
| Christiane & Álvaro | 10 | 10 | 10 | 10 | 10 | 50.0 | 9.9 | 59.9 | — | N/A |

Rock
| Couple | Judges' score | | | | | Total score | Studio score | Dance total | Final total | Result |
| Couple | 1 | 2 | 3 | 4 | 5 | Total score | Studio score | Dance total | Final total | Result |
|---|---|---|---|---|---|---|---|---|---|---|
| Tiago & Brennda | 10 | 10 | 10 | 10 | 10 | 50.0 | 9.9 | 59.9 | 119.6 | Dance-off |
| Odilon & Yasmin | 10 | 10 | 10 | 10 | 10 | 50.0 | 9.8 | 59.8 | 119.4 | Dance-off |
| Christiane & Álvaro | 10 | 10 | 10 | 10 | 10 | 50.0 | 10 | 60.0 | 119.9 | Qualified |

=== Week 7 ===
Dance-off 1

- Style: Pop

| Artistic judges | | | Technical judges | |
| 1 | 2 | 3 | 4 | 5 |
|---|---|---|---|---|
| Wesley Safadão | Rafa Kalimann | Caio Ribeiro | Claudia Motta | Carlinhos de Jesus |

Running order

| Couple | Judges' score | | | | | Total score | Studio score | Dance total | Final total | Result |
| Couple | 1 | 2 | 3 | 4 | 5 | Total score | Studio score | Dance total | Final total | Result |
|---|---|---|---|---|---|---|---|---|---|---|
| Mariana & Élcio | 9.9 | 9.8 | 10 | 9.9 | 9.9 | 49.5 | 9.8 | 59.3 | — | Eliminated |
| Robson & Beatriz | 10 | 10 | 9.9 | 9.9 | 9.8 | 49.6 | 9.8 | 59.4 | — | Advanced |
| Nelson & Paula | 10 | 9.8 | 9.9 | 9.9 | 9.7 | 49.3 | 9.8 | 59.1 | — | Eliminated |
| Rodrigo & Nathália | 10 | 9.9 | 10 | 10 | 9.9 | 49.8 | 9.9 | 59.7 | — | Advanced |

=== Week 8 ===
Dance-off 2

- Style: Eurodance

| Artistic judges | | | Technical judges | |
| 1 | 2 | 3 | 4 | 5 |
|---|---|---|---|---|
| Fernanda Gentil | Gil do Vigor | Taís Araújo | Carlinhos de Jesus | Claudia Motta |

Running order

| Couple | Judges' score | | | | | Total score | Studio score | Dance total | Final total | Result |
| Couple | 1 | 2 | 3 | 4 | 5 | Total score | Studio score | Dance total | Final total | Result |
|---|---|---|---|---|---|---|---|---|---|---|
| Arthur & Tati | 10 | 10 | 10 | 9.9 | 10 | 49.9 | 9.7 | 59.6 | — | Eliminated |
| Claudia & Heron | 10 | 10 | 10 | 9.9 | 9.9 | 49.8 | 9.8 | 59.6 | — | Eliminated |
| Tiago & Brennda | 10 | 10 | 10 | 10 | 10 | 50.0 | 9.9 | 59.9 | — | Advanced |
| Sophia & Zazá | 10 | 10 | 10 | 10 | 9.9 | 49.9 | 9.9 | 59.8 | — | Advanced |

=== Week 9 ===
Dance-off 3

- Style: Disco

| Artistic judges | | | Technical judges | |
| 1 | 2 | 3 | 4 | 5 |
|---|---|---|---|---|
| Iza | Ary Fontoura | Fernanda Lima | Carlinhos de Jesus | Claudia Motta |

Running order

| Couple | Judges' score | | | | | Total score | Studio score | Dance total | Final total | Result |
| Couple | 1 | 2 | 3 | 4 | 5 | Total score | Studio score | Dance total | Final total | Result |
|---|---|---|---|---|---|---|---|---|---|---|
| Odilon & Yanca | 10 | 10 | 10 | 9.7 | 9.8 | 49.5 | 9.7 | 59.2 | — | Eliminated |
| Juliana & Igor | 9.9 | 9.9 | 10 | 9.9 | 9.9 | 49.6 | 9.9 | 59.5 | — | Advanced |
| Carmo & Bruna | 10 | 10 | 10 | 9.8 | 9.8 | 49.8 | 9.8 | 59.4 | — | Eliminated |
| Viviane & Rodrigo | 10 | 10 | 10 | 10 | 10 | 50.0 | 9.9 | 59.9 | — | Advanced |

=== Week 10 ===
Quarterfinals 1

- Styles: Pasodoble & Funk

| Artistic judges | | | Technical judges | |
| 1 | 2 | 3 | 4 | 5 |
|---|---|---|---|---|
| Fabiana Karla | André Marques | Carolina Dieckmann | Carlinhos de Jesus | Claudia Motta |

Running order

Pasodoble
| Couple | Judges' score | | | | | Total score | Studio score | Dance total | Final total | Result |
| Couple | 1 | 2 | 3 | 4 | 5 | Total score | Studio score | Dance total | Final total | Result |
|---|---|---|---|---|---|---|---|---|---|---|
| Lucy & Jefferson | 9.8 | 9.9 | 10 | 9.9 | 9.9 | 49.5 | 9.7 | 59.2 | — | N/A |
| Robson & Larissa | 9.9 | 10 | 9.9 | 9.8 | 9.9 | 49.5 | 9.6 | 59.1 | — | N/A |
| Rodrigo & Nathália | 10 | 10 | 10 | 9.9 | 9.9 | 49.8 | 9.8 | 59.6 | — | N/A |
| Paolla & Leandro | 10 | 10 | 10 | 9.9 | 10 | 49.9 | 9.9 | 59.8 | — | N/A |

Funk
| Couple | Judges' score | | | | | Total score | Studio score | Dance total | Final total | Result |
| Couple | 1 | 2 | 3 | 4 | 5 | Total score | Studio score | Dance total | Final total | Result |
|---|---|---|---|---|---|---|---|---|---|---|
| Lucy & Jefferson | 10 | 10 | 10 | 9.9 | 9.9 | 49.8 | 9.8 | 59.6 | 118.8 | 3rd |
| Robson & Larissa | 9.9 | 10 | 10 | 9.9 | 9.8 | 49.6 | 9.8 | 59.4 | 118.5 | Eliminated |
| Rodrigo & Nathália | 10 | 10 | 10 | 9.9 | 10 | 49.9 | 9.9 | 59.8 | 119.4 | 2nd |
| Paolla & Leandro | 10 | 10 | 10 | 9.9 | 10 | 49.9 | 10 | 59.9 | 119.7 | 1st |

=== Week 11 ===
Quarterfinals 2

- Styles: Pasodoble & Funk

| Artistic judges | | | Technical judges | |
| 1 | 2 | 3 | 4 | 5 |
|---|---|---|---|---|
| Paulo Vieira | Vanessa Giácomo | Marcelo Serrado | Carlinhos de Jesus | Claudia Motta |

Running order

Pasodoble
| Couple | Judges' score | | | | | Total score | Studio score | Dance total | Final total | Result |
| Couple | 1 | 2 | 3 | 4 | 5 | Total score | Studio score | Dance total | Final total | Result |
|---|---|---|---|---|---|---|---|---|---|---|
| Marcello & Ana Paula | 9.9 | 10 | 10 | 9.8 | 9.9 | 49.6 | 9.8 | 59.4 | — | N/A |
| Juliana & Igor | 10 | 10 | 10 | 9.7 | 9.7 | 49.4 | 9.9 | 59.3 | — | N/A |
| Sophia & Bruno | 10 | 10 | 10 | 9.9 | 9.8 | 49.7 | 10 | 59.7 | — | N/A |
| Maria & Marcus | 10 | 10 | 10 | 9.9 | 9.9 | 49.8 | 9.9 | 59.7 | — | N/A |

Funk
| Couple | Judges' score | | | | | Total score | Studio score | Dance total | Final total | Result |
| Couple | 1 | 2 | 3 | 4 | 5 | Total score | Studio score | Dance total | Final total | Result |
|---|---|---|---|---|---|---|---|---|---|---|
| Marcello & Ana Paula | 10 | 10 | 10 | 10 | 10 | 50.0 | 10 | 60.0 | 119.4 | 2nd |
| Juliana & Igor | 9.9 | 10 | 9.9 | 9.9 | 9.9 | 49.6 | 9.8 | 59.4 | 118.7 | Eliminated |
| Sophia & Bruno | 9.9 | 10 | 10 | 9.9 | 9.9 | 49.7 | 9.8 | 59.5 | 119.2 | 3rd |
| Maria & Marcus | 10 | 10 | 10 | 9.9 | 9.9 | 49.8 | 10 | 59.8 | 119.5 | 1st |

=== Week 12 ===
Quarterfinals 3

- Styles: Pasodoble & Funk

| Artistic judges | | | Technical judges | |
| 1 | 2 | 3 | 4 | 5 |
|---|---|---|---|---|
| Ana Clara Lima | Érico Brás | Fernanda Souza | Carlinhos de Jesus | Claudia Motta |

Running order

Pasodoble
| Couple | Judges' score | | | | | Total score | Studio score | Dance total | Final total | Result |
| Couple | 1 | 2 | 3 | 4 | 5 | Total score | Studio score | Dance total | Final total | Result |
|---|---|---|---|---|---|---|---|---|---|---|
| Dandara & Diego | 10 | 10 | 10 | 9.9 | 9.9 | 49.8 | 9.8 | 59.6 | — | N/A |
| Tiago & Brennda | 10 | 10 | 10 | 9.8 | 10 | 49.8 | 9.8 | 59.6 | — | N/A |
| Christiane & Álvaro | 9.9 | 9.9 | 10 | 9.9 | 9.8 | 49.5 | 9.9 | 59.4 | — | N/A |
| Viviane & Rodrigo | 10 | 10 | 10 | 10 | 9.9 | 49.9 | 9.9 | 59.8 | — | N/A |

Funk
| Couple | Judges' score | | | | | Total score | Studio score | Dance total | Final total | Result |
| Couple | 1 | 2 | 3 | 4 | 5 | Total score | Studio score | Dance total | Final total | Result |
|---|---|---|---|---|---|---|---|---|---|---|
| Dandara & Diego | 10 | 10 | 10 | 10 | 10 | 50.0 | 10 | 60.0 | 119.6 | 2nd |
| Tiago & Brennda | 10 | 10 | 10 | 10 | 10 | 50.0 | 9.9 | 59.9 | 119.5 | 3rd |
| Christiane & Álvaro | 9.9 | 9.9 | 9.9 | 9.8 | 9.8 | 49.3 | 9.8 | 59.1 | 118.5 | Eliminated |
| Viviane & Rodrigo | 10 | 10 | 10 | 10 | 10 | 50.0 | 9.9 | 59.9 | 119.7 | 1st |

=== Week 13 ===
Semifinals 1

- Styles: Salsa & Tango

| Artistic judges | | | Technical judges | |
| 1 | 2 | 3 | 4 | 5 |
|---|---|---|---|---|
| Thiaguinho | Thiago Fragoso | Deborah Secco | Carlinhos de Jesus | Claudia Motta |

Running order

Salsa
| Couple | Judges' score | | | | | Total score | Studio score | Dance total | Final total | Result |
| Couple | 1 | 2 | 3 | 4 | 5 | Total score | Studio score | Dance total | Final total | Result |
|---|---|---|---|---|---|---|---|---|---|---|
| Marcello & Ana Paula | 10 | 10 | 10 | 9.9 | 9.9 | 49.8 | 9.8 | 59.6 | — | N/A |
| Lucy & Jefferson | 10 | 10 | 10 | 9.8 | 9.9 | 49.7 | 9.7 | 59.4 | — | N/A |
| Rodrigo & Nathália | 10 | 10 | 10 | 10 | 10 | 50.0 | 10 | 60.0 | — | N/A |

Tango
| Couple | Judges' score | | | | | Total score | Studio score | Dance total | Final total | Result |
| Couple | 1 | 2 | 3 | 4 | 5 | Total score | Studio score | Dance total | Final total | Result |
|---|---|---|---|---|---|---|---|---|---|---|
| Marcello & Ana Paula | 10 | 10 | 10 | 10 | 10 | 50.0 | 9.9 | 59.9 | 119.5 | Eliminated |
| Lucy & Jefferson | 10 | 10 | 10 | 10 | 10 | 50.0 | 9.9 | 59.9 | 119.3 | Eliminated |
| Rodrigo & Nathália | 10 | 10 | 10 | 9.9 | 9.9 | 49.8 | 9.9 | 59.7 | 119.7 | Finalist |

=== Week 14 ===
Semifinals 2

- Styles: Salsa & Tango

| Artistic judges | | | Technical judges | |
| 1 | 2 | 3 | 4 | 5 |
|---|---|---|---|---|
| Pabllo Vittar | Juliette Freire | Lázaro Ramos | Carlinhos de Jesus | Claudia Motta |

Running order

Salsa
| Couple | Judges' score | | | | | Total score | Studio score | Dance total | Final total | Result |
| Couple | 1 | 2 | 3 | 4 | 5 | Total score | Studio score | Dance total | Final total | Result |
|---|---|---|---|---|---|---|---|---|---|---|
| Paolla & Leandro | 10 | 10 | 10 | 10 | 10 | 50.0 | 9.9 | 59.9 | — | N/A |
| Tiago & Brennda | 10 | 10 | 10 | 10 | 10 | 50.0 | 9.8 | 59.8 | — | N/A |
| Sophia & Zazá | 10 | 10 | 10 | 9.9 | 9.9 | 49.8 | 9.8 | 59.6 | — | N/A |

Tango
| Couple | Judges' score | | | | | Total score | Studio score | Dance total | Final total | Result |
| Couple | 1 | 2 | 3 | 4 | 5 | Total score | Studio score | Dance total | Final total | Result |
|---|---|---|---|---|---|---|---|---|---|---|
| Paolla & Leandro | 10 | 10 | 10 | 10 | 10 | 50.0 | 10 | 60.0 | 119.9 | Finalist |
| Tiago & Brennda | 10 | 10 | 10 | 9.9 | 10 | 49.9 | 9.9 | 59.8 | 119.6 | Eliminated |
| Sophia & Zazá | 10 | 10 | 10 | 9.9 | 9.9 | 49.8 | 9.9 | 59.7 | 119.3 | Eliminated |

=== Week 15 ===
Semifinals 3

- Styles: Salsa & Tango

| Artistic judges | | | Technical judges | |
| 1 | 2 | 3 | 4 | 5 |
|---|---|---|---|---|
| Luísa Sonza | Fábio Porchat | Lília Cabral | Carlinhos de Jesus | Claudia Motta |

Running order

Salsa
| Couple | Judges' score | | | | | Total score | Studio score | Dance total | Final total | Result |
| Couple | 1 | 2 | 3 | 4 | 5 | Total score | Studio score | Dance total | Final total | Result |
|---|---|---|---|---|---|---|---|---|---|---|
| Maria & Marcus | Did not perform due to an injury | | | | | | | | — | N/A |
| Viviane & Rodrigo | 10 | 10 | 10 | 10 | 10 | 50.0 | 9.8 | 59.8 | — | N/A |
| Dandara & Diego | 10 | 10 | 10 | 10 | 10 | 50.0 | 9.9 | 59.9 | — | N/A |

Tango
| Couple | Judges' score | | | | | Total score | Studio score | Dance total | Final total | Result |
| Couple | 1 | 2 | 3 | 4 | 5 | Total score | Studio score | Dance total | Final total | Result |
|---|---|---|---|---|---|---|---|---|---|---|
| Maria & Marcus | Did not perform due to an injury | | | | | | | | 000.0 | Withdrew |
| Viviane & Rodrigo | 10 | 10 | 10 | 10 | 10 | 50.0 | 9.9 | 59.9 | 119.7 | Eliminated |
| Dandara & Diego | 10 | 10 | 10 | 10 | 10 | 50.0 | 10 | 60.0 | 119.9 | Finalist |

=== Week 16 ===
Finals

- Styles: Waltz & Samba

| Artistic judges | | | Technical judges | |
| 1 | 2 | 3 | 4 | 5 |
|---|---|---|---|---|
| Alexandre Pires | Rebeca Andrade | Ana Maria Braga | Carlinhos de Jesus | Claudia Motta |

Running order

Waltz
| Couple | Judges' score | | | | | Total score | Studio score | Dance total | Final total | Result |
| Couple | 1 | 2 | 3 | 4 | 5 | Total score | Studio score | Dance total | Final total | Result |
|---|---|---|---|---|---|---|---|---|---|---|
| Dandara & Diego | 10 | 9.9 | 10 | 10 | 10 | 49.9 | 9.8 | 59.7 | — | N/A |
| Rodrigo & Nathália | 10 | 10 | 10 | 10 | 10 | 50.0 | 9.8 | 59.8 | — | N/A |
| Paolla & Leandro | 10 | 10 | 10 | 10 | 10 | 50.0 | 9.9 | 59.9 | — | N/A |

Samba
| Couple | Judges' score | | | | | Total score | Studio score | Dance total | Final total | Result |
| Couple | 1 | 2 | 3 | 4 | 5 | Total score | Studio score | Dance total | Final total | Result |
|---|---|---|---|---|---|---|---|---|---|---|
| Dandara & Diego | 10 | 10 | 10 | 10 | 10 | 50.0 | 9.9 | 59.9 | 119.6 | Third place |
| Rodrigo & Nathália | 10 | 10 | 10 | 10 | 10 | 50.0 | 9.9 | 59.9 | 119.7 | Runner-up |
| Paolla & Leandro | 10 | 10 | 10 | 10 | 10 | 50.0 | 9.9 | 59.9 | 119.8 | Winner |

== Ratings and reception ==
=== Brazilian ratings ===
All numbers are in points and provided by Kantar Ibope Media.

| Episode | Title | Air date | Timeslot (BRT) | SP viewers (in points) | Source |
|---|---|---|---|---|---|
| 1 | Qualifiers 1 | May 16, 2021 | Sunday 6:00 p.m. | 19.3 | |
| 2 | Qualifiers 2 | May 23, 2021 | Sunday 6:00 p.m. | 21.4 | |
| 3 | Qualifiers 3 | May 30, 2021 | Sunday 6:00 p.m. | 16.8 | |
| 4 | Qualifiers 4 | June 6, 2021 | Sunday 6:00 p.m. | 15.7 | |
| 5 | Qualifiers 5 | June 13, 2021 | Sunday 6:00 p.m. | 17.0 | |
| 6 | Qualifiers 6 | June 20, 2021 | Sunday 6:00 p.m. | 16.7 | |
| 7 | Dance-offs 1 | June 27, 2021 | Sunday 6:00 p.m. | 15.8 | |
| 8 | Dance-offs 2 | July 4, 2021 | Sunday 6:00 p.m. | 17.4 | |
| 9 | Dance-offs 3 | July 11, 2021 | Sunday 6:00 p.m. | 18.9 | |
| 10 | Quarterfinals 1 | July 18, 2021 | Sunday 6:00 p.m. | 13.9 | |
| 11 | Quarterfinals 2 | July 25, 2021 | Sunday 6:00 p.m. | 16.1 | |
| 12 | Quarterfinals 3 | August 1, 2021 | Sunday 6:00 p.m. | 17.3 | |
| 13 | Semifinals 1 | August 8, 2021 | Sunday 6:00 p.m. | 15.1 | |
| 14 | Semifinals 2 | August 15, 2021 | Sunday 6:00 p.m. | 17.6 | |
| 15 | Semifinals 3 | August 22, 2021 | Sunday 6:00 p.m. | 16.8 | |
| 16 | Finals | August 29, 2021 | Sunday 6:00 p.m. | 20.0 | |

- In 2021, each point represents 268.278 households in 15 market cities in Brazil (76.577 households in São Paulo).
