= A Fazenda 5 =

Season of television series

- Season 5
- Hosted by: Britto Júnior
- No. of days: 93
- No. of contestants: 16
- Winner: Viviane Araújo
- Runner-up: Felipe Folgosi
- Companion show: A Fazenda Online
- No. of episodes: 90

Release
- Original network: RecordTV
- Original release: May 29 – August 29, 2012

Series chronology
- ← Previous; A Fazenda 4 Next → A Fazenda 6

A Fazenda 5 was the fifth season of the Brazilian reality television series A Fazenda, which premiered on Tuesday, May 29, 2012, on RecordTV. It was hosted by Britto Júnior and reports by Chris Couto and Celso Cavallini.

The season was officially confirmed since 2011 as part of a millionaire contract between Strix Television and Record, which guaranteed seasons until 2019.

Britto Junior and Chris Couto reprised their hosting stints for the show. Celso Cavallini made his debut as the show's new reporter.

The grand prize was of R$ 2 million without tax allowances. with a brand new car offered to the runner-up.

On August 29, 2012, 37-year-old actress Viviane Araújo won the competition with 84% of the public vote over actor Felipe Folgosi and drag queen Léo Áquila.

== Production ==
=== Overview ===
Pre-production started in January 2012. At first, the fifth season was scheduled to premiere early April but was postponed to mid June since the producers believed that launching the new season right after the finale of Big Brother Brasil 12 could hurt the show due to the similarities in both formats.

On May 9, 2012, it was announced that the season would premiere May 30, 2012 in order to make way for the 2012 Summer Olympics and to avoid clashing with Globo's new 11 pm soap opera Gabriela. On 15 May, it was announced that the premiere was anticipated to May 29, 2012.

== Contestants ==
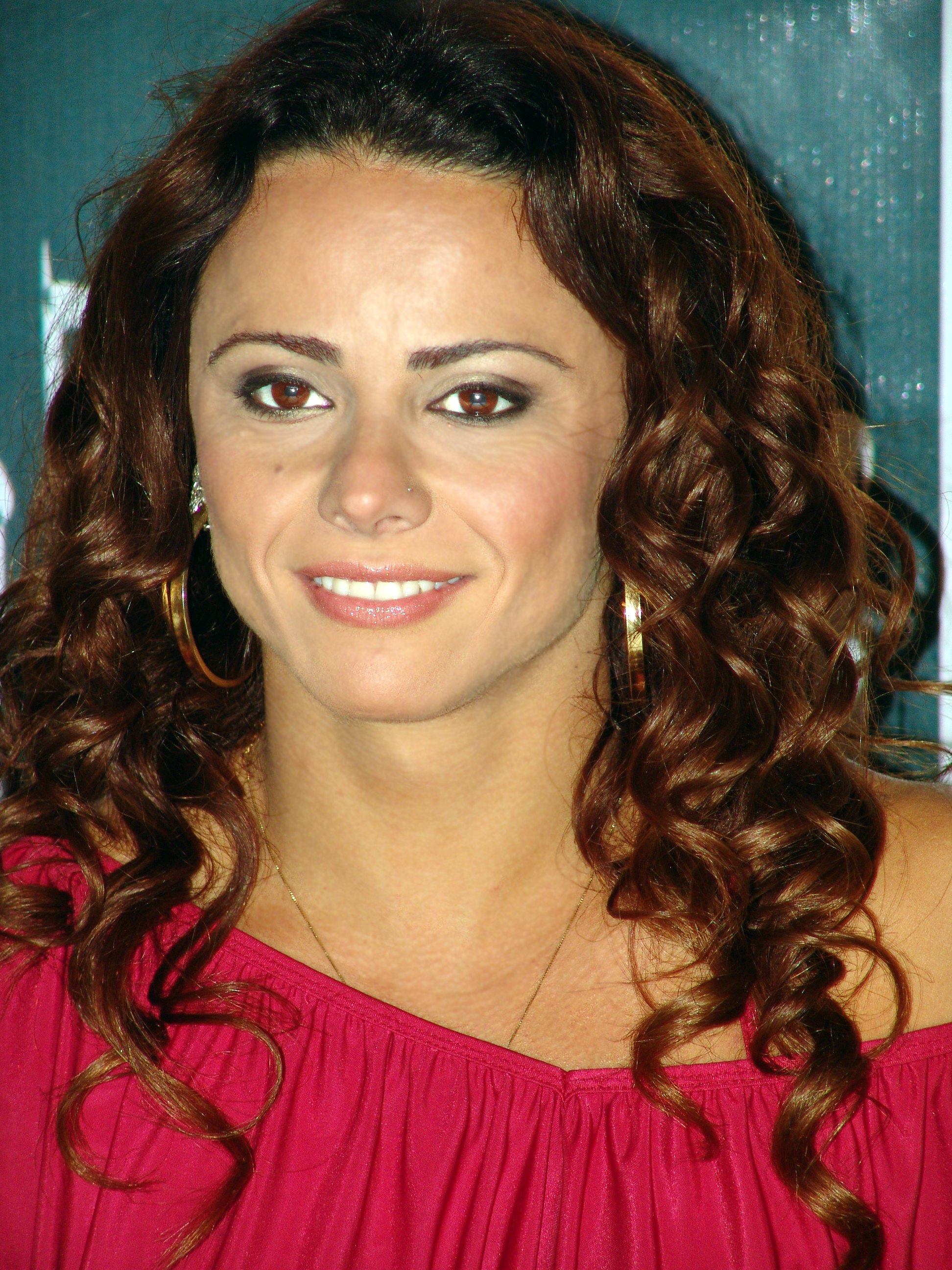
Viviane Araújo, winner of the fifth season.

The complete cast list was leaked 24 hours before the season premiere. Biographical information according to Record official series site, plus footnoted additions.
(ages stated are at time of contest)

Contestant	Age	Background	Hometown	Status	Finish
Lui Mendes	41	Actor	Rio de Janeiro	Eliminated 1st on June 7, 2012	16th
Gustavo Salyer	36	Model	Rio de Janeiro	Eliminated 2nd on June 14, 2012	15th
Sylvinho Blau-Blau	47	Singer	Rio de Janeiro	Eliminated 3rd on June 21, 2012	14th
Shayene Cesário	25	Carnival star	Rio de Janeiro	Eliminated 4th on June 28, 2012	13th
Rodrigo Capella	30	Comedian	Rio de Janeiro	Eliminated 5th on July 5, 2012	12th
Gretchen	53	Singer	Rio de Janeiro	Walked on July 7, 2012	11th
Angela Bismarchi	45	Media personality	Rio de Janeiro	Eliminated 6th on July 19, 2012	10th
Diego Pombo	25	Football referee	Salvador	Eliminated 7th on July 26, 2012	9th
Penélope Nova	38	TV Host	Salvador	Eliminated 8th on August 2, 2012	8th
Vavá	38	Musician	Santos	Eliminated 9th on August 9, 2012	7th
Simone Sampaio	34	Dancer	São Paulo	Eliminated 10th on August 16, 2012	6th
Robertha Portella	26	Dancer	Rio de Janeiro	Eliminated 11th on August 23, 2012	5th
Nicole Bahls	26	Model	Londrina	Eliminated 12th on August 26, 2012	4th
Léo Áquila	42	Drag queen	Teófilo Otoni	Third place on August 29, 2012	3rd
Felipe Folgosi	38	Actor	São Paulo	Runner-up on August 29, 2012	2nd
Viviane Araújo	37	Actress	Rio de Janeiro	Winner on August 29, 2012	1st

== Future appearances ==
In 2015, Viviane Araújo appeared in Dança dos Famosos 12, she won the competition, in 2021 Araújo returned on Dança dos Famosos 18, in a all stars season, she finished in 4th place in the competition.

In 2016, Gretchen appeared with her husband Carlos Marques in Power Couple Brasil 1, they finished in 5th place in the competition, in 2022, Gretchen appeared as a Rosa (Rose) in The Masked Singer Brasil 2, she joined Group A and sang only one song before her unmasking at the first episode, placing last at 16th in the competition.

In 2017, Sylvinho Blau-Blau appeared with his wife Ana Paula Pereira in Power Couple Brasil 2, they finished in 6th place in the competition, in 2023, Sylvinho Blau-Blau appeared in a trio called Os Suculentos (The Succulents), along with Patricia Marx and Rosana in The Masked Singer Brasil 3, they joined Group A and sang four songs before their unmasking at the sixth episode, placing 9th in the competition.

In 2017, Nicole Bahls returned to compete in A Fazenda 9, she finished in 16th place in the competition, in 2019, Bahls appeared with her husband Marcelo Bimbi in Power Couple Brasil 4, they originally finished in 8th place, however they comeback to the game and finished as winners from the competition.

In 2018, Rodrigo Capella appeared in Dancing Brasil 3, he finished in 4th place in the competition.

== Format ==
The format changed from previous seasons. Celebrities contestants were incarcerated in the Farm with no contact to and from the outside world. Each week, the contestants took part in several compulsory challenges that determined who would win power in the Farm. The Farmer of the Week is immune from nominations.

=== Key Power ===
Starting on week 2, the contestants compete to win the Key Power. The Key Power holder is the only contestant who can open the mystery box located at the Farm. However, opening the box will unleash a good consequence or a bad consequence at the nomination process. The Key Holder's choice is in bold.

Results

Week	Key Holder	Sent to the Barn	Consequences
2	Felipe	Léo, Nicole, Robertha, Rodrigo, Shayene, Vavá (all immune)	Felipe had 2 options: win immunity.; **mystery prize**. (R$30.000)
3	Felipe	Léo, Rodrigo, Sylvinho, Vavá	Felipe had 2 options: **nominate someone from the barn**. (Sylvinho); cancel the eviction.
4	Vavá	Angela, Diego, Viviane	Vava had no options, only 2 instructions.: won immunity.; banned 2 from the barn from nominate. (Diego, Viviane)
5	Rodrigo	Angela, Gretchen, Nicole, Viviane (This week the contestants who were sent to the barn were defined by a challenge, not by Rodrigo's choice.)	Rodrigo had no options, only 1 instruction.: save one of three nominees, thus chose the next Farmer (**Vavá**, Simone, Rodrigo).
6	Felipe	Nicole, Penelope, Robertha, Simone	Felipe had 2 options: **cancel the eviction**.; allow a new contestant to enter the Farm.
7	Penelope	Angela, Léo, Vavá	Penelope had no options, only 2 instructions.: qualified for a challenge worth a Nissan and choose 4 to compete.; nominate someone from the barn. (Angela)
8	Viviane	Diego, Felipe, Nicole, Penelope	Viviane had no options, only 2 instructions.: banned 3 from compete in a challenge worth a Nissan.; change 1 nominee with someone from the House. (Robertha → Léo)
9	Simone	Nicole, Penelope, Vavá	Simone had 2 options: win immunity and give R$10.000 for each contestant in the barn.; **win R$30.000, but remain eligible to be nominated**.
10	Felipe	Léo, Simone	Felipe had 2 instructions.: nominate someone from the barn. (Léo); banned 1 from compete in next Key challenge. (Viviane)
11	Felipe	Léo, Nicole, Robertha, Viviane	Felipe had 2 instructions.: nominate someone from the main House. (Simone); choose 3 from the barn to compete in a challenge worth a Nissan.
12	Viviane	(none)	Viviane had 2 options: nominate everybody left in the farm and win immunity.; **nominate herself (with 2 others) and compete to be a finalist**.

=== Guest ===
On day 20, production pitched a catch for the participants with help of Théo Becker, one of the most controversial housemates from A Fazenda seasons. Théo acted as if he was a new contestant, but at the end of day 21, he revealed that it was a joke and left the farm.

== Voting history ==
	Week 1	Week 2	Week 3	Week 4	Week 5	Week 6	Week 7	Week 8	Week 9	Week 10	Week 11	Week 12	Week 13	
	Week 1	Week 2	Week 3	Week 4	Week 5	Week 6	Week 7	Week 8	Week 9	Week 10	Week 11	Week 12	Day 90	Finale
Farmer of the Week	(none)	Sylvinho	Diego	Nicole	Robertha	Vavá	Diego	Simone	Léo	Robertha	Léo	Nicole	(none)	
Nominated (Farmer)	(none)	Gustavo	Felipe	Robertha	Vavá	Robertha	Simone	Diego	Penelope	Nicole	Felipe	(none)	(none)	
Nominated (House)	Lui	Diego	Nicole	Shayene	Simone	Viviane	Viviane	Vavá	Nicole	Vava	Nicole	(none)	(none)	
Nominated (Twist)	Viviane	Simone	Sylvinho	Felipe	Rodrigo	Diego	Angela	Léo	Robertha	Léo	Simone	(none)	(none)	
Viviane	Banned	Diego	Nicole	Banned	Exempt	Nicole	Nicole	Nicole	Nicole	Vavá	Nicole	Nominee	Nominee	Winner (Day 93)
Felipe	Lui	Diego	Sylvinho	Diego	Diego	Diego	Vavá	Vavá	Vavá	Vavá	Robertha	Saved	Saved	Runner-up (Day 93)
Léo	Lui	Diego	Nicole	Gretchen	Felipe	Diego	Felipe	Nicole	Nicole	Felipe	Farmer of the Week	Nominee	Immune	Third place (Day 93)
Nicole	Viviane	Simone	Shayene	Shayene	Exempt	Viviane	Viviane	Léo	Robertha	Viviane	Robertha	Farmer of the Week	Nominee	Evicted (Day 90)
Robertha	Sylvinho	Viviane	Nicole	Gretchen	Farmer of the Week	Nicole	Vavá	Vavá	Nicole	Farmer of the Week	Nicole	Nominee	Evicted (Day 87)	
Simone	Sylvinho	Diego	Nicole	Shayene	Diego	Penelope	Nicole	Vavá	Vavá	Vavá	Nicole	Evicted (Day 80)		
Vavá	Lui	Gretchen	Shayene	Gretchen	Simone	Viviane	Felipe	Robertha	Simone	Viviane	Evicted (Day 73)			
Penelope	Lui	Diego	Shayene	Shayene	Simone	Viviane	Viviane	Robertha	Simone	Evicted (Day 66)				
Diego	Viviane	Angela	Farmer of the Week	Banned	Simone	Léo	Viviane	Léo	Evicted (Day 59)					
Angela	Lui	Diego	Rodrigo	Penelope	Exempt	Penelope	Penelope	Evicted (Day 52)						
Gretchen	Lui	Diego	Rodrigo	Penelope	Exempt	Walked (Day 40)								
Rodrigo	Lui	Angela	Nicole	Shayene	Simone	Evicted (Day 38)								
Shayene	Lui	Felipe	Rodrigo	Diego	Evicted (Day 31)									
Sylvinho	Banned	Farmer of the Week	Simone	Evicted (Day 24)										
Gustavo	Lui	Angela	Evicted (Day 17)											
Lui	Banned	Evicted (Day 10)												
Notes	1, 2, 3	4, 5, 6	7	8, 9	10, 11, 12	13, 14, 15	16, 17, 18	19, 20, 21	22, 23, 24	25	26	27	28, 29, 30	(none)
Up for Nomination	Lui; Sylvinho; Viviane	Diego; Gustavo; Simone	Felipe; Nicole; Sylvinho	Robertha; Shayene; Felipe	Vavá; Simone; Rodrigo	Robertha; Viviane; Diego	Angela; Simone; Viviane	Diego; Vava; Léo	Penelope; Nicole; Robertha	Léo; Nicole; Vavá	Simone; Felipe; Nicole	Léo; Robertha; Viviane	Felipe; Nicole; Viviane	(none)
Saved	Sylvinho	Diego	Nicole	Robertha	Vavá	(none)	Simone	Léo	Robertha	Léo	Nicole	Léo	Felipe	(none)
Nominated for Eviction	Lui; Viviane	Gustavo; Simone	Felipe; Sylvinho	Felipe; Shayene	Rodrigo; Simone	(none)	Angela; Viviane	Diego; Vavá	Nicole; Penelope	Nicole; Vavá	Felipe; Simone	Robertha; Viviane	Nicole; Viviane	Felipe; Léo; Viviane
Walked	(none)					Gretchen	(none)							
Evicted	Lui; 91% to evict	Gustavo; 69% to evict	Sylvinho; 81% to evict	Shayene; 61% to evict	Rodrigo; 62% to evict	Eviction cancelled	Angela; 87% to evict	Diego; 54% to evict	Penelope; 68% to evict	Vavá; 50.41% to evict	Simone; 74% to evict	Robertha; 84% to evict	Nicole; 69% to evict	Léo; Fewest votes to win
Evicted	Lui; 91% to evict	Gustavo; 69% to evict	Sylvinho; 81% to evict	Shayene; 61% to evict	Rodrigo; 62% to evict	Eviction cancelled	Angela; 87% to evict	Diego; 54% to evict	Penelope; 68% to evict	Vavá; 50.41% to evict	Simone; 74% to evict	Robertha; 84% to evict	Nicole; 69% to evict	Felipe; Fewest votes to win
Evicted	Lui; 91% to evict	Gustavo; 69% to evict	Sylvinho; 81% to evict	Shayene; 61% to evict	Rodrigo; 62% to evict	Eviction cancelled	Angela; 87% to evict	Diego; 54% to evict	Penelope; 68% to evict	Vavá; 50.41% to evict	Simone; 74% to evict	Robertha; 84% to evict	Nicole; 69% to evict	Viviane; 84% to win

=== Notes ===
- ^Note 1: As they did not achieve contestant status by successfully completing a challenge at the launch night, Gretchen, Gustavo, Lui, Penelope, Sylvinho and Viviane were banished to the barn, where they would live until the first eviction.
- ^Note 2: The six in the barn competed in 3 challenges in order to achieve contestant status. Gretchen won the 1st and left the barn on day 3. Lui won the 2nd and left the barn on day 4, but after a production verification, he was disqualified for cheating, so runner-up Penelope join the main house instead. On day 6, Gustavo won the 3rd challenge and left the barn, leaving Lui, Sylvinho and Viviane as the last remaining.
- ^Note 3: The 13 in the main house should choose the 1st nominee between the 3 that were left over at the barn. Lui received the most nominations with 9, so he was the 1st nominee. Sylvinho and Viviane competed in the last challenge for a place in the main house. Sylvinho won the challenge, so Viviane became the 2nd nominee by default.
- ^Note 4: Following Lui's eviction on day 10, host Britto Junior revealed only to the public that the first Farmer of the Week would be Lui's choice. Lui choose Sylvinho. On the following day, the contestants were only informed that Sylvinho was the first Farmer, but not how the choice was made.
- ^Note 5: Key Power holder Felipe opened the mystery box, which revealed that all contestants in the barn (Léo, Nicole, Robertha, Rodrigo, Shayene and Vava) were immune. Felipe could also choose win immunity or a mystery prize. He chose the mystery prize, which was R$30.000.
- ^Note 6: The seven remaining eligible contestants (Angela, Felipe, Gretchen, Penelope, Simone and Viviane) were asked to save one contestant. The second nominee Diego was asked to start and he saved Penelope, who saved Viviane, who saved Gretchen, who saved Felipe, who saved Angela, leaving Simone as the 3rd nominee.
- ^Note 7: Key Power holder Felipe could choose automatically nominate someone from the barn (Léo, Rodrigo, Sylvinho and Vava) or void the nominations and cancel the eviction. He choose automatically nominate Sylvinho, who joined him and Nicole as this week's nominees.
- ^Note 8: Gretchen and Shayene received the most nominations with three each. Nicole, as Farmer of the Week, had the casting vote and choose Shayene to be the 2nd nominee.
- ^Note 9: The nine remaining eligible contestants (Angela, Diego, Felipe, Gretchen, Léo, Penelope, Rodrigo, Simone and Viviane) were asked to save one contestant. The 2nd nominee Shayene was asked to start and she saved Gretchen, who saved Viviane, who saved Angela, who saved Léo, who saved Simone, who saved Rodrigo, who saved Penelope, who saved Diego, leaving Felipe as the 3rd nominee.
- ^Note 10: Key Power holder Rodrigo opened the mystery box, which contained two envelopes. The first envelope was opened before the vote started and revealed that the four contestants in the barn (Angela, Gretchen, Nicole and Viviane) were exempt.
- ^Note 11: The 6 remaining eligible contestants (Diego, Felipe, Léo, Penelope, Rodrigo and Simone) were asked to save one contestant. The 2nd nominee Simone was asked to start and she saved Felipe, who saved Léo, who saved Diego, who saved Penelope, leaving Rodrigo as the 3rd nominee.
- ^Note 12: Key Power holder Rodrigo opened the second envelope which revealed that he would save one nominee, thus choose the next Farmer of the Week. Although he could save himself, he chose Vava to be next Farmer, so he and Simone were this week's nominees.
- ^Note 13: Diego, Nicole, Penelope and Viviane received the most nominations with 2 each. Vava, as Farmer of the Week, had the casting vote and choose Viviane to be the second nominee.
- ^Note 14: The seven remaining eligible contestants (Angela, Diego, Felipe, Léo, Nicole, Penelope and Simone) were asked to save one contestant. The 2nd nominee Viviane was asked to start and she saved Angela, who saved Simone, who saved Léo, who saved Felipe, who saved Penelope, who saved Nicole, leaving Diego as the 3rd nominee.
- ^Note 15: Key Power holder Felipe could choose void the nominations and cancel the eviction or allow a new contestant to enter the Farm as Gretchen's replacement. He choose to cancel the eviction.
- ^Note 16: As result of Felipe's decision to cancel the eviction, last week's nominees Diego, Robertha and Viviane competed to be the Farmer of Week, where Robertha won it.
- ^Note 17: Key Power holder Penelope could choose automatically nominate someone from the barn (Angela, Léo and Vava) and she chose Angela.
- ^Note 18: Felipe, Nicole, Vava and Viviane received the most nominations with two each. Diego, as Farmer of the Week, had the casting vote and choose Viviane to be the third nominee.
- ^Note 19: Léo, Nicole, Robertha and Vava received the most nominations with 2 each. Simone, as Farmer of the Week, had the casting vote and choose Vava to be the 2nd nominee.
- ^Note 20: The six remaining eligible contestants (Felipe, Léo, Nicole, Penelope, Robertha and Viviane) were asked to save one contestant. The 2nd nominee Vava was asked to start and he saved Penelope, who saved Nicole, who saved Felipe, who saved Viviane, who saved Léo, leaving Robertha as the 3rd nominee.
- ^Note 21: Key Power holder Viviane was asked to replace one nominee (Diego, Vava or Robertha) with someone from the main house. Since Léo was the only one eligible, he was automatically nominated by default. Then, Viviane choose to save Robertha.
- ^Note 22: Key Power holder Simone could choose win immunity and give R$10.000 for each contestant in the barn (Nicole, Penelope and Vava) or win R$30,000, but remain eligible to be nominated. She chose to take the money.
- ^Note 23: Nicole, Simone and Vava received the most nominations with two each. Léo, as Farmer of the Week, had the casting vote and choose Nicole to be the 2nd nominee.
- ^Note 24: The 5 remaining eligible contestants (Felipe, Robertha, Simone, Vava and Viviane) were asked to save one contestant. The 2nd nominee Nicole was asked to start and she saved Vava, who saved Felipe, who saved Simone, who saved Viviane, leaving Robertha as the 3rd nominee.
- ^Note 25: Key Power holder Felipe had to choose between the two contestants in the barn (Léo or Simone), one to be automatically nominated and other to win an extra immunity. Felipe nominated Léo, so Simone won the immunity. Later, Felipe was asked to banned 1 contestant who wasn't nominated from next week's Key challenge. He banned Viviane.
- ^Note 26: Key Power holder Felipe had to choose between the 2 contestants in the main House (Himself or Simone), one to be automatically nominated. Felipe choose Simone as the 1st nominee.
- ^Note 27: Key Power holder Viviane had to choose the 3 nominees between the 4 eligible contestants (Felipe, Léo, Robertha and Herself). The next day, the three nominees would compete in a challenge for a place in the final. Viviane choose to be nominated along with Léo and Robertha, which allowed her to compete for first spot in the finale. However, Léo won the challenge and secured himself a place in the final three, so Robertha and Viviane were nominated for eviction by default.
- ^Note 28: Following Robertha's eviction on day 88, Felipe, Nicole and Viviane were automatically up for nomination as Léo already secured the first spot in the final.
- ^Note 29: Felipe won the final challenge and secured the second spot in the final, so Nicole and Viviane were nominated for the final eviction by default.
- ^Note 30: Following Nicole's eviction on day 91, Viviane became the last finalist of the season. For the final, the public votes for the contestant they want to win.

== Ratings and reception ==
=== Brazilian ratings ===
All numbers are in points and provided by Kantar Ibope Media.

Week	First air date	Last air date	Timeslot (BRT)	Daily SP viewers (in points)							SP viewers (in points)	Source
Week	First air date	Last air date	Timeslot (BRT)	Mon	Tue	Wed	Thu	Fri	Sat	Sun	SP viewers (in points)	Source
1	May 29, 2012	June 3, 2012	Everyday; 10:30 p.m.	—	17	12	11	13	11	11	12.5	
2	June 4, 2012	June 10, 2012	Everyday; 10:30 p.m.	08	11	14	10	11	11	10	10.7	
3	June 11, 2012	June 17, 2012	Everyday; 10:30 p.m.	07	07	11	09	11	13	12	10.0	
4	June 18, 2012	June 24, 2012	Everyday; 10:30 p.m.	12	12	09	12	12	12	11	11.4	
5	June 25, 2012	July 1, 2012	Everyday; 10:30 p.m.	12	12	08	10	10	10	10	10.3	
6	July 2, 2012	July 8, 2012	Everyday; 10:30 p.m.	11	12	07	11	12	12	13	10.7	
7	July 9, 2012	July 15, 2012	Everyday; 10:30 p.m.	10	11	10	12	09	12	11	10.7	
8	July 16, 2012	July 22, 2012	Everyday; 10:30 p.m.	10	13	11	10	10	09	09	10.3	
9	July 23, 2012	July 29, 2012	Everyday; 10:30 p.m.	10	13	11	10	10	06	08	09.7	
10	July 30, 2012	August 5, 2012	Everyday; 10:30 p.m.	11	11	13	12	09	08	08	10.3	
11	August 6, 2012	August 12, 2012	Everyday; 10:30 p.m.	09	12	14	10	10	09	07	10.1	
12	August 13, 2012	August 19, 2012	Everyday; 10:30 p.m.	09	12	13	11	10	09	09	10.4	
13	August 20, 2012	August 26, 2012	Everyday; 10:30 p.m.	11	14	13	11	10	11	10	11.4	
14	August 27, 2012	August 29, 2012	Everyday; 10:30 p.m.	10	10	13	18	—	—	—	13.7	
