= Dança dos Famosos season 17 =

Dança dos Famosos
- Season 17
- Celebrity winner: Lucy Ramos
- Professional winner: Reginaldo Sama
- No. of episodes: 13

Release
- Original network: TV Globo
- Original release: 20 September – 20 December 2020

Season chronology
- ← Previous; Season 16 Next → Season 18

Dança dos Famosos 2020 was the seventeenth season of the Brazilian reality television show Dança dos Famosos which premiered on 20 September 2020 at 7:00 / 6:00 p.m. (BRT / AMT) on TV Globo. Due to the COVID-19 pandemic, it has been confirmed that the season would be slightly shorter than planned.

On 20 December 2020, actress Lucy Ramos & Reginaldo Sama (who replaced Léo Santos) won the competition over actress Danielle Winits & Fernando Schellenberg and actress Giullia Buscacio & Danniel Navarro, who took 2nd and 3rd place respectively. It was the first season to featured an all female final three finale.

Lucy is the show's first female afro-Brazilian celebrity champion (and third afro-Brazilian celebrity champion overall following season 3's Robson Caetano and season 11's Marcello Melo Jr.) and the first celebrity champion who had to switch partners over the course of the season.

== Couples ==
The first celebrities (Bruno, Danielle, Giullia, Henri, Isabelli and Zé Roberto) were announced on 30 August. On 6 September, the final celebrities (André, Felipe, Guta, Lucy, Luiza and Marcelo) were also revealed. The full lineup of professionals and couples were unveiled on 13 September. It was also announced that Henri Castelli had withdrawn from competing due to undisclosed reasons. On 20 September, Juliano Laham was revealed as his replacement.

Celebrity	Notability (known for)	Professional	Status	Ref.
Juliano Laham	Actor	Nathalia Zannin	Withdrew on 11 October 2020	
Danielle Winits Returned on 8 November	Actress	Fernando Schellenberg	Withdrew on 18 October 2020	
Guta Stresser Returned on 8 November	Actress	Marcus Lobo	Eliminated 1st on 1 November 2020	
Isabeli Fontana Returned on 8 November	Model	Igor Maximiliano	Eliminated 2nd on 1 November 2020	
Zé Roberto	Former football player	Larissa Lannes	Withdrew on 8 November 2020	
Felipe Titto	Actor & TV host	Brennda Martins	Withdrew on 8 November 2020	
Bruno Belutti	Singer	Bruna Santos	Withdrew on 13 December 2020	
Isabeli Fontana	Model	Igor Maximiliano	Eliminated 3rd on 13 December 2020	
Guta Stresser	Actress	Jefferson Bilisco; Marcus Lobo (week 1–7)	Eliminated 4th on 13 December 2020	
Marcelo Serrado	Actor	Beatriz Larrat	Eliminated 5th on 13 December 2020	
André Gonçalves	Actor	Paula Santos	Eliminated 6th on 13 December 2020	
Luiza Possi	Singer	Daniel Norton	Eliminated 7th on 13 December 2020	
Giullia Buscacio	Actress	Danniel Navarro	Third place on 20 December 2020	
Danielle Winits	Actress	Fernando Schellenberg	Runner-up on 20 December 2020	
Lucy Ramos	Actress	Reginaldo Sama; Léo Santos (week 1–9)	Winner on 20 December 2020	

== Elimination chart ==
Couple	Place	1	2	3	4	5	6	7	8	9	10	11	12	9+12	13
Lucy & Reginaldo	1	48.8	—N/a	49.1	—N/a	49.6	—N/a	49.6	—N/a	49.5	—N/a	—N/a	50.0	99.5	99.8
Danielle & Fernando	2	48.7	—N/a	49.5	—N/a	—			—	—N/a	50.0	49.9	—N/a	99.9	100
Giullia & Danniel	3	48.3	—N/a	49.3	—N/a	49.6	—N/a	49.7	—N/a	49.6	—N/a	—N/a	49.9	99.5	99.8
Luiza & Daniel	4	48.8	—N/a	49.2	—N/a	49.4	—N/a	49.6	—N/a	49.5	—N/a	49.7	—N/a	99.2	
André & Paula	5	—N/a	48.8	—N/a	49.6	—N/a	49.7	—N/a	49.7	—N/a	49.7	—N/a	49.5	99.2	
Marcelo & Beatriz	6	—N/a	49.0	—N/a	49.3	—N/a	49.4	—N/a	49.4	49.6	—N/a	—N/a	49.3	98.9	
Guta & Jefferson	7	48.1	—N/a	48.5	—N/a	48.9	—N/a	49.0	—	—N/a	49.4	49.2	—N/a	98.6	
Isabeli & Igor	8	48.3	—N/a	48.7	—N/a	49.2	—N/a	49.1	—	—N/a	49.4	—N/a	49.0	98.4	
Belutti & Bruna	9	—N/a	48.8	—N/a	49.1	—N/a	49.3	—N/a	49.5	49.6	—N/a	—N/a	—		
Felipe & Brennda	10	—N/a	49.4	—N/a	49.1	—N/a	49.5	—N/a	—						
Zé Roberto & Larissa	11	—N/a	48.3	—N/a	49.0	—N/a	49.5	—N/a	—						
Juliano & Nathalia	12	—N/a	48.8	—N/a	—										

Lowest score
Highest score
Returned
Saved last
Eliminated
Withdrew

Winner
Runner-up
Third place

== Weekly results ==
=== Week 1 ===
Week 1 – Women

- Style: Disco

Artistic judges			Technical judges	
1	2	3	4	5
Marina Ruy Barbosa	Tom Cavalcante	Negra Li	Anselmo Zolla	Ju Valcézia

Running order

Couple	Judges' score					Total score	Studio score	Week total	Final total	Result
Couple	1	2	3	4	5	Total score	Studio score	Week total	Final total	Result
Danielle & Fernando	10	10	10	9.3	9.4	48.7	9.7	—	58.4	3rd
Giullia & Danniel	10	10	10	9.2	9.1	48.3	9.7	—	58.0	4th
Isabeli & Igor	10	10	10	9.1	9.2	48.3	9.6	—	57.9	5th
Guta & Marcus	10	10	10	9.0	9.1	48.1	9.4	—	57.5	6th
Luiza & Daniel	10	10	10	9.4	9.4	48.8	9.7	—	58.5	2nd
Lucy & Léo	10	10	10	9.4	9.4	48.8	9.8	—	58.6	1st

=== Week 2 ===
Week 1 – Men

- Style: Disco

Artistic judges			Technical judges	
1	2	3	4	5
Luciana Mello	Caio Ribeiro	Emanuelle Araújo	Anselmo Zolla	Ju Valcézia

Running order

Couple	Judges' score					Total score	Studio score	Week total	Final total	Result
Couple	1	2	3	4	5	Total score	Studio score	Week total	Final total	Result
Marcelo & Beatriz	9.9	10	9.9	9.5	9.7	49.0	9.7	—	58.7	2nd
Juliano & Nathalia	10	10	10	9.4	9.4	48.8	9.8	—	58.6	3rd
Zé Roberto & Larissa	9.8	10	9.9	9.3	9.3	48.3	9.8	—	58.1	6th
André & Paula	10	10	10	9.3	9.5	48.8	9.8	—	58.6	3rd
Belutti & Bruna	9.9	10	9.9	9.4	9.6	48.8	9.7	—	58.5	5th
Felipe & Brennda	10	10	10	9.5	9.9	49.4	9.8	—	59.2	1st

=== Week 3 ===
Week 2 – Women

- Style: Forró

Artistic judges			Technical judges	
1	2	3	4	5
Tato	Cléber Machado	Cleo	Raquel Guarini	Inês Bogéa

Running order

Couple	Judges' score					Total score	Studio score	Week total	Final total	Result
Couple	1	2	3	4	5	Total score	Studio score	Week total	Final total	Result
Luiza & Daniel	10	9.8	10	9.7	9.7	49.2	9.7	58.9	117.4	3rd
Lucy & Léo	10	9.8	10	9.7	9.6	49.1	9.9	59.0	117.6	2nd
Guta & Marcus	10	9.7	10	9.4	9.4	48.5	9.6	58.1	115.6	6th
Isabeli & Igor	10	9.8	10	9.4	9.5	48.7	9.7	58.4	116.3	5th
Giullia & Danniel	10	9.9	10	9.7	9.7	49.3	9.9	59.2	117.2	4th
Danielle & Fernando	10	9.9	10	9.8	9.8	49.5	10	59.5	117.9	1st

=== Week 4 ===
Week 2 – Men

- Style: Forró

Artistic judges			Technical judges	
1	2	3	4	5
Thiago Pereira	Anne Lottermann	Luciano	Raquel Guarini	Inês Bogéa

Running order

Couple	Judges' score					Total score	Studio score	Week total	Final total	Result
Couple	1	2	3	4	5	Total score	Studio score	Week total	Final total	Result
Juliano & Nathalia	Did not perform due to a medical emergency							00.0	058.6	Withdrew
Felipe & Brennda	9.9	10	9.9	9.6	9.7	49.1	9.8	58.9	118.1	1st
Belutti & Bruna	9.9	9.8	10	9.7	9.7	49.1	9.8	58.9	117.4	4th
André & Paula	10	10	10	9.8	9.8	49.6	9.8	59.4	118.0	2nd
Zé Roberto & Larissa	9.9	9.9	10	9.6	9.6	49.0	9.8	58.8	116.9	5th
Marcelo & Beatriz	10	10	10	9.7	9.6	49.3	9.8	59.1	117.8	3rd

=== Week 5 ===
Week 3 – Women

- Style: Funk

Artistic judges			Technical judges	
1	2	3	4	5
Carol Ribeiro	Léo Santana	Bárbara Paz	Octávio Nassur	Tainá Grando

Running order

Couple	Judges' score					Total score	Studio score	Week total	Final total	Result
Couple	1	2	3	4	5	Total score	Studio score	Week total	Final total	Result
Danielle & Fernando	Did not perform due to an ankle injury							00.0	117.9	~~Withdrew~~ Dance-off
Lucy & Léo	10	10	10	9.8	9.8	49.6	9.8	59.4	177.0	1st
Isabeli & Igor	10	9.9	9.9	9.7	9.7	49.2	9.7	58.9	175.2	4th
Luiza & Daniel	10	10	10	9.7	9.7	49.4	9.9	59.3	176.7	3rd
Guta & Marcus	9.9	9.8	10	9.6	9.6	48.9	9.7	58.6	174.2	5th
Giullia & Danniel	10	10	10	9.8	9.8	49.6	10	59.6	176.8	2nd

=== Week 6 ===
Week 3 – Men

- Style: Funk

Artistic judges			Technical judges	
1	2	3	4	5
Monique Alfradique	Fábio Porchat	Fernanda Abreu	Octávio Nassur	Tainá Grando

Running order

Couple	Judges' score					Total score	Studio score	Week total	Final total	Result
Couple	1	2	3	4	5	Total score	Studio score	Week total	Final total	Result
André & Paula	10	10	10	9.8	9.9	49.7	9.8	59.5	177.5	1st
Zé Roberto & Larissa	10	10	10	9.8	9.7	49.5	9.8	59.3	176.2	5th
Felipe & Brennda	10	10	10	9.7	9.8	49.5	9.8	59.3	177.4	2nd
Marcelo & Beatriz	10	10	10	9.7	9.7	49.4	9.8	59.2	177.0	3rd
Belutti & Bruna	10	10	10	9.6	9.7	49.3	9.9	59.2	176.6	4th

=== Week 7 ===
Week 4 – Women

- Style: Rock

Artistic judges			Technical judges	
1	2	3	4	5
Luis Maluf	Fernanda Paes Leme	Felipe Massa	Anelita Gallo	Suellem Morimoto

Running order

Couple	Judges' score					Total score	Studio score	Week total	Final total	Result (week 1–7)
Couple	1	2	3	4	5	Total score	Studio score	Week total	Final total	Result (week 1–7)
Danielle & Fernando	Did not perform due to an ankle injury							00.0	117.9	~~Dance-off~~ Advanced
Giullia & Danniel	9.9	10	10	9.9	9.9	49.7	9.8	59.5	236.3	2nd
Guta & Marcus	9.8	9.9	9.9	9.7	9.7	49.0	9.7	58.7	232.9	~~Dance-off~~ Advanced
Lucy & Léo	10	10	10	9.8	9.8	49.6	9.9	59.5	236.5	1st
Isabeli & Igor	9.9	9.9	9.9	9.7	9.7	49.1	9.8	58.9	234.1	~~Dance-off~~ Advanced
Luiza & Daniel	10	10	9.9	9.9	9.8	49.6	9.9	59.5	236.2	3rd

=== Week 8 ===
Week 4 – Men

- Style: Rock

Artistic judges			Technical judges	
1	2	3	4	5
Cris Vianna	Paulo Ricardo	Mariana Ximenes	Anelita Gallo	Suellem Morimoto

Running order

Couple	Judges' score					Total score	Studio score	Week total	Final total	Result (week 2–8)
Couple	1	2	3	4	5	Total score	Studio score	Week total	Final total	Result (week 2–8)
Felipe & Brennda	Did not perform due to COVID-19							00.0	177.4	Withdrew
Zé Roberto & Larissa	Did not perform due to a backache							00.0	176.2	Withdrew
Belutti & Bruna	10	10	9.9	9.8	9.8	49.5	9.8	59.3	235.9	3rd
Marcelo & Beatriz	10	10	10	9.7	9.7	49.4	9.9	59.3	236.3	2nd
André & Paula	10	10	10	9.8	9.9	49.7	9.9	59.6	237.1	1st

=== Week 9 ===
Group 1

- Style: Foxtrot

Artistic judges			Technical judges	
1	2	3	4	5
Fernanda Motta	Thiago Arancam	Ellen Rocche	Caio Nunes	Carol Soares

Running order

Couple	Judges' score					Total score	Studio score	Week total	Final total	Result (week 9–10)
Couple	1	2	3	4	5	Total score	Studio score	Week total	Final total	Result (week 9–10)
Marcelo & Beatriz	10	10	10	9.8	9.8	49.6	9.8	—	59.4	4th
Lucy & Léo	10	10	10	9.8	9.7	49.5	9.7	—	59.2	7th
Belutti & Bruna	10	10	10	9.9	9.7	49.6	9.9	—	59.5	2nd
Luiza & Daniel	10	10	10	9.7	9.8	49.5	9.8	—	59.3	6th

=== Week 10 ===
Group 2

- Style: Foxtrot

Artistic judges			Technical judges	
1	2	3	4	5
Lucas Lucco	Jayme Matarazzo	Dani Calabresa	Caio Nunes	Carol Soares

Running order

Couple	Judges' score					Total score	Studio score	Week total	Final total	Result (week 9–10)
Couple	1	2	3	4	5	Total score	Studio score	Week total	Final total	Result (week 9–10)
Giullia & Danniel	10	10	10	9.8	9.8	49.6	9.8	—	59.4	6th
Guta & Jefferson	10	10	10	9.7	9.7	49.4	9.7	—	59.1	9th
André & Paula	10	10	10	9.9	9.8	49.7	9.9	—	59.6	2nd
Isabeli & Igor	10	10	10	9.7	9.7	49.4	9.8	—	59.2	7th
Danielle & Fernando	10	10	10	10	10	50.0	9.9	—	59.9	1st

=== Week 11 ===
Week 1 – Semifinals

- Style: Samba

Artistic judges			Technical judges	
1	2	3	4	5
Lexa	Cristina Padiglione	Viviane Araújo	Lore Improta	Carol Agnelo

Running order

Couple	Judges' score					Total score	Studio score	Week total	Final total	Result (week 9–12)
Couple	1	2	3	4	5	Total score	Studio score	Week total	Final total	Result (week 9–12)
Danielle & Fernando	10	10	10	9.9	10	49.9	9.8	59.7	119.6	1st (Finalist)
Guta & Jefferson	9.9	9.7	10	9.8	9.8	49.2	9.7	58.9	118.0	Eliminated
Luiza & Daniel	10	10	10	9.8	9.9	49.7	9.9	59.6	118.9	Eliminated

=== Week 12 ===
Week 2 – Semifinals

- Style: Samba

Artistic judges			Technical judges	
1	2	3	4	5
Suzana Pires	Marcello Melo Jr.	Simaria Mendes	Lore Improta	Carol Agnelo

Running order

Couple	Judges' score					Total score	Studio score	Week total	Final total	Result (week 9–12)
Couple	1	2	3	4	5	Total score	Studio score	Week total	Final total	Result (week 9–12)
Belutti & Bruna	Did not perform due to COVID-19							00.0	059.5	Withdrew
André & Paula	9.8	9.9	10	9.9	9.9	49.5	9.7	59.2	118.4	Eliminated
Isabeli & Igor	9.9	9.9	9.8	9.7	9.7	49.0	9.7	58.7	117.9	Eliminated
Marcelo & Beatriz	9.8	10	9.9	9.8	9.8	49.3	9.7	59.0	118.4	Eliminated
Giullia & Danniel	10	10	10	9.9	10	49.9	10	59.9	119.3	2nd (Finalist)
Lucy & Reginaldo	10	10	10	10	10	50.0	10	60.0	119.2	3rd (Finalist)

=== Week 13 ===
Top 3 – Finals

- Styles: Waltz & Tango

Artistic judges			Technical judges	
1	2	3	4	5
Érika Januza	Kaysar Dadour	Paolla Oliveira	Thiago Soares	Claudia Motta

Running order

Waltz
Couple	Judges' score					Total score	Studio score	Dance total	Final total	Result
Couple	1	2	3	4	5	Total score	Studio score	Dance total	Final total	Result
Giullia & Danniel	10	10	10	9.9	9.9	49.8	9.8	59.6	—	N/A
Danielle & Fernando	10	10	10	10	10	50.0	9.8	59.8	—	N/A
Lucy & Reginaldo	10	10	10	10	9.9	49.9	10	59.9	—	N/A

Tango
Couple	Judges' score					Total score	Studio score	Dance total	Final total	Result
Couple	1	2	3	4	5	Total score	Studio score	Dance total	Final total	Result
Giullia & Danniel	10	10	10	10	10	50.0	9.8	59.8	119.4	Third place
Danielle & Fernando	10	10	10	10	10	50.0	9.9	59.9	119.7	Runner-up
Lucy & Reginaldo	10	10	10	9.9	10	49.9	10	59.9	119.8	Winner
