= Rodeo Rock =

Zero to Hero (original title Rodeio Rock)
- Directed by: Marcelo Antunez
- Written by: Felipe Folgosi
- Produced by: Ricardo Fadel Rihan; Ivan Teixeira
- Starring: Carla Diaz; Lucas Lucco; Vitor diCastro; Felipe Hintze; Felipe Folgosi; Charles Paraventi
- Production company: Lighthouse
- Distributed by: Downtown Filmes
- Release date: 5 October 2023
- Running time: 108 minutes
- Country: Brazil
- Language: Brazilian Portuguese

Rodeo Rock (in Portuguese Rodeio Rock) is a 2023 Brazilian romantic comedy film, produced by Lighthouse. It was directed by Marcelo Antunez and written by Felipe Folgosi.

The film premiered on October 5, 2023, and stars Lucas Lucco and Carla Diaz.

== Summary ==
Hero has a real aversion to everything he considers “commercial”, becoming uncompromising, mainly because he is extremely similar-looking to the greatest Brazilian country singer, Sandro Sanderlei. Of course, this stance makes life hard for Hero, who has his biggest break when Sandro slips into a coma when he is getting lipo.

Unemployed and heavily in debt, Hero is convinced by his drummer, friend and faithful squire, Panza, to accept the invitation to pose as Sandro on his tour, despite all of his convictions.

Hero goes on tour, where he meets Lulli, Sandro's ex-girlfriend. He ends up falling in love with her, despite her treating him badly, blaming him for Sandro's cheating.

Hero, prevented from revealing his true identity, ends up discovering during the tour that balancing success, fame and demands with artistic integrity and personal life is more complicated than he imagined.

== Cast ==
- Lucas Lucco as Sandro Sanderley / Hero
- Carla Diaz as Lulli
- Felipe Hintze as Pança
- Felipe Folgosi as Jacques Barreto
- Charles Paraventi as Agnaldo
- Paula Cohen as Matilde
- Norival Rizzo as Bento
- Marcelo Flores as Genival
- Sérgio Loroza as Tony
- Vitor diCastro as Tavinho Chantecler
