= Viviane Araújo =

Viviane Araújo may refer to:

- Viviane Araújo (actress) (born 1975), Brazilian actress and model
- Viviane Araújo (fighter) (born 1986), Brazilian mixed martial artist
