= Paloma Tocci =

Brazilian journalist (born 1982)

- Born: July 12, 1982 (age 44); São Paulo, Brazil
- Occupations: Journalist and TV host
- Spouse: Felipe Maricondi (m. 2016–2020)
- Partner: Rubens Barrichello (2020-2022)
- Children: 1

Paloma Garrues Soubihe Tocci, better known as Paloma Tocci (born July 12, 1982), is a Brazilian journalist and TV host.

== Biography ==
Paloma's last name comes from Italy, inherited from her grandparents (Tòcci). She graduated in journalism from Faculdades Integradas Alcântara Machado. She interned at Rede Bandeirantes, initially in the newsroom for Journalism, then moving on to Sport. She worked as a sports reporter for four years on the program Jogo Aberto and on the program Galera Gol on Transamérica Pop radio in São Paulo. She has already been on the paid channel BandSports and while still at Band, she served as a reporter at the 2007 Pan American Games and at the 2008 Summer Olympics, where she was chosen by journalists from all over the world as the muse of the Press Center for the Beijing Olympic Games.

On April 5, 2010, she signed a contract with RedeTV! after having received a proposal from the broadcaster to assume command of RedeTV! Esporte on April 19, replacing Flávia Noronha, who went to TV Fama, in addition to presenting Belas na Rede on the same channel. After two years she returned to Rede Bandeirantes, where she works as a reporter and presenter. She presented the program Deu Olé until March 16, 2013. From Monday to Friday, she started to present the program Zoo, Café com Jornal, sporadically Jogo Aberto and, on Sundays, Band Esporte Clube. She also presented De Primeira on the radio Bradesco Esportes FM.

She joined the rotation of presenters at Jornal da Band in 2014 and, the following year, started to present the newspaper on a permanent basis with journalist Ricardo Boechat, replacing Ticiana Villas Boas, who moved to SBT. Paloma stayed on the news until February 1, 2019, when the non-renewal of her contract with the broadcaster was announced. In 2020, she returned to the station to command the sports block in Jornal da Band and Band Esporte Clube, shortly after Paloma stopped presenting only the sports block in the newspaper and started to command the news in general alongside Joana Treptow, Lana Canepa and Eduardo Oinegue.

In October 2024, Paloma changed Band by Record, passing to integrate the sports team of the network starting 2025. Her debut in the new station occurred on November 27, 2024, in JR Esporte, sports segment of Jornal da Record. Since January 19, 2025, Tocci also presents Esporte Record, sharing the presentation of the program with Cléber Machado.

== Personal life ==
Paloma was married to businessman Felipe Maricondi. On June 18, 2018, the couple's first daughter, named Maya, was born.

In 2020, she publicly assumed the romance with pilot Rubens Barrichello.
