= Treptow (surname) =

Treptow is a toponymic surname of eastern German origin. Notable people with the surname include:

- Günther Treptow (1907–1981), German operatic tenor
- Joana Treptow (born 1993), Portuguese-Brazilian journalist and television host
- Reinhard Treptow (1892–after 1917), German flying ace
