= Alexandre Barillari =

Brazilian actor

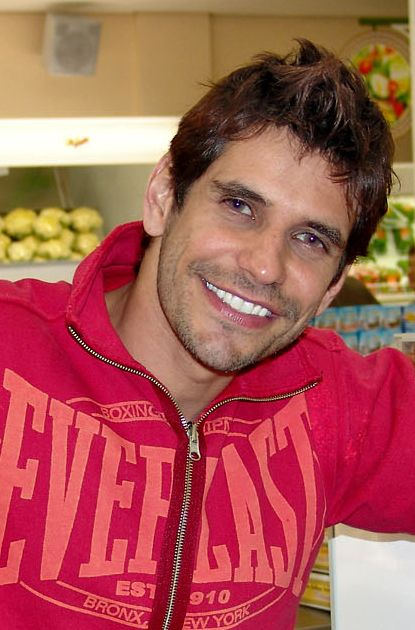
- Alexandre Barillari
- Born: March 19, 1975 (age 50); Rio de Janeiro, Brazil
- Occupation: Actor
- Years active: 1996–present

Alexandre Barillari (born Alexandre Barillari de Almeida, March 19, 1975, Rio de Janeiro) is a Brazilian actor.

== Filmography ==
Television
Year	Title	Role
1996–1997	Salsa e Merengue	Antônio
1998	Malhação 98	Tadeu
2000	Vidas Cruzadas	Aquiles
2000–2001	O Cravo e a Rosa	Leonardo Mendes
2003–2004	Chocolate com Pimenta	Alberto Lares
2004–2005	Senhora do Destino	Doctor Fabio
2005–2006	Alma Gêmea	Guto
2005	Dança dos Famosos	Himself
2006	Cristal	Gustavo Palhares
2007–2008	Caminhos do Coração	Ramon Fusily
2009	A Lei e o Crime	Airplane Pilot
2009–2010	Bela, a Feia	Douglas Nogueira
2012	Rei Davi	Urias
2017	Belaventura	Tácitus Mascate
