= Dança dos Famosos season 1 =

Dança dos Famosos
- Season 1
- Celebrity winner: Karina Bacchi
- Professional winner: Fabiano Vivas
- No. of episodes: 5

Release
- Original network: Globo
- Original release: 20 November – 18 December 2005

Season chronology
- Next → Season 2

Dança dos Famosos 1, known at the time as Dança dos Famosos was the debut season of the Brazilian version of the international reality franchise Strictly Come Dancing, which premiered 20 November 2005 and ended 18 December 2005 on the Rede Globo television network. Six celebrities were paired with six professional ballroom dancers. Faustão and Adriana Colin were the hosts for this season.

Actress and model Karina Bacchi won the competition over actor Alexandre Barillari.

== Couples ==
Celebrity	Notability (known for)	Professional	Status
Oscar Schmidt	Former basketball player	Michelle Cerbino	Withdrew on 20 November 2005
Felipe Dylon	Singer	Daiane Amêndola	Eliminated 1st on 27 November 2005
Fabiana Karla	Zorra Total cast member	Marco Aurélio	Eliminated 2nd on 4 December 2005
Daniela Escobar	Actress	Edson Carneiro	Eliminated 3rd on 11 December 2005
Alexandre Barillari	Actor	Aline Phyrro	Runner-up on 18 December 2005
Karina Bacchi	Actress & model	Fabiano Vivas	Winner on 18 December 2005

== Elimination chart ==
Lowest score	Highest score	Eliminated	Bottom two	Withdrew
Lowest score	Highest score	Runner-up	Winners	

Couple	Place	1	2	3	4	5
Karina & Fabiano	1	29	28	30	26	130
Alexandre & Aline	2	24	27	30	24	129
Daniela & Edson	3	26	26	30	21	
Fabiana & Marco	4	23	27	26		
Felipe & Daiane	5	21	22			
Oscar & Michelle	6	WD				

== Weekly results ==
=== Week 1 ===
- Style: Salsa

Aired: 20 November 2005

=== Week 2 ===
- Style: Bolero

Aired: 27 November 2005

=== Week 3 ===
- Style: Lambada

Aired: 4 December 2005

=== Week 4 ===
- Style: Samba

Aired: 11 December 2005

=== Week 5 ===
- Style: Waltz, Pasodoble & Tango

Aired: 18 December 2005
