= Guta Stresser =

Brazilian actress, writer, and theatre director

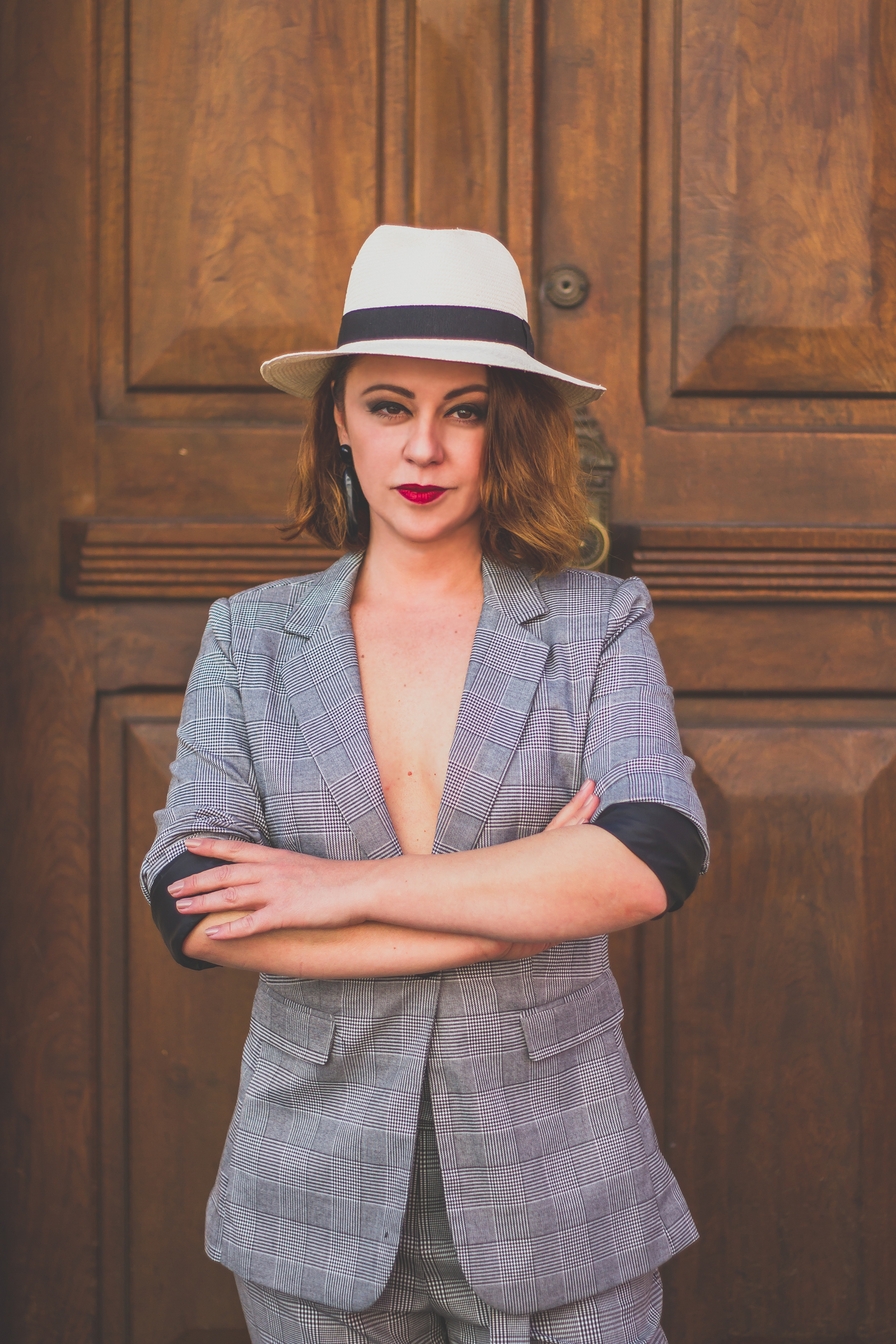
- Stresser in 2018
- Born: Maria Augusta Labatut Stresser; 28 September 1972 (age 52); Curitiba, Brazil
- Occupations: Actress; writer; theatre director
- Years active: 2001–present
- Height: 1.62 m (5 ft 4 in)
- Father: Ronald Sanson Stresser

Maria Augusta Labatut Stresser (born 28 September 1972), known professionally as Guta Stresser, is a Brazilian actress, writer, and theatre director.

== Filmography ==
=== Television ===
Year	Title	Role	Notes
2001–2014	A Grande Família	Maria Isabel Silva Carrara "Bebel"	Seasons 1-14
2015	Amorteamo	Cândida	
2015–2016	Mister Brau	Maria Augusta	Seasons 1–2
2018–2019	Malhação: Vidas Brasileiras	Rosália da Paz	Season 26
2020	Dança dos Famosos	Contestant	Season 17
2025	Show 60 Anos	Maria Isabel Silva Carrara "Bebel"	Television special

=== Film ===
Year	Title	Role	Notes
2001	A Partilha	Célia	
2001	Bellini and the Sphinx	Stripper	
2001	Do Tempo que Eu Comia Pipoca	Clara	Short film
2002	Metade Sexo, Metade Mussarela	Adelina	
2004	Nina	Nina	
2004	Redeemer	Flávia	
2006	Balada das Duas Mocinhas de Botafogo	Marília	Short film
2007	A Grande Família - O Filme	Maria Isabel da Silva Carrara "Bebel"	
2008	Sexo Virtual	Neuma	Short film
2008	Vingança	Raquel	
2015	Tudo Que Deus Criou	Ângela	
2015	O Tempo Feliz que Passou	Graça	
2017	Ninguém Entra, Ninguém Sai	Francisca	
2018	Antes que eu me Esqueça	Joelma	
2019	Bois, Raposas & Crocodilos	Patrícia	
2020	Alice & Só	Unknown	
2021	Missão Cupido	Dona Marlene	
2021	Valentina	Márcia	
2022	Júpiter	Teresa	Original HBO Max

== Stage ==
- 1992 - O Vampiro e a Polaquinha (Director: Ademar Guerra)
- 2004 - Mais Uma Vez Amor (Director: Ernesto Piccolo)
- 2005 - De Como a Jovem Atriz Rita Formiga, Minha Amiga e Vizinha, Ocupa Meu Telefone Todos os Dias de Quatro a Seis da Tarde, Que É Justamente o Meu Horário Predileto de Escrever (Director: Domingos de Oliveira)
