= Nina (2004 film) =

2004 film directed by Heitor Dhalia

- Theatrical release poster
- Directed by: Heitor Dhalia
- Screenplay by: Marçal Aquino
- Based on: Crime and Punishment by Fyodor Dostoevsky
- Produced by: Caio Gullane; Fabiano Gullane
- Starring: Guta Stresser; Myriam Muniz; Sabrina Greve; Luiza Mariani; Juliana Galdino
- Cinematography: José Roberto Eliezer
- Edited by: Estevan Santos
- Music by: Antônio Pinto
- Production companies: Branca Filmes; Fábrica Brasileira de Imagens; Gullane Filmes; Quanta Centro de Produções Cinematográficas
- Distributed by: Columbia TriStar Film Distributors International
- Release date: 2004
- Running time: 85 minutes
- Country: Brazil
- Language: Portuguese
- Budget: BRL 2.442.740 (estimated)

Nina is a 2004 Brazilian drama film directed by Heitor Dhalia and starring Guta Stresser and Myriam Muniz. The plot is loosely based on the 1886 Fyodor Dostoevsky's novel Crime and Punishment. The setting is described to be of a dark humor nature in an urban new-age post apocalyptic gothic world, and includes manga-like animations throughout the film.

== Synopsis ==
Set in today's São Paulo, the film tells the story of Nina, a poor young girl, disorderly seeking a means of survival in today's cruel society and only comes across adversity. She lives in a rented room. Her landlady Eulália, an old and decrepit reincarnation of the old miser killed by Raskólnikov on Crime and Punishment, humiliates her the entire time, violates her correspondence, confiscates the money her mother sends, locks up the refrigerator to prevent her access the food stored there, each one of them with the label "Eulália" on it, a symbol of the purchasing power, the right to consume and of the humiliation of the fellow man.

== Cast ==
- Guta Stresser as Nina
- Myriam Muniz as Eulália
- Sabrina Greve as Sofia
- Luiza Mariani as Alice
- Juliana Galdino as Ana
- Milhem Cortaz as Carlão
- Guilherme Weber as Arthur
- Abrahão Farc as old man
- Wagner Moura as blind man
- Selton Mello as Ana's boyfriend
- Renata Sorrah as prostitute
- Lázaro Ramos as painter #1
- Matheus Nachtergaele as painter #2
- Anderson Faganello
- Ailton Graça
- Walter Portela
- Eduardo Semmerjian
- Nivaldo Todaro
