= Dança dos Famosos season 2 =

Dança dos Famosos
- Season 2
- Celebrity winner: Juliana Didone
- Professional winner: Leandro Azevedo
- No. of episodes: 6

Release
- Original network: Globo
- Original release: February 12 – March 26, 2006

Season chronology
- ← Previous; Season 1 Next → Season 3

Dança dos Famosos 2 was the second season of the Brazilian reality television show Dança dos Famosos which premiered on February 12, 2006 on Rede Globo.

Malhação cast member Juliana Didone & Leandro Azevedo won the competition over singer Kelly Key & Marcelo Chocolate.

== Couples ==
Celebrity	Notability (known for)	Professional	Status
Dado Dolabella	Actor	Beatriz Pavinni	Eliminated 1st on February 12, 2006
Sandra de Sá	Singer	Marcelo Simões	Eliminated 2nd on March 5, 2006
Thiago Fragoso	Actor	Sabrina Cabral	Withdrew on March 12, 2006
Pedro Bismark	Zorra Total cast member	Nana Nassif	Eliminated 3rd on March 19, 2006
Kelly Key	Singer	Marcelo Chocolate	Runner-up on March 26, 2006
Juliana Didone	Malhação cast member	Leandro Azevedo	Winner on March 26, 2006

== Elimination chart ==
Lowest score	Highest score	Eliminated	Bottom two	Withdrew
Lowest score	Highest score	Runner-up	Winners	

Couple	Place	1	2	3	4	5	6
Juliana & Leandro	1	38	32	35	34	33	172
Kelly & Chocolate	2	39	38	31	36	32	170
Pedro & Nana	3	34	34	29	32	33	
Thiago & Sabrina	4	40	38	39	WD		
Sandra & Marcelo	5	35	31	29			
Dado & Beatriz	6	33					

== Weekly results ==
=== Week 1 ===
- Style: Forró

Aired: February 12, 2006

Couple	Dance total	Final total	Result
Thiago & Sabrina	40	40	1st
Kelly & Chocolate	39	39	2nd
Juliana & Leandro	38	38	3rd
Sandra & Marcelo	35	35	4th
Pedro & Nana	34	34	5th
Dado & Beatriz	33	33	Eliminated

=== Week 2 ===
- Style: Bolero

Aired: February 19, 2006

Couple	Dance total	Final total	Result
Thiago & Sabrina	38	78	1st
Kelly & Chocolate	38	77	2nd
Juliana & Leandro	32	70	3rd
Pedro & Nana	34	68	4th
Sandra & Marcelo	31	66	5th

=== Week 3 ===
- Style: Salsa

Aired: March 5, 2006

Couple	Dance total	Final total	Result
Thiago & Sabrina	39	117	1st
Kelly & Chocolate	31	108	2nd
Juliana & Leandro	35	106	3rd
Pedro & Nana	29	97	4th
Sandra & Marcelo	29	95	Eliminated

=== Week 4 ===
- Style: Samba

Aired: March 12, 2006

Couple	Dance total	Final total	Result
Kelly & Chocolate	36	144	1st
Juliana & Leandro	34	140	2nd
Pedro & Nana	32	129	3rd
Thiago & Sabrina			Withdrew

=== Week 5 ===
- Style: Pasodoble

Aired: March 19, 2006

Couple	Dance total	Final total	Result
Kelly & Chocolate	32	176	1st
Juliana & Leandro	33	173	2nd
Pedro & Nana	33	162	Eliminated

=== Week 6 ===
- Style: Mambo, Rock and Roll & Tango

Aired: March 26, 2006

Mambo
Couple	Dance total	Final total	Result
Kelly & Chocolate	59	59	N/A
Juliana & Leandro	53	53	N/A

Rock and Roll
Couple	Dance total	Final total	Result
Kelly & Chocolate	56	115	N/A
Juliana & Leandro	59	112	N/A

Tango
Couple	Dance total	Final total	Result
Kelly & Chocolate	55	170	Runner-up
Juliana & Leandro	60	172	Winner
