= Penélope Nova =

Brazilian television contestant

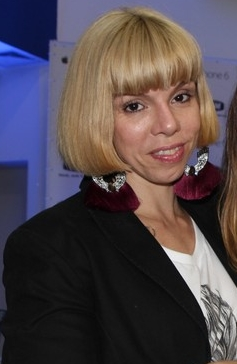
- Nova in 2015
- Born: Penélope Contrim Nova; August 19, 1973 (age 53); Salvador, BA, Brazil
- Known for: VJ for MTV Brasil

Penélope Contrim Nova (Salvador, 19 August 1973) was an MTV Brazil VJ. She's a daughter of Marcelo Nova.

== Career ==
Penélope began her career in radio, and in 1997 joined MTV Brazil, where she worked as a TAR (Talent and Artist Relations) assistant. In 2001 she was invited to host a show called Riff, on which she showed video clips of rock n' roll songs, and some time later Ponto Pê, a program that gave especially young people advice on sex. Penélope also hosted, by the year 2007, the youth program A Fila Anda. Penélope recently had two other TV shows, one called MTV na Rua (MTV on the Street), on which she chatted with young people to ask their opinions about several issues of daily life, and the second was Lavanderia MTV, on which she discussed themes about social problems. Her contract with MTV ended 'by mutual consent' in February 2011. However, in March 2011 MTV reinstated her on their Saturday morning slot.
