= Cléber Machado =

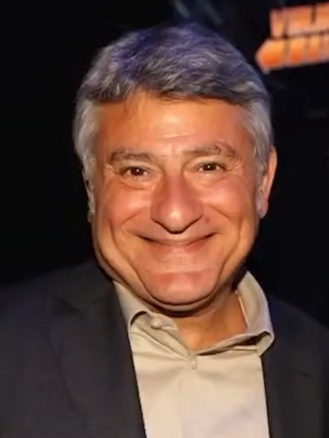
- Machado in 2019.
- Born: March 29, 1962 (age 64); São Paulo, Brazil
- Occupations: Sports journalist and commentator
- Children: 1

Cléber Tadeu Machado, better known as Cléber Machado (born March 29, 1962) is a Brazilian sports journalist and commentator. He is currently Record's lead presenter, where he also co-presents Esporte Record with Paloma Tocci.

== Career ==
Machado graduated in journalism at FMU.

He started his career in the late 1970s, working at Rádio Bandeirantes and Rádio Tupi supported by his father, the art director Clodoaldo José Machado. The following year, he went to the Sistema Globo de Rádio, where he began his work in sports on Osmar Santos' crew.

In television, he started working at TV Gazeta and later at TV Globo Vale do Paraíba, in São José dos Campos. In 1988, he moved to TV Globo São Paulo. Since then, he has been part of the network coverage of some of the world's most important sporting events, including Formula 1, the Olympics, the FIFA World Cup, international boxing, and the São Silvestre Race, among others.

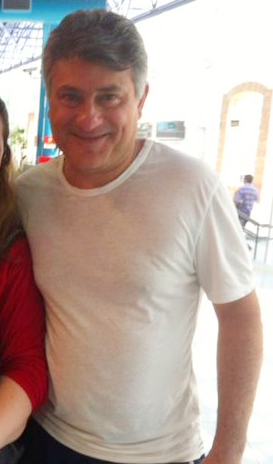
Cléber Machado in 2012

On 22 March 2023, Machado was fired from Globo after 35 years.

On March 30, Cléber Machado was hired by Record to broadcast the two matches of the Campeonato Paulista final on April 2 and 9. On April 3, he was hired by the streaming service Prime Video to broadcast the Copa do Brasil matches. On September 1, Cléber was hired by SBT to join the network's team of sports commentators and presenters.
