= Dança dos Famosos season 12 =

Dança dos Famosos
- Season 12
- Celebrity winner: Viviane Araújo
- Professional winner: Marcelo Granjeiro
- No. of episodes: 17

Release
- Original network: Globo
- Original release: August 2 – December 6, 2015

Season chronology
- ← Previous; Season 11 Next → Season 13

Dança dos Famosos 2015 is the twelfth season of the Brazilian reality television show Dança dos Famosos which premiered on August 2, 2015, with the competitive live shows beginning on the following week on August 9, 2015 at 7:30 p.m./6:30 p.m. (BRT/AMT) on Rede Globo.

On December 6, actress Viviane Araújo & Marcelo Grangeiro won the competition over Malhação cast member Arthur Aguiar & Mayara Araújo and Zorra cast member Mariana Santos & Marcus Lobo, who took 2nd and 3rd place respectively.

== Couples ==
Celebrity	Known for	Professional	Status
Flávio Canto	Former judoka & TV host	Ivi Pizzott	Eliminated 1st on September 20, 2015
Érico Bras	Tapas & Beijos cast member	Gabrielle Cardoso	Eliminated 2nd on September 20, 2015
Fernando Rocha	Journalist & Bem Estar host	Juliana Valcézia	Eliminated 3rd on September 20, 2015
Françoise Forton; Returned on October 4	Actress	Patrick Carvalho	Eliminated 4th on September 27, 2015
Mariana Santos; Returned on October 4	Zorra cast member	Marcus Lobo	Eliminated 5th on September 27, 2015
Agatha Moreira; Returned on October 4	Actress	Leandro Azevedo	Eliminated 6th on September 27, 2015
Françoise Forton	Actress	Patrick Carvalho	Eliminated 7th on October 18, 2015
Bruno Boncini	Musician & Malta frontman	Ana Paula Guedes	Eliminated 8th on October 25, 2015
Maurren Maggi	Olympic athlete	Roberto Mota	Eliminated 9th on November 1, 2015
Negra Li	Singer	Edgar Fernandes	Eliminated 10th on November 8, 2015
Agatha Moreira	Actress	Leandro Azevedo	Eliminated 11th on November 22, 2015
Igor Rickli	Actor	Suellem Morimoto	Eliminated 12th on November 29, 2015
Mariana Santos	Zorra cast member	Marcus Lobo	Third place on December 6, 2015
Arthur Aguiar	Malhação cast member	Mayara Araújo	Runner-up on December 6, 2015
Viviane Araújo	Actress	Marcelo Grangeiro	Winner on December 6, 2015

== Elimination chart ==
Couple	Place	1	2	3	4	5	6	7	8	9	10	11	12	13	14	15	16
Viviane & Marcelo	1	—	49.3	—	49.3	—	49.9	—	49.8	—	—	49.6	49.9	49.9	50.0	59.8	159.4
Arthur & Mayara	2	49.8	—	49.5	—	49.7	—	49.6	—	—	48.4	—	49.5	50.0	49.3	59.4	155.2
Mariana & Marcus	3	—	47.4	—	48.7	—	49.6	—	49.1	5/20	—	49.2	49.0	49.6	49.6	59.1	156.1
Igor & Suellem	4	46.7	—	48.1	—	48.9	—	49.3	—	—	49.8	—	49.0	49.4	49.3	59.0	
Agatha & Leandro	5	—	45.9	—	48.9	—	49.5	—	49.2	6/20	49.4	—	49.3	49.5	48.4		
Negra Li & Edgar	6	—	49.5	—	49.1	—	49.8	—	49.2	—	49.5	—	49.5	49.5			
Maurren & Roberto	7	—	49.8	—	48.9	—	49.3	—	49.5	—	—	49.6	49.1				
Bruno & Ana Paula	8	48.8	—	49.4	—	48.4	—	48.5	—	—	—	48.7					
Françoise & Patrick	9	—	47.8	—	48.6	—	48.2	—	48.7	6/20	49.1						
Fernando & Juliana	10	46.8	—	49.0	—	49.5	—	48.3		1/20							
Érico & Gabrielle	11	46.8	—	49.3	—	48.1	—	49.3		2/20							
Flávio & Ivi	12	46.1	—	48.0	—	46.4	—	48.4		1/20							

Key
Lowest score
Highest score
Eliminated
Bottom two
Dance-off
Winner
Runner-up
Third place

== Weekly results ==
A – Artistic jury	T – Technical jury	S – Studio audience	V – Viewers at home
Bottom two		Eliminated	

=== Week 1 ===
Presentation of the Celebrities

Aired: August 2, 2015

=== Week 2 ===
Week 1 – Men

- Style: Disco

Aired: August 9, 2015

Artistic judges			Technical judges	
1	2	3	4	5
Artur Xexéo	Sheron Menezzes	Tiago Abravanel	Fernanda Chamma	Renato Vieira

Running order

Couple	Judges' score					Total score	Average score				Week total	Final total	Result
Couple	1	2	3	4	5	Total score	A	T	S	V	Week total	Final total	Result
Igor & Suellem	9.4	9.9	10	9.4	8.0	46.7	9.8	8.7	8.3	N/A	26.8	N/A	6th
Flávio & Ivi	9.3	9.9	10	9.0	7.9	46.1	9.7	8.5	8.8	N/A	27.0	N/A	5th
Bruno & Ana Paula	10	10	10	9.8	9.0	48.8	10	9.4	9.7	N/A	29.1	N/A	2nd
Fernando & Juliana	9.5	9.9	10	9.6	7.8	46.8	9.8	8.7	9.2	N/A	27.7	N/A	3rd
Érico & Gabrielle	9.9	9.9	10	9.2	7.8	46.8	9.9	8.5	9.2	N/A	26.7	N/A	3rd
Arthur & Mayara	9.8	10	10	10	9.8	49.8	9.9	9.9	9.8	N/A	29.6	N/A	1st

=== Week 3 ===
Week 1 – Women

- Style: Disco

Aired: August 16, 2015

Artistic judges			Technical judges	
1	2	3	4	5
Ana Beatriz Barros	Roger Flores	Vera Fischer	Jarbas H. de Mello	Carlota Portella

Running order

Couple	Judges' score					Total score	Average score				Week total	Final total	Result
Couple	1	2	3	4	5	Total score	A	T	S	V	Week total	Final total	Result
Mariana & Marcus	9.0	10	9.5	9.5	9.4	47.4	9.5	9.5	8.8	N/A	27.8	N/A	5th
Agatha & Leandro	9.5	9.7	9.4	8.5	8.8	45.9	9.5	8.7	8.6	N/A	26.8	N/A	6th
Negra Li & Edgar	10	10	9.9	9.9	9.7	49.5	10	9.8	9.4	N/A	29.2	N/A	2nd
Françoise & Patrick	9.2	9.6	9.9	9.4	9.7	47.8	9.6	9.6	8.7	N/A	27.9	N/A	4th
Maurren & Roberto	9.8	10	10	10	10	49.8	9.9	10	9.5	N/A	29.4	N/A	1st
Viviane & Marcelo	10	9.7	10	9.9	9.7	49.3	9.9	9.8	9.2	N/A	28.9	N/A	3rd

=== Week 4 ===
Week 2 – Men

- Style: Forró

Aired: August 23, 2015

Artistic judges			Technical judges	
1	2	3	4	5
Paloma Bernardi	Agnaldo Timóteo	Thassia Naves	JC Violla	Suelly Machado

Running order

Couple	Judges' score					Total score	Average score				Week total	Final total	Result
Couple	1	2	3	4	5	Total score	A	T	S	V	Week total	Final total	Result
Arthur & Mayara	9.9	10	10	9.7	9.9	49.5	10	9.8	8.9	N/A	28.7	58.3	1st
Érico & Gabrielle	10	9.8	10	9.7	9.8	49.3	9.9	9.8	9.0	N/A	28.7	56.3	3rd
Bruno & Ana Paula	10	9.9	9.9	9.8	9.8	49.4	10	9.8	8.6	N/A	28.4	57.5	2nd
Flávio & Ivi	9.8	9.5	9.8	9.5	9.4	48.0	9.7	9.5	8.3	N/A	27.5	54.5	6th
Igor & Suellem	9.5	9.5	10	9.4	9.7	48.1	9.8	9.6	9.3	N/A	28.7	55.5	5th
Fernando & Juliana	10	10	9.8	9.5	9.7	49.0	9.9	9.6	8.9	N/A	28.4	56.1	4th

=== Week 5 ===
Week 2 – Women

- Style: Forró

Aired: August 30, 2015

Artistic judges			Technical judges	
1	2	3	4	5
Emerson Fittipaldi	Cláudia Ohana	Tato	Regina Calil	Carlinhos de Jesus

Running order

Couple	Judges' score					Total score	Average score				Week total	Final total	Result
Couple	1	2	3	4	5	Total score	A	T	S	V	Week total	Final total	Result
Maurren & Roberto	10	9.9	9.8	9.4	9.8	48.9	9.9	9.6	8.2	N/A	27.7	57.1	3rd
Negra Li & Edgar	9.9	10	9.9	9.5	9.8	49.1	9.9	9.7	9.5	N/A	29.1	58.3	1st
Françoise & Patrick	9.8	9.8	9.7	9.5	9.8	48.6	9.8	9.7	9.3	N/A	28.7	56.6	4th
Agatha & Leandro	9.9	9.9	9.9	9.4	9.8	48.9	9.9	9.6	9.8	N/A	29.3	56.1	6th
Viviane & Marcelo	9.9	9.9	9.9	9.8	9.8	49.3	9.9	9.8	9.6	N/A	29.3	58.2	2nd
Mariana & Marcus	9.8	9.9	9.8	9.5	9.7	48.7	9.8	9.6	9.1	N/A	28.5	56.3	5th

=== Week 6 ===
Week 3 – Men

- Style: Rock

Aired: September 6, 2015

Artistic judges			Technical judges	
1	2	3	4	5
Cristina Padiglione	Antônio Fagundes	Vanessa Gerbelli	Marcelo Misailidis	Maria Pia Finócchio

Running order

Couple	Judges' score					Total score	Average score				Week total	Final total	Result
Couple	1	2	3	4	5	Total score	A	T	S	V	Week total	Final total	Result
Érico & Gabrielle	9.5	10	9.2	9.8	9.6	48.1	9.6	9.7	8.7	N/A	28.0	84.3	4th
Arthur & Mayara	10	10	10	9.8	9.9	49.7	10	9.9	9.3	N/A	29.2	87.5	1st
Igor & Suellem	9.3	10	9.6	10	10	48.9	9.6	10	9.2	N/A	28.8	84.3	4th
Flávio & Ivi	9.0	9.0	9.6	9.5	9.3	46.4	9.2	9.4	8.8	N/A	27.4	81.9	6th
Fernando & Juliana	9.7	10	9.9	10	9.9	49.5	9.9	10	9.2	N/A	29.1	85.2	3rd
Bruno & Ana Paula	9.5	10	9.6	9.6	9.7	48.4	9.7	9.7	9.2	N/A	28.6	86.1	2nd

=== Week 7 ===
Week 3 – Women

- Style: Rock

Aired: September 13, 2015

Artistic judges			Technical judges	
1	2	3	4	5
Wanderléa	Rodrigo Simas	Sonia Racy	Anselmo Zolla	Claudia Mota

Running order

Couple	Judges' score					Total score	Average score				Week total	Final total	Result
Couple	1	2	3	4	5	Total score	A	T	S	V	Week total	Final total	Result
Françoise & Patrick	9.9	9.7	9.3	9.5	9.8	48.2	9.6	9.7	8.4	N/A	27.7	84.3	6th
Agatha & Leandro	10	10	9.9	9.7	9.9	49.5	10	9.8	9.2	N/A	29.0	85.1	5th
Viviane & Marcelo	10	10	10	9.9	10	49.9	10	10	9.7	N/A	29.7	87.9	1st
Maurren & Roberto	10	9.9	9.9	9.7	9.8	49.3	9.9	9.8	9.0	N/A	28.7	85.8	3rd
Mariana & Marcus	10	10	9.9	9.8	9.9	49.6	10	9.9	9.7	N/A	29.5	85.8	3rd
Negra Li & Edgar	10	10	9.9	9.9	10	49.8	10	10	9.1	N/A	29.1	87.3	2nd

=== Week 8 ===
Week 4 – Men

- Style: Funk

Aired: September 20, 2015

Artistic judges			Technical judges	
1	2	3	4	5
MV Bill	Bárbara Paz	João Vitor Silva	Marcia Jaqueline	Fly

Running order

Couple	Judges' score					Total score	Average score				Week total	Final total	Result
Couple	1	2	3	4	5	Total score	A	T	S	V	Week total	Final total	Result
Bruno & Ana Paula	9.4	9.7	9.8	9.7	9.9	48.5	9.6	9.8	8.9	N/A	28.3	114.3	2nd
Fernando & Juliana	9.5	9.8	9.5	9.8	9.7	48.3	9.6	9.8	8.9	N/A	28.3	113.4	Dance-off
Arthur & Mayara	9.6	10	10	10	10	49.6	9.9	10	9.8	N/A	29.7	117.2	1st
Igor & Suellem	9.4	10	10	10	9.9	49.3	9.8	10	9.4	N/A	29.2	113.5	3rd
Érico & Gabrielle	9.7	10	9.8	9.9	9.9	49.3	9.8	9.9	9.2	N/A	28.9	113.2	Dance-off
Flávio & Ivi	9.3	9.8	9.8	9.7	9.8	48.4	9.6	9.8	8.9	N/A	28.3	110.5	Dance-off

=== Week 9 ===
Week 4 – Women

- Style: Funk

Aired: September 27, 2015

Artistic judges			Technical judges	
1	2	3	4	5
Deborah Secco	Flavio Ricco	Luma Costa	Octávio Nassur	Ana Botafogo

Running order

Couple	Judges' score					Total score	Average score				Week total	Final total	Result
Couple	1	2	3	4	5	Total score	A	T	S	V	Week total	Final total	Result
Negra Li & Edgar	10	9.8	9.9	9.7	9.8	49.2	9.9	9.8	8.9	N/A	28.6	115.9	2nd
Françoise & Patrick	10	9.8	9.9	9.4	9.6	48.7	9.9	9.5	9.1	N/A	28.5	112.8	Dance-off
Agatha & Leandro	10	9.9	10	9.7	9.6	49.2	10	9.7	9.6	N/A	29.2	114.3	Dance-off
Viviane & Marcelo	10	9.9	10	9.9	10	49.8	10	10	9.3	N/A	29.3	117.2	1st
Mariana & Marcus	10	9.9	9.8	9.7	9.7	49.1	9.9	9.7	8.9	N/A	28.5	114.3	Dance-off
Maurren & Roberto	10	10	9.9	9.9	9.7	49.5	10	9.8	9.2	N/A	29.0	114.8	3rd

=== Week 10 ===
Dance-off

- Style: Waltz

Aired: October 4, 2015

Artistic judges			Technical judges	
1	2	3	4	5
Carol Castro	Artur Xexéo	Giovanna Ewbank	Ivaldo Bertazzo	Lourdes Braga

Running order

Couple	Judges' vote					Total votes	Public vote				Week total	Final total	Result
Couple	1	2	3	4	5	Total votes	A	T	S	V	Week total	Final total	Result
Flávio & Ivi			✔			1	N/A				N/A	1	Eliminated
Mariana & Marcus	✔	✔		✔		3	N/A		✔	✔	N/A	5	Advanced
Fernando & Juliana				✔		1	N/A				N/A	1	Eliminated
Agatha & Leandro	✔	✔	✔		✔	4	N/A		✔	✔	N/A	6	Advanced
Érico & Gabrielle	✔				✔	2	N/A				N/A	1	Eliminated
Françoise & Patrick		✔	✔	✔	✔	4	N/A		✔	✔	N/A	6	Advanced

=== Week 11 ===
Team A

- Style: Foxtrot

Aired: October 18, 2015

Artistic judges			Technical judges	
1	2	3	4	5
Giba	Aline Weber	Ronnie Von	Aline Riscado	Ciro Barcellos

Running order

Couple	Judges' score					Total score	Average score				Week total	Final total	Result
Couple	1	2	3	4	5	Total score	A	T	S	V	Week total	Final total	Result
Françoise & Patrick	9.8	9.8	10	9.6	9.9	49.1	9.9	9.8	8.8	9.1	37.6	37.6	Eliminated
Arthur & Mayara	9.8	9.9	10	9.8	8.9	48.4	9.9	9.4	9.4	9.8	38.5	38.5	3rd
Negra Li & Edgar	9.8	9.8	10	9.9	10	49.5	9.9	10	9.3	9.3	38.5	38.5	3rd
Igor & Suellem	9.9	9.9	10	10	10	49.8	9.9	10	9.4	9.5	38.8	38.8	2nd
Agatha & Leandro	9.9	10	10	9.8	9.7	49.4	10	9.8	9.8	9.7	39.3	39.3	1st

=== Week 12 ===
Team B

- Style: Foxtrot

Aired: October 25, 2015

Artistic judges			Technical judges	
1	2	3	4	5
Zé Maurício Machline	Nelson Freitas	Anitta	Priscila Mota	JC Violla

Running order

Couple	Judges' score					Total score	Average score				Week total	Final total	Result
Couple	1	2	3	4	5	Total score	A	T	S	V	Week total	Final total	Result
Mariana & Marcus	9.8	10	10	9.8	9.6	49.2	9.9	9.7	8.9	9.3	37.8	37.8	3rd
Bruno & Ana Paula	9.8	10	9.8	9.6	9.5	48.7	9.9	9.6	8.8	9.4	37.7	37.7	Eliminated
Viviane & Marcelo	9.9	10	10	9.9	9.8	49.6	10	9.9	9.9	9.8	39.6	39.6	1st
Maurren & Roberto	9.8	9.8	10	10	10	49.6	9.9	10	9.7	9.5	39.1	39.1	2nd

=== Week 13 ===
Top 7

- Style: Lambada

Aired: November 1, 2015

Artistic judges			Technical judges	
1	2	3	4	5
Anderson Di Rizzi	Iara Jereissati	Luís Fernando Guimarães	Carlota Portella	Caio Nunes

Running order

Couple	Judges' score					Total score	Average score				Week total	Final total	Result
Couple	1	2	3	4	5	Total score	A	T	S	V	Week total	Final total	Result
Maurren & Roberto	9.8	10	10	9.6	9.7	49.1	9.9	9.7	9.0	9.2	37.8	37.8	Eliminated
Igor & Suellem	9.9	10	9.9	9.6	9.6	49.0	9.9	9.6	9.2	9.4	38.1	38.1	5th
Mariana & Marcus	10	10	10	9.5	9.5	49.0	10	9.5	9.3	9.3	38.1	38.1	6th
Agatha & Leandro	9.9	10	10	9.7	9.7	49.3	10	9.7	9.5	9.6	38.8	38.8	3rd
Arthur & Mayara	10	10	10	9.7	9.8	49.5	10	9.8	9.6	9.9	39.3	39.3	2nd
Negra Li & Edgar	10	10	9.9	9.8	9.8	49.5	10	9.8	9.1	9.4	38.3	38.3	4th
Viviane & Marcelo	10	10	10	10	9.9	49.9	10	10	9.5	9.9	39.4	39.4	1st

=== Week 14 ===
Top 6

- Style: Salsa

Aired: November 8, 2015

Artistic judges			Technical judges	
1	2	3	4	5
Maria Júlia Coutinho	Luis Maluf	Cris Vianna	Renato Vieira	Suely Machado

Running order

Couple	Judges' score					Total score	Average score				Week total	Final total	Result
Couple	1	2	3	4	5	Total score	A	T	S	V	Week total	Final total	Result
Viviane & Marcelo	10	9.9	10	10	10	49.9	10	10	9.4	9.8	39.2	78.6	2nd
Negra Li & Edgar	10	9.8	10	9.9	9.8	49.5	9.9	9.9	8.7	9.2	37.7	76.0	Eliminated
Igor & Suellem	9.8	10	10	9.9	9.7	49.4	9.9	9.8	9.6	9.6	39.8	77.0	5th
Mariana & Marcus	10	9.9	10	9.9	9.8	49.6	10	9.9	9.6	9.6	39.1	77.2	4th
Agatha & Leandro	9.9	10	10	9.8	9.8	49.5	10	9.8	9.2	9.6	38.6	77.4	3rd
Arthur & Mayara	10	10	10	10	10	50.0	10	10	9.7	9.9	39.6	78.9	1st

=== Week 15 ===
Top 5

- Style: Frevo

Aired: November 22, 2015

Artistic judges			Technical judges	
1	2	3	4	5
Donata Meirelles	Kaká	Paolla Oliveira	Ivaldo Bertazzo	Ana Botafogo

Running order

Couple	Judges' score					Total score	Average score				Week total	Final total	Result
Couple	1	2	3	4	5	Total score	A	T	S	V	Week total	Final total	Result
Arthur & Mayara	10	10	10	9.3	10	49.3	10	9.7	9.2	9.9	38.8	117.7	2nd
Agatha & Leandro	9.8	9.8	9.8	9.4	9.6	48.4	9.8	9.5	9.1	9.4	37.8	115.2	Eliminated
Mariana & Marcus	10	10	10	9.7	9.9	49.6	10	9.8	9.7	9.6	39.1	116.3	3rd
Igor & Suellem	9.9	9.8	10	9.8	9.8	49.3	9.9	9.8	9.3	9.6	38.6	115.6	4th
Viviane & Marcelo	10	10	10	10	10	50.0	10	10	9.7	9.9	39.6	118.2	1st

=== Week 16 ===
Top 4

- Style: Pasodoble

Aired: November 29, 2015

Artistic judges			Technical judges	
1	2	3	5	6
Fernanda Motta	Klebber Toledo	Juliana Paes	JC Violla	Maria Pia Finócchio
4				
Sophia Abrahão

Running order

Couple	Judges' score			Total score	Average score				Week total	Final total	Result
Couple	1	2	3	Total score	A	T	S	V	Week total	Final total	Result
Couple	4	5	6	Total score	A	T	S	V	Week total	Final total	Result
Igor & Suellem	10	9.8	10	59.0	10	9.6	8.8	9.7	38.1	153.7	Eliminated
Igor & Suellem	10	9.5	9.7	59.0	10	9.6	8.8	9.7	38.1	153.7	Eliminated
Mariana & Marcus	10	10	10	59.1	10	9.6	9.3	9.5	38.5	154.7	3rd
Mariana & Marcus	10	9.7	9.4	59.1	10	9.6	9.3	9.5	38.5	154.7	3rd
Viviane & Marcelo	10	10	10	59.8	10	9.9	9.7	9.8	39.4	157.6	1st
Viviane & Marcelo	10	10	9.8	59.8	10	9.9	9.7	9.8	39.4	157.6	1st
Arthur & Mayara	10	9.9	10	59.4	10	9.8	9.1	9.9	38.1	156.5	2nd
Arthur & Mayara	10	9.5	10	59.4	10	9.8	9.1	9.9	38.1	156.5	2nd

=== Week 17 ===
Top 3

- Styles: Samba & Tango

Aired: December 6, 2015

Artistic judges			Technical judges	
1	2	3	6	7
Artur Xexéo	Isabeli Fontana	Galvão Bueno	Fernanda Chamma	Paulo Gourlart Filho
4	5		8	
Marina Ruy Barbosa	Marcello Melo Jr.		Carlota Portella	

Running order

Samba
Couple	Judges' score				Total score	Average score				Dance total	Final total	Result
Couple	1	2	3	4	Total score	A	T	S	V	Dance total	Final total	Result
Couple	5	6	7	8	Total score	A	T	S	V	Dance total	Final total	Result
Mariana & Marcus	9.9	10	10	10	78.1	9.9	9.5	9.2	9.5	38.1	38.1	N/A
Mariana & Marcus	9.8	9.4	9.5	9.5	78.1	9.9	9.5	9.2	9.5	38.1	38.1	N/A
Arthur & Mayara	9.8	9.5	10	10	77.5	9.9	9.4	9.2	9.9	38.4	38.4	N/A
Arthur & Mayara	10	9.4	9.3	9.5	77.5	9.9	9.4	9.2	9.9	38.4	38.4	N/A
Viviane & Marcelo	10	10	10	10	80.0	10	10	9.6	9.9	39.5	39.5	N/A
Viviane & Marcelo	10	10	10	10	80.0	10	10	9.6	9.9	39.5	39.5	N/A

Tango
Couple	Judges' score				Total score	Average score				Dance total	Final total	Result
Couple	1	2	3	4	Total score	A	T	S	V	Dance total	Final total	Result
Couple	5	6	7	8	Total score	A	T	S	V	Dance total	Final total	Result
Mariana & Marcus	10	10	9.8	9.9	78.0	9.9	9.5	9.4	9.6	38.4	76.5	Third place
Mariana & Marcus	9.9	9.5	9.4	9.5	78.0	9.9	9.5	9.4	9.6	38.4	76.5	Third place
Arthur & Mayara	10	9.9	10	10	77.7	10	9.3	9.4	9.9	38.6	77.0	Runner-up
Arthur & Mayara	10	9.4	9.0	9.4	77.7	10	9.3	9.4	9.9	38.6	77.0	Runner-up
Viviane & Marcelo	10	10	10	10	79.4	10	9.8	9.7	9.9	39.4	78.9	Winner
Viviane & Marcelo	10	9.8	9.8	9.8	79.4	10	9.8	9.7	9.9	39.4	78.9	Winner
