= Viviane Araújo (actress) =

Brazilian model and actress

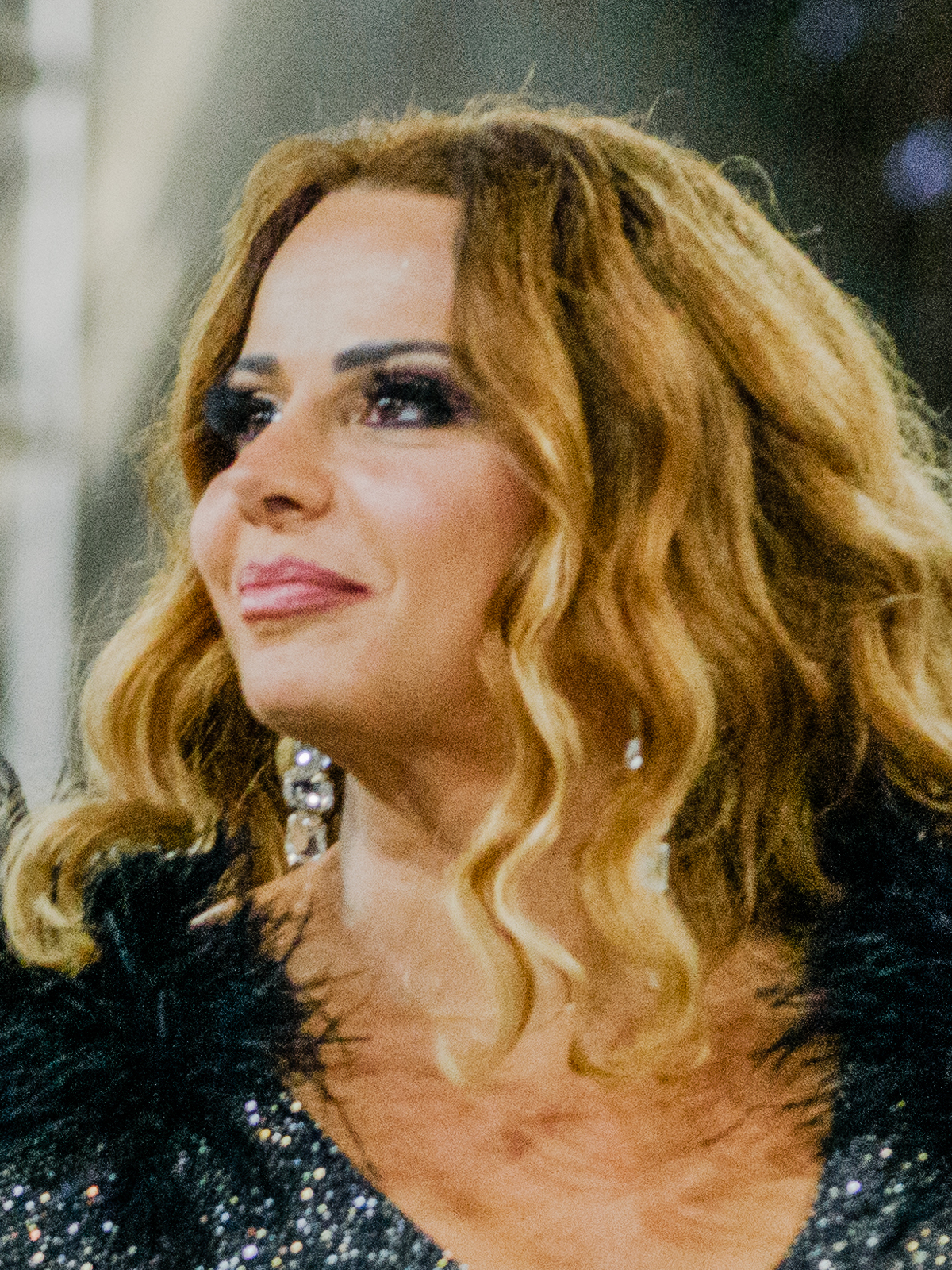
- Araújo in 2023
- Born: Viviane dos Santos Araújo; March 25, 1975 (age 51); Rio de Janeiro, Brazil
- Occupations: Actress, TV personality
- Years active: 1997–present
- Spouses: Belo (m. 1998–2007) Radamés (m. 2007–2017) Guilherme Militão (m. 2021)

Viviane dos Santos Araújo (March 25, 1975 in Rio de Janeiro) is a Brazilian photographic model, actress and reality television personality.

== Career ==
Araújo is best known for being the rainha de bateria of samba schools Mancha Verde in São Paulo and Salgueiro in Rio, and the winner of the fifth season of the Brazilian version of The Farm.

=== Corte of the drums section ===
Corte of the drums section
Year	Title
1997	Império da Tijuca
2002 - 2003	Mocidade Independente de Padre Miguel
2002 - 2010	Os Rouxinóis
2004	União de Jacarepaguá (godmother)
2005 - 2006	Mocidade Independente de Padre Miguel
2005 -	Mancha Verde
2008 -	Acadêmicos do Salgueiro
2013 - 2015	Unidos da Cova da Onça
2014	Consulado

=== Filmography ===
Television
Year	Title	Role
1997	Malhação	Uncredited
1999	Escolinha do Professor Raimundo	Rosinha
2001	Brava Gente	Marcilene
2004	Um Só Coração	Eglantine
2005	Zorra Total	Miss Tetê
2008	Toma Lá, Dá Cá	Samantha
2009–10	Bela, a Feia	Morena
2010	Balada, Baladão	Uncredited
2012	As Brasileiras	Herself (cameo)
2012	A Fazenda	Winner
2014–15	Império	Naná
2015	Dança dos Famosos	Winner
2024	Volta por Cima	Rosana Bacelar
2025	Três Graças	Consuelo

Theatre
Year	Title	Role
2002	Os Monges	
2007	Troca Troca de Casal	Regina
2013	Tamo Junto e Misturado	

=== A Fazenda 5 ===
On May 28, 2012, Viviane Araújo was officially announced by host Britto Junior as one of the sixteen celebrity contestants on the fifth season of A Fazenda, the Brazilian version of reality series The Farm, which aired on Rede Record.

On August 29, 2012, after 93 days, she was crowned the winner of the season, beating actor Felipe Folgosi and drag queen Leo Aquila in the final vote, taking home the R$2 million prize.

== Personal life ==
Araújo married pagode singer Belo (Marcelo Pires Vieira) in 1998. However, after nine years, the couple announced their separation in 2007.

Preceded by Joana Machado	Winner of A Fazenda; A Fazenda 5	Succeeded by Bárbara Evans
