= Joana Treptow =

Brazilian journalist

- Born: December 1, 1993 (age 32); Porto, Portugal
- Occupations: Journalist and TV host

Joana Figueira Treptow, best known as Joana Treptow (born December 1, 1993), is a Portuguese-Brazilian journalist and TV host. She currently works as an anchor for Jornal da Band, on Rede Bandeirantes, and Tarde BandNews, on BandNews TV. She holds a degree in journalism from Faculdades Integradas Hélio Alonso (FACHA), a postgraduate degree in sociology from Municipal University of São Caetano do Sul.

== Biography and career ==
Born in Portugal, she's the daughter of Bruno Marcus Treptow, a Brazilian with German roots, and Ana Sofia Van Der Heijden Fernandes Figueira, a Portuguese of Dutch origin. Her family decided to settle in Brazil when Joana was fifteen, living in Niterói for the next eight years. She studied Journalism at FACHA in 2011 and in 2013 started in the field as an intern at Agéncia EFE. In 2014 she was an intern at GloboNews. In 2015, she began her career at Grupo Bandeirantes de Comunicação as an intern at TV Bandeirantes in Rio de Janeiro, where in 2016 she was hired as a reporter. The following year, she joined the team of professionals at the headquarters of TV Bandeirantes, in São Paulo. It was in the report in São Paulo that she gained prominence in coverage such as the truck drivers' strike, the arrest of former President Lula and the tragedy at Largo do Paissandú. In July 2018, she took over the Café com Jornal desk alongside Luiz Megale.

With the debut of the new programming schedule in August 2019, focused on journalism and interaction, and with the debut of a new daily news program on August 5, 2019, in bulletin format, she took over the editing and presentation of #Informei. In January 2020, she left Café com Jornal, where she was replaced by Michelle Trombelli, to be the weather girl at Jornal da Band.

On September 30, 2025, Joana Treptow announced her departure from Band to join the revamping of Rádio Transamérica (which was renamed TMC), in a project focused on journalism and sports. On January 12, 2026, Joana signed with TV Gazeta to take over the station's main newscast starting March 2, dividing her time between Casper Líbero's channel and TMC.
