= Dança dos Famosos season 3 =

Dança dos Famosos
- Season 3
- Celebrity winner: Robson Caetano
- Professional winner: Ivonete Liberato
- No. of episodes: 12

Release
- Original network: Globo
- Original release: May 14 – August 6, 2006

Season chronology
- ← Previous; Season 2 Next → Season 4

Dança dos Famosos 3 was the third season of the Brazilian reality television show Dança dos Famosos which premiered on May 14, 2006 on Rede Globo.

Olympic athlete Robson Caetano & Ivonete Liberato won the competition over Zorra Total cast member Stepan Nercessian & Michelle Cerbino.

== Couples ==
Celebrity	Notability (known for)	Professional	Status
Daniel Erthal	Malhação cast member	Priscila Maris	Eliminated 1st on May 14, 2006
Roberta Foster	Zorra Total cast member	Ari Paulo	Eliminated 2nd on May 21, 2006
Ricardo Tozzi	Actor	Carol Vieira	Eliminated 3rd on May 28, 2006
Mariana Felício	Big Brother runner-up	Guilherme Abilhôa	Eliminated 4th on June 4, 2006
Oscar Magrini	Actor	Aline Barbosa	Eliminated 5th on June 11, 2006
Guilherme Berenguer	Malhação cast member	Thaiza Adaltro	Eliminated 6th on June 18, 2006
Preta Gil	Singer	Átila Amaral	Withdrew on June 25, 2006
Nívea Maria	Actress	Charles Fernandes	Eliminated 7th on July 2, 2006
Hortência Marcari	Former basketball player	Alex de Carvalho	Eliminated 8th on July 9, 2006
Babi Xavier	Actress	Hélio Faria	Eliminated 9th on July 16, 2006
Stepan Nercessian	Zorra Total cast member	Michelle Cerbino	Runner-up on August 6, 2006
Robson Caetano	Olympic athlete	Ivonete Liberato	Winner on August 6, 2006

== Elimination chart ==
Couple	Place	1	2	3	4	5	6	7	8	9	10	11	12	11+12
Robson & Ivonete	1	44	—	43	—	44	50	50	44	49	98	100	146	246
Stepan & Michelle	2	41	—	49	—	50	49	49	49	45	98	99	148	247
Babi & Helio	3	—	48	—	49	47	50	41	50	48	94			
Hortência & Alex	4	—	49	—	45	50	47	45	45	47				
Nívea & Charles	5	—	49	—	48	50	48	47	40					
Preta Gil & Átila	6	—	47	—	47	47	50	WD						
Guilherme & Thaiza	7	42	—	50	—	46	45							
Oscar & Aline	8	43	—	43	—	43								
Mariana & Guilherme	9	—	45	—	43									
Ricardo & Carol	10	43	—	40										
Roberta & Ari	11	—	40											
Daniel & Priscila	12	40												

Key
Lowest score
Highest score
Eliminated
Bottom two
Withdrew
Runner-up
Winner

== Weekly results ==
A – Artistic jury	T – Technical jury	S – Studio audience	V – Viewers at home
Bottom two		Eliminated	

=== Week 1 ===
Week 1 – Men

- Style: Disco

Aired: May 14, 2006

=== Week 2 ===
Week 1 – Women

- Style: Disco

Aired: May 21, 2006

=== Week 3 ===
Week 2 – Men

- Style: Merengue

Aired: May 28, 2006

=== Week 4 ===
Week 2 – Women

- Style: Merengue

Aired: June 4, 2006

=== Week 5 ===
Top 8

- Style: Bolero

Aired: June 11, 2006

=== Week 6 ===
Top 7

- Style: Forró

Aired: June 18, 2006

=== Week 7 ===
Top 6

- Style: Flamenco

Aired: June 25, 2006

Couple	Judges score	Viewers score	Week total	Final total	Result
Hortência & Alex	45	8.9	53.9	170.0	4th
Stepan & Michelle	49	9.7	58.7	176.5	1st
Nívea & Charles	47	9.0	56.0	173.3	2nd
Preta & Átila					Withdrew
Robson & Ivonete	50	9.8	59.8	173.1	3rd
Babi & Hélio	41	9.7	50.7	166.8	5th

=== Week 8 ===
Top 5

- Style: Rock and Roll

Aired: July 2, 2006

=== Week 9 ===
Top 4

- Style: Lambada

Aired: July 9, 2006

=== Week 10 ===
Top 3

- Styles: Pasodoble & Country

Aired: July 16, 2006

Pasodoble
Couple	Judges score	Viewers score	Dance total	Final total	Result
Robson & Ivonete	48	9.3	57.3	57.3	N/A
Babi & Helio	46	9.4	55.4	55.4	N/A
Stepan & Michelle	49	9.5	58.5	58.5	N/A

Country
Couple	Judges score	Viewers score	Dance total	Final total	Result
Robson & Ivonete	50	9.4	59.4	116.7	2nd
Babi & Helio	48	9.1	57.1	112.5	Eliminated
Stepan & Michelle	49	9.4	58.4	116.9	1st

=== Week 11 ===
Top 2 – Week 1

- Styles: Maxixe & Foxtrot

Aired: July 23, 2006

Maxixe
Couple	Judges score	Viewers score	Dance total	Final total	Result
Robson & Ivonete	50	9.2	59.2	59.2	N/A
Stepan & Michelle	49	9.1	58.1	58.1	N/A

Foxtrot
Couple	Judges score	Viewers score	Dance total	Final total	Result
Robson & Ivonete	50	9.5	59.5	118.7	N/A
Stepan & Michelle	50	9.2	59.2	117.3	N/A

=== Week 12 ===
Top 2 – Week 2

- Styles: Samba, Tango & Instant dance (Disco – Robson; Rock and Roll – Stepan)

Aired: August 6, 2006

Samba
Couple	Judges score	Viewers score	Dance total	Final total	Result
Robson & Ivonete	50	9.6	59.6	178.3	N/A
Stepan & Michelle	50	9.4	59.4	176.7	N/A

Tango
Couple	Judges score	Viewers score	Dance total	Final total	Result
Robson & Ivonete	48	9.2	57.2	235.5	N/A
Stepan & Michelle	49	9.2	58.2	234.9	N/A

Instant dance
Couple	Judges score	Viewers score	Dance total	Final total	Result
Robson & Ivonete	48	9.3	57.3	292.8	Winner
Stepan & Michelle	49	8.9	57.9	292.8	Runner-up
