= Felipe Folgosi =

Brazilian actor

- Folgosi in 2026
- Born: Luis Felipe de Andrade Folgosi; 18 May 1974 (age 52); São Paulo, Brazil
- Occupations: Actor; television presenter; comics writer

Luis Felipe de Andrade Folgosi (born 18 May 1974) is a Brazilian actor, television presenter and comics writer, best known for his roles in telenovelas. In 2012, he was the runner-up of the fifth season of the Brazilian version of The Farm.

== Career ==
=== Filmography ===
Television
Year	Title	Role
1993	Sex Appeal	Julio
1993	Olho no Olho	Aleph
1995	Explode Coração	Vladimir
1998	Corpo Dourado	Lucas
2000	Vidas Cruzadas	Douglas
2003	Jamais Te Esquecerei	Álvaro
2004	Começar de Novo	Rico
2005	Os Ricos Também Choram	Bernardo Domingues
2006	Prova de Amor	Doctor Baltazar Matoso
2007	Caminhos do Coração	Roberto "Beto" Duarte Montenegro
2008	Os Mutantes	Roberto "Beto" Duarte Montenegro
2009	Promessas de Amor	Roberto "Beto" Duarte Montenegro
2010	Louca Família	Nicholas "Nick" Ferreira
2010	Bofe de Elite	Deputy
2011	O Melhor do Brasil	Himself (Guest Star)
2011	Ripley's Believe It or Not!	Himself (Main Host)
2012	A Fazenda 5	Himself (Contestant)
2014	O Negocio	Client of Magali (2 episodes)
2015	Chiquititas	Geraldo Gaspar
