= Domingão do Faustão =

Brazilian TV variety show

- Created by: Detto Costa; Augusto César Vanucci; Boninho; Maurício Nunnes
- Directed by: Jayme Praça; Ulysses Cruz; Adriano Ricco; Gustavo Alves; Cris Gomes; Henrique Matias; Edson Erdmann
- Presented by: Fausto Silva (1989–2021); Tiago Leifert (June 13, 2021)
- Country of origin: Brazil
- Original language: Portuguese
- No. of seasons: 32
- No. of episodes: 1659

Production
- Running time: 170 minutes

Original release
- Network: Rede Globo
- Release: March 26, 1989 – June 13, 2021

Related
- Domingão com Huck

Domingão do Faustão (literally Big Fausto's Big Sunday) was a Brazilian TV show aired every Sunday from 1989 to 2021. Produced by Rede Globo and hosted by Fausto Silva (also known as Faustão), it featured live music performances (usually by the most popular artists in Brazil at the time) as well as special segments, such as the Dança dos Famosos (Brazilian version of Dancing with the Stars) and Dança no Gelo (Dancing on Ice). It was one of the oldest and most famous of Globo's television shows since its first broadcast in 1989.

== History ==
The series was originally slated to be hosted by Augusto "Gugu" Liberato, who had hosted a late-night show on SBT. However, during Carnival in 1988, SBT's owner Silvio Santos personally intervened with Globo's president Roberto Marinho to discourage him from hiring Gugu, allowing Santos to sign a lucrative extension with Gugu that would include prominent roles in SBT's Sunday afternoon lineup. Globo quickly hired Faustao Silva—who had hosted the late-night show Perdidos na Noite on Band—to host the show instead. Domingão do Faustão would premiere on March 26, 1989, featuring a mix of music, dance performances, and interviews. Its main competitor at launch would be SBT's Programa Silvio Santos.

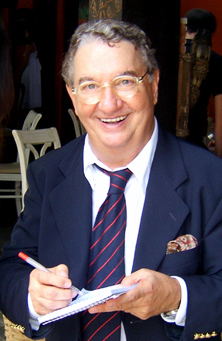
The musician Caçulinha was part of the cast between 1989 and 2009.

In October 1997, Faustão was overtaken in the ratings by another competitor on SBT, Gugu's Domingo Legal; both shows accounted for a total of 60% of Brazilian television viewership on Sundays. By the 2000s, Domingo Legal's viewership began to decline amid a scandal involving Gugu and the PCC.

From 1991 to 1997, Silva also presented a New Year's Eve special for Globo as a spin-off of Domingão, Réveillon do Faustão; it was replaced by the Show da Virada.

In 2008, Domingão celebrated its 1000th episode. In addition to the celebrations, Fausto was congratulated by some personalities, including then president Lula. In 2009, the program celebrated 20 years in the air, promoting the edition Melhores do Ano de 2008 (which was intentionally delayed). In December of that year, the resignation of some members of the cast and production was announced. Among them, Adriana Colin (merchandising), Caçulinha (literally little young brother - musical director) and Lucimara Parisi (director).

On January 25, 2021, the columnist Lauro Jardim announced that the show would be ending in December, after Silva declined an offer by Globo for him to move to a new show on Thursday nights.

On June 13, 2021, Silva missed an episode of Domingão for the first time for medical reasons (citing a urinary tract infection), with Tiago Leifert filling in as guest host. On June 17, Globo announced that Silva had left the network after 35 years, and that Domingão would be succeeded by a new program hosted by Luciano Huck. Leifert would remain as an interim host. The following month, Silva signed with Band to host a new nightly program on the network.

It was later announced that the Domingão do Faustão title would not be used for this transitional period (thus making the June 13 broadcast its final episode), with the remainder of Super Dança dos Famosos being broadcast as a standalone program with Leifert as host. The program's official replacement, Domingão com Huck, premiered on September 5; the new show carries over segments that were featured on Domingão do Faustão (such as Dança dos Famosos and Show dos Famosos), while also featuring segments that were seen on his Saturday show Caldeirão do Huck (such as Quem quer ser um milionário? and The Wall).

== Regular segments ==
=== Dança dos Famosos ===
One of the two Brazilian versions of the British competition series Strictly Come Dancing (the other being Record's Dancing Brasil, which is licensed specifically from its U.S. adaptation Dancing with the Stars), the show pairs a number of celebrities with professional ballroom dancers.

Season Chronology

Season	Celebrity Honor Places			Contestants
Season	Winner	Runner-Up	Third Place	Contestants
1 (2005)	Karina Bacchi	Alexandre Barillari	Daniela Escobar	6
2 (2006)	Juliana Didone	Kelly Key	Pedro Bismark	6
3 (2006)	Robson Caetano	Stepan Nercessian	Babi Xavier	12
4 (2007)	Rodrigo Hilbert	Elaine Mickely	Carmo Dalla Vecchia	12
5 (2008)	Christiane Torloni	Rafael Almeida	Samara Felippo	10
6 (2009)	Paola Oliveira	Leandro Hassum	Jonatas Faro	10
7 (2010)	Fernanda Souza	Sheron Menezzes	Andre Arteche	12
8 (2011)	Miguel Roncato	Nelson Freitas	Odilon Wagner	12
9 (2012)	Rodrigo Simas	Cláudia Ohana	Bárbara Paz	12
10 (2013)	Carol Castro	Bruna Marquezine	Tiago Abravanel	12
11 (2014)	Marcello Melo Jr.	Paloma Bernardi	Juliana Paiva	12
12 (2015)	Viviane Araújo	Arthur Aguiar	Mariana Santos	12
13 (2016)	Felipe Simas	Sophia Abrahão	Rainer Cadete	12
14 (2017)	Maria Joana	Lucas Veloso	Nicolas Prattes	12
15 (2018)	Léo Jaime	Érika Januza	Dani Calabresa	12

=== Show dos Famosos ===
Based on the Spanish format Your Face Sounds Familiar, the series features celebrities performing as randomly-selected musicians.

=== Melhores do Ano ===
Melhores do Ano is an event promoted by the program to reward the best artists of the year.

2015 edition

Best Actor of Telenovela	Best Actress of Telenovela
Alexandre Nero - (A Regra do Jogo); Rafael Cardoso - (Além do Tempo); Rodrigo Lombardi - (Verdades Secretas)	Giovanna Antonelli - (A Regra do Jogo); Alinne Moraes - (Além do Tempo); Drica Moraes - (Verdades Secretas)
Best Supporting Actor	Best Supporting Actress
Rainer Cadete - (Verdades Secretas); Juliano Cazarré - (A Regra do Jogo); Tonico Pereira - (A Regra do Jogo)	Grazi Massafera - (Verdades Secretas); Bruna Linzmeyer - (A Regra do Jogo); Cássia Kis - (A Regra do Jogo)
Best Revelation Actor	Best Revelation Actress
Rafael Vitti - (Malhação); Gabriel Leone - (Verdades Secretas); Mauricio Destri - (I Love Paraisópolis)	Isabella Santoni - (Malhação); Agatha Moreira - (Verdades Secretas); Camila Queiroz - (Verdades Secretas)
Best Actor of Series	Best Actress of Series
Vladimir Brichta - (Tapas & Beijos); Enrique Díaz - (Felizes para Sempre?); Lázaro Ramos - (Mister Brau)	Paolla Oliveira - (Felizes para Sempre?); Fernanda Torres - (Tapas & Beijos); Taís Araújo - (Mister Brau)
Comedy	Best Children Actress/Actor
Rodrigo Sant'Anna - (Zorra); Leandro Hassum - (Chapa Quente); Marcelo Adnet - (Tá no Ar)	Mel Maia - (Além do Tempo); João Gabriel D'Aleluia - (Além do Tempo); Sabrina Nonata - (Babilônia)
Best Male Singer	Best Female Singer
Luan Santana; Lucas Lucco; Thiaguinho	Anitta; Claudia Leitte; Ivete Sangalo
Song of Year	Best Journalism
"Hoje" - (Ludmilla); "A Noite" - (Tiê); "Escreve Aí" - (Luan Santana)	Renata Vasconcellos - (Jornal Nacional); Maria Júlia Coutinho - (Jornal Nacional); Sandra Annenberg - (Jornal Hoje)

== Impact ==
Fausto Silva, host of the Domingão, in 2011.

=== Ratings ===
Domingão debuted with a central objective: to surpass the audience of the popular Programa Silvio Santos (SBT). According to IBOPE, some affiliated stations SBT recorded 60 rating points during program airing, an easy win for Globo. Soon after the premiere, Domingão, broadcast during prime time on Sunday, between 4:00 pm and 19:00 pm, scored 36 points average, compared to 20 for Silvio Santos in São Paulo. In Rio de Janeiro, it was 36 points for 'Domingão' versus 16 points for TV Manchete.

The program remained leader for 8 consecutive years (which made the media call Fausto the King of Sundays), until the SBT launched Domingo Legal, a similar program presented by Augusto Liberato, who quickly became popular and took over the leadership of IBOPE ratings. The loss of ratings forced Fausto and his production team to appeal to alternatives, such as the controversial segment Sushi Erótico (Erotic Sushi). However, the program still lost more audience and popularity, and Domingo Legal continued to grow. However, some years later, the rival program would lose popularity, after displaying a false report in which alleged members of the PCC threatened the death of some of Brazil's media personalities. Later, Fausto again lead the IBOPE Ratings.

Fausto continued to lead the public by the end of the 2000s (even considering the boom of Rede TV! which did not affect Domingão directly). However, in 2010, Fausto returned to facing problems with the audience. Gugu, who moved to TV Record a year earlier, began broadcasting its program in the new station simultaneously, and performed well in the ratings, and beat Fausto several times.

In 2011, Domingão recorded its worst audience: 10 points on average, according to IBOPE Media Information. At some times of the day, Fausto came in third place, surpassed by Gugu (Record) and Eliana (SBT).

Year	Viewers (in points)
2000	21.0
2001	—
2002	—
2003	—
2004	—
2005	—
2006	22.4
2007	19.2
2008	18.3
2009	17.2
2010	17.6
2011	17.1
2012	—
2013	—
2014	—
