= Dança dos Famosos season 15 =

Dança dos Famosos
- Season 15
- Celebrity winner: Léo Jaime
- Professional winner: Larissa Parison
- No. of episodes: 17

Release
- Original network: Globo
- Original release: 12 August – 16 December 2018

Season chronology
- ← Previous; Season 14 Next → Season 16

Dança dos Famosos 2018 was the fifteenth season of the Brazilian reality television show Dança dos Famosos which premiered on 12 August 2018, with the competitive live shows beginning on the following week on 19 August 2018 at 7:30 / 6:30 p.m. (BRT / AMT) on Rede Globo.

On 16 December 2018, singer and actor Léo Jaime & Larissa Parison won the competition over actress Érika Januza & Elias Ustariz and comedian Dani Calabresa & Reginaldo Sama, who took 2nd and 3rd place respectively.

== Couples ==
Celebrity	Notability (known for)	Professional	Status	Ref.
Anderson Tomazini	Actor	Juliana Acacio	Withdrew on 30 September 2018	
Mariana Ferrão; Returned on 4 November	Journalist	Ricardo Espeschit	Withdrew on 7 October 2018	
Fiuk	Singer & actor	Erica Rodrigues	Withdrew on 14 October 2018	
Sérgio Malheiros; Returned on 4 November	Actor	Suellem Morimoto; Natacha Horana (week 1–4)	Eliminated 1st on 14 October 2018	
Deborah Evelyn	Actress	Rodrigo Oliveira	Eliminated 2nd on 21 October 2018	
Bia Arantes; Returned on 4 November	Actress	Jefferson Bilisco	Eliminated 3rd on 21 October 2018	
Nando Rodrigues	Actor	Tati Scarletti	Eliminated 4th on 18 November 2018	
Sérgio Malheiros	Actor	Suellem Morimoto	Eliminated 5th on 18 November 2018	
Pâmela Tomé	Actress	Marcus Lobo	Eliminated 6th on 18 November 2018	
Mariana Ferrão	Journalist	Ricardo Espeschit	Eliminated 7th on 25 November 2018	
Danton Mello	Actor	Brennda Martins	Eliminated 8th on 2 December 2018	
Bia Arantes	Actress	Jefferson Bilisco	Eliminated 9th on 2 December 2018	
Dani Calabresa	Comedian	Reginaldo Sama	Third place on 16 December 2018	
Érika Januza	Actress	Elias Ustariz	Runner-up on 16 December 2018	
Léo Jaime	Singer & actor	Larissa Parison	Winner on 16 December 2018	

== Elimination chart ==
Couple	Place	1	2	3	4	5	6	7	8	9	10	11	12	13	14	15	16
Léo & Larissa	1	47.6	—	47.4	—	48.4	—	48.5	—	48.1	—	—	49.5	—	50.0	49.6	159.8
Érika & Elias	2	—	47.1	—	48.1	—	48.8	—	47.8	—	48.4	—	49.3	—	49.8	50.0	159.1
Dani & Reginaldo	3	—	46.7	—	47.4	—	47.4	—	48.0	—	48.7	—	49.3	—	49.9	49.4	159.3
Bia & Jefferson	4	—	47.1	—	46.5	—	47.5	—	48.9	—	48.4	3/14	—	49.8	49.5	49.4	
Danton & Brennda	5	47.8	—	48.0	—	47.7	—	48.0	—	49.0	—	—	—	50.0	49.4	49.3	
Mariana & Ricardo	6	—	47.5	—	48.5	—	48.5	—	—			6/14	—	49.8	49.4		
Pâmela & Marcus	7	—	47.5	—	46.8	—	48.6	—	48.0	—	48.7	—	—	49.6			
Sérgio & Suellem	8	47.2	—	47.5	—	47.6	—	48.3	—	48.2		3/14	—	49.6			
Nando & Tati	9	47.5	—	47.7	—	48.0	—	47.2	—	48.2	—	—	48.9	—			
Deborah & Rodrigo	10	—	46.4	—	46.3	—	46.9	—	48.1	—	48.5	2/14					
Fiuk & Erica	11	46.9	—	47.6	—	47.2	—	46.4	—	—		0/14					
Anderson & Juliana	12	46.7	—	47.4	—	46.8	—	—				0/14					

Key
Lowest score
Highest score
Eliminated
Saved last
Dance-off
Withdrew
Third place
Runner-up
Winner

== Weekly results ==
A – Artistic jury	T – Technical jury	S – Studio audience	V – Viewers at home
Saved last		Eliminated	

=== Week 1 ===
Presentation of the Celebrities

Aired: 12 August 2018

=== Week 2 ===
Week 1 – Men

- Style: Disco

Aired: 19 August 2018

Artistic judges			Technical judges	
1	2	3	4	5
Artur Xexéo	Juliana Paiva	Cauã Reymond	Inês Bogéa	Anselmo Zolla

Running order

Couple	Judges' score					Total score	Public score		Week total	Final total	Result
Couple	1	2	3	4	5	Total score	S	V	Week total	Final total	Result
Sérgio & Natacha	9.8	10	10	8.7	8.7	47.2	8.7	—	55.9	—	4th
Fiuk & Erica	9.8	10	10	8.6	8.5	46.9	8.5	—	55.4	—	5th
Léo & Larissa	10	10	10	8.8	8.8	47.6	9.4	—	57.0	—	3rd
Nando & Tati	10	10	10	8.8	8.7	47.5	9.6	—	57.1	—	2nd
Anderson & Juliana	9.8	9.9	9.9	8.6	8.5	46.7	8.7	—	55.4	—	5th
Danton & Brennda	10	10	10	8.9	8.9	47.8	9.7	—	57.5	—	1st

=== Week 3 ===
Week 1 – Women

- Style: Disco

Aired: August 26, 2018
(pre-taped on Saturday, 18 August)

Artistic judges			Technical judges	
1	2	3	4	5
Luis Maluf	Angélica	Odilon Wagner	Inês Bogéa	Anselmo Zolla

Running order

Couple	Judges' score					Total score	Public score		Week total	Final total	Result
Couple	1	2	3	4	5	Total score	S	V	Week total	Final total	Result
Érika & Elias	10	10	10	8.6	8.5	47.1	9.0	—	56.1	—	4th
Dani & Reginaldo	9.5	10	10	8.5	8.7	46.7	9.0	—	55.7	—	5th
Deborah & Rodrigo	9.5	9.9	9.8	8.6	8.6	46.4	9.0	—	55.4	—	6th
Bia & Jefferson	10	10	9.8	8.7	8.5	47.0	9.5	—	56.5	—	3rd
Mariana & Ricardo	10	10	10	8.8	8.7	47.5	9.7	—	57.2	—	2nd
Pâmela & Marcus	10	10	10	8.7	8.8	47.5	9.9	—	57.4	—	1st

=== Week 4 ===
Week 2 – Men

- Style: Forró

Aired: 2 September 2018

Artistic judges			Technical judges	
1	2	3	4	5
Fernanda Motta	Marcos Pasquim	Taís Araújo	Ciro Barcelos	Suely Machado

Running order

Couple	Judges' score					Total score	Public score		Week total	Final total	Result
Couple	1	2	3	4	5	Total score	S	V	Week total	Final total	Result
Léo & Larissa	10	10	10	8.7	8.7	47.4	9.0	—	56.4	113.4	3rd
Sérgio & Natacha	10	10	10	8.7	8.8	47.5	9.2	—	56.7	112.6	4th
Anderson & Juliana	10	10	10	8.7	8.7	47.4	9.2	—	56.6	112.0	6th
Danton & Brennda	10	10	10	8.9	9.1	48.0	9.2	—	57.2	114.7	1st
Fiuk & Erica	10	10	10	8.8	8.8	47.6	9.1	—	56.7	112.1	5th
Nando & Tati	10	10	10	8.8	8.9	47.7	9.5	—	57.2	114.3	2nd

=== Week 5 ===
Week 2 – Women

- Style: Forró

Aired: 9 September 2018
(pre-taped on Saturday, 1 September)

Artistic judges			Technical judges	
1	2	3	4	5
Hugo Gloss	Juliana Alves	Flávio Canto	Suely Machado	Ciro Barcelos

Running order

Couple	Judges' score					Total score	Public score		Week total	Final total	Result
Couple	1	2	3	4	5	Total score	S	V	Week total	Final total	Result
Pâmela & Marcus	9.9	9.8	9.7	8.7	8.7	46.8	8.8	—	55.6	113.0	3rd
Bia & Jefferson	9.9	9.9	9.6	8.6	8.5	46.5	9.2	—	55.7	112.2	5th
Dani & Reginaldo	10	10	9.7	8.8	8.9	47.4	9.5	—	56.9	112.6	4th
Deborah & Rodrigo	9.8	9.7	9.5	8.6	8.7	46.3	9.4	—	55.7	111.1	6th
Érika & Elias	10	10	9.8	9.2	9.1	48.1	9.7	—	57.8	113.9	2nd
Mariana & Ricardo	10	9.9	9.7	9.2	9.7	48.5	9.0	—	57.5	114.7	1st

=== Week 6 ===
Week 3 – Men

- Style: Funk

Aired: 16 September 2018

Artistic judges			Technical judges	
1	2	3	4	5
Nego do Borel	Letícia Birkheuer	Marcelo Serrado	Carlota Portella	Octávio Nassur

Running order

Couple	Judges' score					Total score	Public score		Week total	Final total	Result
Couple	1	2	3	4	5	Total score	S	V	Week total	Final total	Result
Danton & Brennda	10	10	10	9.0	8.7	47.7	9.6	—	57.3	172.0	2nd
Anderson & Juliana	10	9.8	9.9	8.6	8.5	46.8	9.0	—	55.8	167.8	6th
Nando & Tati	10	10	10	9.0	9.0	48.0	9.8	—	57.8	172.1	1st
Fiuk & Erica	10	10	10	8.6	8.6	47.2	9.2	—	56.4	168.5	5th
Léo & Larissa	10	10	10	9.2	9.2	48.4	9.8	—	58.2	171.6	3rd
Sérgio & Suellem	10	10	10	8.9	8.7	47.6	9.8	—	57.4	170.0	4th

=== Week 7 ===
Week 3 – Women

- Style: Funk

Aired: 23 September 2018

Artistic judges			Technical judges	
1	2	3	4	5
Thiago Pereira	Ludmilla	João Vicente de Castro	Carlota Portella	Octávio Nassur

Running order

Couple	Judges' score					Total score	Public score		Week total	Final total	Result
Couple	1	2	3	4	5	Total score	S	V	Week total	Final total	Result
Mariana & Ricardo	9.9	10	10	9.1	9.5	48.5	9.0	—	57.5	172.2	2nd
Deborah & Rodrigo	9.8	9.8	10	8.5	8.8	46.9	8.8	—	55.7	166.8	6th
Pâmela & Marcus	10	10	10	9.0	9.6	48.6	9.7	—	58.3	171.3	3rd
Dani & Reginaldo	9.9	9.9	10	8.8	8.8	47.4	9.9	—	57.3	169.9	4th
Bia & Jefferson	9.9	9.8	9.9	8.9	9.0	47.5	9.6	—	57.1	169.3	5th
Érika & Elias	10	10	10	9.3	9.5	48.8	9.9	—	58.7	172.6	1st

=== Week 8 ===
Week 4 – Men

- Style: Rock and Roll

Aired: 30 September 2018

Artistic judges			Technical judges	
1	2	3	4	5
Flávio Ricco	Regiane Alves	Fernanda Lima	Helô Gouvêa	Carlinhos de Jesus

Running order

Couple	Judges' score					Total score	Public score		Week total	Final total	Result
Couple	1	2	3	4	5	Total score	S	V	Week total	Final total	Result
Nando & Tati	10	9.9	9.9	8.7	8.7	47.2	9.0	—	56.2	228.3	3rd
Fiuk & Erica	9.9	9.8	9.9	8.4	8.4	46.4	9.4	—	55.8	224.3	5th
Danton & Brennda	10	10	10	9.0	9.0	48.0	9.7	—	57.7	229.7	2nd
Anderson & Juliana								—			Withdrew
Sérgio & Suellem	10	10	10	9.2	9.1	48.3	9.6	—	57.9	227.9	4th
Léo & Larissa	10	10	10	9.3	9.2	48.5	9.7	—	58.2	229.8	1st

=== Week 9 ===
Week 4 – Women

- Style: Rock and Roll

Aired: 7 October 2018

Artistic judges			Technical judges	
1	2	3	4	5
Cristina Padiglione	Marcello Melo Jr.	Sophia Abrahão	Carlinhos de Jesus	Helô Gouvêa

Running order

Couple	Judges' score					Total score	Public score		Week total	Final total	Result
Couple	1	2	3	4	5	Total score	S	V	Week total	Final total	Result
Dani & Reginaldo	9.8	9.9	10	9.0	9.3	48.0	9.5	—	57.5	227.4	4th
Mariana & Ricardo								—			Withdrew
Érika & Elias	9.9	10	10	8.9	9.0	47.8	9.5	—	57.3	229.9	1st
Deborah & Rodrigo	9.6	10	10	9.5	9.0	48.1	9.5	—	57.6	224.4	5th
Pâmela & Marcus	9.6	10	10	8.9	9.5	48.0	9.7	—	57.7	229.0	2nd
Bia & Jefferson	10	10	10	9.4	9.5	48.9	9.9	—	58.8	228.1	3rd

=== Week 10 ===
Week 5 – Men

- Style: Country

Aired: 14 October 2018

Artistic judges			Technical judges	
1	2	3	4	5
Ana Beatriz Barros	Tiago Leifert	Fernanda Souza	Caio Nunes	Claudia Motta

Running order

Couple	Judges' score					Total score	Public score		Week total	Final total	Result (week 1–9)
Couple	1	2	3	4	5	Total score	S	V	Week total	Final total	Result (week 1–9)
Fiuk & Erica								—			Withdrew
Léo & Larissa	10	9.9	9.9	9.1	9.2	48.1	9.0	—	57.1	286.9	2nd
Sérgio & Suellem	9.9	9.9	9.9	9.3	9.2	48.2	9.1	—	57.3	285.2	Dance-off
Nando & Tati	10	9.8	9.9	9.3	9.2	48.2	9.4	—	57.6	285.9	3rd
Danton & Brennda	10	10	10	9.5	9.5	49.0	9.8	—	58.8	288.5	1st

=== Week 11 ===
Week 5 – Women

- Style: Country

Aired: 21 October 2018

Artistic judges			Technical judges	
1	2	3	4	5
Simone Mendes	Dennis Carvalho	Isabella Santoni	Caio Nunes	Claudia Motta

Running order

Couple	Judges' score					Total score	Public score		Week total	Final total	Result (week 2–10)
Couple	1	2	3	4	5	Total score	S	V	Week total	Final total	Result (week 2–10)
Bia & Jefferson	10	10	10	9.2	9.2	48.4	9.2	—	57.6	285.7	Dance-off
Érika & Elias	9.8	10	10	9.2	9.4	48.4	9.4	—	57.8	287.7	1st
Pâmela & Marcus	10	9.9	10	9.3	9.5	48.7	9.7	—	58.4	287.4	2nd
Deborah & Rodrigo	9.8	10	10	9.4	9.3	48.5	9.0	—	57.5	281.9	Dance-off
Dani & Reginaldo	10	10	10	9.3	9.4	48.7	9.8	—	58.5	285.9	3rd

=== Week 12 ===
Dance-off

- Style: Zouk

Aired: 4 November 2018

Artistic judges			Technical judges	
1	2	3	4	5
Adriane Galisteu	Artur Xexéo	Christiane Torloni	Philip Miha	Regina Calil

Running order

Couple	Judges' vote					Jury votes	Public's vote		Week total	Final total	Result
Couple	1	2	3	4	5	Jury votes	S	V	Week total	Final total	Result
Mariana & Ricardo	✔	✔		✔	✔	4	✔	✔	—	6	Advanced
Anderson & Juliana						0			—	0	Eliminated
Deborah & Rodrigo		✔	✔			2			—	2	Eliminated
Sérgio & Suellem			✔	✔	✔	3			—	3	Advanced
Bia & Jefferson	✔					1	✔	✔	—	3	Advanced
Fiuk & Erica						0			—	0	Eliminated

=== Week 13 ===
Group 1

- Style: Salsa

Aired: 11 November 2018

Artistic judges			Technical judges	
1	2	3	4	5
Monique Alfradique	Antônio Calloni	Paolla Oliveira	Marcio Rongetti	Inês Bogéa

Running order

Couple	Judges' score					Total score	Public score		Week total	Final total	Result (week 12–13)
Couple	1	2	3	4	5	Total score	S	V	Week total	Final total	Result (week 12–13)
Érika & Elias	10	10	9.9	9.7	9.7	49.3	9.6	9.7	—	68.6	6th
Nando & Tati	9.9	9.9	9.9	9.6	9.6	48.9	9.2	9.1	—	67.2	Eliminated
Dani & Reginaldo	10	10	10	9.6	9.7	49.3	9.8	9.7	—	68.8	5th
Léo & Larissa	9.9	9.9	10	9.9	9.8	49.5	9.8	9.7	—	69.0	4th

=== Week 14 ===
Group 2

- Style: Salsa

Aired: 18 November 2018

Artistic judges			Technical judges	
1	2	3	4	5
Joyce Pascowitch	Felipe Simas	Vitória Strada	Marcio Rongetti	Inês Bogéa

Running order

Couple	Judges' score					Total score	Public score		Week total	Final total	Result (week 12–13)
Couple	1	2	3	4	5	Total score	S	V	Week total	Final total	Result (week 12–13)
Pâmela & Marcus	10	10	10	9.8	9.8	49.6	9.2	9.6	—	68.4	Eliminated
Mariana & Ricardo	10	10	10	9.9	9.9	49.8	9.6	9.8	—	69.2	3rd
Sérgio & Suellem	10	10	10	9.8	9.8	49.6	9.1	9.6	—	68.3	Eliminated
Bia & Jefferson	10	10	10	9.9	9.9	49.8	9.7	9.8	—	69.3	2nd
Danton & Brennda	10	10	10	10	10	50.0	9.8	9.9	—	69.7	1st

=== Week 15 ===
Top 6

- Style: Pasodoble

Aired: 25 November 2018

Artistic judges			Technical judges	
1	2	3	4	5
Sônia Racy	Nicolas Prattes	Viviane Araújo	J.C. Violla	Márcia Jaqueline

Running order

Couple	Judges' score					Total score	Public score		Week total	Final total	Result
Couple	1	2	3	4	5	Total score	S	V	Week total	Final total	Result
Danton & Brennda	9.9	10	10	9.7	9.8	49.4	9.7	9.8	—	68.9	5th
Bia & Jefferson	10	10	10	9.7	9.8	49.5	9.8	9.8	—	69.1	3rd
Mariana & Ricardo	9.9	10	10	9.7	9.8	49.4	9.5	9.8	—	68.8	Eliminated
Léo & Larissa	10	10	10	10	10	50.0	9.7	9.7	—	69.4	2nd
Érika & Elias	9.9	10	10	10	9.9	49.8	9.6	9.7	—	69.1	3rd
Dani & Reginaldo	9.9	10	10	10	10	49.9	9.8	9.8	—	69.5	1st

=== Week 16 ===
Top 5 – Semifinals

- Style: Samba

Aired: 2 December 2018

Artistic judges			Technical judges	
1	2	3	4	5
Cris Vianna	Joaquim Lopes	Carol Castro	Renato Vieira	Ana Botafogo

Running order

Couple	Judges' score					Total score	Public score		Week total	Final total	Result
Couple	1	2	3	4	5	Total score	S	V	Week total	Final total	Result
Dani & Reginaldo	10	10	10	9.6	9.8	49.4	9.6	9.8	68.8	138.3	3rd (finalist)
Léo & Larissa	10	10	10	9.7	9.9	49.6	9.8	9.6	69.0	138.4	2nd (finalist)
Érika & Elias	10	10	10	10	10	50.0	9.8	9.8	69.6	138.7	1st (finalist)
Danton & Brennda	10	10	10	9.5	9.8	49.3	9.5	9.8	68.6	137.5	Eliminated
Bia & Jefferson	10	10	10	9.7	9.7	49.4	9.8	9.9	69.1	138.2	Eliminated

=== Week 17 ===
Top 3 – Finals

- Styles: Tango & Waltz

Aired: 16 December 2018

Artistic judges			Technical judges	
1	2	3	6	7
Camila Queiroz	Maria Joana	Mariana Ximenes	Carlinhos de Jesus	Maria Pia Finócchio
4	5		8	
Otaviano Costa	Artur Xexéo		Jarbas Homem de Mello	

Running order

Tango
Couple	Judges' score				Total score	Public score		Dance total	Final total	Result
Couple	1	2	3	4	Total score	S	V	Dance total	Final total	Result
Couple	5	6	7	8	Total score	S	V	Dance total	Final total	Result
Érika & Elias	10	10	10	10	79.4	9.5	9.9	98.8	—	N/A
Érika & Elias	10	9.8	9.8	9.8	79.4	9.5	9.9	98.8	—	N/A
Dani & Reginaldo	10	10	10	10	79.7	9.6	9.8	99.1	—	N/A
Dani & Reginaldo	10	9.9	9.9	9.9	79.7	9.6	9.8	99.1	—	N/A
Léo & Larissa	10	10	10	10	79.9	9.6	9.8	99.3	—	N/A
Léo & Larissa	9.9	10	10	10	79.9	9.6	9.8	99.3	—	N/A

Waltz
Couple	Judges' score				Total score	Public score		Dance total	Final total	Result
Couple	1	2	3	4	Total score	S	V	Dance total	Final total	Result
Couple	5	6	7	8	Total score	S	V	Dance total	Final total	Result
Érika & Elias	10	10	10	10	79.7	9.8	9.9	99.4	198.2	Runner-up
Érika & Elias	10	9.9	9.9	9.9	79.7	9.8	9.9	99.4	198.2	Runner-up
Dani & Reginaldo	10	10	10	10	79.6	9.4	9.7	98.7	197.8	Third place
Dani & Reginaldo	9.9	9.9	9.9	9.9	79.6	9.4	9.7	98.7	197.8	Third place
Léo & Larissa	10	9.9	10	10	79.9	9.6	9.8	99.3	198.6	Winner
Léo & Larissa	10	10	10	10	79.9	9.6	9.8	99.3	198.6	Winner
