= Dança dos Famosos season 16 =

Dança dos Famosos
- Season 16
- Celebrity winner: Kaysar Dadour
- Professional winner: Mayara Araújo
- No. of episodes: 17

Release
- Original network: TV Globo
- Original release: 25 August – 22 December 2019

Season chronology
- ← Previous; Season 15 Next → Season 17

Dança dos Famosos 2019 was the sixteenth season of the Brazilian reality television show Dança dos Famosos which premiered on 25 August 2019 at 7:30 / 6:30 p.m. (BRT / AMT) on TV Globo, following a cast reveal special that aired on 18 August.

On 22 December 2019, actor Kaysar Dadour & Mayara Araújo won the competition over actress Dandara Mariana & Daniel Norton and actor Jonathan Azevedo & Tati Scarletti, who took 2nd and 3rd place respectively.

== Couples ==
Celebrity	Notability (known for)	Professional	Status	Ref.
Luíza Tomé	Actress	Marcus Lobo	Eliminated 1st on 20 October 2019	
Fernanda Abreu	Singer	Igor Maximiliano	Eliminated 2nd on 20 October 2019	
Regiane Alves Returned on 3 November	Actress	Reginaldo Sama	Eliminated 3rd on 20 October 2019	
Luis Lobianco	Comedian	Francielle Pimenta	Eliminated 4th on 27 October 2019	
Junior Cigano Returned on 3 November	MMA fighter	Ana Paula Guedes	Eliminated 5th on 27 October 2019	
Bruno Montaleone	Actor	Jaque Ciocci	Eliminated 6th on 27 October 2019	
Matheus Abreu	Actor	Larissa Lanes	Eliminated 7th on 17 November 2019	
Giovanna Lancellotti	Actress	Danniel Navarro	Eliminated 8th on 17 November 2019	
Luísa Sonza	Singer	Léo Santos	Eliminated 9th on 24 November 2019	
Junior Cigano	MMA fighter	Ana Paula Guedes	Eliminated 10th on 1 December 2019	
Regiane Alves	Actress	Reginaldo Sama	Eliminated 11th on 8 December 2019	
Jonathan Azevedo	Actor	Tati Scarletti	Third place on 22 December 2019	
Dandara Mariana	Actress	Daniel Norton	Runner-up on 22 December 2019	
Kaysar Dadour	Actor	Mayara Araújo	Winner on 22 December 2019	

== Elimination chart ==
Couple	Place	1	2	3	4	5	6	7	8	9	10	11	12	13	14	15	16	17
Kaysar & Mayara	1	—N/a	47.9	—N/a	48.3	—N/a	49.8	—N/a	49.7	—N/a	49.8	—N/a	49.9	—N/a	49.9	49.3	49.5	159.8
Dandara & Daniel	2	48.3	—N/a	48.4	—N/a	49.6	—N/a	49.8	—N/a	49.8	—N/a	—N/a	49.8	—N/a	49.9	50.0	49.8	160.0
Jonathan & Tati	3	—N/a	48.3	—N/a	48.6	—N/a	49.3	—N/a	49.8	—N/a	49.9	—N/a	—N/a	49.7	49.6	49.6	50.0	159.1
Regiane & Reginaldo	4	48.0	—N/a	48.6	—N/a	48.9	—N/a	49.6	—N/a	49.7		7/14	49.5	—	49.4	49.6	49.5	
Cigano & Ana Paula	5	—N/a	48.4	—N/a	48.3	—N/a	49.1	—N/a	49.7	—N/a	—	6/14	—N/a	49.7	49.5	49.3		
Luísa & Léo	6	48.2	—N/a	48.8	—N/a	49.3	—N/a	49.5	—N/a	49.8	—N/a	—N/a	—N/a	49.7	49.4			
Giovanna & Danniel	7	48.0	—N/a	48.8	—N/a	49.2	—N/a	49.8	—N/a	49.7	—N/a	—N/a	—N/a	49.5				
Matheus & Larissa	8	—N/a	48.0	—N/a	48.7	—N/a	49.0	—N/a	49.6	—N/a	49.9	—N/a	49.6	—				
Bruno & Jaque	9	—N/a	48.1	—N/a	47.9	—N/a	49.3	—N/a	49.3	—N/a	49.7	0/14						
Luis & Francielle	10	—N/a	47.9	—N/a	48.1	—N/a	48.9	—N/a	—	—N/a	49.6	1/14						
Fernanda & Igor	11	48.2	—N/a	48.0	—N/a	49.0	—N/a	49.8	—N/a	49.8		0/14						
Luiza & Marcus	12	47.5	—N/a	48.0	—N/a	48.4	—N/a	49.5	—N/a	49.7		0/14						

Lowest score
Highest score
Returned
Saved last
Eliminated

Winner
Runner-up
Third place

== Weekly results ==
A – Artistic jury	T – Technical jury	S – Studio audience	V – Viewers at home
Saved last		Eliminated	

=== Week 1 ===
Week 1 – Women

- Style: Disco

Artistic judges			Technical judges	
1	2	3	4	5
Artur Xexéo	Nathalia Dill	Luan Santana	Carlinhos de Jesus	Suely Machado

Running order

Couple	Judges' score					Total score	Public score		Week total	Final total	Result
Couple	1	2	3	4	5	Total score	S	V	Week total	Final total	Result
Giovanna & Danniel	10	10	10	9.0	9.0	48.0	9.9	—	57.9	—	4th
Luiza & Marcus	9.8	9.9	10	8.9	8.9	47.5	9.8	—	57.3	—	6th
Luísa & Léo	10	10	10	9.0	9.2	48.2	9.9	—	58.1	—	2nd
Regiane & Reginaldo	10	10	10	9.0	9.0	48.0	9.9	—	57.9	—	4th
Fernanda & Igor	10	10	10	9.0	9.2	48.2	9.9	—	58.1	—	2nd
Dandara & Daniel	10	10	10	9.0	9.3	48.3	10	—	58.3	—	1st

=== Week 2 ===
Week 1 – Men

- Style: Disco

Artistic judges			Technical judges	
1	2	3	4	5
Deborah Secco	Nelson Freitas	Flávia Alessandra	Carlinhos de Jesus	Suely Machado

Running order

Couple	Judges' score					Total score	Public score		Week total	Final total	Result
Couple	1	2	3	4	5	Total score	S	V	Week total	Final total	Result
Kaysar & Mayara	10	10	10	9.0	8.9	47.9	9.9	—	57.8	—	6th
Matheus & Larissa	9.9	9.9	10	9.0	9.2	48.0	9.9	—	57.9	—	3rd
Cigano & Ana Paula	10	10	10	9.2	9.2	48.4	10	—	58.4	—	1st
Bruno & Jaque	9.9	9.9	10	9.0	9.3	48.1	9.8	—	57.9	—	3rd
Luis & Francielle	10	9.9	10	8.9	9.1	47.9	10	—	57.9	—	3rd
Jonathan & Tati	10	10	10	9.0	9.3	48.3	10	—	58.3	—	2nd

=== Week 3 ===
Week 2 – Women

- Style: Forró

Artistic judges			Technical judges	
1	2	3	4	5
Luis Maluf	Lucy Alves	Deborah Evelyn	Carol Nakamura	Anselmo Zolla

Running order

Couple	Judges' score					Total score	Public score		Week total	Final total	Result
Couple	1	2	3	4	5	Total score	S	V	Week total	Final total	Result
Dandara & Daniel	10	10	10	9.3	9.1	48.4	9.0	—	57.4	115.7	4th
Regiane & Reginaldo	10	10	10	9.4	9.2	48.6	9.3	—	57.9	115.8	3rd
Fernanda & Igor	9.8	10	10	9.2	9.0	48.0	9.0	—	57.0	115.1	5th
Giovanna & Danniel	9.9	10	10	9.6	9.3	48.8	9.7	—	58.5	116.4	2nd
Luiza & Marcus	9.9	9.8	9.9	9.3	9.1	48.0	9.0	—	57.0	114.3	6th
Luísa & Léo	10	10	10	9.6	9.2	48.8	9.6	—	58.4	116.5	1st

=== Week 4 ===
Week 2 – Men

- Style: Forró

Artistic judges			Technical judges	
1	2	3	4	5
Cristina Padiglione	Carol Barcellos	Joaquim Lopes	Carol Nakamura	Anselmo Zolla

Running order

Couple	Judges' score					Total score	Public score		Week total	Final total	Result
Couple	1	2	3	4	5	Total score	S	V	Week total	Final total	Result
Bruno & Jaque	9.8	9.9	10	9.2	9.0	47.9	9.0	—	56.9	114.8	6th
Cigano & Ana Paula	9.7	10	10	9.4	9.2	48.3	9.5	—	57.8	116.2	2nd
Luis & Francielle	9.9	10	10	9.2	9.0	48.1	9.0	—	57.1	115.0	5th
Jonathan & Tati	10	10	10	9.5	9.1	48.6	9.5	—	58.1	116.4	1st
Kaysar & Mayara	9.9	10	10	9.4	9.0	48.3	9.7	—	58.0	115.8	4th
Matheus & Larissa	10	10	9.9	9.5	9.3	48.7	9.5	—	58.2	116.1	3rd

=== Week 5 ===
Week 3 – Women

- Style: Funk

Artistic judges			Technical judges	
1	2	3	4	5
Fernanda Motta	Stepan Nercessian	Luiza Possi	Tainá Grando	Octávio Nassur

Running order

Couple	Judges' score					Total score	Public score		Week total	Final total	Result
Couple	1	2	3	4	5	Total score	S	V	Week total	Final total	Result
Luísa & Léo	10	9.9	10	9.7	9.7	49.3	9.7	—	59.0	175.5	1st
Fernanda & Igor	10	10	10	9.5	9.5	49.0	9.5	—	58.5	173.6	5th
Regiane & Reginaldo	10	10	9.9	9.6	9.4	48.9	9.5	—	58.4	174.2	4th
Luiza & Marcus	9.9	10	9.8	9.4	9.3	48.4	9.2	—	57.6	171.9	6th
Dandara & Daniel	10	10	10	9.8	9.8	49.6	9.8	—	59.4	175.1	3rd
Giovanna & Danniel	10	9.9	9.9	9.7	9.7	49.2	9.6	—	58.8	175.2	2nd

=== Week 6 ===
Week 3 – Men

- Style: Funk

Artistic judges			Technical judges	
1	2	3	4	5
Hugo Gloss	Fernanda Gentil	Raul Gazolla	Tainá Grando	Octávio Nassur

Running order

Couple	Judges' score					Total score	Public score		Week total	Final total	Result
Couple	1	2	3	4	5	Total score	S	V	Week total	Final total	Result
Jonathan & Tati	10	10	10	9.6	9.7	49.3	9.4	—	58.7	175.1	2nd
Luis & Francielle	10	10	10	9.5	9.4	48.9	9.2	—	58.1	173.1	6th
Matheus & Larissa	9.9	10	10	9.7	9.4	49.0	9.5	—	58.5	174.6	4th
Cigano & Ana Paula	10	10	10	9.6	9.5	49.1	9.7	—	58.8	175.0	3rd
Bruno & Jaque	10	10	10	9.6	9.7	49.3	9.8	—	59.1	173.9	5th
Kaysar & Mayara	10	10	10	9.9	9.9	49.8	9.9	—	59.7	175.5	1st

=== Week 7 ===
Week 4 – Women

- Style: Rock

Artistic judges			Technical judges	
1	2	3	4	5
Joyce Pascowitch	Amanda Nunes	Felipe Simas	Ju Valcézia	Ciro Barcelos

Running order

Couple	Judges' score					Total score	Public score		Week total	Final total	Result
Couple	1	2	3	4	5	Total score	S	V	Week total	Final total	Result
Regiane & Reginaldo	10	10	10	9.8	9.8	49.6	9.5	—	59.1	233.3	4th
Luísa & Léo	10	10	10	9.8	9.7	49.5	9.3	—	58.8	234.3	3rd
Giovanna & Danniel	10	10	10	9.9	9.9	49.8	9.6	—	59.4	234.6	2nd
Dandara & Daniel	10	10	10	9.9	9.9	49.8	9.9	—	59.7	234.8	1st
Luiza & Marcus	10	10	10	9.7	9.8	49.5	9.0	—	58.5	230.4	6th
Fernanda & Igor	10	10	10	9.9	9.9	49.8	9.5	—	59.3	232.9	5th

=== Week 8 ===
Week 4 – Men

- Style: Rock

Artistic judges			Technical judges	
1	2	3	4	5
Paulo Miklos	Isabeli Fontana	Walcyr Carrasco	Ju Valcézia	Ciro Barcelos

Running order

Couple	Judges' score					Total score	Public score		Week total	Final total	Result
Couple	1	2	3	4	5	Total score	S	V	Week total	Final total	Result
Matheus & Larissa	10	10	10	9.8	9.8	49.6	9.2	—	58.8	233.4	4th
Bruno & Jaque	10	10	9.9	9.7	9.7	49.3	9.1	—	58.4	232.3	5th
Kaysar & Mayara	10	10	10	9.9	9.8	49.7	9.6	—	59.3	234.8	1st
Luis & Francielle	Did not perform due to an injury							—	00.0	173.1	6th
Jonathan & Tati	10	10	10	9.9	9.9	49.8	9.5	—	59.3	234.4	2nd
Cigano & Ana Paula	10	10	10	9.8	9.9	49.7	9.4	—	59.1	234.1	3rd

=== Week 9 ===
Week 5 – Women

- Style: Country

Artistic judges			Technical judges	
1	2	3	4	5
Flávio Ricco	Simone Mendes	Marcelo Serrado	Nathalia Melo	Thiago Soares

Running order

Couple	Judges' score					Total score	Public score		Week total	Final total	Result (week 1–9)
Couple	1	2	3	4	5	Total score	S	V	Week total	Final total	Result (week 1–9)
Fernanda & Igor	10	10	10	9.9	9.9	49.8	9.0	—	58.8	291.7	Dance-off
Giovanna & Danniel	9.9	9.9	10	9.9	10	49.7	9.4	—	59.1	293.7	3rd
Dandara & Daniel	10	9.9	10	10	9.9	49.8	9.9	—	59.7	294.5	1st
Luiza & Marcus	10	10	10	9.9	9.8	49.7	9.0	—	58.7	289.1	Dance-off
Luísa & Léo	10	10	10	9.9	9.9	49.8	9.8	—	59.6	293.9	2nd
Regiane & Reginaldo	9.9	10	10	9.9	9.9	49.7	9.6	—	59.3	292.6	Dance-off

=== Week 10 ===
Week 5 – Men

- Style: Country

Artistic judges			Technical judges	
1	2	3	4	5
Monique Alfradique	Fábio Porchat	Lília Cabral	Nathalia Melo	Thiago Soares

Running order

Couple	Judges' score					Total score	Public score		Week total	Final total	Result (week 2–10)
Couple	1	2	3	4	5	Total score	S	V	Week total	Final total	Result (week 2–10)
Cigano & Ana Paula	Did not perform due to an infection							—	00.0	234.1	Dance-off
Kaysar & Mayara	10	10	10	9.9	9.9	49.8	9.7	—	59.5	294.3	1st
Luis & Francielle	10	10	10	9.8	9.8	49.6	9.5	—	59.1	232.2	Dance-off
Jonathan & Tati	10	10	10	9.9	10	49.9	9.8	—	59.7	294.1	2nd
Matheus & Larissa	10	10	10	10	9.9	49.9	9.8	—	59.7	293.1	3rd
Bruno & Jaque	10	10	10	9.9	9.8	49.7	9.7	—	59.4	291.7	Dance-off

=== Week 11 ===
Dance-off

- Style: Lambada

Artistic judges			Technical judges	
1	2	3	4	5
Caio Ribeiro	Ellen Rocche	Cauã Reymond	Larissa Parison	Márcio Rongetti

Running order

Couple	Judges' vote					Jury votes	Public's vote		Week total	Final total	Result
Couple	1	2	3	4	5	Jury votes	S	V	Week total	Final total	Result
Regiane & Reginaldo	✔	✔	✔	✔	✔	5	✔	✔	—	7	Advanced
Luis & Francielle				✔		1			—	1	Eliminated
Luiza & Marcus						0			—	0	Eliminated
Bruno & Jaque						0			—	0	Eliminated
Fernanda & Igor						0			—	0	Eliminated
Cigano & Ana Paula	✔	✔	✔		✔	4	✔	✔	—	6	Advanced

=== Week 12 ===
Group 1

- Style: Salsa

Artistic judges			Technical judges	
1	2	3	4	5
Mario Sergio Cortella	Barbara Fialho	Anderson Di Rizzi	Lore Improta	Caio Nunes

Running order

Couple	Judges' score					Total score	Public score		Week total	Final total	Result (week 12–13)
Couple	1	2	3	4	5	Total score	S	V	Week total	Final total	Result (week 12–13)
Dandara & Daniel	10	10	10	9.9	9.9	49.8	9.3	9.9	—	69.0	3rd
Matheus & Larissa	10	10	10	9.8	9.8	49.6	9.2	9.6	—	68.4	Eliminated
Regiane & Reginaldo	10	10	10	9.8	9.8	49.6	9.4	9.7	—	68.7	6th
Kaysar & Mayara	10	10	10	10	9.9	49.9	9.6	9.9	—	69.4	1st

=== Week 13 ===
Group 2

- Style: Salsa

Artistic judges			Technical judges	
1	2	3	4	5
Bruno Cabrerizo	Érika Januza	Tom Cavalcante	Lore Improta	Caio Nunes

Running order

Couple	Judges' score					Total score	Public score		Week total	Final total	Result (week 12–13)
Couple	1	2	3	4	5	Total score	S	V	Week total	Final total	Result (week 12–13)
Jonathan & Tati	10	10	10	9.9	9.8	49.7	9.5	9.7	—	68.9	5th
Giovanna & Danniel	10	10	10	9.8	9.7	49.5	9.4	9.6	—	68.5	Eliminated
Cigano & Ana Paula	10	10	10	9.9	9.8	49.7	9.5	9.8	—	69.0	3rd
Luísa & Léo	10	10	10	9.9	9.8	49.7	9.5	9.9	—	69.1	2nd

=== Week 14 ===
Top 6

- Style: Foxtrot

Artistic judges			Technical judges	
1	2	3	4	5
Ronnie Von	Viviane Araújo	Di Ferrero	Carol Soares	Inês Bogéa

Running order

Couple	Judges' score					Total score	Public score		Week total	Final total	Result
Couple	1	2	3	4	5	Total score	S	V	Week total	Final total	Result
Luísa & Léo	10	9.9	10	9.7	9.8	49.4	9.1	9.9	—	68.4	Eliminated
Kaysar & Mayara	10	10	10	10	9.9	49.9	9.7	9.9	—	69.5	1st
Regiane & Reginaldo	10	10	10	9.7	9.7	49.4	9.5	9.7	—	68.6	4th
Cigano & Ana Paula	10	10	10	9.8	9.7	49.5	9.2	9.8	—	68.5	5th
Dandara & Daniel	10	10	10	10	9.9	49.9	9.7	9.9	—	69.5	1st
Jonathan & Tati	10	10	10	9.8	9.8	49.6	9.7	9.8	—	69.1	3rd

=== Week 15 ===
Top 5

- Style: Pasodoble

Artistic judges			Technical judges	
1	2	3	4	5
André Marques	Carol Castro	Daniel	Suellem Morimoto	J.C. Violla

Running order

Couple	Judges' score					Total score	Public score		Week total	Final total	Result
Couple	1	2	3	4	5	Total score	S	V	Week total	Final total	Result
Kaysar & Mayara	10	10	10	9.8	9.5	49.3	9.5	9.9	68.7	138.2	2nd
Regiane & Reginaldo	10	10	10	9.8	9.8	49.6	9.5	9.7	68.8	137.4	4th
Jonathan & Tati	10	10	10	9.9	9.7	49.6	9.6	9.7	68.9	138.0	3rd
Dandara & Daniel	10	10	10	10	10	50.0	9.5	9.9	69.4	138.9	1st
Cigano & Ana Paula	10	10	10	9.7	9.6	49.3	9.5	9.8	68.6	137.1	Eliminated

=== Week 16 ===
Top 4 – Semifinals

- Style: Samba

Artistic judges			Technical judges	
1	2	3	4	5
Muricy Ramalho	Dani Calabresa	Alcione	Aline Riscado	Marcelo Misailidis

Running order

Couple	Judges' score					Total score	Public score		Week total	Final total	Result
Couple	1	2	3	4	5	Total score	S	V	Week total	Final total	Result
Dandara & Daniel	10	10	10	9.9	9.9	49.8	9.5	9.9	69.2	208.1	1st (Finalist)
Kaysar & Mayara	10	10	10	9.8	9.7	49.5	9.6	9.9	69.0	207.2	3rd (Finalist)
Regiane & Reginaldo	10	10	10	9.8	9.7	49.5	9.4	9.7	68.6	206.0	Eliminated
Jonathan & Tati	10	10	10	10	10	50.0	9.8	9.8	69.6	207.6	2nd (Finalist)

=== Week 17 ===
Top 3 – Finals

- Styles: Waltz & Tango

Artistic judges			Technical judges	
1	2	3	6	7
Artur Xexéo	Vitória Strada	Marcello Melo Jr.	Ana Botafogo	Carlinhos de Jesus
4	5		8	
Léo Jaime	Fafá de Belém		Raquel Guarini	

Running order

Waltz
Couple	Judges' score				Total score	Public score		Dance total	Final total	Result
Couple	1	2	3	4	Total score	S	V	Dance total	Final total	Result
Couple	5	6	7	8	Total score	S	V	Dance total	Final total	Result
Jonathan & Tati	9.9	10	10	10	79.5	9.4	9.8	98.7	—	N/A
Jonathan & Tati	9.9	9.9	9.9	9.9	79.5	9.4	9.8	98.7	—	N/A
Kaysar & Mayara	10	10	10	10	79.8	9.8	9.9	99.5	—	N/A
Kaysar & Mayara	10	9.9	9.9	10	79.8	9.8	9.9	99.5	—	N/A
Dandara & Daniel	10	10	10	10	80.0	9.7	9.9	99.6	—	N/A
Dandara & Daniel	10	10	10	10	80.0	9.7	9.9	99.6	—	N/A

Tango
Couple	Judges' score				Total score	Public score		Dance total	Final total	Result
Couple	1	2	3	4	Total score	S	V	Dance total	Final total	Result
Couple	5	6	7	8	Total score	S	V	Dance total	Final total	Result
Jonathan & Tati	9.9	10	10	10	79.6	9.4	9.7	98.7	197.4	Third place
Jonathan & Tati	10	9.9	9.9	9.9	79.6	9.4	9.7	98.7	197.4	Third place
Kaysar & Mayara	10	10	10	10	80.0	9.9	9.9	99.8	199.3	Winner
Kaysar & Mayara	10	10	10	10	80.0	9.9	9.9	99.8	199.3	Winner
Dandara & Daniel	10	10	10	10	80.0	9.7	9.9	99.6	199.2	Runner-up
Dandara & Daniel	10	10	10	10	80.0	9.7	9.9	99.6	199.2	Runner-up
