= Dança dos Famosos season 14 =

Dança dos Famosos
- Season 14
- Celebrity winner: Maria Joana
- Professional winner: Reginaldo Sama
- No. of episodes: 18

Release
- Original network: Globo
- Original release: 6 August – 17 December 2017

Season chronology
- ← Previous; Season 13 Next → Season 15

Dança dos Famosos 2017 is the fourteenth season of the Brazilian reality television show Dança dos Famosos which premiered on 6 August 2017, with the competitive live shows beginning on the following week on 13 August 2017, at 7:30 / 6:30 p.m. (BRT / AMT) on Rede Globo.

On 17 December 2017, actress Maria Joana & Reginaldo Sama won the competition over comedian Lucas Veloso & Nathalia Melo and actor Nicolas Prattes & Mayara Araújo, who took second and third place respectively.

== Couples ==
Celebrity	Notability (known for)	Professional	Status	Ref.
Baby do Brasil	Singer	Rodrigo Oliveira	Withdrew on 27 August 2017	
Cris Vianna; Returned on 22 October	Actress	Rodrigo Picanço; Rafael Scauri (week 1–8)	Eliminated 1st on 8 October 2017	
Adriane Galisteu; Returned on 22 October	TV host	Marcus Lobo	Eliminated 2nd on 8 October 2017	
Thiago Pereira	Olympic swimmer	Nathália Zannin	Eliminated 3rd on 15 October 2017	
Raul Gazolla	Actor	Pâmela Gomes	Eliminated 4th on 15 October 2017	
Isabella Santoni	Actress	Diego Maia	Eliminated 5th on 12 November 2017	
Rafael Zulu	Actor	Yanca Guimarães	Eliminated 6th on 12 November 2017	
Mariana Xavier	Actress	Léo Santos	Eliminated 7th on 19 November 2017	
Joaquim Lopes	TV host	Tati Scarletti	Eliminated 8th on 26 November 2017	
Cris Vianna	Actress	Rodrigo Picanço	Eliminated 9th on 3 December 2017	
Adriane Galisteu	TV host	Marcus Lobo	Eliminated 10th on 3 December 2017	
Nicolas Prattes	Actor	Mayara Araújo	Third place on 17 December 2017	
Lucas Veloso	Comedian & actor	Nathalia Melo	Runner-up on 17 December 2017	
Maria Joana	Actress	Reginaldo Sama	Winner on 17 December 2017	

== Elimination chart ==
Couple	Place	1	2	3	4	5	6	7	8	9	10	11	12	13	14	15	16	17
Maria & Reginaldo	1	49.5	—	49.9	—	49.7	—	50.0	—	50.0	—	—	—	50.0	50.0	49.7	49.8	159.8
Lucas & Nathalia	2	—	50.0	—	50.0	—	49.5	—	49.8	—	49.8	—	49.9	—	49.6	49.4	49.6	159.0
Nicolas & Mayara	3	—	49.7	—	49.8	—	49.5	—	49.8	—	49.8	—	—	49.4	49.7	49.3	49.7	159.2
Adriane & Marcus	4	49.4	—	49.4	—	48.9	—	50.0	—	50.0		7/14	49.6	—	49.0	49.2	50.0	
Cris & Rodrigo	5	49.1	—	49.4	—	49.2	—	48.8	—	49.9		6/14	—	49.6	49.3	49.9	50.0	
Joaquim & Tati	6	—	49.7	—	49.7	—	49.2	—	49.7	—	49.2	—	—	49.8	48.9	49.4		
Mariana & Léo	7	49.5	—	48.7	—	49.7	—	49.8	—	49.9	—	—	49.4	—	48.9			
Rafael & Yanca	8	—	49.9	—	50.0	—	49.7	—	49.9	—	49.2	—	49.6	—				
Isabella & Diego	9	49.5	—	50.0	—	49.3	—	49.8	—	50.0	—	—	49.4	—				
Raul & Pâmela	10	—	49.8	—	49.7	—	49.6	—	49.6	—	49.1	0/14						
Thiago & Nathália	11	—	49.5	—	48.6	—	48.9	—	49.5	—	49.3	1/14						
Baby & Rodrigo	12	48.7	—	—														

Key
Lowest score
Highest score
Eliminated
Bottom two
Dance-off
Withdrew
Third place
Runner-up
Winner

== Weekly results ==
A – Artistic jury	T – Technical jury	S – Studio audience	V – Viewers at home
Bottom two		Eliminated	

=== Week 1 ===
Presentation of the Celebrities

Aired: August 6, 2017

=== Week 2 ===
Week 1 – Women

- Style: Disco

Aired: August 13, 2017

Artistic judges			Technical judges	
1	2	3	4	5
Sophia Abrahão	Artur Xexéo	Ivete Sangalo	Carlinhos de Jesus	Suely Machado

Running order

Couple	Judges' score					Total score	Average score				Week avg.	Final total	Result
Couple	1	2	3	4	5	Total score	A	T	S	V	Week avg.	Final total	Result
Cris & Rafael	10	9.7	10	9.8	9.6	49.1	9.9	9.7	8.1	—	9.2	—	5th
Mariana & Léo	10	9.9	10	9.7	9.9	49.5	10	9.8	9.6	—	9.8	—	1st
Baby & Rodrigo	10	9.6	10	9.6	9.5	48.7	9.9	9.6	8.1	—	9.2	—	5th
Adriane & Marcus	10	10	10	9.7	9.7	49.4	10	9.7	9.6	—	9.8	—	1st
Isabella & Diego	10	10	10	9.8	9.7	49.5	10	9.8	9.5	—	9.8	—	1st
Maria & Reginaldo	10	9.9	10	9.8	9.8	49.5	10	9.8	9.2	—	9.7	—	4th

=== Week 3 ===
Week 1 – Men

- Style: Disco

Aired: August 20, 2017

Artistic judges			Technical judges	
1	2	3	4	5
Arthur Aguiar	Wanessa Camargo	Bruno Astuto	Totia Meireles	J.C. Violla

Running order

Couple	Judges' score					Total score	Average score				Week avg.	Final total	Result
Couple	1	2	3	4	5	Total score	A	T	S	V	Week avg.	Final total	Result
Raul & Pâmela	10	10	10	9.9	9.9	49.8	10	9.9	9.1	—	9.7	—	3rd
Thiago & Nathália	10	10	10	9.8	9.7	49.5	10	9.8	8.9	—	9.6	—	5th
Lucas & Nathalia	10	10	10	10	10	50.0	10	10	10	—	10	—	1st
Rafael & Yanca	10	10	10	9.9	10	49.9	10	10	9.1	—	9.7	—	3rd
Nicolas & Mayara	10	10	10	9.8	9.9	49.7	10	9.9	8.9	—	9.6	—	5th
Joaquim & Tati	10	10	10	9.9	9.8	49.7	10	9.9	9.6	—	9.8	—	2nd

=== Week 4 ===
Week 2 – Women

- Style: Forró

Aired: August 27, 2017

Artistic judges			Technical judges	
1	2	3	4	5
Solange Couto	Luís Maluf	Sheron Menezzes	Ciro Barcelos	Carolina Kasting

Running order

Couple	Judges' score					Total score	Average score				Week avg.	Final total	Result
Couple	1	2	3	4	5	Total score	A	T	S	V	Week avg.	Final total	Result
Baby & Rodrigo										—			Withdrew
Adriane & Marcus	9.8	10	10	9.8	9.8	49.4	9.9	9.8	8.9	—	9.5	19.3	4th
Maria & Reginaldo	10	10	10	9.9	10	49.9	10	10	9.3	—	9.8	19.5	2nd
Isabella & Diego	10	10	10	10	10	50.0	10	10	9.7	—	9.9	19.7	1st
Cris & Rafael	10	9.9	10	9.7	9.8	49.4	10	9.8	9.4	—	9.7	18.9	5th
Mariana & Léo	9.8	10	10	9.9	9.0	48.7	9.9	9.5	9.7	—	9.7	19.5	2nd

=== Week 5 ===
Week 2 – Men

- Style: Forró

Aired: September 3, 2017

Artistic judges			Technical judges	
1	2	3	4	5
Juliana Paiva	Stepan Nercessian	Lea T	Caio Nunes	Carlota Portella

Running order

Couple	Judges' score					Total score	Average score				Week avg.	Final total	Result
Couple	1	2	3	4	5	Total score	A	T	S	V	Week avg.	Final total	Result
Thiago & Nathália	9.8	9.7	9.8	9.7	9.6	48.6	9.8	9.7	8.9	—	9.5	19.1	6th
Nicolas & Mayara	10	10	10	9.9	9.9	49.8	10	9.9	9.7	—	9.9	19.5	4th
Raul & Pâmela	10	10	10	9.8	9.9	49.7	10	9.9	9.3	—	9.7	19.4	5th
Joaquim & Tati	10	10	10	9.8	9.9	49.7	10	9.9	9.5	—	9.8	19.6	2nd
Rafael & Yanca	10	10	10	10	10	50.0	10	10	9.8	—	9.9	19.6	2nd
Lucas & Nathalia	10	10	10	10	10	50.0	10	10	9.6	—	9.9	19.9	1st

=== Week 6 ===
Week 3 – Women

- Style: Funk

Aired: September 10, 2017

Artistic judges			Technical judges	
1	2	3	4	5
Nego do Borel	Fernanda Souza	Dan Stulbach	Carol Nakamura	Octávio Nassur

Running order

Couple	Judges' score					Total score	Average score				Week avg.	Final total	Result
Couple	1	2	3	4	5	Total score	A	T	S	V	Week avg.	Final total	Result
Isabella & Diego	10	10	9.7	9.9	9.7	49.3	9.9	9.8	9.3	—	9.7	29.4	1st
Adriane & Marcus	10	9.9	9.7	9.7	9.6	48.9	9.9	9.7	8.7	—	9.4	28.7	4th
Mariana & Léo	10	10	10	10	9.7	49.7	10	9.9	9.9	—	9.9	29.4	1st
Maria & Reginaldo	10	10	9.9	10	9.8	49.7	10	9.9	9.9	—	9.9	29.4	1st
Cris & Rafael	10	9.9	9.8	9.9	9.6	49.2	9.9	9.8	9.1	—	9.6	28.5	6th

=== Week 7 ===
Week 3 – Men

- Style: Funk

Aired: September 17, 2017

Artistic judges			Technical judges	
1	2	3	4	5
Suzana Pires	Ancelmo Gois	Luiza Possi	Fly	Arielle Macedo

Running order

Couple	Judges' score					Total score	Average score				Week avg.	Final total	Result
Couple	1	2	3	4	5	Total score	A	T	S	V	Week avg.	Final total	Result
Nicolas & Mayara	10	9.8	10	9.8	9.9	49.5	9.9	9.9	9.4	—	9.7	29.2	4th
Rafael & Yanca	10	9.8	10	9.9	10	49.7	9.9	10	9.3	—	9.7	29.3	2nd
Joaquim & Tati	9.9	9.7	9.8	9.9	9.9	49.2	9.8	9.9	9.6	—	9.8	29.4	2nd
Lucas & Nathalia	9.8	9.9	10	9.9	9.9	49.5	9.9	9.9	9.9	—	9.9	29.8	1st
Raul & Pâmela	10	9.8	10	9.9	9.9	49.6	9.9	9.9	9.4	—	9.7	29.1	5th
Thiago & Nathália	9.7	9.7	9.7	10	9.8	48.9	9.7	9.9	9.4	—	9.7	28.8	6th

=== Week 8 ===
Week 4 – Women

- Style: Rock and Roll

Aired: September 24, 2017

Artistic judges			Technical judges	
1	2	3	4	5
Monique Alfradique	Caio Ribeiro	Regina Duarte	Renato Vieira	Inês Bogéa

Running order

Couple	Judges' score					Total score	Average score				Week avg.	Final total	Result
Couple	1	2	3	4	5	Total score	A	T	S	V	Week avg.	Final total	Result
Mariana & Léo	10	10	10	9.9	9.9	49.8	10	9.9	9.5	—	9.8	39.2	3rd
Cris & Rafael	9.9	9.8	9.8	9.7	9.6	48.8	9.8	9.7	8.9	—	9.5	38.0	5th
Maria & Reginaldo	10	10	10	10	10	50.0	10	10	9.8	—	9.9	39.3	1st
Isabella & Diego	10	10	10	9.9	9.9	49.8	10	9.9	9.7	—	9.9	39.3	1st
Adriane & Marcus	10	10	10	10	10	50.0	10	10	9.8	—	9.9	38.6	4th

=== Week 9 ===
Week 4 – Men

- Style: Rock and Roll

Aired: October 1, 2017

Artistic judges			Technical judges	
1	2	3	4	5
André Marques	Maria Fernanda Cândido	Wolf Maya	Maria Pia Finócchio	Anselmo Zolla

Running order

Couple	Judges' score					Total score	Average score				Week avg.	Final total	Result
Couple	1	2	3	4	5	Total score	A	T	S	V	Week avg.	Final total	Result
Lucas & Nathalia	10	10	10	9.9	9.9	49.8	10	9.9	9.5	—	9.8	39.6	1st
Joaquim & Tati	10	10	9.9	9.9	9.9	49.7	10	9.9	9.7	—	9.9	39.3	2nd
Thiago & Nathália	10	9.9	9.9	9.9	9.8	49.5	9.9	9.9	9.4	—	9.7	38.5	6th
Raul & Pâmela	10	9.9	10	9.9	9.8	49.6	10	9.9	9.4	—	9.7	38.9	5th
Nicolas & Mayara	10	10	10	9.9	9.9	49.8	10	9.9	9.8	—	9.9	39.1	4th
Rafael & Yanca	10	10	9.9	10	10	49.9	10	10	9.8	—	9.9	39.2	3rd

=== Week 10 ===
Week 5 – Women

- Style: Country

Aired: October 8, 2017

Artistic judges			Technical judges	
1	2	3	4	5
Thaila Ayala	Luan Santana	Thalita Rebouças	Marcelo Misailidis	Claudia Motta

Running order

Couple	Judges' score					Total score	Average score				Week avg.	Final total	Result (week 1–9)
Couple	1	2	3	4	5	Total score	A	T	S	V	Week avg.	Final total	Result (week 1–9)
Maria & Reginaldo	10	10	10	10	10	50.0	10	10	9.7	—	9.9	49.2	2nd
Mariana & Léo	10	10	10	10	9.9	49.9	10	10	9.3	—	9.8	49.0	3rd
Cris & Rodrigo	10	10	10	10	9.9	49.9	10	10	9.3	—	9.8	47.8	Dance-off
Adriane & Marcus	10	10	10	10	10	50.0	10	10	9.9	—	10	48.6	Dance-off
Isabella & Diego	10	10	10	10	10	50.0	10	10	9.9	—	10	49.3	1st

=== Week 11 ===
Week 5 – Men

- Style: Country

Aired: October 15, 2017

Artistic judges			Technical judges	
1	2	3	4	5
Marcelo Serrado	Simone	Mario Sergio Cortella	Regina Calil	Pavel Kazarian

Running order

Couple	Judges' score					Total score	Average score				Week avg.	Final total	Result (week 2–10)
Couple	1	2	3	4	5	Total score	A	T	S	V	Week avg.	Final total	Result (week 2–10)
Joaquim & Tati	10	9.8	10	9.7	9.7	49.2	9.9	9.7	9.3	—	9.6	48.9	3rd
Lucas & Nathalia	10	10	10	9.9	9.9	49.8	10	9.9	9.7	—	9.9	49.5	1st
Rafael & Yanca	9.9	9.9	10	9.7	9.7	49.2	9.9	9.7	9.4	—	9.7	48.9	3rd
Nicolas & Mayara	10	10	10	9.9	9.9	49.8	10	9.9	9.9	—	9.9	49.0	2nd
Thiago & Nathália	9.9	9.9	10	9.8	9.7	49.3	9.9	9.8	9.2	—	9.6	48.1	Dance-off
Raul & Pâmela	9.9	9.9	10	9.7	9.6	49.1	9.9	9.7	9.4	—	9.7	48.6	Dance-off

=== Week 12 ===
Dance-off

- Style: Zouk

Aired: October 22, 2017

Artistic judges			Technical judges	
1	2	3	4	5
Fernando Rocha	Giovanna Ewbank	Artur Xexéo	Carlota Portella	Philip Miha

Running order

Couple	Judges' vote					Jury votes	Public vote				Week avg.	Final total	Result
Couple	1	2	3	4	5	Jury votes	A	T	S	V	Week avg.	Final total	Result
Raul & Pâmela						0	—				—	0	Eliminated
Adriane & Marcus	✔	✔	✔	✔	✔	5	—		✔	✔	—	7	Advanced
Thiago & Nathália	✔					1	—				—	1	Eliminated
Cris & Rodrigo		✔	✔	✔	✔	4	—		✔	✔	—	6	Advanced

=== Week 13 ===
Group 1

- Style: Foxtrot

Aired: October 29, 2017

Artistic judges			Technical judges	
1	2	3	4	5
Ana Furtado	Flavio Ricco	Paolla Oliveira	J.C. Violla	Ana Botafogo

Running order

Couple	Judges' score					Total score	Combined score				Week total	Final total	Result (week 12–13)
Couple	1	2	3	4	5	Total score	A	T	S	V	Week total	Final total	Result (week 12–13)
Isabella & Diego	10	10	10	9.7	9.7	49.4	30.0	19.4	9.3	9.6	68.3	—	Eliminated
Rafael & Yanca	10	10	9.9	9.8	9.9	49.6	29.9	19.7	9.4	9.4	68.4	—	Deadlock
Adriane & Marcus	9.9	9.9	9.9	9.9	10	49.6	29.7	19.9	9.7	9.7	69.0	—	4th
Lucas & Nathalia	10	10	10	10	9.9	49.9	30.0	19.9	9.7	10	69.6	—	1st
Mariana & Léo	9.9	9.9	10	9.8	9.8	49.4	29.8	19.6	9.5	9.7	68.6	—	5th

=== Week 14 ===
Group 2

- Style: Foxtrot

Aired: November 12, 2017

Artistic judges			Technical judges	
1	2	3	4	5
Letícia Birkheuer	Rainer Cadete	Débora Nascimento	J.C. Violla	Ana Botafogo

Running order

Couple	Judges' score					Total score	Combined score				Week total	Final total	Result (week 12–13)
Couple	1	2	3	4	5	Total score	A	T	S	V	Week total	Final total	Result (week 12–13)
Nicolas & Mayara	10	10	10	9.7	9.7	49.4	30.0	19.4	9.5	9.7	68.6	—	6th
Cris & Rodrigo	10	10	10	9.8	9.8	49.6	30.0	19.6	9.5	9.3	68.4	—	Deadlock
Joaquim & Tati	10	10	10	9.9	9.9	49.8	30.0	19.8	9.6	9.7	69.1	—	3rd
Maria & Reginaldo	10	10	10	10	10	50.0	30.0	20.0	9.7	9.8	69.5	—	2nd
Deadlock
Cris & Rodrigo	With two couples tied in the combined score total, the result was deadlocked and reverted to the earlier studio audience score. Rafael & Yanca were eliminated as the couple with the lowest score (9.4 against Cris & Rodrigo's 9.5).												7th
Rafael & Yanca	With two couples tied in the combined score total, the result was deadlocked and reverted to the earlier studio audience score. Rafael & Yanca were eliminated as the couple with the lowest score (9.4 against Cris & Rodrigo's 9.5).												Eliminated

=== Week 15 ===
Top 7

- Style: Salsa

Aired: November 19, 2017

Artistic judges			Technical judges	
1	2	3	4	5
Agatha Moreira	Ícaro Silva	Sandra Annenberg	Caio Nunes	Helô Gouvêa

Running order

Couple	Judges' score					Total score	Combined score				Week total	Final total	Result
Couple	1	2	3	4	5	Total score	A	T	S	V	Week total	Final total	Result
Cris & Rodrigo	10	9.8	9.9	9.9	9.7	49.3	29.7	19.6	9.5	9.2	68.0	—	5th
Joaquim & Tati	10	9.8	9.5	9.8	9.8	48.9	29.3	19.6	9.6	9.3	67.8	—	6th
Adriane & Marcus	10	9.7	9.8	9.8	9.7	49.0	29.5	19.5	9.4	9.7	68.1	—	4th
Nicolas & Mayara	10	10	9.8	9.9	10	49.7	29.8	19.9	9.7	9.6	69.0	—	3rd
Mariana & Léo	10	9.9	9.6	9.8	9.6	48.9	29.5	19.4	9.2	9.5	67.6	—	Eliminated
Lucas & Nathalia	10	10	9.8	9.9	9.9	49.6	29.8	19.8	9.8	10	69.4	—	2nd
Maria & Reginaldo	10	10	10	10	10	50.0	30.0	20.0	9.9	9.7	69.6	—	1st

=== Week 16 ===
Top 6

- Style: Pasodoble

Aired: November 26, 2017

Artistic judges			Technical judges	
1	2	3	4	5
Ingrid Guimarães	Marcello Melo Jr.	Tânia Mara	Ciro Barcelos	Inês Bogéa

Running order

Couple	Judges' score					Total score	Combined score				Week total	Final total	Result
Couple	1	2	3	4	5	Total score	A	T	S	V	Week total	Final total	Result
Maria & Reginaldo	10	10	10	9.8	9.9	49.7	30.0	19.7	9.7	9.5	68.9	138.5	1st
Lucas & Nathalia	10	10	10	9.6	9.8	49.4	30.0	19.4	9.8	9.9	69.1	138.5	1st
Adriane & Marcus	9.9	10	10	9.6	9.7	49.2	29.9	19.3	9.8	9.6	68.6	136.8	4th
Nicolas & Mayara	9.9	10	9.9	9.7	9.8	49.3	29.8	19.5	9.8	9.7	68.8	137.8	3rd
Cris & Rodrigo	9.9	10	10	10	10	49.9	29.9	20.0	9.4	9.2	68.5	136.5	5th
Joaquim & Tati	10	10	10	9.7	9.7	49.4	30.0	19.4	9.6	9.6	68.6	136.4	Eliminated

=== Week 17 ===
Top 5 – Semifinals

- Style: Tango

Aired: December 3, 2017

Artistic judges			Technical judges	
1	2	3	4	5
Iara Jereissati	Lázaro Ramos	Fafá de Belém	Anselmo Zolla	Suely Machado

Running order

Couple	Judges' score					Total score	Combined score				Week total	Final total	Result
Couple	1	2	3	4	5	Total score	A	T	S	V	Week total	Final total	Result
Lucas & Nathalia	10	10	9.9	9.8	9.9	49.6	29.9	19.7	9.7	9.9	69.2	207.7	2nd (finalist)
Adriane & Marcus	10	10	10	10	10	50.0	30.0	20.0	9.8	9.6	69.4	206.2	Eliminated
Nicolas & Mayara	10	10	10	9.9	9.8	49.7	30.0	19.7	9.5	9.5	68.7	206.5	3rd (finalist)
Cris & Rodrigo	10	10	10	10	10	50.0	30.0	20.0	9.7	9.6	69.3	205.8	Eliminated
Maria & Reginaldo	10	10	10	9.9	9.9	49.8	30.0	19.8	9.8	9.7	69.3	207.8	1st (finalist)

=== Week 18 ===
Top 3 – Finals

- Styles: Samba & Waltz

Aired: December 17, 2017

Artistic judges			Technical judges	
1	2	3	6	7
Felipe Simas	Marina Ruy Barbosa	Artur Xexéo	Carlinhos de Jesus	Maria Pia Finócchio
4	5		8	
Christiane Torloni	Mario Sergio Cortella		Marcelo Misailidis	

Running order

Samba
Couple	Judges' score				Total score	Combined score				Dance total	Final total	Result
Couple	1	2	3	4	Total score	A	T	S	V	Dance total	Final total	Result
Couple	5	6	7	8	Total score	A	T	S	V	Dance total	Final total	Result
Lucas & Nathalia	9.9	10	9.8	10	79.3	49.7	29.6	9.7	9.9	98.9	98.9	N/A
Lucas & Nathalia	10	9.8	9.9	9.9	79.3	49.7	29.6	9.7	9.9	98.9	98.9	N/A
Nicolas & Mayara	10	10	10	10	79.7	50.0	29.7	9.9	9.4	99.0	99.0	N/A
Nicolas & Mayara	10	9.9	9.9	9.9	79.7	50.0	29.7	9.9	9.4	99.0	99.0	N/A
Maria & Reginaldo	10	10	10	10	79.9	50.0	29.9	9.7	9.6	99.2	99.2	N/A
Maria & Reginaldo	10	9.9	10	10	79.9	50.0	29.9	9.7	9.6	99.2	99.2	N/A

Waltz
Couple	Judges' score				Total score	Combined score				Dance total	Final total	Result
Couple	1	2	3	4	Total score	A	T	S	V	Dance total	Final total	Result
Couple	5	6	7	8	Total score	A	T	S	V	Dance total	Final total	Result
Lucas & Nathalia	10	10	9.9	10	79.7	49.9	29.8	9.8	10	99.5	198.4	Runner-up
Lucas & Nathalia	10	10	10	9.8	79.7	49.9	29.8	9.8	10	99.5	198.4	Runner-up
Nicolas & Mayara	9.9	10	9.9	10	79.5	49.8	29.7	9.7	9.5	98.7	197.7	Third place
Nicolas & Mayara	10	9.9	9.9	9.9	79.5	49.8	29.7	9.7	9.5	98.7	197.7	Third place
Maria & Reginaldo	10	10	10	10	79.9	50.0	29.9	9.9	9.7	99.5	198.7	Winner
Maria & Reginaldo	10	9.9	10	10	79.9	50.0	29.9	9.9	9.7	99.5	198.7	Winner
