= Dança dos Famosos season 13 =

Dança dos Famosos
- Season 13
- Celebrity winner: Felipe Simas
- Professional winner: Carol Agnelo
- No. of episodes: 17

Release
- Original network: Globo
- Original release: August 21 – December 11, 2016

Season chronology
- ← Previous; Season 12 Next → Season 14

Dança dos Famosos 2016 is the thirteenth season of the Brazilian reality television show Dança dos Famosos which premiered on August 21, 2016, with the competitive live shows beginning on the following week on August 28, 2016 at 7:30 p.m./6:30 p.m. (BRT/AMT) on Rede Globo.

On December 11, 2016, actor Felipe Simas & Carol Agnelo won the competition over actress & singer Sophia Abrahão & Rodrigo Oliveira and actor Rainer Cadete & Juliana Valcézia, who took 2nd and 3rd place respectively.

== Couples ==
Celebrity	Known for	Professional	Status	Ref.
Lisandra Souto	Actress	Marcus Lobo	Withdrew on September 18, 2016	
Sidney Magal; Returned on October 23	Singer	Camila Lobo	Eliminated 1st on October 9, 2016	
Marcelinho	Former volleyball player	Yanca Guimarães	Eliminated 2nd on October 9, 2016	
Brenno Leone; Returned on October 23	Malhação cast member	Rachel Drodowsky	Eliminated 3rd on October 9, 2016	
Leona Cavalli; Returned on October 23	Actress	André Uzeda	Eliminated 4th on October 16, 2016	
Valesca	Funk singer	Bruno Franchi	Eliminated 5th on October 16, 2016	
Solange Couto	Actress	Rodrigo Picanço; Áureo Lustosa (week 1–2)	Eliminated 6th on October 30, 2016	
Leticia Lima	Actress	Rafael Scauri	Eliminated 7th on November 6, 2016	
Leona Cavalli	Actress	André Uzeda	Eliminated 8th on November 13, 2016	
Sidney Magal	Singer	Camila Lobo	Eliminated 9th on November 20, 2016	
Nego do Borel	Funk ostentação singer	Juju Fructozo	Eliminated 10th on November 27, 2016	
Brenno Leone	Malhação cast member	Rachel Drodowsky	Eliminated 11th on December 4, 2016	
Rainer Cadete	Actor	Juliana Valcézia	Third place on December 11, 2016	
Sophia Abrahão	Actress & singer	Rodrigo Oliveira	Runner-up on December 11, 2016	
Felipe Simas	Actor	Carol Agnelo	Winner on December 11, 2016	

== Elimination chart ==
Couple	Place	1	2	3	4	5	6	7	8	9	10	11	12	13	14	15	16
Felipe & Carol	1	50.0	—	49.4	—	50.0	—	49.7	—	—	—	49.9	49.6	50.0	50.0	50.0	159.8
Sophia & Rodrigo	2	—	50.0	—	49.9	—	49.6	—	50.0	—	49.4	—	50.0	50.0	49.8	50.0	159.8
Rainer & Juliana	3	49.4	—	49.2	—	49.9	—	49.2	—	—	48.8	—	49.5	47.8	49.6	49.6	158.4
Brenno & Rachel	4	49.4	—	49.4	—	49.8	—	49.2		3/14	48.8	—	49.8	49.7	49.3	49.2	
Nego do Borel & Juju	5	49.9	—	49.7	—	49.8	—	49.0	—	—	—	49.0	49.8	49.3	49.8		
Sidney & Camila	6	46.5	—	48.1	—	49.5	—	48.9		3/14	—	49.0	49.8	47.3			
Leona & André	7	—	48.5	—	47.2	—	47.1	—	48.7	7/14	49.5	—	49.1				
Leticia & Rafael	8	—	48.8	—	47.4	—	48.7	—	49.2	—	—	48.4					
Solange & Rodrigo	9	—	45.1	—	49.1	—	47.9	—	49.1	—	49.3						
Valesca & Bruno	10	—	47.5	—	48.0	—	49.1	—	47.3	1/14							
Marcelinho & Yanca	11	47.4	—	48.7	—	49.6	—	48.8		0/14							
Lisandra & Marcus	12	—	46.6	—	WD					WD							

Key
Lowest score
Highest score
Eliminated
Bottom two
Dance-off
Withdrew
Third place
Runner-up
Winner

== Weekly results ==
A – Artistic jury	T – Technical jury	S – Studio audience	V – Viewers at home
Bottom two		Eliminated	

=== Week 1 ===
Presentation of the Celebrities

Aired: August 21, 2016

=== Week 2 ===
Week 1 – Men

- Style: 2000s Disco

Aired: August 28, 2016

Artistic judges			Technical judges	
1	2	3	4	5
Rafaela Silva	Bruno Astuto	Juliana Paes	J.C. Violla	Ana Botafogo

Running order

Couple	Judges' score					Total score	Average score				Week avg.	Final total	Result
Couple	1	2	3	4	5	Total score	A	T	S	V	Week avg.	Final total	Result
Sidney & Camila	8.5	9.0	10	9.5	9.5	46.5	9.2	9.5	8.5	—	27.2	—	6th
Brenno & Rachel	10	10	10	9.8	9.6	49.4	10	9.7	9.4	—	29.1	—	4th
Marcelinho & Yanca	9.0	9.5	10	9.6	9.3	47.4	9.5	9.5	8.7	—	27.7	—	5th
Rainer & Juliana	10	10	10	9.8	9.6	49.4	10	9.7	9.6	—	29.3	—	3rd
Nego do Borel & Juju	10	10	10	9.9	10	49.9	10	10	9.8	—	29.8	—	1st
Felipe & Carol	10	10	10	10	10	50.0	10	10	9.4	—	29.4	—	2nd

=== Week 3 ===
Week 1 – Women

- Style: 2000s Disco

Aired: September 4, 2016

Artistic judges			Technical judges	
1	2	3	4	5
Luis Maluf	Carol Castro	Bruno Rezende	Fernanda Chamma	Renato Vieira

Running order

Couple	Judges' score					Total score	Average score				Week avg.	Final total	Result
Couple	1	2	3	4	5	Total score	A	T	S	V	Week avg.	Final total	Result
Lisandra & Marcus	9.8	9.0	10	8.8	9.0	46.6	9.6	8.9	8.8	—	27.3	—	5th
Solange & Aúreo	9.8	8.9	9.5	8.4	8.5	45.1	9.4	8.5	8.8	—	26.7	—	6th
Valesca & Bruno	10	9.4	10	8.9	9.2	47.5	9.8	9.1	9.3	—	28.2	—	3rd
Leticia & Rafael	10	10	10	9.3	9.5	48.8	9.9	9.4	9.4	—	28.7	—	2nd
Leona & André	9.9	9.4	9.8	9.6	9.8	48.5	9.7	9.7	8.8	—	28.2	—	3rd
Sophia & Rodrigo	10	10	10	10	10	50.0	10	10	9.9	—	29.9	—	1st

=== Week 4 ===
Week 2 – Men

- Style: Forró

Aired: September 11, 2016
(pre-taped on Saturday, September 3)

Artistic judges			Technical judges	
1	2	3	4	5
Fernando Rocha	Ágatha Bednarczuk	Tiago Leifert	Maria Pia Finócchio	Caio Nunes

Running order

Couple	Judges' score					Total score	Average score				Week avg.	Final total	Result
Couple	1	2	3	4	5	Total score	A	T	S	V	Week avg.	Final total	Result
Rainer & Juliana	10	10	9.7	9.7	9.8	49.2	9.9	9.8	8.9	—	28.6	57.9	4th
Marcelinho & Yanca	9.8	9.9	9.5	9.8	9.7	48.7	9.7	9.8	7.9	—	27.4	55.1	5th
Felipe & Carol	9.9	10	10	9.8	9.7	49.4	10	9.8	9.8	—	29.6	59.0	2nd
Nego do Borel & Juju	9.9	10	9.9	10	9.9	49.7	9.9	10	9.8	—	29.7	59.5	1st
Sidney & Camila	10	9.9	9.5	9.3	9.4	48.1	9.8	9.4	8.5	—	27.7	54.9	6th
Brenno & Rachel	10	10	10	9.7	9.7	49.4	10	9.7	9.6	—	29.3	58.4	3rd

=== Week 5 ===
Week 2 – Women

- Style: Forró

Aired: September 18, 2016

Artistic judges			Technical judges	
1	2	3	4	5
Giba	Suzana Pires	Luciano Camargo	Carlota Portella	Pavel Kazarian

Running order

Couple	Judges' score					Total score	Average score				Week avg.	Final total	Result
Couple	1	2	3	4	5	Total score	A	T	S	V	Week avg.	Final total	Result
Leticia & Rafael	9.7	9.0	9.9	9.4	9.4	47.4	9.5	9.4	9.0	—	27.9	56.6	2nd
Leona & André	9.5	9.4	10	9.2	9.1	47.2	9.6	9.2	8.7	—	27.5	55.7	5th
Sophia & Rodrigo	10	10	10	10	9.9	49.9	10	10	9.8	—	29.8	59.7	1st
Valesca & Bruno	9.6	10	10	9.2	9.2	48.0	9.9	9.2	9.0	—	28.1	56.3	3rd
Solange & Rodrigo	9.8	10	10	9.8	9.5	49.1	9.9	9.7	9.7	—	29.3	56.0	4th
Lisandra & Marcus										—			Withdrew

=== Week 6 ===
Week 3 – Men

- Style: Funk

Aired: September 25, 2016

Artistic judges			Technical judges	
1	2	3	4	5
Sonia Racy	Diego Hypólito	Ellen Rocche	Fly	Carol Nakamura

Running order

Couple	Judges' score					Total score	Average score				Week avg.	Final total	Result
Couple	1	2	3	4	5	Total score	A	T	S	V	Week avg.	Final total	Result
Brenno & Rachel	9.9	10	10	9.9	10	49.8	10	10	8.9	—	28.9	87.3	4th
Nego do Borel & Juju	9.9	10	10	9.9	10	49.8	10	10	9.4	—	29.4	88.9	1st
Sidney & Camila	9.9	10	10	9.8	9.8	49.5	10	9.8	9.0	—	28.8	83.7	6th
Rainer & Juliana	9.9	10	10	10	10	49.9	10	10	9.8	—	29.8	87.7	3rd
Felipe & Carol	10	10	10	10	10	50.0	10	10	9.4	—	29.4	88.4	2nd
Marcelinho & Yanca	9.9	10	10	9.8	9.9	49.6	10	9.9	8.8	—	28.7	83.8	5th

=== Week 7 ===
Week 3 – Women

- Style: Funk

Aired: October 2, 2016

Artistic judges			Technical judges	
1	2	3	4	5
Débora Nascimento	Leo Chaves	Sandra Annenberg	Octávio Nassur	Cláudia Raia

Running order

Couple	Judges' score					Total score	Average score				Week avg.	Final total	Result
Couple	1	2	3	4	5	Total score	A	T	S	V	Week avg.	Final total	Result
Leona & André	9.6	10	9.8	9.2	8.5	47.1	9.8	8.9	8.9	—	27.6	83.3	5th
Leticia & Rafael	10	9.7	9.6	9.6	9.8	48.7	9.8	9.7	9.2	—	28.7	85.3	2nd
Solange & Rodrigo	9.9	9.6	9.5	9.2	9.7	47.9	9.7	9.5	9.0	—	28.2	84.2	2nd
Sophia & Rodrigo	10	10	10	9.8	9.8	49.6	10	9.8	9.8	—	29.6	89.3	1st
Valesca & Bruno	10	10	10	9.5	9.6	49.1	10	9.6	9.4	—	29.0	85.3	2nd

=== Week 8 ===
Week 4 – Men

- Style: Rock and Roll

Aired: October 9, 2016
(pre-taped on Saturday, October 1)

Artistic judges			Technical judges	
1	2	3	4	5
Ancelmo Gois	Juliana Paiva	Antônio Fagundes	Suely Machado	Anselmo Zolla

Running order

Couple	Judges' score					Total score	Average score				Week avg.	Final total	Result
Couple	1	2	3	4	5	Total score	A	T	S	V	Week avg.	Final total	Result
Marcelinho & Yanca	9.6	10	9.8	9.7	9.7	48.8	9.8	9.7	8.9	—	28.4	112.2	Dance-off
Sidney & Camila	9.4	10	9.9	9.8	9.8	48.9	9.8	9.8	8.7	—	28.3	112.0	Dance-off
Felipe & Carol	9.8	10	10	10	9.9	49.7	9.9	10	9.8	—	29.7	118.1	1st
Nego do Borel & Juju	9.5	9.9	9.9	9.9	9.8	49.0	9.8	9.9	9.3	—	29.0	117.9	2nd
Brenno & Rachel	9.5	9.9	10	9.9	9.9	49.2	9.7	9.9	9.4	—	29.0	116.4	Dance-off
Rainer & Juliana	9.7	9.9	10	9.8	9.8	49.2	9.9	9.8	9.8	—	29.5	117.2	3rd

=== Week 9 ===
Week 4 – Women

- Style: Rock and Roll

Aired: October 16, 2016

Artistic judges			Technical judges	
1	2	3	4	5
Monica Salgado	João Baldasserini	Monique Alfradique	Ciro Barcellos	Claudia Mota

Running order

Couple	Judges' score					Total score	Average score				Week avg.	Final total	Result
Couple	1	2	3	4	5	Total score	A	T	S	V	Week avg.	Final total	Result
Valesca & Bruno	9.0	9.7	9.9	9.0	9.7	47.3	9.5	9.4	8.6	—	27.5	112.8	Dance-off
Solange & Rodrigo	9.5	10	9.8	10	9.8	49.1	9.8	9.9	9.6	—	29.3	113.5	3rd
Leona & André	9.7	10	9.7	9.5	9.8	48.7	9.9	9.7	9.5	—	29.1	112.4	Dance-off
Leticia & Rafael	9.8	9.9	10	9.9	9.6	49.2	9.9	9.8	9.6	—	29.3	114.6	2nd
Sophia & Rodrigo	10	10	10	10	10	50.0	10	10	9.9	—	29.9	119.2	1st

=== Week 10 ===
Dance-off

- Style: Zouk

Aired: October 23, 2016

Artistic judges			Technical judges	
1	2	3	4	5
Letícia Birkheuer	Tiago Abravanel	Ana Paula Araújo	Marcelo Misailidis	Fernanda Chamma

Running order

Couple	Judges' vote					Total votes	Public vote				Week avg.	Final total	Result
Couple	1	2	3	4	5	Total votes	A	T	S	V	Week avg.	Final total	Result
Sidney & Camila		✔		✔	✔	3	—				—	3	Advanced
Leona & André	✔	✔	✔	✔	✔	5	—		✔	✔	—	7	Advanced
Brenno & Rachel	✔		✔			2	—			✔	—	3	Advanced
Valesca & Bruno						0	—		✔		—	1	Eliminated
Marcelinho & Yanca						0	—				—	0	Eliminated

=== Week 11 ===
Team A

- Style: Foxtrot feat. Tap

Aired: October 30, 2016

Artistic judges			Technical judges	
1	2	3	4	5
Cris Vianna	Nando Reis	Mariana Santos	Ivaldo Bertazzo	Marcia Jaqueline

Running order

Couple	Judges' score					Total score	Average score				Week avg.	Final total	Result
Couple	1	2	3	4	5	Total score	A	T	S	V	Week avg.	Final total	Result
Sophia & Rodrigo	10	9.9	10	9.5	10	49.4	10	9.8	9.6	9.9	39.3	39.3	1st
Brenno & Rachel	10	9.9	10	9.2	9.7	48.8	10	9.5	9.5	9.8	38.8	38.8	4th
Solange & Rodrigo	10	10	9.9	9.8	9.6	49.3	10	9.7	9.4	9.0	38.1	38.1	Eliminated
Rainer & Juliana	10	10	10	9.2	9.6	48.8	10	9.4	9.7	9.8	38.9	38.9	3rd
Leona & André	10	9.8	9.8	10	9.9	49.5	9.9	10	9.4	9.8	39.1	39.1	2nd

=== Week 12 ===
Team B

- Style: Foxtrot feat. Tap

Aired: November 6, 2016

Artistic judges			Technical judges	
1	2	3	4	5
Mariana Ximenes	Luan Santana	Maria Joana	Thiago Soares	Regina Calil

Running order

Couple	Judges' score					Total score	Average score				Week avg.	Final total	Result
Couple	1	2	3	4	5	Total score	A	T	S	V	Week avg.	Final total	Result
Nego do Borel & Juju	10	10	10	9.4	9.6	49.0	10	9.5	9.6	9.6	38.7	38.7	2nd
Leticia & Rafael	10	9.8	9.9	9.3	9.4	48.4	9.9	9.4	9.4	9.3	38.0	38.0	Eliminated
Sidney & Camila	9.7	10	10	9.6	9.7	49.0	9.9	9.7	9.5	9.4	38.5	38.5	3rd
Felipe & Carol	10	10	10	9.9	10	49.9	10	10	9.9	9.9	39.8	39.8	1st

=== Week 13 ===
Top 7

- Style: Salsa

Aired: November 13, 2016

Artistic judges			Technical judges	
1	2	3	4	5
Gabriela Pugliesi	Bruno Gagliasso	Gaby Amarantos	Carlinhos de Jesus	Helô Gouvêa

Running order

Couple	Judges' score					Total score	Average score				Week avg.	Final total	Result
Couple	1	2	3	4	5	Total score	A	T	S	V	Week avg.	Final total	Result
Felipe & Carol	9.9	10	10	10	9.7	49.6	10	9.9	9.6	9.8	39.3	39.3	2nd
Leona & André	9.7	10	10	9.9	9.5	49.1	9.9	9.7	9.5	9.0	38.1	38.1	Eliminated
Sidney & Camila	10	10	10	10	9.8	49.8	10	9.9	9.4	9.3	38.6	38.6	6th
Rainer & Juliana	9.8	10	10	9.9	9.8	49.5	9.9	9.9	9.8	9.6	39.2	39.2	3rd
Brenno & Rachel	10	10	10	9.9	9.9	49.8	10	9.9	9.4	9.5	38.8	38.8	5th
Sophia & Rodrigo	10	10	10	10	10	50.0	10	10	9.9	9.9	39.8	39.8	1st
Nego do Borel & Juju	10	10	10	9.9	9.9	49.8	10	9.9	9.5	9.6	39.0	39.0	4th

=== Week 14 ===
Top 6

- Style: Country

Aired: November 20, 2016

Artistic judges			Technical judges	
1	2	3	4	5
Fernanda Motta	Hugo Gloss	Christiane Torloni	Renato Vieira	Suely Machado

Running order

Couple	Judges' score					Total score	Average score				Week avg.	Final total	Result
Couple	1	2	3	4	5	Total score	A	T	S	V	Week avg.	Final total	Result
Rainer & Juliana	10	9.9	9.0	9.4	9.5	47.8	9.6	9.5	9.2	9.4	37.7	76.9	5th
Sidney & Camila	9.8	9.8	9.5	9.2	9.0	47.3	9.7	9.1	8.3	9.0	36.1	74.7	Eliminated
Nego do Borel & Juju	10	10	10	9.7	9.6	49.3	10	9.7	9.6	9.3	38.6	77.6	4th
Sophia & Rodrigo	10	10	10	10	10	50.0	10	10	9.9	9.7	39.6	79.4	1st
Felipe & Carol	10	10	10	10	10	50.0	10	10	9.8	9.9	39.7	79.0	2nd
Brenno & Rachel	10	10	10	9.8	9.9	49.7	10	9.9	9.6	9.7	39.2	78.0	3rd

=== Week 15 ===
Top 5

- Style: Waltz

Aired: November 27, 2016

Artistic judges			Technical judges	
1	2	3	4	5
Joyce Pascowitch	Klebber Toledo	Agatha Moreira	Anselmo Zolla	Inês Bogéa

Running order

Couple	Judges' score					Total score	Average score				Week avg.	Final total	Result
Couple	1	2	3	4	5	Total score	A	T	S	V	Week avg.	Final total	Result
Nego do Borel & Juju	9.9	9.7	9.9	9.7	9.7	48.9	9.8	9.7	9.1	9.4	38.0	115.6	Eliminated
Brenno & Rachel	9.9	9.9	9.9	9.8	9.8	49.3	9.9	9.8	9.1	9.5	38.3	116.3	3rd
Rainer & Juliana	10	10	10	9.8	9.8	49.6	10	9.8	9.5	9.6	38.9	115.8	4th
Felipe & Carol	10	10	10	10	10	50.0	10	10	9.8	9.9	39.7	118.7	2nd
Sophia & Rodrigo	10	10	10	9.9	9.9	49.8	10	9.9	9.6	9.9	39.4	118.8	1st

=== Week 16 ===
Top 4 – Semifinals

- Style: Pasodoble

Aired: December 4, 2016

Artistic judges			Technical judges	
1	2	3	4	5
Fábio de Melo	Camila Queiroz	Arthur Aguiar	Carlota Portella	Marcelo Misailidis

Running order

Couple	Judges' score					Total score	Average score				Week avg.	Final total	Result
Couple	1	2	3	4	5	Total score	A	T	S	V	Week avg.	Final total	Result
Sophia & Rodrigo	10	10	10	10	10	50.0	10	10	9.7	9.9	39.6	158.4	1st (finalist)
Brenno & Rachel	9.8	9.8	9.9	9.8	9.9	49.2	9.8	9.9	9.3	9.5	38.5	155.0	Eliminated
Rainer & Juliana	9.9	10	9.9	9.9	9.9	49.6	9.9	9.9	9.8	9.7	39.3	155.1	3rd (finalist)
Felipe & Carol	10	10	10	10	10	50.0	10	10	9.8	9.9	39.7	158.4	1st (finalist)

=== Week 17 ===
Top 3 – Finals

- Style: Tango & Samba

Aired: December 11, 2016

Artistic judges			Technical judges	
1	2	3	6	7
Maria Júlia Coutinho	Bruno Astuto	Tatá Werneck	Fernanda Chamma	J.C. Violla
4	5		8	
Kaká	Viviane Araújo		Ana Botafogo	

Running order

Tango
Couple	Judges' score				Total score	Average score				Dance total	Final total	Result
Couple	1	2	3	4	Total score	A	T	S	V	Dance total	Final total	Result
Couple	5	6	7	8	Total score	A	T	S	V	Dance total	Final total	Result
Rainer & Juliana	9.8	10	10	10	78.9	10	9.7	9.4	9.5	38.6	38.6	N/A
Rainer & Juliana	10	9.8	9.5	9.8	78.9	10	9.7	9.4	9.5	38.6	38.6	N/A
Felipe & Carol	10	10	10	10	79.8	10	9.9	9.6	9.9	39.4	39.4	N/A
Felipe & Carol	10	9.9	10	9.9	79.8	10	9.9	9.6	9.9	39.4	39.4	N/A
Sophia & Rodrigo	10	10	10	10	80.0	10	10	9.8	9.7	39.5	39.5	N/A
Sophia & Rodrigo	10	10	10	10	80.0	10	10	9.8	9.7	39.5	39.5	N/A

Samba
Couple	Judges' score				Total score	Average score				Dance total	Final total	Result
Couple	1	2	3	4	Total score	A	T	S	V	Dance total	Final total	Result
Couple	5	6	7	8	Total score	A	T	S	V	Dance total	Final total	Result
Rainer & Juliana	9.9	9.9	10	10	79.5	10	9.9	9.4	9.5	38.8	77.4	Third place
Rainer & Juliana	10	9.9	9.9	9.9	79.5	10	9.9	9.4	9.5	38.8	77.4	Third place
Felipe & Carol	10	10	10	10	80.0	10	10	9.7	9.9	39.6	79.0	Winner
Felipe & Carol	10	10	10	10	80.0	10	10	9.7	9.9	39.6	79.0	Winner
Sophia & Rodrigo	10	9.9	10	10	79.8	10	10	9.6	9.6	39.2	78.7	Runner-up
Sophia & Rodrigo	10	10	9.9	10	79.8	10	10	9.6	9.6	39.2	78.7	Runner-up
