= Fausto Silva =

Brazilian television presenter

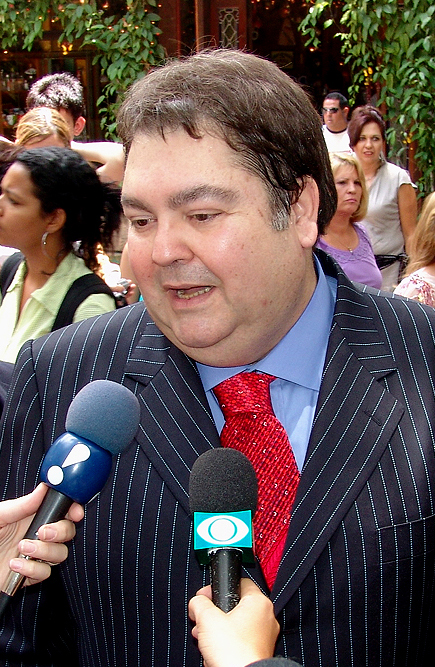
- Silva in 2005
- Born: Fausto Corrêa Silva; May 2, 1950 (age 76); São Paulo, Brazil
- Occupation: Television presenter
- Years active: 1964–2023
- Presenting career
- Show: Perdidos na Noite (1984–1988); Domingão do Faustão (1989–2021); Faustão na Band (2022–2023)
- Network: TV Gazeta (1984); RecordTV (1984–1986); Band (1986–1988; 2022–2023); TV Globo (1989–2021)

Fausto Corrêa Silva, also known as Faustão (meaning "Big Fausto"), is a Brazilian television presenter and former radio host. Born on May 2, 1950, in Porto Ferreira, São Paulo, Brazil, he began his career in radio at the age of 14 and transitioned to television in the 1980s.

A turning point in his career came with the creation and hosting of Perdidos na Noite ("Lost in the Night"), a late-night variety show that aired from 1984 to 1988 on networks including TV Gazeta, TV Record, and Rede Bandeirantes. Known for its improvisational style, visible backstage elements, irreverent humor, and raw production aesthetic, Perdidos na Noite gained a cult following. It featured interviews, music performances, satire, and social commentary, often pushing boundaries for the time.

In 1989, Faustão was recruited by Rede Globo to host the Sunday afternoon variety show Domingão do Faustão, which aired from 1989 to 2021. The program featured live music performances, dance competitions, and various entertainment segments. After leaving Globo, he hosted Faustão na Band on Rede Bandeirantes from 2022 to 2023.

Due to heart failure, Silva underwent heart transplantation on 27 August 2023 at Albert Einstein Israelite Hospital, in São Paulo. He also underwent kidney transplantation in the same hospital on 26 February 2024. He subsequently underwent a liver transplant on 6 August 2025 and another kidney transplantation on the following day.

== Career ==
=== Television ===
Year	Work	Role	Channel
1983-1984	Balancê	Announcer	Rádio Excelsior / TV Gazeta
1984–1988	Perdidos na Noite	Presenter	TV Gazeta / RecordTV / Band
1988	Safenados e Safadinhos	Presenter	Band
1989–2021	Domingão do Faustão	Presenter	TV Globo
2022	Viradão do Faustão	Presenter	Band
2022–2023	Faustão na Band	Presenter	Band

=== Cinema ===
Year	Work	Role
1990	Sonho de Verão	Himself
1991	Inspetor Faustão e o Mallandro	Inspetor Faustão
