= Faustão na Band =

Brazilian TV variety show

- Directed by: Beto Silva; Cris Gomes
- Presented by: Fausto Silva
- Country of origin: Brazil
- Original language: Portuguese
- No. of seasons: 1

Production
- Production location: São Paulo
- Running time: 90 minutes

Original release
- Network: Rede Bandeirantes
- Release: January 17, 2022 – July 7, 2023

Faustão na Band (lit. Big Fausto on Band) is a Brazilian variety show that was broadcast by Rede Bandeirantes. Hosted by Fausto Silva, it premiered January 17, 2022, following Silva's departure of TV Globo and its long-running Domingão do Faustão.

== Background ==
Fausto Silva had previously presented the long-running Sunday-afternoon show Domingão do Faustão on Globo since 1989. Before being signed by Globo, Silva had achieved notoriety for hosting the talk show Perdidos na Noite on Band. In January 2021, it was rumored that Silva would leave Globo in December 2021, after declining a move to Thursday nights. In April 2021, it was reported that Silva had signed a five-year deal with Rede Bandeirantes beginning in 2022. Cris Gomes—a director who worked on Domingão—was also reported to be involved in the deal.

On June 13, 2021, Silva missed an episode of Domingão for the first time in the program's history, stating that it was due to a urinary tract infection. On June 17, Globo announced that Silva would be leaving the network, and that Domingão do Faustão would be replaced in its timeslot by a new program hosted by Luciano Huck. Domingão do Faustão was subsequently cancelled, with the remainder of the 18th season of Dança dos Famosos airing as a standalone program hosted by Tiago Leifert (who had guest hosted Domingão the previous Sunday).

In July 2021, Rede Bandeirantes officially announced that it had signed Silva to host a new variety show that would premiere in 2022. Despite leaving his previous show, Silva was still under contract with Globo until January. The two-hour program would air on weeknights, with a premiere set for January 17, 2022.

Band had initially considered filming the program at a theatre, but elected to instead broadcast it from one of the main soundstages of its São Paulo facilities; at the suggestion of Silva, the soundstage was dedicated in honor of Band's founder as the João Jorge Saad studio. Band began to produce pilot episodes in late-December; Silva asked Band executives to not attend, as he was wary about performing for larger audiences while still under contract with Globo. Former Jornal Nacional weather reporter Anne Lottermann was also tested as a designated substitute host.

Advertisers and critics doubted whether Faustão na Band would be successful, noting Band's decision to schedule it on weeknights (as opposed to Domingão and other Brazilian variety shows, which typically air weekly on Saturdays or Sundays); a former Band executive stated that the show would need to stay above 6 points in the IBOPE television ratings in order to be sustainable.

At midnight on January 1, 2022, Band broadcast the New Year's special Viradão do Faustão as a preview for the show, which marked Silva's official return to the network.

== Format and segments ==
The series followed a similar format to Domingão do Faustão, featuring music and dance performances, interviews, and entertainment segments, some of which being renamed or retooled versions of segments that had previously been conducted on Domingão.

Segments of the program have included the home video segment Cassetadas do Faustão (Big Fausto's Cassettes; similar to the Domingão segment Videocassetadas), dance competition Dança das Feras (Dance of Beasts, similar to the Domingão segment Dança dos Famosos), Grana ou Fama (Money or Fame), comedy competition Mochila do Riso, Busão do Faustão (Big Fausto's Big Bus), A Hora da Decisão (Big Decision Time), Na Pista do Sucessos, Arquivo Pessoal (Personal Archive, initially titled Esta é a Sua Vida, lit. "This Is Your Life"), Desbravadores do Planeta (Planet Pioneers, with biologists João Paulo Krajewski and Roberta Bonaldo), Direto pro Doutor (Straight to the Doctor), Churrascão do Faustão (Big Fausto's Big Barbeque), and Pizzaria do Faustão.

== Broadcast ==
Faustão na Band premiered on January 17, 2022, with the series premiere featuring musical guests Seu Jorge, Zeca Pagodinho, and Alexandre Pires. The lineup was originally slated to include Alcione, Jorge, Martinho da Vila, and Paulinho da Viola, but Martinho dropped out for undisclosed personal reasons, while Alcione and Paulinho dropped out after they tested positive for COVID-19. On January 18, it was reported that six members of the show's dance troupe—the Bailarinas do Faustão—had also tested positive for COVID-19.

On January 19, Band announced that Silva had tested positive for COVID-19, and that production of Faustão na Band had been temporarily suspended. It was stated that the show had enough material to last through January 26. Anne Lottermann also tested positive for COVID-19, resulting in João Guilherme Silva serving as a guest host. On January 20, it was reported that Martinho's decision to drop out from the program—a decision made only an hour before filming began—was prompted by concerns over lax COVID-19 protocols in the production; his team noted that a requirement to present negative COVID-19 tests was loosely enforced, and that members of the house orchestra were not wearing face masks. Band did not comment on Martinho's allegations, but did strengthen its health and safety protocols in response to the outbreaks.

In July 2022, it was reported that Band was planning cuts to the program due to high production costs in relation to its viewership, including laying off 40 to 50 staff members, reducing its length from two hours to 90 minutes beginning August 23 (initially to accommodate party broadcasts for the 2022 general election), and moving to a bi- or tri-weekly schedule beginning in 2023. The show went on a two-week break beginning July 11, with compilation episodes airing in its place. When it returned on July 25, Band experimented with shortening the show to 90 minutes, scheduling Zeca Camargo's game show 1001 Perguntas as a lead-out. Beginning August 23, the program was moved from 8:30 p.m. to 8:55 p.m., and shortened by 25 minutes to accommodate party broadcasts. On September 12, it was reported that the 90-minute format would become permanent beginning October 31, as Band had acquired the Portuguese telenovela Valor da Vida to air in a 10:00 p.m. timeslot.

While Silva and Band did contemplate moving the show to a weekly format in 2023, they decided against doing so due to improving viewership. However, several changes began to be implemented in late-2022 and early-2023, including removing the Bailarinas do Faustão from the show's staff and contracting them on a freelance basis, and dropping several long-running segments (such as Cassetadas) in an effort to retool the show.

On May 18, 2023, it was reported that Silva was preparing to leave the program on May 31 due to budgetary issues and declining viewership, with Lottermann and João Guilherme Silva expected to guest host the show until its winter break. On June 9, 2023, Band announced that new episodes would air until July 28, and that two programs—Melhor da Noite and Perrengue no Dia—would premiere in its timeslot beginning July 31. Ultimately, the final episode would instead air on July 7, after which the timeslot began to be occupied by reruns, and it was reported that Band was in talks with João and Anne on developing a new project.

== Reception ==
=== Viewership ===
In the IBOPE ratings, the initial Viradão do Faustão special had an average of 1.2 points, peaking at 1.8 points in Greater São Paulo and finishing fourth in its timeslot. A prime time encore presentation had an average 3.1 rating. The series premiere of Faustão na Band received an average rating of 8.3 points, finishing in second behind only Globo in its timeslot. In comparison, the timeslot's previous programming (which previously included Show da Fé and the Portuguese telenovela Nazaré) only pulled an average rating around 1. Its viewership declined by 25% in São Paulo on its subsequent episode, while the first week of shows finished with an average rating of 6.2 points.

In its first four weeks on the air, Faustão na Band averaged 4.2 ratings points, ranking fourth in its timeslot. In the IBOPE national television panel, the show scored an average of 3.2 rating points in the same period, with its largest audiences being in the São Paulo, Porto Alegre, and Campinas markets. The July 8 episode, which featured a 50th anniversary interview with Chitãozinho & Xororó, tied for third with RecordTV with 3.6 points. By the end of 2022, the show was back to an average of 2–4 ratings points. The program was credited with having helped improve Band's national prime time viewership by 24% year-over-year.
