= Perdidos na Noite =

Brazilian television show

- Genre: auditorium program
- Created by: Goulart de Andrade
- Opening theme: "Ghostbusters", Ray Parker Jr. (Record) "Tarzan Boy", Baltimora (Bandeirantes)

Perdidos na Noite (Lost in the Night) was a Brazilian TV show presented by Fausto Silva.

The show made its debut in 1984 on TV Gazeta in São Paulo and was transferred to TV Record in the same year. From 1986 to 1988, It was exhibited by Rede Bandeirantes.

The name of the attraction was inspired by the American feature film Midnight Cowboy, that's received the title Lost in the Night in Brazil.

== History ==
Fausto Silva was invited to host the show after its success on the radio in São Paulo. The show began to be recorded at the Brigadeiro Theater and was shown in a time slot occupied by the Goulart de Andrade Program on Gazeta (also used for creations by the Olhar Eletrônico production company). After moving to Record, it was recorded at Teatro Záccaro.
