= Márcia Jaqueline =

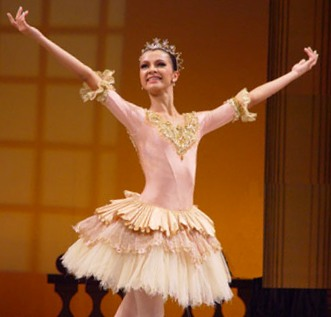
Márcia Jaqueline

Márcia Jaqueline (born July 16, 1982, Rio de Janeiro) is prima ballerina in the ballet of the Theatro Municipal do Rio de Janeiro.
