= Maria Joana =

Brazilian actress (born 1986)

- Born: Maria Joana Chiappetta; 27 July 1986 (age 40); Rio de Janeiro, Brazil
- Occupation: Actress
- Years active: 2010–present

Maria Joana Chiappetta (born 27 July 1986) is a Brazilian actress. On 17 December 2017, she won the fourteenth season of Dança dos Famosos, the Brazilian version of Strictly Come Dancing.

== Career ==
=== Filmography ===
Television
Year	Title	Role	Ref.
2010–11	Araguaia	Maria da Glória Mourão	
2011–12	Fina Estampa	Laura	
2012	Cheias de Charme	Bebel	
2013	Flor do Caribe	Maria Carolina Fonseca (Carol)	
2014–15	Malhação	Natalia Barreto (Nat)	
2014	Meu Amigo Encosto	Rita	
2014	Lilyhammer	Alex	
2015–16	Além do Tempo	Michele	
2015	Desafiados	Herself	
2016–17	Sol Nascente	Carolina Peixoto (Carol)	
2017	Dança dos Famosos	Herself	

Awards and achievements
Preceded by Felipe Simas & Carol Agnelo	Dança dos Famosos winner Season 14 (2017 with Reginaldo Sama)	Succeeded by TBD
