= Mario Sergio Cortella =

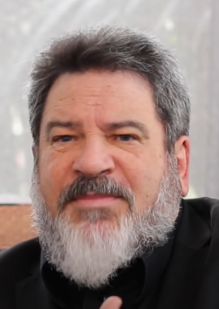
- Mario Sergio Cortella, in 2023
- Born: 5 March 1954 (age 72); Londrina, Paraná, Brazil

Academic background
- Education: Pontifical Catholic University of São Paulo
- Doctoral advisor: Paulo Freire
- Other advisor: Moacir Gadotti

Academic work
- Discipline: Education; philosophy
- Institutions: Pontifical Catholic University of São Paulo

Mario Sergio Cortella (born March 5, 1954) is a Brazilian philosopher, writer, educator and speaker most known for putting into the public sphere and helping popularize in questions related to philosophy in Brazilian contemporary society. He is also known as a prominent educator. Having studied with Paulo Freire, Cortella applied Freire's approach to education while he was secretary of education of São Paulo city during the '90s. He is professor of theological philosophy at PUC-SP.

== Early life ==
He was born in Londrina, Paraná. In 1973/74 he experienced the monastic life in a convent of the Discalced Carmelite Order, but abandoned the prospect of becoming a monk for an academic career. He graduated in 1975 at the Faculty of Philosophy our Lady Mediatrix. In 1989 he completed his master's degree in education from the Pontifical Catholic University of São Paulo (PUC-SP), under the guidance of Moacir Gadotti, and in 1997, under the guidance of Paulo Freire, completed his doctorate in education from PUC-SP.

== Career ==
He is a full professor in the Department of Theology and Religious Studies and Graduate Education at PUC-SP, beginning in 1977 and visiting professor at Fundação Dom Cabral since 1997. He was in the GVPEC Fundação Getúlio Vargas between 1998 and 2010.

He held the post of Municipal Secretary of Education of São Paulo (1991–1992) during the Erundina administration and was a member of CAPES/Education Ministry Technical Scientific Council of Basic Education (2008/2010).

He hosted the program Naughty Dialogues on TV PUC, the University Channel program.

== Publications ==
Cortella has published works in the field of philosophy and education. He is the author, among other works, of:

- A Escola e o Conhecimento: fundamentos epistemológicos e políticos
- Nos Labirintos da Moral, com Yves de La Taille
- Não Espere Pelo Epitáfio: Provocações Filosóficas
- Não Nascemos Prontos!
- Viver em Paz para Morrer em Paz: Paixão, Sentido e Felicidade
- Não se desespere! Provocações filosóficas
- Sobre a Esperança: Diálogo, com Frei Betto
- O que é a Pergunta?, Com Silmara Casadei
- Política: Para Não Ser Idiota, com Renato Janine Ribeiro
- Vida e Carreira: um equilíbrio possível?, com Pedro Mandelli
- Educação e Esperança: sete reflexões breves para recusar o biocídio
- Qual é a tua Obra? Inquietações Propositivas sobre Gestão, Liderança e Ética
- Vivemos Mais! Vivemos Bem? Por Uma Vida Plena
- Liderança em Foco
- Ética e Vergonha na Cara!, com Clóvis de Barros Filho
- Pensar Bem Nos Faz Bem!
- Descartes, a paixão pela razão

== See also ==
- Christian philosophy
- Philosophy of religion
