= Isabella Santoni =

Brazilian actress (born 1995)

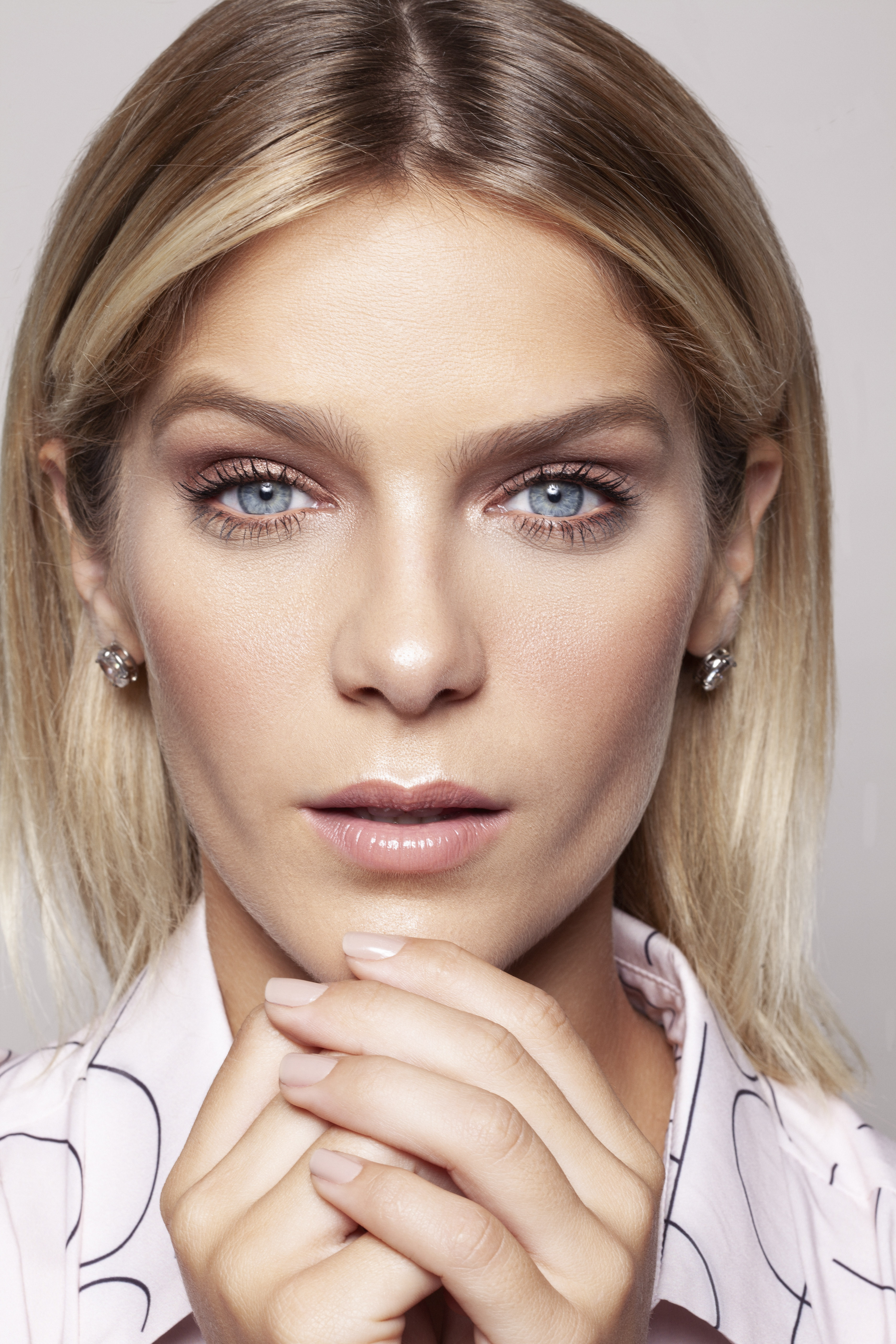
- Santoni in 2019
- Born: Isabella Ribeiro Santoni; 6 May 1995 (age 31); Nilópolis, Rio de Janeiro, Brazil
- Occupation: Actress
- Years active: 2013–present
- Height: 1.60 m (5 ft 3 in)

Isabella Ribeiro Santoni (Brazilian Portuguese: [izaˈbɛlɐ sɐ̃ˈtõni], Italian: [sanˈtoːni]; born 6 May 1995) is a Brazilian actress. She became nationally known as Karina, the main role of the 22nd season of Malhação.

== Biography ==
Isabella Santoni was born in Nilópolis, Rio de Janeiro, to teacher Ana Cristina Ribeiro. She grew up in Nova Iguaçu, in the Baixada Fluminense, until she was 15 years old. When she decided to become an actress, she tried to enroll in a vacation course at the Casa de Artes Laranjeiras in Rio de Janeiro. The minimum age to start the course was 16, but Santoni called the place and convinced them to accept her at 15.

Santoni had to make some sacrifices because of her career, one of them was the request to transfer a private school to a public one, since she could not reconcile work with her studies. Even though the teaching conditions were precarious, Santoni was able to be approved for the Federal University of the State of Rio de Janeiro (UniRio) in 2013, where she majored in theater.

== Filmography ==
=== Television ===
Year	Title	Role	Ref
2014	As Canalhas	Laura	
2014–15	Malhação Sonhos	Karina "Ka" Duarte	
2016	Ligações Perigosas	Isabel D'Ávila de Alencar	
2016–17	A Lei do Amor	Letícia Martins Bezerra Leitão	
2017	Dança dos Famosos	Participant (8th place)	
2018	Orgulho e Paixão	Charlotte Williamson	
2021–24	Dom	Viviane "Vivi"	
2024	A Divisão		

=== Film ===
Year	Title	Role
2013	Visceral	Bel
2018	Missão Cupido	Rita Fenner
2022	Abestalhados 2	Isabella

=== Videoclip ===
Year	Song	Artist
2012	"Ainda Tem o Mar"	Banda Maghi
2018	"Ninguém é Igual a Ninguém"	Roks feat. Badaui

=== Webseries ===
Year	Title	Role
2013	Lindas e Tensas	Pati
2014	Curriculum Vitae: Viva os Melhores anos da sua vida	Ana Luíza
2020	Quarentenados	Sophia

== Stage ==
Year	Title	Role
2016	Cinco Júlias	Júlia 5
2017	Léo e Bia	Bia

== Discography ==
as guest artist

Song	Year	Album
"Em Tudo Ser Campeão" (Flamiguinhos feat Isabella Santoni)	2020	Entrando em Campo

== Awards and nominations ==
Year	Award	Category	Work	Results
2014	Prêmio F5	The most beautiful girl of the year	Herself	Won
2014	Capricho Awards	Nacional Actress	Karina in Malhação (22.ª temporada)	Won
2014	Capricho Awards	Troféu Pegação (with Rafael Vitti)	Karina in Malhação (22.ª temporada)	Won
2015	Troféu Internet	Revelation of the Year	Karina in Malhação (22.ª temporada)	Nominated
2015	Troféu Imprensa	Revelation of the Year	Karina in Malhação (22.ª temporada)	Won
2015	Prêmio Contigo! de TV	Television Revelation	Karina in Malhação (22.ª temporada)	Nominated
2015	Prêmio Extra de Televisão	Female Revelation	Karina in Malhação (22.ª temporada)	Nominated
2015	Melhores do Ano	Best Revelation Actress	Karina in Malhação (22.ª temporada)	Won
2015	Meus Prêmios Nick	The most beautiful girl of the year	Herself	Won
2016	Prêmio Febre Teen	The most beautiful girl of the year	Herself	Won
