= Rainer Cadete =

Brazilian actor

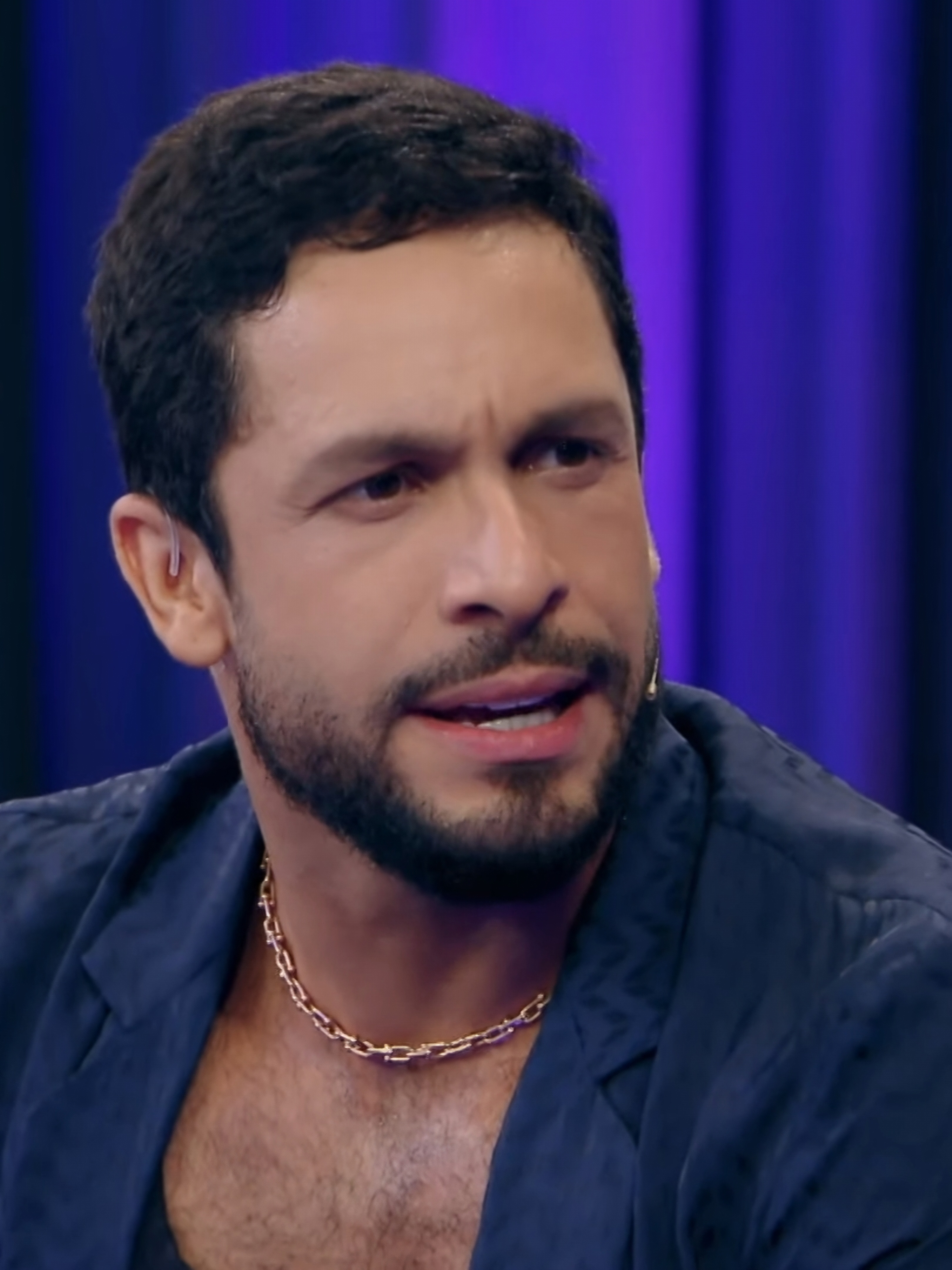
- Cadete in 2024
- Born: 24 July 1987 (age 38); Brasília, DF, Brazil
- Occupation: Actor
- Years active: 2009–present
- Children: 1

Rainer Cadete (born July 24, 1987) is a Brazilian actor. He is known for his roles in various Brazilian telenovelas such as Cama de Gato (2009), Verdades Secretas (2015), Êta Mundo Bom! (2016) among others.

He played the role of Shaolin in the comedy film Cine Holliúdy (2012).

== Personal life ==
In October 2021, Cadete came out as sexually fluid. In February 2022, Rainer stated he is also pansexual.

== Filmography ==
=== Television ===
Year	Title	Role	Notes
2009	Cama de Gato	Nuno Alves Moreira	
2013	Amor à Vida	Rafael Nero	
2015-2021	Verdades Secretas	Visky	
2016	Êta Mundo Bom!	Celso Sampaio Carneiro	
2019	A Dona do Pedaço	Teodoro "Téo" Pacheco	
2023	Terra e Paixão	Luigi San Marco	
2025	Êta Mundo Melhor!	Celso Sampaio Carneiro	
2026	Quem Ama Cuida	César	

=== Film ===
Year	Title	Role	Notes
2012	Cine Holliúdy	Shaolin	
2017	Polícia Federal: A Lei É para Todos	Ítalo Agneli	
