= Letícia Birkheuer =

Brazilian model and actress

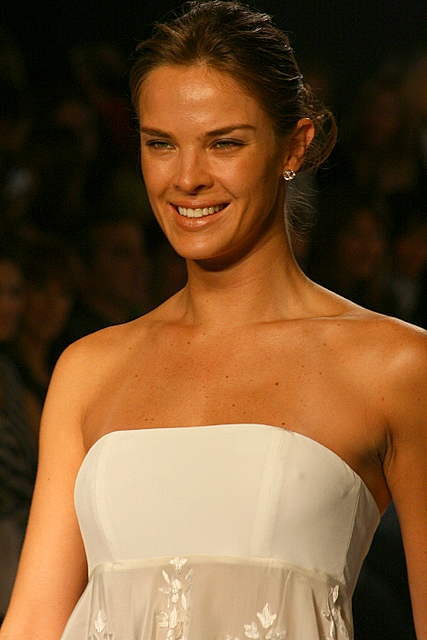
- Birkheuer at the 2007 Fashion Rio Verão
- Born: April 25, 1978 (age 48); Passo Fundo, Rio Grande do Sul, Brazil
- Occupations: Actress, model
- Children: 1
- Modeling information
- Height: 1.80 m (5 ft 11 in)
- Hair color: Brown
- Eye color: Green

Letícia Birkheuer (born April 25, 1978) is a Brazilian model and actress.

== Biography ==
Birkheuer was born in Passo Fundo, Rio Grande do Sul, daughter of Irineu and Elvira Birkheuer. Her sister, Michele Birkheuer, is also an actress and model. She is of German descent.

== Career ==
She was discovered while playing volleyball in Porto Alegre, southern Brazil and in 2006 she was the 7th best-paid Brazilian model. She is a Sport Club Internacional supporter. Until recently she lived in New York City, but has since moved back to Brazil to work as an actress in the soap opera Belíssima.

In December 2010, Letícia Birkheuer was on the cover of Brazilian Playboy.

== Personal life ==
Letícia was engaged to Alexandre Birman between 2007 and 2008. She was married to the businessman Alexandre Fumanovich, with whom she has a son, João Guilherme, born on October 8, 2011.
