= Hugo Gloss =

Brazilian journalist (born 1985)

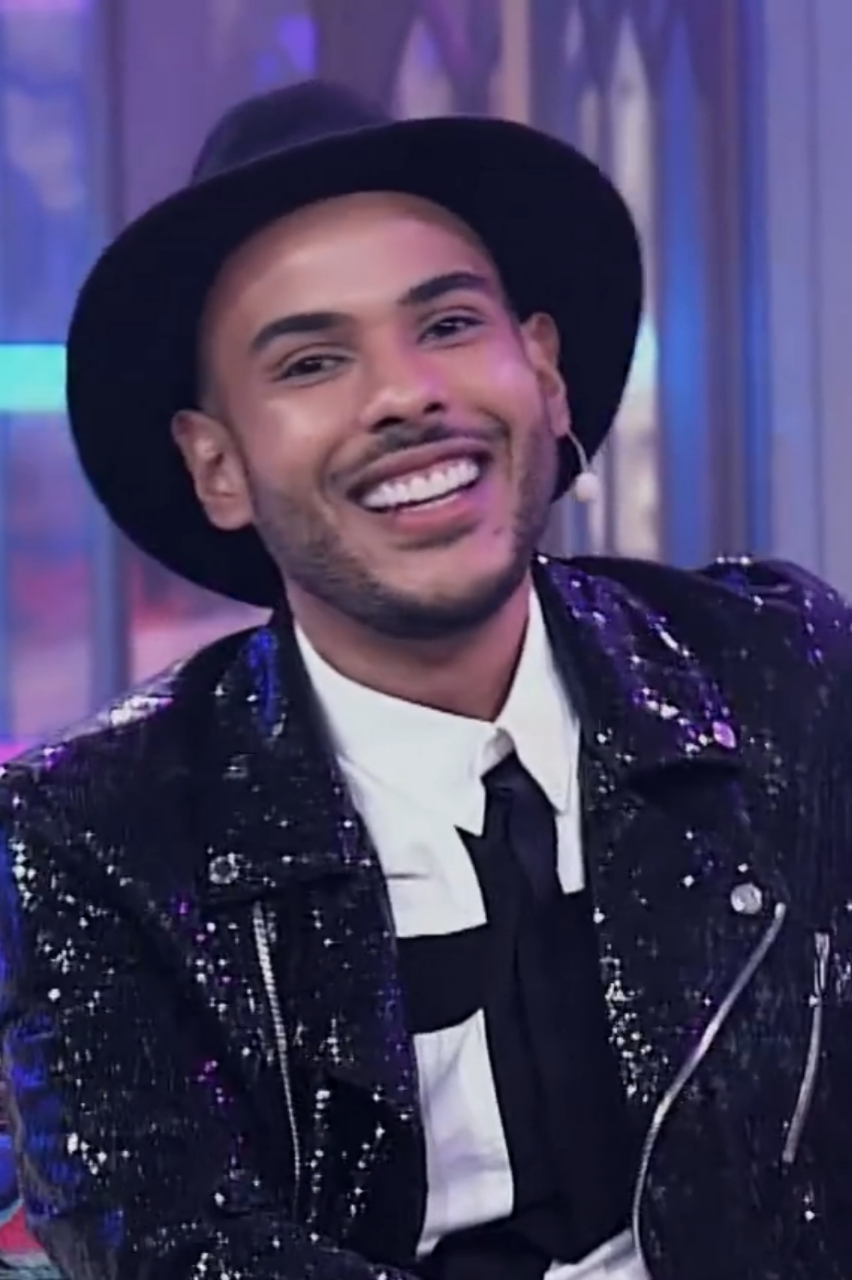
- Hugo Gloss in 2017
- Born: Bruno Rocha da Fonseca; 26 November 1985 (age 39); Brasília, D.F., Brazil
- Occupation(s): Journalist, presenter, voice actor, YouTuber, blogger
- Television: Caldeirão do Huck on Rede Globo, Ridículos on MTV Brasil

Bruno Rocha da Fonseca (born 26 November 1985), known as Hugo Gloss, is a Brazilian presenter, journalist, voice actor, blogger and YouTuber.

== Biography and career ==
Born in Brasília, Hugo Gloss has a degree in journalism and pedagogy and a master's degree in public relations. He became known in 2010 on Twitter, when he created a fake profile inspired by humorist Christian Pior, and named in a spoof of Hugo Boss; he published things that drew attention and because of that he became well known in the social network, calling attention of celebrities such as Claudia Leitte and Luciano Huck, at the time he was living outside Brazil, but because of his success, he returned to his home country.

In 2010, he was invited to join the cast of Big Brother Brasil, but he ultimately did not join the show. Then came the opportunity to join the Globo program Caldeirão do Huck, where he worked as an editor for several years. He became friends of celebrities, and decided to create a website, hugogloss.com, which today is a company and already has four people working there beyond. The blogger is always traveling to different places, including places outside the country to make coverage of major events like the Academy Awards, Billboard Music Awards, Video Music Awards, among others, to his website, which is one of the most accessed from Brazil.

In 2016, Hugo Gloss was invited by MTV (Brazil) to be one of the presenters of the Brazilian version of Ridiculousness, known in Brazil as Ridículos alongside actor Felipe Titto and Ellen Mil Grau. In social networks, it is very successful, there are more than 7 million followers on Instagram alone, more than 4 million just in Facebook. O his website is one of the most visited sites in Brazil, it is the first character of the Brazilian internet have a profile seen in Snapchat.
