= Felipe Simas =

Brazilian actor (born 1993)

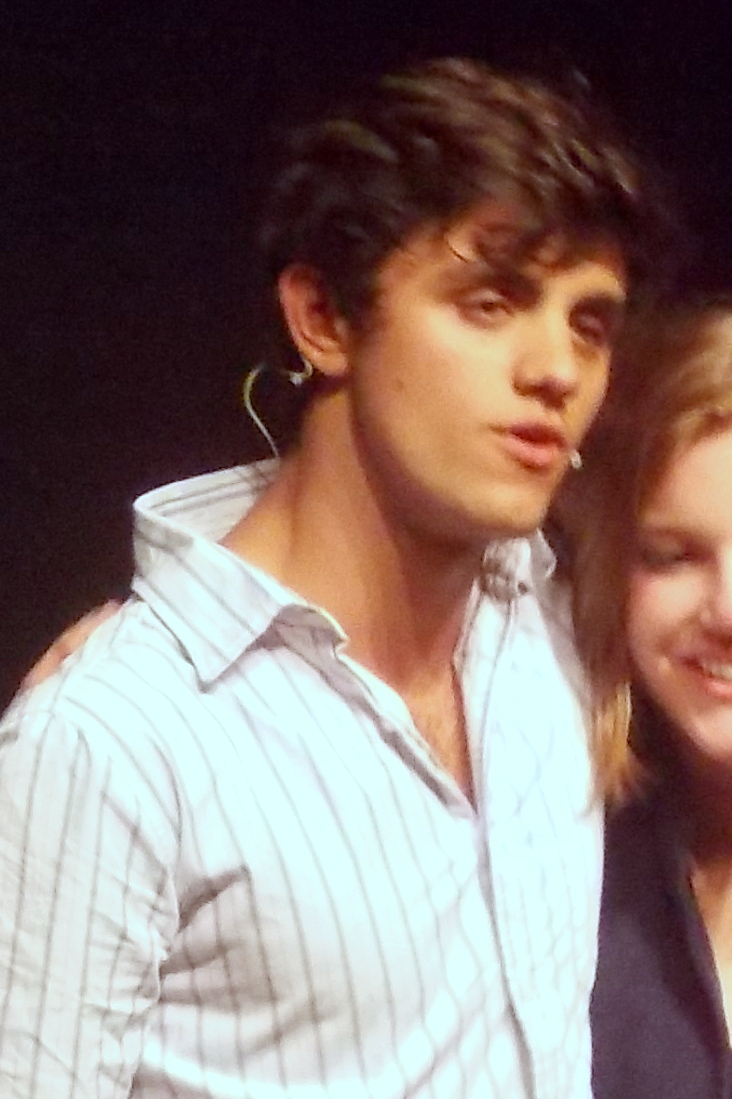
- Simas at the 2013 Angra International Theater Festival
- Born: Felipe Sang Simas; 26 January 1993 (age 33); Rio de Janeiro, Brazil
- Occupation: Actor
- Years active: 2012–present
- Height: 1.74 m (5 ft 9 in)
- Spouse: Mariana Uhlmann (m. 2016)
- Children: 3
- Father: Beto Simas
- Relatives: Rodrigo Simas (brother); Bruno Gissoni (half-brother)

Felipe Sang Simas (born 26 January 1993) is a Brazilian actor.

== Career ==
Simas made his debut on television on the 2013 telenovela Flor do Caribe. In 2015, he was cast as one of the protagonist of the telenovela Totalmente Demais, playing the role of Jonatas.

== Personal life ==
On 14 April 2014, Simas' first son, Joaquim, with and her then girlfriend Mariana Uhlmann. On 3 April 2016, Simas and Uhlmann got married in Itaipava. In 2017, they had a daughter Maria and in 2020, they had a third child, a boy named Vicente.

== Filmography ==
=== Television ===
Year	Title	Role	Notes
2013	Flor do Caribe	Pedro	Episode: "September 13th"
2014–2015	Malhação Sonhos	Ricardo Tucci Cobreloa "Cobra"	Season 22
2015–2016	Totalmente Demais	Jonatas Castro	
2016	Dança dos Famosos	Participant	Season 13 winner
2017	Os Dias Eram Assim	Caíque Sampaio	
2018–2019	O Tempo Não Para	Elmo Viégas	
2019	Segunda Chamada	Maicon Douglas Pereira	Season 1
2020–2021	Salve-se Quem Puder	Téo Santamarina	
2023	Fuzuê	Heitor Pinto Montebello	
2023	As Aventuras de José e Durval	Durval de Lima "Xororó"	
2025	Dona de Mim	Danilo Santos	
2025	Tremembé	Daniel Cravinhos de Paula e Silva	

=== Film ===
Year	Title	Role
2014	Na Quebrada	Zeca
2016	Pelé: Birth of a Legend	Garrincha
2025	Verde Ou Pisa No Meu Pé	Alex
2025	Rio de Sangue	TBA
2025	Asa Branca, a Voz da Arena	Waldemar Ruy dos Santos "Asa Branca"

== Stage ==
Year	Title	Role
2012–15	Conto de Verão	Angelo
2013	Romeu na Roda	Teobaldo
2015	Corcunda de Notre Dame	Capitão Febo
2016–17	Romeu e Julieta	Romeu

== Awards and nominations ==
Year	Awards	Category	Nominated work	Result	Ref
2015	Troféu Internet	Best Actor	Cobra in Malhação Sonhos	Nominated	
2015	Prêmio Jovem Brasileiro	Best Young Actor	Cobra in Malhação Sonhos	Nominated	
2015	Prêmio Contigo! de TV	TV Revelation	Cobra in Malhação Sonhos	Nominated	
2016	Troféu Internet	Best Actor	Jônatas in Totalmente Demais	Nominated	
2016	Troféu Internet	Best Actor	Jônatas in Totalmente Demais	Nominated	
2016	Prêmio Extra de Televisão	Best Actor	Jônatas in Totalmente Demais	Nominated	
2016	Capricho Awards	Best National Actor	Jônatas in Totalmente Demais	Nominated	
2016	Melhores do Ano	Best Telenovela Actor	Jônatas in Totalmente Demais	Nominated	
2016	Troféu AIB de Imprensa	Best Actor	Jônatas in Totalmente Demais	Won	
2017	Troféu Internet	Best Actor	Jônatas in Totalmente Demais	Nominated	
2020	Meus Prêmios Nick	Male TV Artist	Téo in Salve-se Quem Puder	Nominated	
2020	Troféu Internet	Best Telenovela Actress	Téo in Salve-se Quem Puder	Nominated	
2021	Meus Prêmios Nick	Male TV Artist	Téo in Salve-se Quem Puder	Nominated	
