= Dança dos Famosos season 23 =

Dança dos Famosos
- Season 23
- Hosted by: Luciano Huck
- Judges: Ana Botafogo; Carlinhos de Jesus; Milton Cunha; Zebrinha
- No. of episodes: 18

Release
- Original network: TV Globo
- Original release: August 23, 2026

Season chronology
- ← Previous; Season 22

Dança dos Famosos 2026 is the twentieth-third season of the Brazilian reality television show Dança dos Famosos which premiered on August 23, 2026, at 7:00 / 6:00 p.m. (BRT / AMT) on TV Globo, following a cast reveal special that aired on August 16.

== Couples ==
The first four celebrities, Ticiane Pinheiro, Breno Ferreira, Otaviano Costa and Junno Andrade, were confirmed between August 13 and 14, 2026. The full lineup of celebrities and professionals was unveiled on August 16. Among them were returning celebrity Gracyanne Barbosa, who had competed in the previous season but was forced to withdraw after suffering a knee injury, and MC Livinho, who had also been announced as a contestant for that season but was unable to make his debut after being involved in a motorcycle accident and was replaced before the premiere.

Ticiane Pinheiro and Junno Andrade had previously been involved with Dancing Brasil, Record's adaptation of the Dancing with the Stars format. Ticiane competed in the Dancing Brasil Especial in 2017, where she finished as a co-runner-up, while Junno served as co-host of the fourth season in 2018.

Celebrity	Notability (known for)	Professional	Group	Status	Ref.
Kenya Sade	TV host	Rolon Ho	C	Eliminated 1st on September 13, 2026	
Otaviano Costa	TV host	Rubia Frutuoso	C	Eliminated 2nd on September 13, 2026	
Junno Andrade	Singer & Actor	Dani Duram	D	Eliminated 3rd on October 18, 2026	
Gracyanne Barbosa	Fitness model	Rodrigo Picanço; Rolon Ho (Week 5)	D	Eliminated 4th on October 18, 2026	
Lucas Guedez Returned on November 1	Digital influencer	Gabe Cardoso	B	Eliminated 5th on October 18, 2026	
Rita Guedes	Actress	Adalberto Shock; Jefferson Bilisco (Week 10)	B	Eliminated 6th on October 25, 2026	
Ticiane Pinheiro	TV host	Fernando Perrotti	A	Eliminated 7th on October 25, 2026	
Bruna Griphao Returned on November 1	Actress	Lucas Teo	D	Eliminated 8th on October 25, 2026	
Bianca Andrade	Digital influencer	Heron Leal	A	Participating	
Breno Ferreira	Actor	Jaque Paraense	C	Participating	
Bruna Griphao	Actress	Lucas Teo	D	Participating	
Diego Martins	Actor & Singer	Mayara Araújo	D	Participating	
Giovana Cordeiro	Actress	Diego Basilio	C	Participating	
Léo Foguete	Singer	Thais Sousa	A	Participating	
MC Livinho	Singer	Beatriz Feitosa	B	Participating	
Lucas Guedez	Digital influencer	Gabe Cardoso	B	Participating	
Mell Muzzillo	Actress	Daniel Norton	B	Participating	
Pedro Scooby	Professional surfer	Fernanda Cavalcante	A	Participating	

== Elimination chart ==
Couple	Place	Group stage				Couple stage														
Couple	Place	1	2	3	T	4	5	6	7	8	9	10	11	12	13	14	15	16	17	18
Breno & Jaque		45.5	47.1	49.0	141.6	49.7	—N/a	47.1	—N/a	49.3	—N/a	50.0	—N/a	—N/a	50.0					
Diego & Mayara		46.1	47.2	49.7	143.0	—N/a	—N/a	49.0	—N/a	49.1	—N/a	50.0	—N/a	—N/a	49.7					
Giovana & Diego		45.5	47.1	49.0	141.6	49.7	46.9	—N/a	49.0	—N/a	49.8	—N/a	—N/a	—N/a	50.0					
Léo & Thais		46.3	46.7	49.3	142.3	—N/a	—N/a	46.3	—N/a	48.8	—N/a	49.6	—N/a	49.7	—N/a					
Livinho & Beatriz		45.9	46.7	49.3	141.9	—N/a	47.1	—N/a	49.7	—N/a	50.0	—N/a	—N/a	50.0	—N/a					
Mell & Daniel		45.9	46.7	49.3	141.9	—N/a	—N/a	48.7	—N/a	49.4	—N/a	49.9	—N/a	50.0	—N/a					
Bruna & Teo	7	46.1	47.2	49.7	143.0	—N/a	—N/a	46.9	—N/a	49.2	—N/a	49.5	6/12	—N/a	49.6					
Scooby & Fernanda	8	46.3	46.7	49.3	142.3	—N/a	46.1	—N/a	47.8	—N/a	49.3	—N/a	—N/a	—N/a	49.3					
Bianca & Heron	9	46.3	46.7	49.3	142.3	—N/a	46.3	—N/a	48.6	—N/a	49.1	—N/a	—N/a	49.6						
Lucas & Gabe	10	45.9	46.7	49.3	141.9	—N/a	46.3	—N/a	47.7	—N/a	49.2		4/12	49.2						
Gracyanne & Rodrigo	11	46.1	47.2	49.7	143.0	—N/a	46.9	—N/a	47.3	—N/a	48.9		2/12							
Rita & Adalberto/Bilisco	12	45.9	46.7	49.3	141.9	—N/a	—N/a	45.5	—N/a	48.8	—N/a	48.9	0/12							
Ticiane & Fernando	13	46.3	46.7	49.3	142.3	—N/a	—N/a	45.2	—N/a	48.7	—N/a	49.3	0/12							
Junno & Dani	14	46.1	47.2	49.7	143.0	—N/a	45.9	—N/a	46.2	—N/a	48.7		0/12							
Otaviano & Rubia	15	45.5	47.1	49.0	141.6	49.1														
Kenya & Rolon	16	45.5	47.1	49.0	141.6	49.3														

Lowest score
Highest score
Dance-off
Saved last
Eliminated

Winner
Runner-up
Third place

== Weekly results ==
=== Week 1 ===
Week 1 – Group stage

- Style: Pagode Baiano

Artistic judges		Technical judges		
1	2	3	4	5
Milton Cunha	Mariana Ximenes	Carlinhos de Jesus	Ana Botafogo	Zebrinha

Running order

Group	Judges' score					Total score	Studio score	Week total	Final total	Result
Group	1	2	3	4	5	Total score	Studio score	Week total	Final total	Result
Livinho & Beatriz; Lucas & Gabe; Mell & Daniel; Rita & Adalberto	9.9	10	8.7	8.7	8.6	45.9	9.6	—	55.5	3rd
Bianca & Heron; Léo & Thais; Scooby & Fernanda; Ticiane & Fernando	9.9	10	9.0	8.9	8.5	46.3	9.7	—	56.0	1st
Breno & Jaque; Giovana & Diego; Kenya & Rolon; Otaviano & Rubia (Note: Otaviano Costa was absent from his group's first performance after suffering a grade 2 calf strain during rehearsals.)	9.9	10	8.4	8.7	8.5	45.5	9.7	—	55.2	4th
Bruna & Teo; Diego & Mayara; Gracyanne & Rodrigo; Junno & Dani	9.9	10	9.0	8.6	8.6	46.1	9.5	—	55.6	2nd

=== Week 2 ===
Week 2 – Group stage

- Style: Disco

Artistic judges		Technical judges		
1	2	3	4	5
Milton Cunha	Isabel Teixeira	Carlinhos de Jesus	Ana Botafogo	Zebrinha

Running order

Group	Judges' score					Total score	Studio score	Week total	Final total	Result
Group	1	2	3	4	5	Total score	Studio score	Week total	Final total	Result
Bianca & Heron; Léo & Thais; Scooby & Fernanda; Ticiane & Fernando	9.8	10	8.9	9.0	9.0	46.7	9.5	56.2	112.2	2nd
Bruna & Teo; Diego & Mayara; Gracyanne & Rodrigo; Junno & Dani	9.9	10	8.9	9.2	9.2	47.2	9.8	57.0	112.6	1st
Livinho & Beatriz; Lucas & Gabe; Mell & Daniel; Rita & Adalberto	9.8	10	8.9	9.0	9.0	46.7	9.7	56.4	111.9	3rd
Breno & Jaque; Giovana & Diego; Kenya & Rolon; Otaviano & Rubia	10	10	9.0	9.0	9.1	47.1	9.6	56.7	111.9	3rd

=== Week 3 ===
Week 3 – Group stage

- Style: Freestyle (Michael Jackson Night)

Artistic judges		Technical judges		
1	2	3	4	5
Milton Cunha	Ingrid Guimarães & Mônica Martelli	Carlinhos de Jesus	Ana Botafogo	Zebrinha

Running order

Group	Judges' score					Total score	Studio score	Week total	Final total	Result (week 1–3)
Group	1	2	3	4	5	Total score	Studio score	Week total	Final total	Result (week 1–3)
Bianca & Heron; Léo & Thais; Scooby & Fernanda; Ticiane & Fernando	9.8	9.9	9.8	9.8	10	49.3	9.4	58.7	170.9	3rd
Bruna & Teo; Diego & Mayara; Gracyanne & Rodrigo; Junno & Dani	9.8	10	10	9.9	10	49.7	10	59.7	172.3	1st
Livinho & Beatriz; Lucas & Gabe; Mell & Daniel; Rita & Adalberto	9.8	9.8	9.7	10	10	49.3	9.8	59.1	171.0	2nd
Breno & Jaque; Giovana & Diego; Kenya & Rolon; Otaviano & Rubia	9.7	10	9.8	9.7	9.8	49.0	9.6	58.6	170.5	Dance-off

=== Week 4 ===
Group stage dance-off

- Style: Bachata

Artistic judges		Technical judges		
1	2	3	4	5
Milton Cunha	Marina Ruy Barbosa	Carlinhos de Jesus	Ana Botafogo	Zebrinha

Running order

Group	Judges' score					Total score	Studio score	Week total	Final total	Result
Group	1	2	3	4	5	Total score	Studio score	Week total	Final total	Result
Giovana & Diego	10	10	10	9.9	9.8	49.7	9.8	—N/a	59.5	Advanced
Kenya & Rolon	9.9	10	9.8	9.8	9.8	49.3	9.3	—N/a	58.6	Eliminated
Otaviano & Rubia	9.9	10	9.7	9.8	9.7	49.1	9.7	—N/a	58.8	Eliminated
Breno & Jaque	10	10	9.9	9.9	9.9	49.7	9.9	—N/a	59.6	Advanced

=== Week 5 ===
Week 1 – Group 1

- Style: Funk

Artistic judges		Technical judges		
1	2	3	4	5
Milton Cunha	Anitta	Carlinhos de Jesus	Ana Botafogo	Zebrinha

Running order

Couple	Judges' score					Total score	Studio score	Week total	Final total	Result
Couple	1	2	3	4	5	Total score	Studio score	Week total	Final total	Result
Lucas & Gabe	10	10	8.6	8.9	8.8	46.3	9.7	—N/a	56.0	4th
Bianca & Heron	10	10	8.7	8.8	8.8	46.3	9.7	—N/a	56.0	4th
Pedro & Fernanda	10	10	8.8	8.7	8.6	46.1	9.6	—N/a	55.7	6th
Gracyanne & Rolon (Note: Gracyanne Barbosa performed with Rolon Ho this week, as her original partner, Rodrigo Picanço, was unable to perform due to an injury.)	10	10	8.9	9.0	9.0	46.9	9.6	—N/a	56.5	3rd
Livinho & Beatriz	10	10	8.9	9.1	9.1	47.1	9.8	—N/a	56.9	1st
Giovana & Diego	10	10	9.0	9.0	8.9	46.9	9.7	—N/a	56.6	2nd
Junno & Dani	10	10	8.5	8.7	8.7	45.9	9.8	—N/a	55.7	6th

=== Week 6 ===
Week 2 – Group 2

- Style: Funk

Artistic judges		Technical judges		
1	2	3	4	5
Milton Cunha	Ivete Sangalo	Carlinhos de Jesus	Ana Botafogo	Zebrinha

Running order

Couple	Judges' score					Total score	Studio score	Week total	Final total	Result
Couple	1	2	3	4	5	Total score	Studio score	Week total	Final total	Result
Breno & Jaque	10	10	9.0	9.1	9.0	47.1	9.6	—N/a	56.7	4th
Bruna & Teo	10	10	9.0	8.9	9.0	46.9	9.7	—N/a	56.6	5th
Rita & Adalberto	10	10	8.7	8.9	8.9	45.5	9.4	—N/a	55.9	6th
Léo & Thais	10	10	9.2	9.0	9.1	46.3	9.8	—N/a	57.1	3rd
Ticiane & Fernando	10	10	8.8	8.7	8.7	45.2	9.5	—N/a	55.8	7th
Diego & Mayara	10	10	10	9.5	9.5	49.0	9.8	—N/a	58.8	1st
Mell & Daniel	10	10	10	9.3	9.4	48.7	9.7	—N/a	58.4	2nd

=== Week 7 ===
Week 2 – Group 1

- Style: Forró

Artistic judges		Technical judges		
1	2	3	4	5
Milton Cunha	Alexandre Borges	Carlinhos de Jesus	Ana Botafogo	Zebrinha

Running order

Couple	Judges' score					Total score	Studio score	Gshow score	Week total	Final total	Result
Couple	1	2	3	4	5	Total score	Studio score	Gshow score	Week total	Final total	Result
Junno & Dani	9.8	9.5	8.9	9.0	9.0	46.2	9.5	9.5	65.2	120.9	7th
Gracyanne & Rolon	10	10	9.1	9.1	9.1	47.3	9.5	9.5	66.3	122.8	5th
Livinho & Beatriz	10	10	10	10	9.7	49.7	9.9	9.8	69.4	126.3	1st
Giovana & Diego	10	10	9.7	9.6	9.7	49.0	9.7	9.8	68.5	125.1	2nd
Scooby & Fernanda	9.9	9.7	9.5	9.4	9.3	47.8	9.7	9.6	67.1	122.8	5th
Bianca & Heron	9.9	10	9.5	9.6	9.6	48.6	9.7	9.8	68.1	124.1	3rd
Lucas & Gabe	9.8	10	9.0	9.4	9.5	47.7	9.7	9.9	67.3	123.3	4th

=== Week 8 ===
Week 2 – Group 2

- Style: Forró

Artistic judges		Technical judges		
1	2	3	4	5
Milton Cunha	Angélica	Carlinhos de Jesus	Ana Botafogo	Zebrinha

Running order

Couple	Judges' score					Total score	Studio score	Week total	Final total	Result
Couple	1	2	3	4	5	Total score	Studio score	Week total	Final total	Result
Diego & Jaque	9.9	10	9.8	9.7	9.7	49.1	9.6	58.7	117.5	2nd
Mell & Daniel	10	10	9.7	9.9	9.8	49.4	9.8	59.2	117.6	1st
Léo & Thais	10	10	9.6	9.6	9.6	48.8	9.6	58.4	115.5	5th
Ticiane & Fernando	9.8	10	9.8	9.5	9.6	48.7	9.6	58.3	114.1	7th
Rita & Adalberto	9.8	10	9.6	9.7	9.7	48.8	9.7	58.5	114.4	6th
Breno & Jaque	9.9	10	9.8	9.9	9.7	49.3	9.7	59.0	115.7	3rd
Bruna & Teo	10	10	9.6	9.8	9.8	49.2	9.8	59.0	115.6	4th

=== Week 9 ===
Week 3 – Group 1

- Style: Lindy Hop

Artistic judges		Technical judges		
1	2	3	4	5
Milton Cunha	Jeniffer Nascimento	Carlinhos de Jesus	Ana Botafogo	Zebrinha

Running order

Couple	Judges' score					Total score	Studio score	Gshow score	Week total	Final total	Result (week 5–9)
Couple	1	2	3	4	5	Total score	Studio score	Gshow score	Week total	Final total	Result (week 5–9)
Livinho & Beatriz	10	10	10	10	10	50.0	9.8	10.0	69.8	196.1	1st
Bianca & Heron	9.9	10	9.7	9.7	9.8	49.1	9.4	9.6	68.1	192.2	3rd
Lucas & Gabi	9.8	10	9.8	9.8	9.8	49.2	9.5	9.8	68.5	191.8	Dance-off (5th)
Junno & Dani	9.7	10	9.7	9.7	9.6	48.7	9.3	9.5	67.5	188.4	Dance-off (7th)
Gracyanne & Rodrigo	9.8	10	9.7	9.7	9.7	48.9	9.6	9.5	68.0	190.8	Dance-off (6th)
Scooby & Fernanda	9.9	9.9	9.8	9.9	9.8	49.3	9.9	9.9	69.1	191.9	4th
Giovana & Diego	10	10	9.9	10	9.9	49.8	9.9	9.9	69.6	194.7	2nd

=== Week 10 ===
Week 3 – Group 2

- Style: Rock

Artistic judges		Technical judges		
1	2	3	4	5
Milton Cunha	José Loreto & Nanda Marques	Carlinhos de Jesus	Ana Botafogo	Zebrinha

Running order

Couple	Judges' score					Total score	Studio score	Gshow score	Week total	Final total	Result (week 6–10)
Couple	1	2	3	4	5	Total score	Studio score	Gshow score	Week total	Final total	Result (week 6–10)
Mell & Daniel	10	10	10	9.9	10	49.9	9.7	9.5	69.1	186.7	2nd
Rita & Bilisco (Note: Rita Guedes performed with Jefferson Bilisco this week, as her original partner, Adalberto Shock, was unable to perform due to an injury.)	9.8	10	9.7	9.7	9.7	48.9	9.5	9.1	67.5	181.9	Dance-off (7th)
Ticiane & Fernando	9.9	10	9.8	9.8	9.8	49.3	9.6	9.3	68.2	182.3	Dance-off (6th)
Bruna & Teo	9.9	10	9.9	9.9	9.8	49.5	9.6	9.4	68.5	184.1	Dance-off (5th)
Breno & Jaque	10	10	10	10	10	50.0	9.7	10.0	69.7	185.4	3rd
Léo & Thais	9.9	10	9.9	9.9	9.9	49.6	9.6	9.7	68.9	184.4	4th
Diego & Mayara	10	10	10	10	10	50.0	10.0	9.8	69.8	187.3	1st

=== Week 11 ===
Couple stage dance-off

- Style: Brega Calypso

Artistic judges		Technical judges		
1	2	3	4	5
Milton Cunha	Renato Góes	Carlinhos de Jesus	Ana Botafogo	Zebrinha

Running order

Couple	Judges' votes					Public's vote	Total votes	Result
Couple	1	2	3	4	5	Public's vote	Total votes	Result
Rita & Bilisco							0	Eliminated
Junno & Dani							0	Eliminated
Ticiane & Fernando							0	Eliminated
Bruna & Teo	✔	✔	✔	✔	✔	✔ (41%)	6	Advanced
Gracyanne & Rodrigo	✔				✔		2	Eliminated
Lucas & Gabi		✔	✔	✔		✔ (24%)	4	Advanced
