= Dança dos Famosos season 20 =

Dança dos Famosos
- Season 20
- Hosted by: Luciano Huck
- Judges: Ana Botafogo; Carlinhos de Jesus; Zebrinha
- Celebrity winner: Priscila Fantin
- Professional winner: Rolon Ho
- No. of episodes: 16

Release
- Original network: TV Globo
- Original release: March 19 – July 2, 2023

Season chronology
- ← Previous; Season 19 Next → Season 21

Dança dos Famosos 2023 is the twentieth season of the Brazilian reality television show Dança dos Famosos which premiered on March 19, 2023, at 7:30 / 6:30 p.m. (BRT / AMT) on TV Globo, following a cast reveal special that aired on March 12.

On March 6, 2023, host Luciano Huck announced that some changes were added this season, including a larger cast of 16 celebrities, group performances and new dance styles.

On July 2, 2023, actress Priscila Fantin & Rolon Ho won the competition over actress Carla Diaz & Diego Basilio and digital influencer Rafa Kalimann & Fernando Perrotti, who took 2nd and 3rd place respectively. Priscila is the first celebrity to win the show after being eliminated in the same season.

== Couples ==
The first two celebrities (Guito and Heloísa Périssé) were confirmed on March 9, 2023. The full lineup of celebrities and professionals were unveiled on March 12.

Celebrity	Notability (known for)	Professional	Group	Status	Ref.
Guito	Singer & actor	Mariana Gomes	D	Eliminated 1st on April 2, 2023	
Linn da Quebrada	Singer & LGBT activist	Hugo Frade	D	Eliminated 2nd on April 2, 2023	
Gabi Melim	Singer	Jefferson Bilisco	A	Eliminated 3rd on May 7, 2023	
Heloísa Périssé Returned on May 21	Actress	Leandro Azevedo	A	Eliminated 4th on May 7, 2023	
Rafa Kalimann Returned on May 21	Digital influencer	Fernando Perrotti	B	Eliminated 5th on May 7, 2023	
Priscila Fantin Returned on May 21	Actress	Rolon Ho	D	Eliminated 6th on May 7, 2023	
Rafael Infante	Comedian	Mariana Torres	A	Eliminated 7th on May 14, 2023	
Bruno Garcia	Actor	Gabe Cardoso	B	Eliminated 8th on May 14, 2023	
Thiago Oliveira	TV host	Hadassa Baptista	B	Eliminated 9th on May 14, 2023	
Nattan Returned on May 21	Singer	Bia Marques	D	Eliminated 10th on May 14, 2023	
Nattan	Singer	Bia Marques	D	Eliminated 11th on May 28, 2023	
Juliana Alves	Actress	Bruno Diaz	C	Eliminated 12th on May 28, 2023	
Heloísa Périssé	Actress	Leandro Azevedo; Hugo Frade (week 12)	A	Eliminated 13th on June 4, 2023	
Douglas Silva	Actor	Aline Ramos	C	Eliminated 14th on June 4, 2023	
Daiane dos Santos	Olympic gymnast	Dani Norton	B	Eliminated 15th on June 11, 2023	
Belo	Singer	Camila Lobo	C	Eliminated 16th on June 18, 2023	
Bruno Cabrerizo	Actor	Ju Paiva	A	Eliminated 17th on June 25, 2023	
Rafa Kalimann	Digital influencer	Fernando Perrotti	B	Third place on July 2, 2022	
Carla Diaz	Actress	Diego Basilio	C	Runner-up on July 2, 2023	
Priscila Fantin	Actress	Rolon Ho	D	Winner on July 2, 2023	

== Elimination chart ==
Couple	Place	Group stage			3	4	5	6	7	8	4+6+8	9	5+7+9	10	11	12	13	14	15	14+15	16
Couple	Place	1	2	T	3	4	5	6	7	8	4+6+8	9	5+7+9	10	11	12	13	14	15	14+15	16
Priscila & Rolon	1	48.8	49.4	98.3	49.3	45.1	—N/a	46.3	—N/a	46.7				48.6	—N/a	48.8	48.8	49.2	49.4	98.6	99.9
Carla & Diego	2	49.2	49.7	98.9	—N/a	45.6	—N/a	46.0	—N/a	46.8	data-sort-value="" style="background: var(--background-color-interactive, #ececec); color: var(--color-base, inherit); vertical-align: middle; text-align: center; " class="table-na" | —N/a	data-sort-value="" style="background: var(--background-color-interactive, #ececec); color: var(--color-base, inherit); vertical-align: middle; text-align: center; " class="table-na" | —N/a	48.4	—N/a	48.6	49.2	49.6		99.5		
Rafa & Fernando	3	49.1	49.4	98.5	—N/a	45.4	—N/a	46.2	—N/a	46.6				48.5	—N/a	48.7	48.9	49.2	49.6		99.7
Bruno & Ju	4	48.9	49.3	98.2	—N/a	—N/a	46.1	—N/a	46.3	—N/a		47.1	data-sort-value="" style="background: var(--background-color-interactive, #ececec); color: var(--color-base, inherit); vertical-align: middle; text-align: center; " class="table-na" | —N/a	48.9	—N/a	48.8	49.1	49.4	98.5		
Belo & Camila	5	49.2	49.7	98.9	—N/a	46.0	—N/a	46.2	—N/a	47.1	data-sort-value="" style="background: var(--background-color-interactive, #ececec); color: var(--color-base, inherit); vertical-align: middle; text-align: center; " class="table-na" | —N/a	data-sort-value="" style="background: var(--background-color-interactive, #ececec); color: var(--color-base, inherit); vertical-align: middle; text-align: center; " class="table-na" | —N/a	48.6	48.6	49.0						
Daiane & Dani	6	49.1	49.4	98.5	—N/a	45.3	—N/a	45.7	—N/a	49.1	data-sort-value="" style="background: var(--background-color-interactive, #ececec); color: var(--color-base, inherit); vertical-align: middle; text-align: center; " class="table-na" | —N/a	data-sort-value="" style="background: var(--background-color-interactive, #ececec); color: var(--color-base, inherit); vertical-align: middle; text-align: center; " class="table-na" | —N/a	48.5	—N/a	48.6						
Douglas & Aline	7	49.2	49.7	98.9	—N/a	—N/a	—N/a	45.3	—N/a	46.1	data-sort-value="" style="background: var(--background-color-interactive, #ececec); color: var(--color-base, inherit); vertical-align: middle; text-align: center; " class="table-na" | —N/a		47.5	—N/a	—N/a	48.4					
Heloísa & Leandro	8	48.9	49.3	98.2	—N/a	45.3	—N/a	45.7	—N/a	46.7				48.0	—N/a	48.1					
Juliana & Bruno	9	49.2	49.7	98.9	—N/a	45.5	—N/a	46.1	—N/a	46.8	data-sort-value="" style="background: var(--background-color-interactive, #ececec); color: var(--color-base, inherit); vertical-align: middle; text-align: center; " class="table-na" | —N/a	data-sort-value="" style="background: var(--background-color-interactive, #ececec); color: var(--color-base, inherit); vertical-align: middle; text-align: center; " class="table-na" | —N/a	48.4								
Nattan & Bia	10	48.8	49.4	98.3	49.5	—N/a	45.4	—N/a	46.2	—N/a		46.8								48.2	47.9
Gabi & Jefferson	11	48.9	49.3	98.2	—N/a	45.1	—N/a	46.2	—N/a	46.5				47.9							
Rafael & Mariana	12	48.9	49.3	98.2	—N/a	—N/a	45.2	—N/a	45.8	—N/a		46.6		47.8							
Bruno & Gabe	13	49.1	49.4	98.5	—N/a	—N/a	45.1	—N/a	45.8	—N/a		46.8		47.6							
Thiago & Hadassa	14	49.1	49.4	98.5	—N/a	—N/a	45.2	—N/a	46.2	—N/a		46.7		47.6							
Linn & Hugo	15	48.8	49.4	98.3	49.2																
Guito & Mariana	16	48.8	49.4	98.3	49.1																

Lowest score
Highest score
Dance-off
Saved last
Eliminated

Winner
Runner-up
Third place

== Weekly results ==
=== Week 1 ===
Week 1 – Group stage

- Style: Disco

Artistic judges		Technical judges		
1	2	3	4	5
Lore Improta & Léo Santana	Marina Ruy Barbosa	Carlinhos de Jesus	Ana Botafogo	Zebrinha

Running order

Group	Judges' score					Total score	Studio score	Week total	Final total	Result
Group	1	2	3	4	5	Total score	Studio score	Week total	Final total	Result
Bruno & Ju; Gabi & Jefferson; Heloísa & Leandro; Rafael & Mariana	10	10	9.8	9.8	9.3	48.9	9.9	—N/a	58.8	3rd
Guito & Mariana; Linn & Hugo; Nattan & Bia; Priscila & Rolon	10	10	9.6	9.6	9.6	48.8	9.8	—N/a	58.6	4th
Belo & Camila; Carla & Diego; Douglas & Aline; Juliana & Bruno	10	10	9.7	9.8	9.7	49.2	9.9	—N/a	59.1	1st
Bruno & Gabe; Daiane & Dani; Rafa & Fernando; Thiago & Hadassa	10	10	9.8	9.7	9.6	49.1	9.9	—N/a	59.0	2nd

=== Week 2 ===
Week 2 – Group stage

- Style: Street

Artistic judges		Technical judges		
1	2	3	4	5
José Loreto	Sheron Menezzes	Carlinhos de Jesus	Ana Botafogo	Zebrinha

Running order

Group	Judges' score					Total score	Studio score	Week total	Final total	Result
Group	1	2	3	4	5	Total score	Studio score	Week total	Final total	Result
Belo & Camila; Carla & Diego; Douglas & Aline; Juliana & Bruno	10	10	9.9	9.9	9.9	49.7	10	59.7	118.8	1st
Bruno & Ju; Gabi & Jefferson; Heloísa & Leandro; Rafael & Mariana	10	10	9.8	9.7	9.8	49.3	9.9	59.2	118.0	3rd
Bruno & Gabe; Daiane & Dani; Rafa & Fernando; Thiago & Hadassa	10	10	9.8	9.8	9.8	49.4	9.9	59.3	118.3	2nd
Guito & Mariana; Linn & Hugo; Nattan & Bia; Priscila & Rolon	10	10	9.8	9.8	9.8	49.4	9.9	59.3	117.9	Dance-off

=== Week 3 ===
Group stage dance-off

- Style: Piseiro

Artistic judges		Technical judges		
1	2	3	4	5
Rafael Portugal	Maria Beltrão	Carlinhos de Jesus	Ana Botafogo	Zebrinha

Running order

Couple	Judges' score					Total score	Studio score	Week total	Final total	Result
Couple	1	2	3	4	5	Total score	Studio score	Week total	Final total	Result
Guito & Mariana	10	10	9.7	9.7	9.7	49.1	9.9	—N/a	59.0	Eliminated (M)
Linn & Hugo	10	10	9.7	9.7	9.8	49.2	9.8	—N/a	59.0	Eliminated (W)
Nattan & Bia	10	10	9.8	9.9	9.8	49.5	10	—N/a	59.5	Advanced (M)
Priscila & Rolon	10	10	9.8	9.8	9.7	49.3	9.9	—N/a	59.2	Advanced (W)

=== Week 4 ===
Week 1 – Women

- Style: Zouk

Artistic judges		Technical judges		
1	2	3	4	5
Thalita Carauta	Carolina Dieckmann	Carlinhos de Jesus	Ana Botafogo	Zebrinha

Running order

Couple	Judges' score					Total score	Studio score	Week total	Final total	Result
Couple	1	2	3	4	5	Total score	Studio score	Week total	Final total	Result
Priscila & Rolon	10	10	8.4	8.4	8.3	45.1	9.9	—N/a	55.0	6th
Gabi & Jefferson	10	10	8.3	8.4	8.4	45.1	9.9	—N/a	55.0	6th
Juliana & Bruno	10	10	8.5	8.5	8.5	45.5	9.9	—N/a	55.4	2nd
Heloísa & Leandro	10	10	8.4	8.4	8.5	45.3	10	—N/a	55.3	3rd
Rafa & Fernando	10	10	8.4	8.5	8.5	45.4	9.9	—N/a	55.3	3rd
Daiane & Dani	10	10	8.4	8.5	8.4	45.3	10	—N/a	55.3	3rd
Carla & Diego	10	10	8.4	8.6	8.6	45.6	10	—N/a	55.6	1st

=== Week 5 ===
Week 1 – Men

- Style: Lambada

Artistic judges		Technical judges		
1	2	3	4	5
Dilsinho	Sophie Charlotte	Carlinhos de Jesus	Ana Botafogo	Zebrinha

Running order

Couple	Judges' score					Total score	Studio score	Week total	Final total	Result
Couple	1	2	3	4	5	Total score	Studio score	Week total	Final total	Result
Rafael & Mariana	10	10	8.4	8.4	8.4	45.2	9.9	—N/a	55.1	5th
Thiago & Hadassa	10	10	8.3	8.5	8.4	45.2	9.9	—N/a	55.1	5th
Belo & Camila	10	10	8.7	8.6	8.7	46.0	10	—N/a	56.0	2nd
Nattan & Bia	10	10	8.3	8.6	8.5	45.4	9.8	—N/a	55.2	3rd
Douglas & Aline	10	10	8.4	8.4	8.5	45.3	9.9	—N/a	55.2	3rd
Bruno & Gabe	10	10	8.3	8.4	8.4	45.1	9.9	—N/a	55.0	7th
Bruno & Ju	10	10	8.8	8.7	8.6	46.1	10	—N/a	56.1	1st

=== Week 6 ===
Week 2 – Women

- Style: Lindy Hop

Artistic judges		Technical judges		
1	2	3	4	5
Sandra Annenberg	Fátima Bernardes	Carlinhos de Jesus	Ana Botafogo	Zebrinha

Running order

Couple	Judges' score					Total score	Studio score	Week total	Final total	Result
Couple	1	2	3	4	5	Total score	Studio score	Week total	Final total	Result
Daiane & Dani	10	10	8.5	8.6	8.6	45.7	9.9	55.6	110.9	7th
Heloísa & Leandro	10	10	8.5	8.5	8.7	45.7	10	55.7	111.0	6th
Carla & Diego	10	10	8.5	8.8	8.7	46.0	10	56.0	111.6	1st
Gabi & Jefferson	10	10	8.7	8.8	8.7	46.2	10	56.2	111.2	4th
Priscila & Rolon	10	10	8.8	8.7	8.8	46.3	9.9	56.2	111.2	4th
Juliana & Bruno	10	10	8.6	8.7	8.8	46.1	9.9	56.0	111.4	2nd
Rafa & Fernando	10	10	8.8	8.7	8.7	46.2	9.9	56.1	111.4	2nd

=== Week 7 ===
Week 2 – Men

- Style: Rock

Artistic judges		Technical judges		
1	2	3	4	5
Juliette	Deborah Secco	Carlinhos de Jesus	Ana Botafogo	Zebrinha

Running order

Couple	Judges' score					Total score	Studio score	Week total	Final total	Result
Couple	1	2	3	4	5	Total score	Studio score	Week total	Final total	Result
Bruno & Ju	10	10	8.8	8.8	8.7	46.3	9.9	56.2	112.3	1st
Belo & Camila	10	10	8.7	8.8	8.7	46.2	10	56.2	112.2	2nd
Bruno & Gabe	10	10	8.6	8.6	8.6	45.8	9.9	55.7	110.7	7th
Rafael & Mariana	10	10	8.7	8.6	8.5	45.8	9.9	55.7	110.8	6th
Thiago & Hadassa	10	10	8.7	8.8	8.7	46.2	9.9	56.1	111.2	5th
Nattan & Bia	10	10	8.8	8.7	8.7	46.2	9.9	56.1	113.3	3rd
Douglas & Aline	10	10	8.7	8.7	8.7	46.1	10	56.1	111.3	3rd

=== Week 8 ===
Week 3 – Women

- Style: New School Funk

Artistic judges		Technical judges		
1	2	3	4	5
Glória Pires	Susana Vieira	Carlinhos de Jesus	Ana Botafogo	Zebrinha

Running order

Couple	Judges' score					Total score	Studio score	Week total	Final total	Result (week 4–8)
Couple	1	2	3	4	5	Total score	Studio score	Week total	Final total	Result (week 4–8)
Carla & Diego	10	10	8.9	9.0	8.9	46.8	9.9	56.7	168.3	2nd
Juliana & Bruno	10	10	8.8	9.0	9.0	46.8	9.9	56.7	168.1	3rd
Heloísa & Leandro	10	10	8.9	8.9	8.9	46.7	10	56.7	167.7	Dance-off
Priscila & Rolon	10	10	8.9	8.9	8.9	46.7	10	56.7	167.9	Dance-off
Rafa & Fernando	10	10	8.9	8.9	8.8	46.6	9.9	56.5	167.9	Dance-off
Gabi & Jefferson	10	10	8.8	8.9	8.8	46.5	9.9	56.4	167.6	Dance-off
Daiane & Dani	10	10	10	10	9.1	49.1	10	59.1	170.0	1st

=== Week 9 ===
Week 3 – Men

- Style: Old School Funk

Artistic judges		Technical judges		
1	2	3	4	5
Paulo Vieira	Cláudia Abreu	Carlinhos de Jesus	Ana Botafogo	Zebrinha

Running order

Couple	Judges' score					Total score	Studio score	Week total	Final total	Result (week 5–9)
Couple	1	2	3	4	5	Total score	Studio score	Week total	Final total	Result (week 5–9)
Thiago & Hadassa	10	10	8.9	8.9	8.9	46.7	9.9	56.6	167.8	Dance-off
Nattan & Bia	10	10	8.8	9.0	9.0	46.8	9.9	56.7	168.0	Dance-off
Rafael & Mariana	10	10	8.9	8.9	8.8	46.6	9.9	56.5	167.3	Dance-off
Bruno & Gabe	10	10	9.0	8.9	8.9	46.8	9.9	56.7	167.4	Dance-off
Douglas & Aline	10	10	9.2	9.1	9.2	47.5	10	57.5	168.8	3rd
Bruno & Ju	10	10	9.1	9.0	9.0	47.1	9.9	57.0	169.3	1st
Belo & Camila	10	10	9.1	9.0	9.0	47.1	10	57.1	169.3	1st

=== Week 10 ===
Couple stage dance-off

- Style: Tecno Brega

Artistic judges		Technical judges		
1	2	3	4	5
Antônio Fagundes	Andréia Sadi	Carlinhos de Jesus	Ana Botafogo	Zebrinha

Running order

Couple	Judges' score					Total score	Studio score	Week total	Final total	Result
Couple	1	2	3	4	5	Total score	Studio score	Week total	Final total	Result
Nattan & Bia	10	10	9.4	9.4	9.4	48.2	9.9	—N/a	58.1	Advanced
Gabi & Jefferson	10	10	9.3	9.3	9.3	47.9	9.9	—N/a	57.8	Eliminated
Thiago & Hadassa	10	10	9.2	9.2	9.2	47.6	9.9	—N/a	57.5	Eliminated
Heloísa & Leandro	10	10	9.4	9.3	9.3	48.0	9.9	—N/a	57.9	Advanced
Bruno & Gabe	10	10	9.2	9.2	9.2	47.6	9.9	—N/a	57.5	Eliminated
Rafa & Fernando	10	10	9.4	9.5	9.5	48.4	10	—N/a	58.4	Advanced
Rafael & Mariana	10	10	9.2	9.3	9.3	47.8	9.9	—N/a	57.7	Eliminated
Priscila & Rolon	10	10	9.6	9.5	9.5	48.6	10	—N/a	58.6	Advanced

=== Week 11 ===
Group 1

- Style: Salsa

Artistic judges		Technical judges		
1	2	3	4	5
Wanessa	Sandy	Carlinhos de Jesus	Ana Botafogo	Zebrinha

Running order

Couple	Judges' score					Total score	Studio score	Week total	Final total	Result
Couple	1	2	3	4	5	Total score	Studio score	Week total	Final total	Result
Juliana & Bruno	10	10	9.5	9.4	9.5	48.4	9.9	—N/a	58.3	Eliminated
Nattan & Bia	9.9	9.9	9.3	9.4	9.4	47.9	9.9	—N/a	57.8	Eliminated
Daiane & Dani	10	10	9.5	9.5	9.5	48.5	10	—N/a	58.5	2nd
Carla & Diego	10	10	9.5	9.5	9.4	48.4	10	—N/a	58.4	3rd
Bruno & Ju	10	10	9.5	9.8	9.6	48.9	10	—N/a	58.9	1st

=== Week 12 ===
Group 2

- Style: Salsa

Artistic judges		Technical judges		
1	2	3	4	5
Eduardo Sterblitch	Renata Lo Prete	Carlinhos de Jesus	Ana Botafogo	Zebrinha

Running order

Couple	Judges' score					Total score	Studio score	Week total	Final total	Result
Couple	1	2	3	4	5	Total score	Studio score	Week total	Final total	Result
Heloísa & Hugo	10	10	9.3	9.4	9.4	48.1	9.9	—N/a	58.0	Eliminated
Rafa & Fernando	10	10	9.6	9.6	9.5	48.7	9.9	—N/a	58.6	2nd
Douglas & Aline	10	10	9.4	9.5	9.5	48.4	9.9	—N/a	58.3	Eliminated
Priscila & Rolon	10	10	9.6	9.6	9.6	48.8	10	—N/a	58.8	1st
Belo & Camila	10	10	9.5	9.5	9.6	48.6	10	—N/a	58.6	2nd

=== Week 13 ===
Top 6

- Style: Foxtrot

Artistic judges		Technical judges		
1	2	3	4	5
Renato Góes & Thaila Ayala	Rodrigo Simas & Agatha Moreira	Carlinhos de Jesus	Ana Botafogo	Zebrinha

Running order

Couple	Judges' score					Total score	Studio score	Week total	Final total	Result
Couple	1	2	3	4	5	Total score	Studio score	Week total	Final total	Result
Bruno & Ju	10	10	9.6	9.6	9.6	48.8	9.8	—N/a	58.6	3rd
Priscila & Rolon	10	10	9.6	9.6	9.6	48.8	9.9	—N/a	58.7	2nd
Daiane & Dani	10	10	9.5	9.5	9.6	48.6	9.9	—N/a	58.5	Bottom three
Belo & Camila	10	10	9.5	9.5	9.6	48.6	9.9	—N/a	58.5	Bottom three
Rafa & Fernando	10	10	9.6	9.7	9.6	48.9	9.9	—N/a	58.8	1st
Carla & Diego	10	10	9.6	9.5	9.5	48.6	9.9	—N/a	58.5	Bottom three
Bottom three results
Daiane & Dani	With three couples tied in the final total, the studio audience was asked to vote for their favourite couple. Daiane & Dani were eliminated as the couple with the fewest votes to save.								25.18%	Eliminated
Belo & Camila	With three couples tied in the final total, the studio audience was asked to vote for their favourite couple. Daiane & Dani were eliminated as the couple with the fewest votes to save.								34.67%	5th
Carla & Diego	With three couples tied in the final total, the studio audience was asked to vote for their favourite couple. Daiane & Dani were eliminated as the couple with the fewest votes to save.								40.15%	4th

=== Week 14 ===
Top 5

- Style: Waltz

Artistic judges		Technical judges		
1	2	3	4	5
Bárbara Reis	Simone Mendes	Carlinhos de Jesus	Ana Botafogo	Zebrinha

Running order

Couple	Judges' score					Total score	Studio score	Week total	Final total	Result
Couple	1	2	3	4	5	Total score	Studio score	Week total	Final total	Result
Belo & Camila	10	10	9.7	9.7	9.6	49.0	10	59.0	117.5	Eliminated
Rafa & Fernando	10	10	9.7	9.8	9.7	49.2	10	59.2	118.0	1st
Carla & Diego	10	10	9.7	9.8	9.7	49.2	10	59.2	117.7	3rd
Priscila & Rolon	10	10	9.7	9.8	9.7	49.2	9.9	59.1	117.8	2nd
Bruno & Ju	10	10	9.7	9.7	9.7	49.1	9.9	59.0	117.6	4th

=== Week 15 ===
Top 4 – Semifinals

- Style: Contemporary

Artistic judges		Technical judges		
1	2	3	4	5
Bruno Gagliasso	Ingrid Guimarães	Carlinhos de Jesus	Ana Botafogo	Zebrinha

Running order

Couple	Judges' score					Total score	Studio score	Week total	Final total	Result
Couple	1	2	3	4	5	Total score	Studio score	Week total	Final total	Result
Rafa & Fernando	10	10	9.9	9.9	9.8	49.6	9.9	59.5	177.5	1st (Finalist)
Priscila & Rolon	10	10	9.9	9.9	9.7	49.5	9.9	59.4	177.2	3rd (Finalist)
Bruno & Ju	10	10	9.8	9.8	9.8	49.4	10	59.4	177.0	Eliminated
Carla & Diego	10	10	9.9	9.9	9.8	49.6	10	59.6	177.3	2nd (Finalist)

=== Week 16 ===
Top 3 – Finals

- Styles: Tango & Samba

Artistic judges		Technical judges		
1	2	3	4	5
Vitória Strada	Paolla Oliveira	Carlinhos de Jesus	Ana Botafogo	Zebrinha

Running order

Tango
Couple	Judges' score					Total score	Studio score	Gshow score	Dance total	Final total	Result
Couple	1	2	3	4	5	Total score	Studio score	Gshow score	Dance total	Final total	Result
Rafa & Fernando	10	10	9.9	9.9	9.9	49.7	10	9.8	69.5	—	N/A
Carla & Diego	10	10	9.8	9.9	9.9	49.6	10	9.9	69.5	—	N/A
Priscila & Rolon	10	10	9.9	10	10	49.9	10	9.9	69.8	—	N/A

Samba
Couple	Judges' score					Total score	Studio score	Gshow score	Dance total	Final total	Result
Couple	1	2	3	4	5	Total score	Studio score	Gshow score	Dance total	Final total	Result
Rafa & Fernando	10	10	10	10	10	50.0	9.9	9.8	69.7	139.2	Third place
Carla & Diego	10	10	9.9	10	10	49.9	9.9	10	69.8	139.3	Runner-up
Priscila & Rolon	10	10	10	10	10	50.0	9.9	9.9	69.8	139.6	Winner
