= Dança dos Famosos season 22 =

Dança dos Famosos
- Season 22
- Hosted by: Luciano Huck
- Judges: Ana Botafogo; Carlinhos de Jesus; Milton Cunha; Zebrinha
- Celebrity winner: Silvero Pereira
- Professional winner: Thais Souza
- No. of episodes: 18

Release
- Original network: TV Globo
- Original release: August 10 – December 7, 2025

Season chronology
- ← Previous; Season 21

Dança dos Famosos 2025 was the twentieth-second season of the Brazilian reality television show Dança dos Famosos which premiered on August 10, 2025, at 7:00 / 6:00 p.m. (BRT / AMT) on TV Globo, following a cast reveal special that aired on August 3. This season marked the show's twentieth anniversary and introduced Milton Cunha as the permanent artistic judge.

On December 7, 2025, actor Silvero Pereira & Thais Souza won the competition over singer Wanessa Camargo & Diego Basilio and singer Manu Bahtidão & Heron Leal, who took 2nd and 3rd place respectively.

== Couples ==
The first two celebrities, Wanessa Camargo and Álvaro Xaro, were confirmed on August 1, 2025, followed by Duda Santos and David Junior, who were announced the next day, on August 2. The full lineup of celebrities and professionals was unveiled on August 3. On August 6, 2025, MC Livinho withdrew from the competition due to injuries from a late July motorcycle accident. Lucas Leto replaced him on the August 10 season premiere.

Richarlyson and Allan Souza Lima previously competed on Dancing Brasil, Record's adaptation of the Dancing with the Stars format; Richarlyson in 2017 (Season 1) and Allan in 2018 (Season 4). They became the third and fourth celebrities to appear in both versions of the show, following Micael Borges and Lexa, who had competed the season before. In their Dancing Brasil appearances, Richarlyson was eliminated in week 5, finishing in tenth place, while Allan was a finalist, placing third.

| Celebrity | Notability (known for) | Professional | Group | Status | Ref. |
|---|---|---|---|---|---|
| Catia Fonseca | TV host | Luca Carvalho | C | Eliminated 1st on August 31, 2025 | |
| Fernanda Paes Leme | Actress | Dudu Rangel | B | Eliminated 2nd on August 31, 2025 | |
| Gracyanne Barbosa | Fitness model | Lynekee Ayres | A | Withdrew on October 5, 2025 | |
| Luan Pereira | Singer | Mariana Fernandes | B | Eliminated 3rd on October 5, 2025 | |
| Álvaro Xaro Returned on October 19 | Digital influencer | Mariana Torres | D | Eliminated 4th on October 5, 2025 | |
| Wanessa Camargo Returned on October 19 | Singer | Diego Basilio | D | Eliminated 5th on October 5, 2025 | |
| Nicole Bahls Returned on October 19 | TV personality | Fernando Perrotti | B | Eliminated 6th on October 5, 2025 | |
| Tereza Seiblitz | Actress | Jefferson Bilisco | D | Eliminated 7th on October 12, 2025 | |
| Rodrigo Faro | TV host | Larissa Parison | A | Eliminated 8th on October 12, 2025 | |
| Richarlyson Returned on October 19 | Former football player | Monique Santos | C | Eliminated 10th on October 12, 2025 | |
| Lucas Leto | Actor | Mayara Araújo | D | Eliminated 11th on October 26, 2025 | |
| Duda Santos | Actress | Daniel Norton | A | Eliminated 12th on November 2, 2025 | |
| Allan Souza Lima | Actor | Gabe Cardoso; Aline Ramos (Week 7) | C | Eliminated 13th on November 9, 2025 | |
| Nicole Bahls | TV personality | Fernando Perrotti | B | Eliminated 14th on November 9, 2025 | |
| Richarlyson | Former football player | Monique Santos | C | Eliminated 15th on November 16, 2025 | |
| Álvaro Xaro | Digital influencer | Mariana Torres | D | Eliminated 16th on November 23, 2025 | |
| David Junior | Actor | Jaque Paraense | B | Eliminated 17th on November 30, 2025 | |
| Manu Bahtidão | Singer | Heron Leal | C | Third place on December 7, 2025 | |
| Wanessa Camargo | Singer | Diego Basilio | D | Runner-up on December 7, 2025 | |
| Silvero Pereira | Actor | Thais Souza | A | Winner on December 7, 2025 | |

== Elimination chart ==
| Couple | Place | Group stage | | | | Couple stage | | | | | | | | | | | | | | |
| Couple | Place | 1 | 2 | 3 | T | 4 | 5 | 6 | 7 | 8 | 9 | 10 | 11 | 12 | 13 | 14 | 15 | 16 | 17 | 18 |
|---|---|---|---|---|---|---|---|---|---|---|---|---|---|---|---|---|---|---|---|---|
| Silvero & Thais | 1 | 45.8 | 45.9 | 47.0 | 138.7 | —N/a | —N/a | 46.4 | —N/a | 47.7 | —N/a | 50.0 | —N/a | —N/a | 48.7 | 49.0 | 49.2 | 49.4 | 49.9 | 120.0 |
| Wanessa & Diego | 2 | 45.4 | 45.6 | 46.4 | 137.4 | —N/a | 45.4 | —N/a | 45.6 | —N/a | 49.0 | | 1/4 | —N/a | 48.3 | 48.7 | 49.3 | 49.4 | 49.9 | 119.3 |
| Manu & Heron | 3 | 45.1 | 45.0 | 46.4 | 136.5 | 39.2 | 45.8 | —N/a | 46.1 | —N/a | 49.0 | —N/a | —N/a | 48.3 | —N/a | 48.4 | 49.2 | 49.3 | 49.9 | 119.2 |
| David & Jaque | 4 | 44.6 | 45.2 | 46.2 | 136.0 | 39.4 | —N/a | 45.9 | —N/a | 46.8 | —N/a | 49.8 | —N/a | 48.5 | —N/a | 48.7 | 49.1 | 49.7 | 49.9 | |
| Álvaro & Mariana | 5 | 45.4 | 45.6 | 46.4 | 137.4 | —N/a | 44.7 | —N/a | 45.5 | —N/a | 49.5 | | 1/4 | —N/a | 48.2 | 48.5 | 48.6 | 48.6 | | |
| Richarlyson & Monique | 6 | 45.1 | 45.0 | 46.4 | 136.5 | 38.9 | —N/a | 45.4 | —N/a | 46.4 | —N/a | 49.7 | 1/4 | 47.9 | —N/a | 48.9 | 48.7 | | | |
| Nicole & Fernando | 7 | 44.6 | 45.2 | 46.2 | 136.0 | 39.0 | 45.5 | —N/a | 46.0 | —N/a | 48.6 | | 1/4 | 47.0 | —N/a | 48.1 | | | | |
| Allan & Gabe | 8 | 45.1 | 45.0 | 46.4 | 136.5 | 39.9 | 46.0 | —N/a | 45.8 | —N/a | 49.4 | —N/a | —N/a | —N/a | 48.7 | 48.5 | | | | |
| Duda & Daniel | 9 | 45.8 | 45.9 | 47.0 | 138.7 | —N/a | —N/a | 45.8 | —N/a | 46.5 | —N/a | 50.0 | —N/a | —N/a | 48.1 | | | | | |
| Lucas & Mayara | 10 | 45.4 | 45.6 | 46.4 | 137.4 | —N/a | 45.5 | —N/a | 45.6 | —N/a | 50.0 | —N/a | —N/a | 47.0 | | | | | | |
| Rodrigo & Larissa | 11 | 45.8 | 45.9 | 47.0 | 138.7 | —N/a | —N/a | 45.3 | —N/a | 45.7 | —N/a | 49.0 | 0/4 | | | | | | | |
| Tereza & Bilisco | 12 | 45.4 | 45.6 | 46.4 | 137.4 | —N/a | —N/a | 45.2 | —N/a | 45.9 | —N/a | 48.4 | 0/4 | | | | | | | |
| Luan & Mariana | 13 | 44.6 | 45.2 | 46.2 | 136.0 | 38.4 | 44.7 | —N/a | 45.1 | —N/a | 48.4 | | — | | | | | | | |
| Gracyanne & Lynekee | 14 | 45.8 | 45.9 | 47.0 | 138.7 | —N/a | —N/a | 45.4 | —N/a | 45.7 | — | | | | | | | | | |
| Fernanda & Dudu | 15 | 44.6 | 45.2 | 46.2 | 136.0 | 38.4 | | | | | | | | | | | | | | |
| Catia & Luca | 16 | 45.1 | 45.0 | 46.4 | 136.5 | 37.6 | | | | | | | | | | | | | | |

Lowest score
Highest score
Dance-off
Saved last
Eliminated
Withdrew

Winner
Runner-up
Third place

== Weekly results ==
=== Week 1 ===
Week 1 – Group stage

- Style: Axé

| Artistic judges | | Technical judges | | |
| 1 | 2 | 3 | 4 | 5 |
|---|---|---|---|---|
| Milton Cunha | Deborah Secco | Carlinhos de Jesus | Ana Botafogo | Zebrinha |

Running order

| Group | Judges' score | | | | | Total score | Studio score | Week total | Final total | Result |
| Group | 1 | 2 | 3 | 4 | 5 | Total score | Studio score | Week total | Final total | Result |
|---|---|---|---|---|---|---|---|---|---|---|
| Allan & Gabe; Catia & Luca; Manu & Heron; Richarlyson & Monique | 9.8 | 10 | 8.3 | 8.5 | 8.5 | 45.1 | 8.9 | — | 54.0 | 3rd |
| David & Jaque; Fernanda & Dudu; Luan & Mariana; Nicole & Fernando | 9.6 | 10 | 8.2 | 8.4 | 8.4 | 44.6 | 9.0 | — | 53.6 | 4th |
| Duda & Daniel; Gracyanne & Lynekee; Rodrigo & Larissa; Silvero & Thais | 9.9 | 10 | 8.5 | 8.7 | 8.7 | 45.8 | 9.8 | — | 55.6 | 1st |
| Álvaro & Mariana; Lucas & Mayara; Tereza & Bilisco; Wanessa & Diego | 9.9 | 10 | 8.4 | 8.6 | 8.5 | 45.4 | 9.6 | — | 55.0 | 2nd |

=== Week 2 ===
Week 2 – Group stage

- Style: Country

| Artistic judges | | Technical judges | | |
| 1 | 2 | 3 | 4 | 5 |
|---|---|---|---|---|
| Milton Cunha | Ana Clara Lima | Carlinhos de Jesus | Ana Botafogo | Zebrinha |

Running order

| Group | Judges' score | | | | | Total score | Studio score | Week total | Final total | Result |
| Group | 1 | 2 | 3 | 4 | 5 | Total score | Studio score | Week total | Final total | Result |
|---|---|---|---|---|---|---|---|---|---|---|
| Álvaro & Mariana; Lucas & Mayara; Tereza & Bilisco; Wanessa & Diego | 9.9 | 10 | 8.4 | 8.6 | 8.7 | 45.6 | 9.0 | 54.6 | 109.6 | 2nd |
| Allan & Gabe; Catia & Luca; Manu & Heron; Richarlyson & Monique | 9.4 | 10 | 8.4 | 8.6 | 8.6 | 45.0 | 9.4 | 54.4 | 108.4 | 3rd |
| David & Jaque; Fernanda & Dudu; Luan & Mariana; Nicole & Fernando | 9.6 | 10 | 8.4 | 8.7 | 8.5 | 45.2 | 9.6 | 54.8 | 108.4 | 3rd |
| Duda & Daniel; Gracyanne & Lynekee; Rodrigo & Larissa; Silvero & Thais | 9.8 | 10 | 8.5 | 8.8 | 8.8 | 45.9 | 9.8 | 55.7 | 111.3 | 1st |

=== Week 3 ===
Week 3 – Group stage

- Style: Street

| Artistic judges | | Technical judges | | |
| 1 | 2 | 3 | 4 | 5 |
|---|---|---|---|---|
| Milton Cunha | Cauã Reymond | Carlinhos de Jesus | Ana Botafogo | Zebrinha |

Running order

| Group | Judges' score | | | | | Total score | Studio score | Week total | Final total | Result |
| Group | 1 | 2 | 3 | 4 | 5 | Total score | Studio score | Week total | Final total | Result |
|---|---|---|---|---|---|---|---|---|---|---|
| Duda & Daniel; Gracyanne & Lynekee; Rodrigo & Larissa; Silvero & Thais | 9.9 | 10 | 8.8 | 9.0 | 9.3 | 47.0 | 9.6 | 56.6 | 167.9 | 1st |
| Álvaro & Mariana; Lucas & Mayara; Tereza & Bilisco; Wanessa & Diego | 9.7 | 10 | 8.7 | 8.9 | 9.1 | 46.4 | 9.7 | 56.1 | 165.7 | 2nd |
| Allan & Gabe; Catia & Luca; Manu & Heron; Richarlyson & Monique | 9.9 | 10 | 8.7 | 8.7 | 9.1 | 46.4 | 9.6 | 56.0 | 164.4 | Dance-off |
| David & Jaque; Fernanda & Dudu; Luan & Mariana; Nicole & Fernando | 9.6 | 10 | 8.8 | 8.9 | 8.9 | 46.2 | 9.8 | 56.0 | 164.4 | Dance-off |

=== Week 4 ===
Group stage dance-off

- Style: Rock

| Artistic judge | Technical judges | | |
| 1 | 2 | 3 | 4 |
|---|---|---|---|
| Milton Cunha | Carlinhos de Jesus | Ana Botafogo | Zebrinha |

Running order

| Couple | Judges' score | | | | Total score | Studio score | Week total | Final total | Result |
| Couple | 1 | 2 | 3 | 4 | Total score | Studio score | Week total | Final total | Result |
|---|---|---|---|---|---|---|---|---|---|
| Manu & Heron | 9.9 | 9.9 | 9.8 | 9.6 | 39.2 | 9.5 | —N/a | 48.7 | Advanced (4th) |
| Allan & Gabe | 10 | 10 | 10 | 9.9 | 39.9 | 9.7 | —N/a | 49.6 | Advanced (1st) |
| Fernanda & Dudu | 9.6 | 9.9 | 9.4 | 9.5 | 38.4 | 9.4 | —N/a | 47.8 | Eliminated |
| Richarlyson & Monique | 9.8 | 9.7 | 9.7 | 9.7 | 38.9 | 9.3 | —N/a | 48.2 | Advanced (5th) |
| Catia & Luca | 9.4 | 9.5 | 9.3 | 9.4 | 37.6 | 9.1 | —N/a | 46.7 | Eliminated |
| Luan & Mariana | 9.7 | 9.7 | 9.5 | 9.5 | 38.4 | 9.6 | —N/a | 48.0 | Advanced (6th) |
| Nicole & Fernando | 9.8 | 9.8 | 9.7 | 9.7 | 39.0 | 9.9 | —N/a | 48.9 | Advanced (3rd) |
| David & Jaque | 9.8 | 10 | 9.8 | 9.8 | 39.4 | 9.6 | —N/a | 49.0 | Advanced (2nd) |

=== Week 5 ===
Week 1 – Group 1

- Style: Forró

| Artistic judges | | Technical judges | | |
| 1 | 2 | 3 | 4 | 5 |
|---|---|---|---|---|
| Milton Cunha | Malu Galli | Carlinhos de Jesus | Ana Botafogo | Zebrinha |

Running order

| Couple | Judges' score | | | | | Total score | Studio score | Week total | Final total | Result |
| Couple | 1 | 2 | 3 | 4 | 5 | Total score | Studio score | Week total | Final total | Result |
|---|---|---|---|---|---|---|---|---|---|---|
| Luan & Mariana | 9.7 | 10 | 8.3 | 8.4 | 8.3 | 44.7 | 9.2 | —N/a | 53.9 | 7th |
| Álvaro & Mariana | 9.6 | 10 | 8.3 | 8.4 | 8.4 | 44.7 | 9.5 | —N/a | 54.2 | 6th |
| Nicole & Fernando | 9.8 | 10 | 8.6 | 8.6 | 8.5 | 45.5 | 9.8 | —N/a | 55.3 | 3rd |
| Manu & Heron | 10 | 10 | 8.6 | 8.6 | 8.6 | 45.8 | 9.8 | —N/a | 55.6 | 1st |
| Lucas & Mayara | 9.9 | 10 | 8.5 | 8.5 | 8.6 | 45.5 | 9.7 | —N/a | 55.2 | 4th |
| Allan & Gabe | 10 | 10 | 8.6 | 8.7 | 8.7 | 46.0 | 9.6 | —N/a | 55.6 | 1st |
| Wanessa & Diego | 9.8 | 10 | 8.6 | 8.5 | 8.5 | 45.4 | 9.4 | —N/a | 54.8 | 5th |

=== Week 6 ===
Week 1 – Group 2

- Style: Piseiro

| Artistic judges | | Technical judges | | |
| 1 | 2 | 3 | 4 | 5 |
|---|---|---|---|---|
| Milton Cunha | Giovanna Antonelli | Carlinhos de Jesus | Ana Botafogo | Zebrinha |

Running order

| Couple | Judges' score | | | | | Total score | Studio score | Week total | Final total | Result |
| Couple | 1 | 2 | 3 | 4 | 5 | Total score | Studio score | Week total | Final total | Result |
|---|---|---|---|---|---|---|---|---|---|---|
| David & Jaque | 9.9 | 10 | 8.7 | 8.7 | 8.6 | 45.9 | 9.5 | —N/a | 55.4 | 3rd |
| Tereza & Bilisco | 9.7 | 10 | 8.5 | 8.5 | 8.5 | 45.2 | 9.4 | —N/a | 54.6 | 7th |
| Richarlyson & Monique | 9.6 | 10 | 8.6 | 8.6 | 8.6 | 45.4 | 9.6 | —N/a | 55.0 | 5th |
| Duda & Daniel | 9.9 | 10 | 8.7 | 8.6 | 8.6 | 45.8 | 9.7 | —N/a | 55.5 | 2nd |
| Rodrigo & Larissa | 9.8 | 10 | 8.5 | 8.5 | 8.5 | 45.3 | 9.8 | —N/a | 55.1 | 4th |
| Gracyanne & Lynekee | 9.7 | 10 | 8.6 | 8.6 | 8.5 | 45.4 | 9.6 | —N/a | 55.0 | 5th |
| Silvero & Thais | 10 | 10 | 8.8 | 8.8 | 8.8 | 46.4 | 10 | —N/a | 56.4 | 1st |

=== Week 7 ===
Week 2 – Group 1

- Style: Zouk

| Artistic judges | | Technical judges | | |
| 1 | 2 | 3 | 4 | 5 |
|---|---|---|---|---|
| Milton Cunha | Ludmilla & Brunna Gonçalves | Carlinhos de Jesus | Ana Botafogo | Zebrinha |

Running order

| Couple | Judges' score | | | | | Total score | Studio score | Week total | Final total | Result |
| Couple | 1 | 2 | 3 | 4 | 5 | Total score | Studio score | Week total | Final total | Result |
|---|---|---|---|---|---|---|---|---|---|---|
| Allan & Aline | 9.9 | 10 | 8.6 | 8.7 | 8.6 | 45.8 | 9.5 | 55.3 | 110.9 | 3rd |
| Manu & Heron | 10 | 10 | 8.7 | 8.7 | 8.7 | 46.1 | 9.6 | 55.7 | 111.3 | 1st |
| Luan & Mariana | 9.7 | 10 | 8.5 | 8.5 | 8.4 | 45.1 | 9.3 | 54.4 | 108.3 | 7th |
| Wanessa & Diego | 10 | 10 | 8.6 | 8.5 | 8.5 | 45.6 | 9.8 | 55.4 | 110.2 | 5th |
| Lucas & Mayara | 9.8 | 10 | 8.6 | 8.6 | 8.6 | 45.6 | 9.8 | 55.4 | 110.6 | 4th |
| Álvaro & Mariana | 10 | 10 | 8.5 | 8.5 | 8.5 | 45.5 | 9.4 | 54.9 | 109.1 | 6th |
| Nicole & Fernando | 10 | 10 | 8.6 | 8.7 | 8.7 | 46.0 | 9.8 | 55.8 | 111.1 | 2nd |

=== Week 8 ===
Week 2 – Group 2

- Style: Lambada

| Artistic judges | | Technical judges | | |
| 1 | 2 | 3 | 4 | 5 |
|---|---|---|---|---|
| Milton Cunha | Belize Pombal | Carlinhos de Jesus | Ana Botafogo | Zebrinha |

Running order

| Couple | Judges' score | | | | | Total score | Studio score | Week total | Final total | Result |
| Couple | 1 | 2 | 3 | 4 | 5 | Total score | Studio score | Week total | Final total | Result |
|---|---|---|---|---|---|---|---|---|---|---|
| Silvero & Thais | 9.9 | 10 | 10 | 8.9 | 8.9 | 47.7 | 9.7 | 57.4 | 113.8 | 1st |
| Duda & Daniel | 9.9 | 10 | 8.9 | 8.9 | 8.8 | 46.5 | 9.5 | 56.0 | 111.5 | 3rd |
| Tereza & Bilisco | 9.7 | 10 | 8.7 | 8.8 | 8.7 | 45.9 | 9.5 | 55.4 | 110.0 | 7th |
| Richarlyson & Monique | 10 | 10 | 8.7 | 8.9 | 8.8 | 46.4 | 9.6 | 56.0 | 111.0 | 4th |
| Rodrigo & Larissa | 9.7 | 10 | 8.7 | 8.7 | 8.6 | 45.7 | 9.7 | 55.4 | 110.5 | 5th |
| Gracyanne & Lynekee | 9.6 | 10 | 8.8 | 8.7 | 8.6 | 45.7 | 9.7 | 55.4 | 110.4 | 6th |
| David & Jaque | 10 | 10 | 9.0 | 8.9 | 8.9 | 46.8 | 10 | 56.8 | 112.2 | 2nd |

=== Week 9 ===
Week 3 – Group 1

- Style: Funk

| Artistic judges | | Technical judges | | |
| 1 | 2 | 3 | 4 | 5 |
|---|---|---|---|---|
| Milton Cunha | Eduardo Sterblitch | Carlinhos de Jesus | Ana Botafogo | Zebrinha |

Running order

| Couple | Judges' score | | | | | Total score | Studio score | Week total | Final total | Result (week 5–9) |
| Couple | 1 | 2 | 3 | 4 | 5 | Total score | Studio score | Week total | Final total | Result (week 5–9) |
|---|---|---|---|---|---|---|---|---|---|---|
| Manu & Heron | 9.9 | 10 | 9.6 | 9.8 | 9.7 | 49.0 | 9.7 | 58.7 | 170.0 | 2nd |
| Luan & Mariana | 9.8 | 10 | 9.5 | 9.6 | 9.5 | 48.4 | 9.3 | 57.7 | 166.0 | Dance-off (7th) |
| Nicole & Fernando | 9.8 | 10 | 9.6 | 9.6 | 9.6 | 48.6 | 9.8 | 58.4 | 169.5 | Dance-off (4th) |
| Lucas & Mayara | 10 | 10 | 10 | 10 | 10 | 50.0 | 10 | 60.0 | 170.6 | 1st |
| Allan & Gabe | 10 | 10 | 9.8 | 9.8 | 9.8 | 49.4 | 9.4 | 58.8 | 169.7 | 3rd |
| Wanessa & Diego | 9.8 | 10 | 9.8 | 9.7 | 9.7 | 49.0 | 9.7 | 58.7 | 168.9 | Dance-off (5th) |
| Álvaro & Mariana | 10 | 10 | 9.9 | 9.8 | 9.8 | 49.5 | 10 | 59.5 | 168.6 | Dance-off (6th) |

=== Week 10 ===
Week 3 – Group 2

- Style: Funk

| Artistic judges | | Technical judges | | |
| 1 | 2 | 3 | 4 | 5 |
|---|---|---|---|---|
| Milton Cunha | Débora Bloch | Carlinhos de Jesus | Ana Botafogo | Zebrinha |

Running order

| Couple | Judges' score | | | | | Total score | Studio score | Week total | Final total | Result (week 6–10) |
| Couple | 1 | 2 | 3 | 4 | 5 | Total score | Studio score | Week total | Final total | Result (week 6–10) |
|---|---|---|---|---|---|---|---|---|---|---|
| Tereza & Bilisco | 9.6 | 10 | 9.5 | 9.7 | 9.6 | 48.4 | 9.3 | 57.7 | 167.7 | Dance-off (6th) |
| David & Jaque | 9.9 | 10 | 10 | 10 | 9.9 | 49.8 | 9.7 | 59.5 | 171.7 | 2nd |
| Silvero & Thais | 10 | 10 | 10 | 10 | 10 | 50.0 | 9.6 | 59.6 | 173.4 | 1st |
| Rodrigo & Larissa | 9.9 | 10 | 9.7 | 9.7 | 9.7 | 49.0 | 9.9 | 58.9 | 169.4 | Dance-off (5th) |
| Richarlyson & Monique | 10 | 10 | 9.9 | 9.9 | 9.9 | 49.7 | 9.9 | 59.6 | 170.6 | Dance-off (4th) |
| Duda & Daniel | 10 | 10 | 10 | 10 | 10 | 50.0 | 10 | 60.0 | 171.5 | 3rd |

=== Week 11 ===
Couple stage dance-off

- Style: Lindy Hop

| Artistic judge | Technical judges | |
| 1 | 2 | 3 |
|---|---|---|
| Milton Cunha | Carlinhos de Jesus | Zebrinha |

Running order

| Couple | Judges' vote | | | Public's vote | Total votes | Result |
| Couple | 1 | 2 | 3 | Public's vote | Total votes | Result |
|---|---|---|---|---|---|---|
| Richarlyson & Monique | | | ✔ | | 1 | Advanced |
| Tereza & Bilisco | | | | | 0 | Eliminated |
| Nicole & Fernando | ✔ | | | | 1 | Advanced |
| Álvaro & Mariana | | | | ✔ (42%) | 1 | Advanced |
| Wanessa & Diego | | ✔ | | | 1 | Advanced |
| Rodrigo & Larissa | | | | | 0 | Eliminated |

=== Week 12 ===
Week 1 – Playoffs

- Style: Sertanejo

| Artistic judges | | Technical judges | | |
| 1 | 2 | 3 | 4 | 5 |
|---|---|---|---|---|
| Milton Cunha | Sabrina Sato | Carlinhos de Jesus | Ana Botafogo | Zebrinha |

Running order

| Couple | Judges' score | | | | | Total score | Studio score | Week total | Final total | Result |
| Couple | 1 | 2 | 3 | 4 | 5 | Total score | Studio score | Week total | Final total | Result |
|---|---|---|---|---|---|---|---|---|---|---|
| Lucas & Mayara | 9.9 | 10 | 8.9 | 9.1 | 9.1 | 47.0 | 9.6 | —N/a | 56.6 | Eliminated |
| Nicole & Fernando | 10 | 10 | 9.1 | 9.0 | 8.9 | 47.0 | 9.8 | —N/a | 56.8 | 4th |
| Richarlyson & Monique | 10 | 10 | 9.4 | 9.3 | 9.2 | 47.9 | 9.7 | —N/a | 57.6 | 3rd |
| Manu & Heron | 10 | 10 | 9.5 | 9.4 | 9.4 | 48.3 | 9.8 | —N/a | 58.1 | 2nd |
| David & Jaque | 10 | 10 | 9.5 | 9.5 | 9.5 | 48.5 | 9.8 | —N/a | 58.3 | 1st |

=== Week 13 ===
Week 2 – Playoffs

- Style: Sertanejo

| Artistic judges | | Technical judges | | |
| 1 | 2 | 3 | 4 | 5 |
|---|---|---|---|---|
| Milton Cunha | Angélica | Carlinhos de Jesus | Ana Botafogo | Zebrinha |

Running order

| Couple | Judges' score | | | | | Total score | Studio score | Week total | Final total | Result |
| Couple | 1 | 2 | 3 | 4 | 5 | Total score | Studio score | Week total | Final total | Result |
|---|---|---|---|---|---|---|---|---|---|---|
| Duda & Daniel | 9.9 | 10 | 9.4 | 9.4 | 9.4 | 48.1 | 9.5 | —N/a | 57.6 | Eliminated |
| Álvaro & Mariana | 9.9 | 10 | 9.4 | 9.4 | 9.5 | 48.2 | 9.7 | —N/a | 57.9 | 3rd |
| Wanessa & Diego | 10 | 10 | 9.4 | 9.4 | 9.5 | 48.3 | 9.5 | —N/a | 57.8 | 4th |
| Silvero & Thais | 10 | 10 | 9.5 | 9.6 | 9.6 | 48.7 | 9.7 | —N/a | 58.4 | 2nd |
| Allan & Gabe | 10 | 10 | 9.4 | 9.6 | 9.7 | 48.7 | 9.8 | —N/a | 58.5 | 1st |

=== Week 14 ===
Top 8

- Style: Salsa

| Artistic judges | | Technical judges | | |
| 1 | 2 | 3 | 4 | 5 |
|---|---|---|---|---|
| Milton Cunha | Ana Maria Braga | Carlinhos de Jesus | Ana Botafogo | Zebrinha |

Running order

| Couple | Judges' score | | | | | Total score | Studio score | Week total | Final total | Result |
| Couple | 1 | 2 | 3 | 4 | 5 | Total score | Studio score | Week total | Final total | Result |
|---|---|---|---|---|---|---|---|---|---|---|
| Wanessa & Diego | 10 | 10 | 9.5 | 9.6 | 9.6 | 48.7 | 9.6 | —N/a | 58.3 | 5th |
| Allan & Gabe | 9.9 | 10 | 9.6 | 9.5 | 9.5 | 48.5 | 9.3 | —N/a | 57.8 | Eliminated |
| David & Jaque | 9.9 | 10 | 9.6 | 9.6 | 9.6 | 48.7 | 9.7 | —N/a | 58.4 | 3rd |
| Manu & Heron | 9.9 | 10 | 9.4 | 9.6 | 9.5 | 48.4 | 9.7 | —N/a | 58.1 | 6th |
| Álvaro & Mariana | 10 | 10 | 9.5 | 9.5 | 9.5 | 48.5 | 9.9 | —N/a | 58.4 | 3rd |
| Nicole & Fernando | 9.9 | 10 | 9.4 | 9.4 | 9.4 | 48.1 | 9.7 | —N/a | 57.8 | Eliminated |
| Silvero & Thais | 9.9 | 10 | 9.7 | 9.7 | 9.7 | 49.0 | 9.7 | —N/a | 58.7 | 1st |
| Richarlyson & Monique | 9.9 | 10 | 9.7 | 9.7 | 9.6 | 48.9 | 9.7 | —N/a | 58.6 | 2nd |

=== Week 15 ===
Top 6

- Style: Gypsy

| Artistic judges | | Technical judges | | |
| 1 | 2 | 3 | 4 | 5 |
|---|---|---|---|---|
| Milton Cunha | Ivete Sangalo | Carlinhos de Jesus | Ana Botafogo | Zebrinha |

Running order

| Couple | Judges' score | | | | | Total score | Studio score | Gshow score | Week total | Final total | Result |
| Couple | 1 | 2 | 3 | 4 | 5 | Total score | Studio score | Gshow score | Week total | Final total | Result |
|---|---|---|---|---|---|---|---|---|---|---|---|
| Silvero & Thais | 10 | 10 | 9.7 | 9.7 | 9.8 | 49.2 | 9.6 | 9.9 | 68.7 | 127.4 | 1st |
| Richarlyson & Monique | 9.9 | 10 | 9.6 | 9.6 | 9.6 | 48.7 | 9.3 | 9.5 | 67.5 | 126.1 | Eliminated |
| Álvaro & Mariana | 9.9 | 10 | 9.6 | 9.6 | 9.5 | 48.6 | 9.5 | 9.9 | 68.0 | 126.4 | 5th |
| Manu & Heron | 10 | 10 | 9.8 | 9.8 | 9.6 | 49.2 | 9.8 | 9.9 | 68.9 | 127.0 | 3rd |
| David & Jaque | 10 | 10 | 9.7 | 9.6 | 9.8 | 49.1 | 9.4 | 9.8 | 68.3 | 126.7 | 4th |
| Wanessa & Diego | 10 | 10 | 9.8 | 9.8 | 9.7 | 49.3 | 9.7 | 9.9 | 68.9 | 127.2 | 2nd |

=== Week 16 ===
Top 5

- Style: Tango

| Artistic judges | | Technical judges | | |
| 1 | 2 | 3 | 4 | 5 |
|---|---|---|---|---|
| Milton Cunha | Serginho Groisman | Carlinhos de Jesus | Ana Botafogo | Zebrinha |

Running order

| Couple | Judges' score | | | | | Total score | Studio score | Gshow score | Week total | Final total | Result |
| Couple | 1 | 2 | 3 | 4 | 5 | Total score | Studio score | Gshow score | Week total | Final total | Result |
|---|---|---|---|---|---|---|---|---|---|---|---|
| Álvaro & Mariana | 10 | 10 | 9.5 | 9.5 | 9.6 | 48.6 | 9.7 | 9.9 | 68.2 | 194.6 | Eliminated |
| Wanessa & Diego | 10 | 10 | 9.8 | 9.8 | 9.8 | 49.4 | 9.8 | 9.7 | 68.9 | 196.1 | 2nd |
| David & Jaque | 10 | 10 | 9.8 | 10 | 9.9 | 49.7 | 9.8 | 9.8 | 69.3 | 196.0 | 3rd |
| Manu & Heron | 10 | 10 | 9.8 | 9.8 | 9.7 | 49.3 | 9.7 | 9.8 | 68.8 | 195.8 | 4th |
| Silvero & Thais | 10 | 10 | 9.7 | 9.8 | 9.9 | 49.4 | 9.7 | 9.9 | 69.0 | 196.4 | 1st |

=== Week 17 ===
Top 4 – Semifinals

- Style: Contemporary

| Artistic judges | | Technical judges | | |
| 1 | 2 | 3 | 4 | 5 |
|---|---|---|---|---|
| Milton Cunha | Fernanda Lima | Carlinhos de Jesus | Ana Botafogo | Zebrinha |

Running order

| Couple | Judges' score | | | | | Total score | Studio score | Gshow score | Week total | Final total | Result |
| Couple | 1 | 2 | 3 | 4 | 5 | Total score | Studio score | Gshow score | Week total | Final total | Result |
|---|---|---|---|---|---|---|---|---|---|---|---|
| Silvero & Thais | 10 | 10 | 10 | 10 | 9.9 | 49.9 | 9.9 | 10 | 69.8 | 266.2 | Finalist (1st) |
| Wanessa & Diego | 9.9 | 10 | 10 | 10 | 10 | 49.9 | 9.7 | 9.8 | 69.4 | 265.5 | Finalist (2nd) |
| David & Jaque | 9.9 | 10 | 10 | 10 | 10 | 49.9 | 9.6 | 9.8 | 69.3 | 265.3 | Eliminated |
| Manu & Heron | 10 | 10 | 10 | 10 | 9.9 | 49.9 | 9.8 | 9.9 | 69.6 | 265.4 | Finalist (3rd) |

=== Week 18 ===
Top 3 – Finals

- Styles: Waltz & Samba

| Artistic judges | | | Technical judges | | |
| 1 | 2 | 3 | 4 | 5 | 6 |
|---|---|---|---|---|---|
| Milton Cunha | Ingrid Silva | Tati Machado | Carlinhos de Jesus | Ana Botafogo | Zebrinha |

Running order

Waltz
| Couple | Judges' score | | | | | | Total score | Studio score | Gshow score | Dance total | Final total | Result |
| Couple | 1 | 2 | 3 | 4 | 5 | 6 | Total score | Studio score | Gshow score | Dance total | Final total | Result |
|---|---|---|---|---|---|---|---|---|---|---|---|---|
| Manu & Heron | 10 | 10 | 10 | 9.9 | 9.9 | 9.8 | 59.6 | 9.4 | 9.8 | 78.8 | — | N/A |
| Silvero & Thais | 10 | 10 | 10 | 10 | 10 | 10 | 60.0 | 9.8 | 10 | 79.8 | — | N/A |
| Wanessa & Diego | 10 | 10 | 10 | 9.9 | 9.9 | 9.9 | 59.7 | 9.6 | 9.8 | 79.1 | — | N/A |

Samba
| Couple | Judges' score | | | | | | Total score | Studio score | Gshow score | Dance total | Final total | Result |
| Couple | 1 | 2 | 3 | 4 | 5 | 6 | Total score | Studio score | Gshow score | Dance total | Final total | Result |
|---|---|---|---|---|---|---|---|---|---|---|---|---|
| Manu & Heron | 9.9 | 10 | 10 | 9.8 | 10 | 9.9 | 59.6 | 9.4 | 9.6 | 78.6 | 157.4 | Third place |
| Silvero & Thais | 10 | 10 | 10 | 10 | 10 | 10 | 60.0 | 10 | 10 | 80.0 | 159.8 | Winner |
| Wanessa & Diego | 9.9 | 10 | 10 | 9.9 | 9.9 | 9.9 | 59.6 | 9.4 | 9.7 | 78.7 | 157.8 | Runner-up |
