= Dança dos Famosos season 21 =

Dança dos Famosos
- Season 21
- Hosted by: Luciano Huck
- Judges: Ana Botafogo; Carlinhos de Jesus; Zebrinha
- Celebrity winner: Tati Machado
- Professional winner: Diego Maia
- No. of episodes: 18

Release
- Original network: TV Globo
- Original release: March 10 – July 7, 2024

Season chronology
- ← Previous; Season 20 Next → Season 22

Dança dos Famosos 2024 is the twentieth-first season of the Brazilian reality television show Dança dos Famosos which premiered on March 10, 2024, at 7:00 / 6:00 p.m. (BRT / AMT) on TV Globo, following a cast reveal special that aired on March 3.

On July 7, 2024, TV host Tati Machado & Diego Maia won the competition over actor Amaury Lorenzo & Camila Lobo and singer Lucy Alves & Fernando Perrotti, who took 2nd and 3rd place respectively.

== Couples ==
The first two celebrities (Henri Castelli and Talitha Morete) were confirmed on February 29, 2024. On August 30, 2020, Henri was announced as a contestant on season 17 but withdrew from competing on September 13 due to undisclosed reasons. The full lineup of celebrities was unveiled later on the same day, following taping of the cast reveal special episode. During 2017, Lexa and Micael Borges participated on Dancing Brasil, RecordTV's incarnation of the Dancing with the Stars format, thus making them the first celebrity constestants who had competed in both versions of the show. Micael was eliminated in the quarterfinals of season 1, finishing in fourth place, while Lexa was a finalist in season 2, finishing in third place.

Celebrity	Notability (known for)	Professional	Group	Status	Ref.
Matheus Fernandes	Singer	Aline Ramos	D	Eliminated 1st on April 7, 2024	
Gabriela Prioli	Political commentator	Jefferson Bilisco	D	Eliminated 2nd on April 7, 2024	
Henri Castelli	Actor	Tati Scarletti	B	Eliminated 3rd on May 12, 2024	
Klara Castanho	Actress	Daniel Norton	C	Eliminated 4th on May 12, 2024	
Talitha Morete	TV host	Dennis Dinelli	C	Eliminated 5th on May 12, 2024	
Barbara Reis Returned on May 26	Actress	Vinícius Mello	B	Eliminated 6th on May 12, 2024	
Bárbara Coelho	Journalist & TV host	Vitor Avelar	B	Eliminated 7th on May 19, 2024	
Micael Borges Returned on May 26	Actor	Nathália Ramos	D	Eliminated 8th on May 19, 2024	
Lexa Returned on May 26	Singer	Diego Basilio	D	Eliminated 9th on May 19, 2024	
Juliano Floss Returned on May 26	Digital influencer	Dani Duram	B	Eliminated 10th on May 19, 2024	
Enrique Díaz	Actor	Gabe Cardoso	C	Eliminated 11th on June 2, 2024	
Lexa	Singer	Diego Basilio	D	Eliminated 12th on June 2, 2024	
Micael Borges	Actor	Nathália Ramos	D	Eliminated 13th on June 9, 2024	
MC Daniel	Singer	Paula Santos	A	Eliminated 14th on June 9, 2024	
Juliano Floss	Digital influencer	Dani Duram	B	Eliminated 15th on June 16, 2024	
Samuel de Assis	Actor	Lari Parison	A	Eliminated 16th on June 23, 2024	
Barbara Reis	Actress	Vinícius Mello	B	Eliminated 17th on June 30, 2024	
Lucy Alves	Singer & actress	Fernando Perrotti	A	Third place on July 7, 2024	
Amaury Lorenzo	Actor	Camila Lobo	C	Runner-up on July 7, 2024	
Tati Machado	Journalist & TV host	Diego Maia	A	Winner on July 7, 2024	

== Elimination chart ==
Couple	Place	Group stage					Couple stage													
Couple	Place	1	2	3	4	T	5	6	7	8	9	10	11	12	13	14	15	16	17	18
Tati & Diego	1	48.0	47.1	48.5	50.0	193.6	—N/a	45.9	—N/a	46.5	—N/a	48.0	—N/a	—N/a	—N/a	49.1	49.2	49.0	49.8	99.7
Amaury & Camila	2	45.5	47.1	48.5	49.7	190.8	—N/a	45.8	—N/a	46.5	—N/a	46.8	—N/a	—N/a	—N/a	49.2	49.0	49.2	50.0	99.9
Lucy & Fernando	3	48.0	47.1	48.5	50.0	193.6	—N/a	—N/a	46.5	—N/a	46.7	—N/a	48.3	—N/a	49.0	—N/a	48.9	49.7	50.0	99.8
Barbara & Vinícius	4	45.2	46.6	48.5	49.6	189.9	—N/a	45.9	—N/a	46.1	—N/a	46.7		6/24	—N/a	48.9	48.7	49.4	49.3	
Samuel & Lari	5	48.0	47.1	48.5	50.0	193.6	—N/a	—N/a	46.1	—N/a	46.6	—N/a	46.7	—N/a	49.0	—N/a	48.9	49.1		
Juliano & Dani	6	45.2	46.6	48.5	49.6	189.9	—N/a	—N/a	45.8	—N/a	46.4	—N/a	46.8	4/24	48.4	—N/a	48.4			
MC Daniel & Paula	7	48.0	47.1	48.5	50.0	193.6	—N/a	45.4	—N/a	46.5	—N/a	46.8	—N/a	—N/a	—N/a	48.4				
Micael & Nathália	8	45.2	46.5	48.5	49.4	189.6	49.6	—N/a	45.6	—N/a	46.2	—N/a	46.6	4/24	—N/a	48.5				
Lexa & Diego	9	45.2	46.5	48.5	49.4	189.6	49.3	—N/a	45.6	—N/a	46.4	—N/a	47.0	5/24	48.2					
Enrique & Gabe	10	45.5	47.1	48.5	49.7	190.8	—N/a	—N/a	46.2	—N/a	46.6	—N/a	46.9	—N/a	48.1					
Klara & Daniel	11	45.5	47.1	48.5	49.7	190.8	—N/a	45.2	—N/a	46.0	—N/a	46.2		3/24						
Talitha & Dennis	12	45.5	47.1	48.5	49.7	190.8	—N/a	45.4	—N/a	46.0	—N/a	46.1		2/24						
Bárbara & Vitor	13	45.2	46.6	48.5	49.6	189.9	—N/a	—N/a	45.2	—N/a	45.7	—N/a	46.1	0/24						
Henri & Tati	14	45.2	46.6	48.5	49.6	189.9	—N/a	44.9	—N/a	45.7	—N/a	45.8		0/24						
Gabriela & Bilisco	15	45.2	46.5	48.5	49.4	189.6	49.3													
Matheus & Aline	16	45.2	46.5	48.5	49.4	189.6	49.0													

Lowest score
Highest score
Dance-off
Saved last
Eliminated

Winner
Runner-up
Third place

== Weekly results ==
=== Week 1 ===
Week 1 – Group stage

- Style: Charme

Artistic judges		Technical judges		
1	2	3	4	5
Antônio Calloni	Giovanna Antonelli	Carlinhos de Jesus	Ana Botafogo	Zebrinha

Running order

Group	Judges' score					Total score	Studio score	Week total	Final total	Result
Group	1	2	3	4	5	Total score	Studio score	Week total	Final total	Result
Gabriela & Bilisco; Lexa & Diego; Matheus & Aline; Micael & Nathália	10	10	8.3	8.5	8.4	45.2	9.4	—	54.6	3rd
Bárbara & Vitor; Barbara & Vinícius; Henri & Tati; Juliano & Dani	10	10	8.2	8.5	8.5	45.2	9.0	—	54.2	4th
Amaury & Camila; Enrique & Dani; Klara & Daniel; Talitha & Dennis	10	10	8.5	8.4	8.6	45.5	9.8	—	55.3	2nd
MC Daniel & Paula; Lucy & Fernando; Samuel & Lari; Tati & Diego	10	10	10	9.0	9.0	48.0	10	—	58.0	1st

=== Week 2 ===
Week 2 – Group stage

- Style: Reggaeton

Artistic judges		Technical judges		
1	2	3	4	5
Marcello Melo Jr.	Rodrigo Simas	Carlinhos de Jesus	Ana Botafogo	Zebrinha

Running order

Group	Judges' score					Total score	Studio score	Week total	Final total	Result
Group	1	2	3	4	5	Total score	Studio score	Week total	Final total	Result
Bárbara & Vitor; Barbara & Vinícius; Henri & Tati; Juliano & Dani	10	10	9.0	8.9	8.7	46.6	9.2	55.8	110.0	3rd
MC Daniel & Paula; Lucy & Fernando; Samuel & Lari; Tati & Diego	10	10	8.8	9.2	9.1	47.1	9.8	56.9	114.9	1st
Gabriela & Bilisco; Lexa & Diego; Matheus & Aline; Micael & Nathália	10	10	8.9	8.8	8.8	46.5	8.9	55.4	110.0	3rd
Amaury & Camila; Enrique & Dani; Klara & Daniel; Talitha & Dennis	10	10	9.0	9.0	9.1	47.1	9.6	56.7	112.0	2nd

=== Week 3 ===
Week 3 – Group stage

- Style: Folklore – Rio Carnival (A), June Festivals (B), Parintins Festival (C) and Gaúcho Music Festivals (D)

Artistic judges		Technical judges		
1	2	3	4	5
Cauã Reymond	Simone Mendes	Carlinhos de Jesus	Ana Botafogo	Zebrinha

Running order

Group	Judges' score					Total score	Studio score	Week total	Final total	Result
Group	1	2	3	4	5	Total score	Studio score	Week total	Final total	Result
MC Daniel & Paula; Lucy & Fernando; Samuel & Lari; Tati & Diego	10	10	9.5	9.5	9.5	48.5	9.7	58.2	173.1	1st
Amaury & Camila; Enrique & Dani; Klara & Daniel; Talitha & Dennis	10	10	9.5	9.5	9.5	48.5	9.4	57.9	169.9	2nd
Gabriela & Bilisco; Lexa & Diego; Matheus & Aline; Micael & Nathália	10	10	9.5	9.5	9.5	48.5	9.5	58.0	168.0	4th
Bárbara & Vitor; Barbara & Vinícius; Henri & Tati; Juliano & Dani	10	10	9.5	9.5	9.5	48.5	9.6	58.1	168.1	3rd

=== Week 4 ===
Week 4 – Group stage

- Style: Rock

Artistic judges		Technical judges		
1	2	3	4	5
Paulo Miklos	Letícia Colin	Carlinhos de Jesus	Ana Botafogo	Zebrinha

Running order

Group	Judges' score					Total score	Studio score	Week total	Final total	Result (week 1–4)
Group	1	2	3	4	5	Total score	Studio score	Week total	Final total	Result (week 1–4)
Amaury & Camila; Enrique & Dani; Klara & Daniel; Talitha & Dennis	10	10	10	9.9	9.8	49.7	9.6	59.3	229.2	2nd
Gabriela & Bilisco; Lexa & Diego; Matheus & Aline; Micael & Nathália	10	9.8	9.9	9.8	9.9	49.4	9.4	58.8	226.8	Dance-off
Bárbara & Vitor; Barbara & Vinícius; Henri & Tati; Juliano & Dani	10	10	9.8	9.9	9.9	49.6	9.4	59.0	227.1	3rd
MC Daniel & Paula; Lucy & Fernando; Samuel & Lari; Tati & Diego	10	10	10	10	10	50.0	9.8	59.8	232.9	1st

=== Week 5 ===
Group stage dance-off

- Style: Piseiro

Artistic judges		Technical judges		
1	2	3	4	5
Camila Morgado	Giullia Buscacio	Carlinhos de Jesus	Ana Botafogo	Zebrinha

Running order

Couple	Judges' score					Total score	Studio score	Week total	Final total	Result
Couple	1	2	3	4	5	Total score	Studio score	Week total	Final total	Result
Micael & Nathália	10	10	9.8	9.9	9.9	49.6	9.7	—N/a	59.3	Advanced (1st)
Gabriela & Bilisco	10	10	9.7	9.8	9.8	49.3	9.4	—N/a	58.7	Eliminated
Matheus & Aline	10	10	9.6	9.7	9.7	49.0	9.5	—N/a	58.5	Eliminated
Lexa & Diego	10	10	9.9	9.8	9.7	49.4	9.6	—N/a	59.0	Advanced (2nd)

=== Week 6 ===
Week 1 – Group 1

- Style: Bachata

Artistic judges		Technical judges		
1	2	3	4	5
Eduardo Sterblitch	Júlia Lemmertz	Carlinhos de Jesus	Ana Botafogo	Zebrinha

Running order

Couple	Judges' score					Total score	Studio score	Week total	Final total	Result
Couple	1	2	3	4	5	Total score	Studio score	Week total	Final total	Result
Amaury & Camila	10	10	8.5	8.7	8.6	45.8	9.5	—N/a	55.3	3rd
Klara & Daniel	10	10	8.3	8.5	8.4	45.2	9.0	—N/a	54.2	6th
Henri & Tati	10	10	8.2	8.4	8.3	44.9	9.1	—N/a	54.0	7th
Talitha & Dennis	10	10	8.4	8.5	8.5	45.4	9.6	—N/a	55.0	5th
MC Daniel & Paula	10	10	8.3	8.6	8.5	45.4	9.9	—N/a	55.3	3rd
Barbara & Vinícius	10	10	8.8	8.6	8.5	45.9	9.6	—N/a	55.5	2nd
Tati & Diego	10	10	8.5	8.7	8.7	45.9	10	—N/a	55.9	1st

=== Week 7 ===
Week 1 – Group 2

- Style: Kizomba

Artistic judges		Technical judges		
1	2	3	4	5
Bruna Lombardi	Arlete Salles	Carlinhos de Jesus	Ana Botafogo	Zebrinha

Running order

Couple	Judges' score					Total score	Studio score	Week total	Final total	Result
Couple	1	2	3	4	5	Total score	Studio score	Week total	Final total	Result
Lexa & Diego	10	10	8.5	8.5	8.6	45.6	9.6	—N/a	55.2	5th
Micael & Nathália	10	10	8.4	8.6	8.6	45.6	9.5	—N/a	55.1	6th
Bárbara & Vitor	10	10	8.4	8.4	8.4	45.2	9.0	—N/a	54.2	7th
Enrique & Gabe	10	10	8.7	8.7	8.8	46.2	9.9	—N/a	56.1	2nd
Juliano & Dani	10	10	8.7	8.6	8.5	45.8	9.5	—N/a	55.3	4th
Samuel & Lari	10	10	8.7	8.7	8.7	46.1	9.6	—N/a	55.7	3rd
Lucy & Fernando	10	10	8.9	8.8	8.8	46.5	9.7	—N/a	56.2	1st

=== Week 8 ===
Week 2 – Group 1

- Style: Funk (featuring Dennis DJ)

Artistic judges		Technical judges		
1	2	3	4	5
Alice Carvalho	Belo	Carlinhos de Jesus	Ana Botafogo	Zebrinha

Running order

Couple	Judges' score					Total score	Studio score	Week total	Final total	Result
Couple	1	2	3	4	5	Total score	Studio score	Week total	Final total	Result
Tati & Diego	10	10	8.8	8.9	8.8	46.5	9.8	56.3	112.2	1st
Barbara & Vinícius	10	10	8.7	8.7	8.7	46.1	9.2	55.3	110.8	4th
Talitha & Dennis	10	10	8.7	8.7	8.6	46.0	9.2	55.2	110.2	5th
Henri & Tati	10	10	8.6	8.6	8.5	45.7	9.4	55.1	109.1	7th
Klara & Daniel	10	10	8.7	8.7	8.6	46.0	9.5	55.5	109.7	6th
MC Daniel & Paula	10	10	8.8	8.9	8.8	46.5	9.8	56.3	111.6	2nd
Amaury & Camila	10	10	8.8	8.8	8.9	46.5	9.8	56.3	111.6	2nd

=== Week 9 ===
Week 2 – Group 2

- Style: Funk (featuring Pedro Sampaio)

Artistic judges		Technical judges		
1	2	3	4	5
Rafael Portugal	Carolina Dieckmann	Carlinhos de Jesus	Ana Botafogo	Zebrinha

Running order

Couple	Judges' score					Total score	Studio score	Week total	Final total	Result
Couple	1	2	3	4	5	Total score	Studio score	Week total	Final total	Result
Lucy & Fernando	10	10	8.9	9.0	8.8	46.7	9.6	56.3	112.5	2nd
Enrique & Gabe	10	10	8.9	8.9	8.8	46.6	10	56.6	112.7	1st
Bárbara & Vitor	10	10	8.6	8.6	8.5	45.7	9.3	55.0	109.2	7th
Micael & Nathália	10	10	8.6	8.9	8.7	46.2	9.7	55.9	111.0	6th
Samuel & Lari	10	10	8.9	8.9	8.8	46.6	10	56.6	112.3	3rd
Juliano & Dani	10	10	8.8	8.8	8.8	46.4	9.8	56.2	111.5	4th
Lexa & Diego	10	10	8.8	8.8	8.8	46.4	9.7	56.1	111.3	5th

=== Week 10 ===
Week 3 – Group 1

- Style: Tecnobrega

Artistic judges		Technical judges		
1	2	3	4	5
Theresa Fonseca	Heloísa Périssé	Carlinhos de Jesus	Ana Botafogo	Zebrinha

Running order

Couple	Judges' score					Total score	Studio score	Week total	Final total	Result (week 6–10)
Couple	1	2	3	4	5	Total score	Studio score	Week total	Final total	Result (week 6–10)
Henri & Tati	10	10	8.5	8.7	8.6	45.8	9.0	54.8	163.9	Dance-off (7th)
Talitha & Dennis	10	10	8.6	8.8	8.7	46.1	9.3	55.4	165.6	Dance-off (5th)
MC Daniel & Paula	10	10	8.9	9.0	8.9	46.8	9.9	56.7	168.3	2nd
Klara & Daniel	10	10	8.7	8.8	8.7	46.2	9.1	55.3	165.0	Dance-off (6th)
Amaury & Camila	10	10	9.0	9.0	8.8	46.8	9.7	56.5	168.1	3rd
Barbara & Vinícius	10	10	9.0	8.9	8.8	46.7	9.3	56.0	166.8	Dance-off (4th)
Tati & Diego	10	10	10	9.0	9.0	48.0	9.9	57.9	170.1	1st

=== Week 11 ===
Week 3 – Group 2

- Style: Calypso

Artistic judges		Technical judges		
1	2	3	4	5
Pabllo Vittar	Fátima Bernardes	Carlinhos de Jesus	Ana Botafogo	Zebrinha

Running order

Couple	Judges' score					Total score	Studio score	Week total	Final total	Result (week 7–11)
Couple	1	2	3	4	5	Total score	Studio score	Week total	Final total	Result (week 7–11)
Bárbara & Vitor	10	10	8.7	8.8	8.6	46.1	9.1	55.2	164.4	Dance-off (7th)
Juliano & Dani	10	10	8.9	9.0	8.9	46.8	9.8	56.6	168.1	Dance-off (4th)
Lexa & Diego	10	10	9.0	9.0	9.0	47.0	9.7	56.7	168.0	Dance-off (5th)
Samuel & Lari	10	10	8.9	8.9	8.9	46.7	9.6	56.3	168.6	3rd
Lucy & Fernando	10	10	10	9.2	9.1	48.3	9.8	58.1	170.6	1st
Micael & Nathália	10	10	8.8	8.9	8.9	46.6	9.6	56.2	167.2	Dance-off (6th)
Enrique & Gabe	10	10	8.9	9.0	9.0	46.9	9.7	56.6	169.3	2nd

=== Week 12 ===
Couple stage dance-off

- Style: Lindy Hop

Artistic judges		Technical judges		
1	2	3	4	5
Christian Chávez	Camila Queiroz	Carlinhos de Jesus	Ana Botafogo	Zebrinha

Running order

Couple	Judges' votes					Studio's votes	Total votes	Result
Couple	1	2	3	4	5	Studio's votes	Total votes	Result
Talitha & Dennis			✔	✔			2	Eliminated
Micael & Nathália			✔	✔	✔	✔ (66%)	4	Advanced
Klara & Daniel	✔	✔				✔ (53%)	3	Eliminated
Henri & Tati							0	Eliminated
Lexa & Diego	✔	✔	✔	✔	✔		5	Advanced
Bárbara & Vitor							0	Eliminated
Juliano & Dani	✔	✔			✔	✔ (67%)	4	Advanced
Barbara & Vinícius	✔	✔	✔	✔	✔	✔ (84%)	6	Advanced

=== Week 13 ===
Week 1 – Playoffs

- Style: Salsa

Artistic judges		Technical judges		
1	2	3	4	5
Nilson Klava	Deborah Secco	Carlinhos de Jesus	Ana Botafogo	Zebrinha

Running order

Couple	Judges' score					Total score	Studio score	Week total	Final total	Result
Couple	1	2	3	4	5	Total score	Studio score	Week total	Final total	Result
Juliano & Dani	10	10	9.6	9.6	9.2	48.4	9.5	—N/a	57.9	3rd
Lexa & Diego	10	10	9.4	9.4	9.4	48.2	9.6	—N/a	57.8	Eliminated
Enrique & Gabe	10	10	9.3	9.4	9.4	48.1	9.6	—N/a	57.7	Eliminated
Lucy & Fernando	10	10	9.6	9.7	9.7	49.0	10	—N/a	59.0	1st
Samuel & Lari	10	10	9.7	9.7	9.6	49.0	9.8	—N/a	58.8	2nd

=== Week 14 ===
Week 2 – Playoffs

- Style: Salsa

Artistic judges		Technical judges		
1	2	3	4	5
César Tralli	Ticiane Pinheiro	Carlinhos de Jesus	Ana Botafogo	Zebrinha

Running order

Couple	Judges' score					Total score	Studio score	Week total	Final total	Result
Couple	1	2	3	4	5	Total score	Studio score	Week total	Final total	Result
Tati & Diego	10	10	9.7	9.7	9.7	49.1	9.8	—N/a	58.9	2nd
Micael & Nathália	10	10	9.4	9.5	9.6	48.5	9.4	—N/a	57.9	Eliminated
Barbara & Vinícius	10	10	9.6	9.6	9.7	48.9	9.6	—N/a	58.5	3rd
MC Daniel & Paula	10	10	9.4	9.5	9.5	48.4	9.8	—N/a	58.2	Eliminated
Amaury & Camila	10	10	9.7	9.8	9.7	49.2	9.8	—N/a	59.0	1st

=== Week 15 ===
Top 6

- Style: Waltz

Artistic judges		Technical judges		
1	2	3	4	5
Juan Paiva	Nathália Dill	Carlinhos de Jesus	Ana Botafogo	Zebrinha

Running order

Couple	Judges' score					Total score	Studio score	Week total	Final total	Result
Couple	1	2	3	4	5	Total score	Studio score	Week total	Final total	Result
Lucy & Fernando	10	10	9.6	9.6	9.7	48.9	9.6	—N/a	58.5	4th
Samuel & Lari	10	10	9.6	9.7	9.6	48.9	9.7	—N/a	58.6	3rd
Barbara & Vinícius	10	10	9.5	9.6	9.6	48.7	9.5	—N/a	58.2	5th
Juliano & Dani	10	9.9	9.4	9.6	9.5	48.4	9.7	—N/a	58.1	Eliminated
Amaury & Camila	10	10	9.6	9.7	9.7	49.0	9.8	—N/a	58.8	2nd
Tati & Diego	10	10	9.7	9.8	9.7	49.2	9.8	—N/a	59.0	1st

=== Week 16 ===
Top 5

- Style: Flamenco

Artistic judges		Technical judges		
1	2	3	4	5
Gloria Groove	Lilia Cabral	Carlinhos de Jesus	Ana Botafogo	Zebrinha

Running order

Couple	Judges' score					Total score	Studio score	Week total	Final total	Result
Couple	1	2	3	4	5	Total score	Studio score	Week total	Final total	Result
Amaury & Camila	10	10	9.7	9.7	9.8	49.2	9.8	59.0	117.8	2nd
Tati & Diego	10	10	9.6	9.7	9.7	49.0	9.8	58.8	117.8	2nd
Samuel & Lari	10	10	9.7	9.7	9.7	49.1	9.8	58.9	117.5	Bottom two
Barbara & Vinícius	10	10	9.8	9.8	9.8	49.4	9.9	59.3	117.5	Bottom two
Lucy & Fernando	10	10	9.9	9.9	9.9	49.7	9.8	59.5	118.0	1st
Bottom two results
Samuel & Lari	With two couples tied in the final total, the studio audience was asked to vote for their favourite couple. Samuel & Lari were eliminated as the couple with the fewest votes to save.								31%	Eliminated
Barbara & Vinícius	With two couples tied in the final total, the studio audience was asked to vote for their favourite couple. Samuel & Lari were eliminated as the couple with the fewest votes to save.								69%	4th

=== Week 17 ===
Top 4 – Semifinals

- Style: Contemporary

Artistic judges		Technical judges		
1	2	3	4	5
Reynaldo Gianecchini	Juliana Paes	Carlinhos de Jesus	Ana Botafogo	Zebrinha

Running order

Couple	Judges' score					Total score	Studio score	Week total	Final total	Result
Couple	1	2	3	4	5	Total score	Studio score	Week total	Final total	Result
Lucy & Fernando	10	10	10	10	10	50.0	9.8	59.8	177.8	1st (Finalist)
Barbara & Vinícius	10	10	9.8	9.8	9.7	49.3	9.6	58.7	176.4	Eliminated
Tati & Diego	10	10	10	10	9.8	49.8	9.9	59.7	177.5	2nd (Finalist)
Amaury & Camila	10	10	10	10	10	50.0	9.7	59.7	177.5	2nd (Finalist)

=== Week 18 ===
Top 3 – Finals

- Styles: Tango & Samba

Artistic judges		Technical judges		
1	2	3	4	5
Eliana	Ana Maria Braga	Carlinhos de Jesus	Ana Botafogo	Zebrinha

Running order

Tango
Couple	Judges' score					Total score	Studio score	Gshow score	Dance total	Final total	Result
Couple	1	2	3	4	5	Total score	Studio score	Gshow score	Dance total	Final total	Result
Tati & Diego	10	10	9.9	9.9	9.9	49.7	9.6	9.9	69.2	—	N/A
Lucy & Fernando	10	10	10	10	10	50.0	9.6	9.8	69.4	—	N/A
Amaury & Camila	10	10	9.9	10	10	49.9	9.7	9.8	69.4	—	N/A

Samba
Couple	Judges' score					Total score	Studio score	Gshow score	Dance total	Final total	Result
Couple	1	2	3	4	5	Total score	Studio score	Gshow score	Dance total	Final total	Result
Tati & Diego	10	10	10	10	10	50.0	9.8	9.9	69.7	138.9	Final two
Lucy & Fernando	10	10	9.9	9.9	10	49.8	9.5	9.8	69.1	138.5	Third place
Amaury & Camila	10	10	10	10	10	50.0	9.6	9.9	69.5	138.9	Final two
Final two results
Tati & Diego	With two couples tied in the final total, the result was deadlocked and reverted to the earlier Gshow audience combined score. Tati & Diego were the winners as the couple with the highest score (19.8 against Amaury & Camila's 19.7).										Winner
Amaury & Camila	With two couples tied in the final total, the result was deadlocked and reverted to the earlier Gshow audience combined score. Tati & Diego were the winners as the couple with the highest score (19.8 against Amaury & Camila's 19.7).										Runner-up
