= Dança dos Famosos =

Brazilian television series

- Genre: Reality competition
- Based on: Strictly Come Dancing
- Presented by: Current; Luciano Huck; Former; Fausto Silva; Tiago Leifert
- Judges: Current; Ana Botafogo; Carlinhos de Jesus; Zebrinha
- Country of origin: Brazil
- Original language: Portuguese
- No. of seasons: 23
- No. of episodes: 234

Production
- Production location: Estúdios Globo
- Running time: 60–120 minutes

Original release
- Network: TV Globo
- Release: November 20, 2005 – present

Dança dos Famosos (lit. Dance of the Famous) is a Brazilian dance competition show. It premiered on November 20, 2005 on TV Globo as a one-hour segment on Domingão do Faustão, hosted by Fausto Silva. It is based on the British reality television competition Strictly Come Dancing and is part of the Dancing with the Stars franchise.

== Format ==
The show pairs a number of celebrities with professional ballroom dancers who each week compete against each other in a competition to impress a panel of judges and the viewing audience in order to survive potential elimination.

Through telephone voting and social media viewers are able to score each couple based on their performance in a scale ranging from 5 (being the worst) to 10 (being the best). Each guest judge also scored based on the same scale.

The couple receiving the lowest combined total of judges' and audience's scores is eliminated each week until only the champion dance pair remains.

Past celebrity contestants have included professional and Olympic athletes, models, actors, singers and television hosts.

== Series overview ==
Season	Number of		Duration dates	Partners in the finals		
Season	Couples	Weeks	Duration dates	Winner	Runner-up	Third place
1	6	5	Nov. 20 – Dec. 18, 2005	Karina Bacchi; Fabiano Vivas	Alexandre Barillari; Aline Pyrrho	Daniela Escobar; Edson Carneiro
2	6	6	Feb. 12 – Mar. 26, 2006	Juliana Didone; Leandro Azevedo	Kelly Key; Marcelo Chocolate	Pedro Bismark; Nana Nassif
3	12	12	May 14 – Aug. 06, 2006	Robson Caetano; Ivonete Liberato	Stepan Nercessian; Michelle Cerbino	Babi Xavier; Hélio Faria
4	12	13	Mar. 11 – June 17, 2007	Rodrigo Hilbert; Priscila Amaral	Elaine Mickely; Átila Amaral	Carmo Dalla Vecchia; Adriana Mattos
5	10	11	Feb. 24 – May 11, 2008	Christiane Torloni; Álvaro Reis	Rafael Almeida; Jaqueline Fernandes	Samara Felippo; João Ricardo Vieira
6	10	10	Apr. 19 – June 28, 2009	Paolla Oliveira; Átila Amaral	Leandro Hassum; Tamara Fuchs	Jonatas Faro; Priscila Maris
7	12	15	Apr. 11 – July 25, 2010	Fernanda Souza; Alexandre Porcel	Sheron Menezzes; Marcelo Granjeiro	André Arteche; Nana Nassif
8	12	14	May 15 – Sep. 04, 2011	Miguel Roncato; Ana Flavia Simões	Nelson Freitas; Carol Agnelo	Odilon Wagner; Roberta Appratti
9	12	15	May 13 – Sep. 16, 2012	Rodrigo Simas; Raquel Guarini	Cláudia Ohana; Patrick Carvalho	Bárbara Paz; Maurício Wetzel
10	12	14	May 19 – Sep. 15, 2013	Carol Castro; Leandro Azevedo	Bruna Marquezine; Átila Amaral	Tiago Abravanel; Ana Paula Guedes
11	12	15	Aug. 03 – Nov. 30, 2014	Marcello Melo Jr. Raquel Guarini	Paloma Bernardi; Patrick Carvalho	Juliana Paiva; Átila Amaral
12	12	16	Aug. 09 – Dec. 06, 2015	Viviane Araújo; Marcelo Granjeiro	Arthur Aguiar; Mayara Araújo	Mariana Santos; Marcus Lobo
13	12	16	Aug. 28 – Dec. 11, 2016	Felipe Simas; Carol Agnelo	Sophia Abrahão; Rodrigo Oliveira	Rainer Cadete; Juliana Valcezia
14	12	17	Aug. 13 – Dec. 17, 2017	Maria Joana; Reginaldo Sama	Lucas Veloso; Nathalia Melo	Nicolas Prattes; Mayara Araújo
15	12	16	Aug. 19 – Dec. 16, 2018	Léo Jaime; Larissa Parison	Érika Januza; Elias Ustariz	Dani Calabresa; Reginaldo Sama
16	12	17	Aug. 25 – Dec. 22, 2019	Kaysar Dadour; Mayara Araújo	Dandara Mariana; Daniel Norton	Jonathan Azevedo; Tati Scarletti
17	12	13	Sep. 20 – Dec. 20, 2020	Lucy Ramos; Reginaldo Sama	Danielle Winits; Fernando Schellenberg	Giullia Buscacio; Danniel Navarro
18 Super	18	16	May 16 – Aug. 29, 2021	Paolla Oliveira; Leandro Azevedo	Rodrigo Simas; Nathalia Ramos	Dandara Mariana; Diego Maia
19	12	13	Apr. 03 – July 3, 2022	Vitória Strada; Wagner Santos	Vitão; Gabe Cardoso	Ana Furtado; Leandro Azevedo
20	16	16	Mar. 19 – July 2, 2023	Priscila Fantin; Rolon Hô	Carla Diaz; Diego Basilio	Rafa Kalimann; Fernando Perrotti
21	16	18	Mar. 10 – July 7, 2024	Tati Machado; Diego Maia	Amaury Lorenzo; Camila Lobo	Lucy Alves; Fernando Perrotti
22	16	18	Aug. 10 – Dec. 07, 2025	Silvero Pereira; Thais Sousa	Wanessa Camargo; Diego Basilio	Manu Bahtidão; Heron Leal
23	16	18	Aug. 23 – Dec. XX, 2026	TBA; TBA	TBA; TBA	TBA; TBA
