= Priscila Fantin =

Brazilian actress (born 1983)

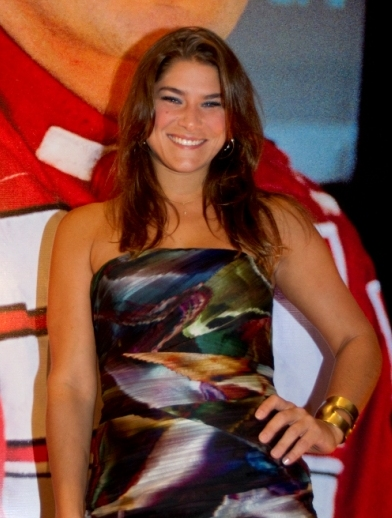
- Fantin at the premiere of the movie Senna in 2010
- Born: Priscila Fantin de Freitas; 18 February 1983 (age 42); Salvador, Bahia, Brazil
- Occupation: Actress
- Years active: 1999–present
- Spouse: Bruno Lopes (m. 2019)
- Children: 1

Priscila Fantin de Freitas (born 18 February 1983) is a Brazilian actress.

== Biography ==
Priscila Fantin was born in Salvador, Bahia, but she was raised in Belo Horizonte, Minas Gerais.

== Career ==
She became famous for her role as Tatiana on the TV series Malhação. After Malhação, she went on to have a successful career, starring in many of Globo's dramas.

Coincidentally, she mostly did historical soaps. Her first one (and first starring role) Esperança who had similar story-line as the successful Terra Nostra flopped. But her next two soaps Chocolate com Pimenta and Alma Gêmea, shown at the afternoon and not at prime-time, were big hits and did amazingly well at the ratings.

== Filmography ==
=== Television ===
Year	Title	Role	Notes
1999	Malhação	Tatiana Almeida Chaves (Tati)	Seasons 6–7 (1999–2001)
2001	As Filhas da Mãe	Joana Rocha	
2002	Esperança	Maria	
2003	Sítio do Picapau Amarelo	Bela	Season 3
2003	Chocolate com Pimenta	Olga Gonçalves Lima	
2004	Celebridade	Herself	Cameo
2004	Oi Mundo Afora	Presenter	
2005	Mad Maria	Luiza	
2005	Alma Gêmea	Serena Anauê Dias	
2007	Sete Pecados	Beatriz Ferraz	
2008	Casos e Acasos	Franciele	Episode: "A Noiva, o Desempregado e o Fiscal"
2009	Priscila no País das Maravilhas	Presenter	
2009	Rally dos Famosos	Herself	Participant (Reality show of Domingão do Faustão)
2009	Superbonita	Presenter	
2010	Tempos Modernos	Nara Nolasco	
2012	As Brasileiras	Berenice	Episode: "A Sambista da BR-116"
2012	Mais Você	Bibi	Participation in framework
2012	Aventuras do Didi	Princess	Christmas special
2013	Cachorrada Vip	Herself	Reality show of Domingão do Faustão
2014	Malhação	Raquel	Season 21; cameo
2014	As Canalhas	Julia	Episode: "Julia, a secretaria ambiciosa"
2014	Lili, a Ex	Grace Kelly	Episode: "Queda Do Muro"
2015	Boogie Oogie	Solange	Cameo
2015	Saltibum	Herself	
2015	Tomara que Caia	Various	
2016	Lili, a Ex	Grace Kelly	Season 2
2016	Êta Mundo Bom!	Diana	
2016	Haja Coração	Herself	Cameo
2023	Dança dos Famosos	Contestant (Winner)	Season 20 winner

=== Film ===
Year	Title	Role	Notes
2006	Cars	Porsche Sally	Brazilian voice dubbing
2008	Orquestra dos Meninos	Creuza	
2010	Alice in Wonderland	White Queen	Brazilian voice dubbing
2014	Chess Game	Mina	
2016	Doidas e Santas		

=== Theater ===
Year	Title	Role
2005	O Herdeiro Milionário	
2008	Vergonha dos Pés	Ana
2010	A Marca do Zorro	Esperança Pulido
2012	A Entrevista	Mariah
2014	"La Bete" (A Besta)	
2015	Sonhos de Um Sedutor	Linda
2016	Por Isso Fui Embora	Pérola

== Personal life ==
On 24 January 2011, after doing a blood test Priscila Fantin had confirmation of her pregnancy with her boyfriend, actor Renan Abreu. On 16 August 2011 Fantin gave birth to her son Romeo with her boyfriend, actor Renan Abreu.
