= Dança dos Famosos season 19 =

Dança dos Famosos
- Season 19
- Celebrity winner: Vitória Strada
- Professional winner: Wagner Santos
- No. of episodes: 13

Release
- Original network: TV Globo
- Original release: April 3 – July 3, 2022

Season chronology
- ← Previous; Season 18 Next → Season 20

Dança dos Famosos 2022 is the nineteenth season of the Brazilian reality television show Dança dos Famosos which premiered on April 3, 2022, at 7:30 / 6:30 p.m. (BRT / AMT) on TV Globo, following a cast reveal special that aired on March 27.

It is the first season hosted by Luciano Huck and airing as a segment on Domingão com Huck, following Fausto Silva's departure from the network and, subsequently, the cancellation of Domingão do Faustão.

On July 3, 2022, actress Vitória Strada & Wagner Santos won the competition over singer Vitão & Gabe Cardoso and TV host Ana Furtado & Leandro Azevedo, who took 2nd and 3rd place respectively.

Vitória is the show's third openly LGBT celebrity champion (following season 7's Fernanda Souza and season 9's Rodrigo Simas) and the first to be out at the time of her win.

== Couples ==
The celebrities and professionals were officially revealed by TV Globo on March 27, 2022. However, the couples were not announced in advance and were only revealed during the two-week season premiere.

Celebrity	Notability (known for)	Professional	Status	Ref.
Ana Furtado Returned on May 22	TV host	Leandro Azevedo	Withdrew on May 8, 2022	
Zezé Polessa	Actress	Hugo Frade	Eliminated 1st on May 8, 2022	
GKay	Digital influencer	Rodrigo Thomaz	Eliminated 2nd on May 8, 2022	
Tierry	Singer	Carla Torres	Eliminated 3rd on May 15, 2022	
Vitão Returned on May 22	Singer	Gabe Cardoso	Eliminated 4th on May 15, 2022	
Xande de Pilares	Singer	Lore Improta	Eliminated 5th on May 15, 2022	
Gil do Vigor	Digital influencer	Mayara Rosa	Eliminated 6th on May 29, 2022	
Douglas Souza	Volleyball player	Bia Marques	Eliminated 7th on June 5, 2022	
Jojo Todynho	Singer	Rolon Ho	Eliminated 8th on June 12, 2022	
Jéssica Ellen	Actress	Marcus Lobo	Withdrew on June 26, 2022	
Sergio Menezes	Actor	Mariana Torres	Eliminated 9th on June 26, 2022	
Ana Furtado	TV host	Leandro Azevedo; Jefferson Bilisco (week 9)	Third place on July 3, 2022	
Vitão	Singer	Gabe Cardoso	Runner-up on July 3, 2022	
Vitória Strada	Actress	Wagner Santos; Jefferson Bilisco (week 11)	Winner on July 3, 2022	

== Elimination chart ==
Couple	Place	1	2	3	4	5	1+3+5	6	2+4+6	7	8	9	10	11	12	11+12	13
Vitória & Wagner	1	46.4	—N/a	46.9	—N/a	46.9		—N/a	48.0	48.7	48.8	49.4	98.2	100			
Vitão & Gabe	2	—N/a	44.6	—N/a	46.5	—N/a		47.0	138.1	6/12	48.2	—N/a	48.7	48.4	49.6	98	99.9
Ana & Leandro	3	45.9	—N/a	47.0	—N/a	—	92.9			5/12	—N/a	48.0	48.5	48.6	48.9	97.5	99.6
Sergio & Mariana	4	—N/a	46.4	—N/a	46.3	—N/a		46.8		47.8	—N/a	48.5	48.3	49.3	97.6		
Jéssica & Marcus	5	46.6	—N/a	46.5	—N/a	46.8			47.9	—N/a	48.1	48.5	—				
Jojo & Rolon	6	46.0	—N/a	46.1	—N/a	46.6			—N/a	47.9	47.8						
Douglas & Bia	7	—N/a	45.8	—N/a	46.4	—N/a		46.8		—N/a	47.8						
Gil & Mayara	8	—N/a	46.2	—N/a	46.4	—N/a		46.8		47.6							
Xande & Lore	9	—N/a	45.7	—N/a	46.2	—N/a		46.8		1/12							
Tierry & Carla	10	—N/a	45.2	—N/a	46.0	—N/a		46.2		0/12							
GKay & Rodrigo	11	45.1	—N/a	46.5	—N/a	46.7	138.3			0/12							
Zezé & Hugo	12	45.7	—N/a	46.1	—N/a	46.3	138.1			0/12							

Lowest score
Highest score
Dance-off
Saved last
Eliminated
Withdrew

Winner
Runner-up
Third place

== Weekly results ==
=== Week 1 ===
Week 1 – Women

- Style: Forró

Artistic judges		Technical judges		
1	2	3	4	5
Renato Góes	Fátima Bernardes	Carlinhos de Jesus	Ana Botafogo	Zebrinha

Running order

Couple	Judges' score					Total score	Studio score	Week total	Final total	Result
Couple	1	2	3	4	5	Total score	Studio score	Week total	Final total	Result
GKay & Rodrigo	10	10	8.5	8.7	7.9	45.1	8.8	53.9	—	6th
Zezé & Hugo	10	10	8.5	8.6	8.6	45.7	8.5	54.2	—	5th
Jéssica & Marcus	10	10	8.6	9.0	9.0	46.6	9.6	56.2	—	1st
Ana & Leandro	10	10	8.6	8.9	8.5	45.9	9.2	55.1	—	4th
Jojo & Rolon	10	10	8.6	8.8	8.6	46.0	9.5	55.5	—	3rd
Vitória & Wagner	10	10	8.5	9.0	8.9	46.4	9.5	55.9	—	2nd

=== Week 2 ===
Week 1 – Men

- Style: Forró

Artistic judges		Technical judges		
1	2	3	4	5
Chay Suede	Letícia Colin	Carlinhos de Jesus	Ana Botafogo	Zebrinha

Running order

Couple	Judges' score					Total score	Studio score	Week total	Final total	Result
Couple	1	2	3	4	5	Total score	Studio score	Week total	Final total	Result
Sergio & Mariana	10	10	8.7	8.9	8.8	46.4	9.9	56.3	—	1st
Tierry & Carla	9.8	9.5	8.5	8.6	8.8	45.2	9.8	55.0	—	5th
Xande & Lore	10	10	8.5	8.6	8.6	45.7	9.8	55.5	—	4th
Douglas & Bia	10	10	8.5	8.6	8.7	45.8	9.9	55.7	—	3rd
Vitão & Gabe	9.5	9.5	8.4	8.6	8.6	44.6	9.8	54.4	—	6th
Gil & Mayara	10	10	8.6	8.9	8.7	46.2	9.9	56.1	—	2nd

=== Week 3 ===
Week 2 – Women

- Style: Rock

Artistic judges		Technical judges		
1	2	3	4	5
Lilia Cabral	Marina Ruy Barbosa	Carlinhos de Jesus	Ana Botafogo	Zebrinha

Running order

Couple	Judges' score					Total score	Studio score	Week total	Final total	Result
Couple	1	2	3	4	5	Total score	Studio score	Week total	Final total	Result
Jojo & Rolon	10	10	8.8	8.7	8.6	46.1	9.9	56.0	111.5	4th
Jéssica & Marcus	10	10	8.7	8.9	8.9	46.5	9.9	56.4	112.6	2nd
Zezé & Hugo	10	10	8.6	8.7	8.8	46.1	9.8	55.9	110.1	6th
Gkay & Rodrigo	10	10	8.8	8.8	8.9	46.5	10	56.5	110.4	5th
Vitória & Wagner	10	10	8.9	9.0	9.0	46.9	9.9	56.8	112.7	1st
Ana & Leandro	10	10	8.9	9.1	9.0	47.0	10	57.0	112.2	3rd

=== Week 4 ===
Week 2 – Men

- Style: Rock

Artistic judges		Technical judges		
1	2	3	4	5
Alanis Guillen	Cristiana Oliveira	Carlinhos de Jesus	Ana Botafogo	Zebrinha

Running order

Couple	Judges' score					Total score	Studio score	Week total	Final total	Result
Couple	1	2	3	4	5	Total score	Studio score	Week total	Final total	Result
Douglas & Bia	10	10	8.8	8.8	8.8	46.4	9.8	56.2	111.9	3rd
Xande & Lore	10	10	8.7	8.8	8.7	46.2	9.8	56.0	111.5	4th
Sergio & Mariana	10	10	8.7	8.9	8.7	46.3	9.8	56.1	112.4	1st
Vitão & Gabe	10	10	8.8	8.9	8.8	46.5	9.9	56.4	110.8	6th
Gil & Mayara	10	10	8.8	8.8	8.8	46.4	9.9	56.3	112.4	2nd
Tierry & Carla	10	10	8.6	8.7	8.7	46.0	9.8	55.8	110.8	5th

=== Week 5 ===
Week 3 – Women

- Style: Funk

Artistic judges		Technical judges		
1	2	3	4	5
Angélica	Déa Lúcia	Carlinhos de Jesus	Ana Botafogo	Zebrinha

Running order

Couple	Judges' score					Total score	Studio score	Week total	Final total	Result (week 1–5)
Couple	1	2	3	4	5	Total score	Studio score	Week total	Final total	Result (week 1–5)
Zezé & Hugo	10	10	8.7	8.8	8.8	46.3	9.8	56.1	166.2	Dance-off
Gkay & Rodrigo	10	10	8.8	9.0	8.9	46.7	9.9	56.6	167.0	Dance-off
Jojo & Rolon	10	10	8.7	8.9	9.0	46.6	10	56.6	168.1	3rd
Vitória & Wagner	10	10	8.8	9.1	9.0	46.9	10	56.9	169.6	1st
Jéssica & Marcus	10	10	8.8	9.0	9.0	46.8	10	56.8	169.4	2nd
Ana & Leandro	Did not perform due to COVID-19							00.0	112.2	Dance-off

=== Week 6 ===
Week 3 – Men

- Style: Funk

Artistic judges		Technical judges		
1	2	3	4	5
Karine Teles	Mateus Solano	Carlinhos de Jesus	Ana Botafogo	Zebrinha

Running order

Couple	Judges' score					Total score	Studio score	Week total	Final total	Result (week 2–6)
Couple	1	2	3	4	5	Total score	Studio score	Week total	Final total	Result (week 2–6)
Tierry & Carla	9.7	10	8.7	8.9	8.9	46.2	9.8	56.0	166.8	Dance-off
Gil & Mayara	10	10	8.8	9.0	9.0	46.8	9.9	56.7	169.1	1st
Vitão & Gabe	10	10	8.9	9.1	9.0	47.0	10	57.0	167.8	Dance-off
Sergio & Mariana	10	10	8.7	9.1	9.0	46.8	9.8	56.6	169.0	2nd
Douglas & Bia	10	10	8.8	9.0	9.0	46.8	9.9	56.7	168.6	3rd
Xande & Lore	10	9.9	9.0	9.0	8.9	46.8	9.8	56.6	168.1	Dance-off

=== Week 7 ===
Dance-off

- Style: Reggaeton

Artistic judges		Technical judges		
1	2	3	4	5
Ana Maria Braga	Taís Araújo	Carlinhos de Jesus	Ana Botafogo	Zebrinha

Running order

Couple	Judges' votes					Jury votes	Studio votes	Week total	Final total	Result
Couple	1	2	3	4	5	Jury votes	Studio votes	Week total	Final total	Result
Ana & Leandro	✔	✔	✔	✔	✔	5		—	5	Advanced
Tierry & Carla						0		—	0	Eliminated
Zezé & Hugo						0		—	0	Eliminated
Xande & Lore						0	✔	—	1	Eliminated
Gkay & Jefferson						0		—	0	Eliminated
Vitão & Gabe	✔	✔	✔	✔	✔	5	✔	—	6	Advanced

=== Week 8 ===
Group 1

- Style: Sertanejo

Artistic judges		Technical judges		
1	2	3	4	5
Cauã Reymond	Tatá Werneck	Carlinhos de Jesus	Ana Botafogo	Zebrinha

Running order

Couple	Judges' score					Total score	Studio score	Week total	Final total	Result
Couple	1	2	3	4	5	Total score	Studio score	Week total	Final total	Result
Gil & Mayara	10	10	9.2	9.2	9.2	47.6	10	—	57.6	Eliminated
Vitão & Gabe	10	10	9.4	9.4	9.4	48.2	10	—	58.2	1st
Jéssica & Marcus	10	10	9.3	9.3	9.3	47.9	9.9	—	57.8	2nd
Sergio & Mariana	10	10	9.2	9.3	9.3	47.8	9.9	—	57.7	3rd

=== Week 9 ===
Group 2

- Style: Sertanejo

Artistic judges		Technical judges		
1	2	3	4	5
Leandro Lima	Deborah Secco	Carlinhos de Jesus	Ana Botafogo	Zebrinha

Running order

Couple	Judges' score					Total score	Studio score	Week total	Final total	Result
Couple	1	2	3	4	5	Total score	Studio score	Week total	Final total	Result
Vitória & Wagner	10	10	9.4	9.3	9.3	48.0	9.9	—	57.9	1st
Ana & Jefferson	10	10	9.4	9.3	9.3	48.0	9.8	—	57.8	3rd
Douglas & Bia	10	10	9.3	9.3	9.2	47.8	9.9	—	57.7	Eliminated
Jojo & Rolon	10	10	9.3	9.3	9.3	47.9	10	—	57.9	1st

=== Week 10 ===
Top 6

- Style: Salsa

Artistic judges		Technical judges		
1	2	3	4	5
Juliette Freire	Grazi Massafera	Carlinhos de Jesus	Ana Botafogo	Renato Vieira

Running order

Couple	Judges' score					Total score	Studio score	Week total	Final total	Result
Couple	1	2	3	4	5	Total score	Studio score	Week total	Final total	Result
Sergio & Mariana	10	10	9.5	9.5	9.5	48.5	9.8	—	58.3	4th
Ana & Leandro	10	10	9.5	9.5	9.5	48.5	9.9	—	58.4	3rd
Jéssica & Marcus	10	10	9.4	9.4	9.3	48.1	9.8	—	57.9	5th
Jojo & Rolon	10	10	9.3	9.3	9.2	47.8	9.9	—	57.7	Eliminated
Vitão & Gabe	10	10	9.5	9.6	9.6	48.7	9.9	—	58.6	1st
Vitória & Wagner	10	10	9.6	9.6	9.5	48.7	9.9	—	58.6	1st

=== Week 11 ===
Top 5

- Style: Tango

Artistic judges		Technical judges		
1	2	3	4	5
Maisa Silva	Patrícia Poeta	Carlinhos de Jesus	Ana Botafogo	Zebrinha

Running order

Couple	Judges' score					Total score	Studio score	Week total	Final total	Result
Couple	1	2	3	4	5	Total score	Studio score	Week total	Final total	Result
Vitão & Gabe	10	10	9.4	9.5	9.5	48.4	9.9	58.3	116.9	2nd
Vitória & Jefferson	10	10	9.6	9.6	9.6	48.8	10	58.8	117.4	1st
Sergio & Mariana	10	10	9.4	9.5	9.4	48.3	9.8	58.1	116.4	4th
Ana & Leandro	10	10	9.6	9.5	9.5	48.6	9.8	58.4	116.8	3rd
Jéssica & Marcus	10	10	9.4	9.6	9.5	48.5	10	58.5	116.4	4th

=== Week 12 ===
Top 5 Redux – Semifinals

- Style: Contemporary

Artistic judges		Technical judges		
1	2	3	4	5
José Loreto	Rafa Kalimann	Carlinhos de Jesus	Claudia Motta	Zebrinha

Running order

Couple	Judges' score					Total score	Studio score	Week total	Final total	Result
Couple	1	2	3	4	5	Total score	Studio score	Week total	Final total	Result
Jéssica & Marcus	Did not perform due to COVID-19							00.0	116.4	Withdrew
Vitória & Wagner	10	10	9.8	9.8	9.8	49.4	10	59.4	176.8	1st (Finalist)
Ana & Leandro	10	10	9.7	9.7	9.7	49.1	9.8	58.9	175.7	3rd (Finalist)
Sergio & Mariana	10	10	9.8	9.8	9.7	49.3	9.9	59.2	175.6	Eliminated
Vitão & Gabe	10	10	9.9	9.9	9.8	49.6	10	59.6	176.6	2nd (Finalist)

=== Week 13 ===
Top 3 – Finals

- Styles: Waltz & Samba

Artistic judges		Technical judges		
1	2	3	4	5
Murilo Benício	Paolla Oliveira	Carlinhos de Jesus	Ana Botafogo	Zebrinha

Running order

Waltz
Couple	Judges' score					Total score	Studio score	Gshow score	Dance total	Final total	Result
Couple	1	2	3	4	5	Total score	Studio score	Gshow score	Dance total	Final total	Result
Ana & Leandro	10	10	10	9.9	9.9	49.8	9.9	9.2	68.9	—	N/A
Vitória & Wagner	10	10	10	10	10	50.0	10	10	70.0	—	N/A
Vitão & Gabe	10	10	10	10	10	50.0	10	10	70.0	—	N/A

Samba
Couple	Judges' score					Total score	Studio score	Gshow score	Dance total	Final total	Result
Couple	1	2	3	4	5	Total score	Studio score	Gshow score	Dance total	Final total	Result
Ana & Leandro	10	10	9.9	10	9.9	49.8	9.9	9.0	68.7	137.6	Third place
Vitória & Wagner	10	10	10	10	10	50.0	10	9.9	69.9	139.9	Winner
Vitão & Gabe	10	10	9.9	10	10	49.9	10	9.8	69.7	139.7	Runner-up
