= Silvero Pereira =

Brazilian actor and director (born 1982)

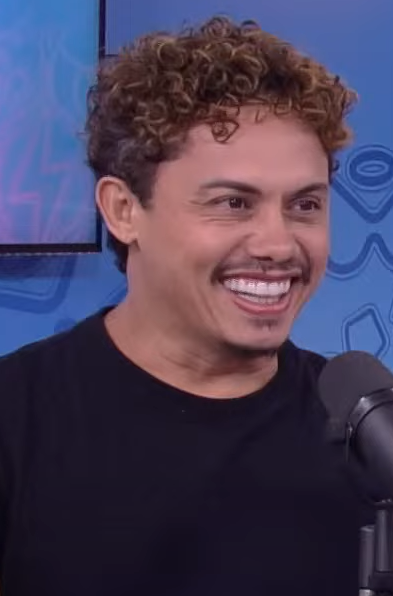
- Pereira in 2024
- Born: 20 June 1982 (age 44); Mombaça, Ceará, Brazil
- Education: Federal Institute of Ceará
- Occupations: Actor, director
- Years active: 2000–present

Silvero Pereira (born 20 June 1982) is a Brazilian actor and director. He has a degree in performing arts from the Federal Institute of Ceará.

== Career ==
Silvero started his artistic career at the age of 17 doing theatre. He has been married for ten years to the playwright from Rio de Janeiro, Rafael Barbosa. In addition to working with groups from Ceará, he founded two companies in Fortaleza: Inquieta Cia. de Teatros and Coletivo Artístico As Travestidas. The artistic collective As Travestidas was founded by Silvero fourteen years ago. Composed of transsexual and transvestite actors, actresses and artists, the project is carried out in Fortaleza and has already produced seven shows, with seasons in the South and Southeast regions.

His film debut was in the feature film Serra Pelada (2013), which later became a series on Globo. During a performance of the play BR-Trans in Rio de Janeiro, Silveiro was discovered by Glória Perez, who invited him to participate in the nine o'clock soap opera, A Força do Querer (2017). For this work, he was nominated in the 22nd edition of the Best of the Year Award from Brazil in the category best new actor.

His recognition grew when he starred in the film Bacurau, by Kleber Mendonça Filho and Juliano Dornelles. For this role, Silvero won several awards, including the Grande Prêmio do Cinema Brasileiro.

In 2021, it was announced that Silvero will play fashion designer Clodovil Hernandes in a series directed by Rodrigo Cesar.

== Filmography ==
Year	Title	Character	Director	Notes
2013	Serra Pelada	Severino	Heitor Dhalia	Feature
2017	A Força do Querer	Nonato	Rogério Gomes	Telenovela
2017	Copa 181		Dannon Lacerda	Feature
2017	No Fim de Tudo	Josy	Victor Ciriaco	Short-film
2019	Bacurau	Lunga	Kleber Mendonça Filho	Feature
2021	Fantasma Neon	Felipe	Leonardo Martinelli	Short-film
2022	Me Tira da Mira		Hsu Chien Hsin	Feature
2022	Welcome to Quixeramobim	Heron	Halder Gomes	Feature
2022	Pantanal	Zaqueu		Telenovela
2024	Maníaco do Parque	Francisco de Assis Pereira	Maurício Eça	Feature
2024	The Masked Singer Brasil	Bode		Reality singing competition
2025	Garota do Momento	Érico / Verônica Queen	Jeferson De and Natália Grimberg	Telenovela
2025	Dança dos Famosos	Contestant (Winner)		Season 22
