= Milton Cunha =

Brazilian carnival designer and academic

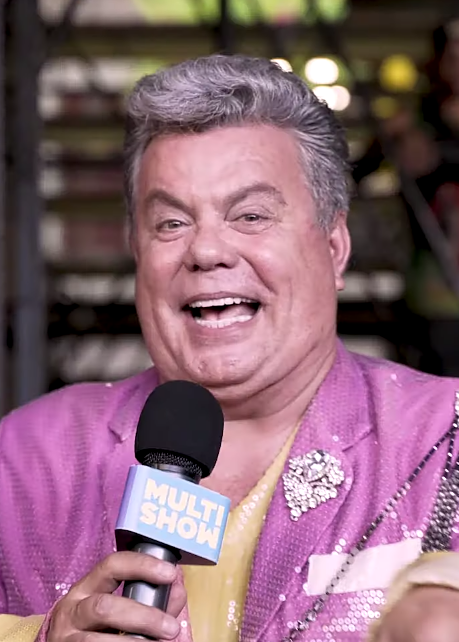
- Born: March 19, 1962 (age 63); Belém, Pará, Brazil
- Occupations: carnival designer, set designer and commentator

Milton Reis da Cunha Júnior (born March 19, 1962) is a Brazilian carnival designer (carnavalesco), set designer, psychologist, university professor and carnival commentator. He holds a master's and doctorate in Literature (Literary Science) from the Federal University of Rio de Janeiro. Since 2013, he has been a commentator on the Rio de Janeiro samba school parade on TV Globo.

== Biography ==
He was born in Belém and raised on Marajó Island. Misunderstood by his family due to his homosexuality, Milton, at the age of 19, moved from Pará to Rio de Janeiro in 1982, never seeing his parents in person again. Then he started working with nightclub owner Chico Recarey, who was his first patron. He graduated in Psychology. Ten years later, encouraged by the honorary president of the Beija-Flor samba school, Anísio Abraão David, Milton Cunha became a carnival designer. He inherited Joãosinho Trinta's office as a carnival designer, working at Beija-Flor from 1994 to 1997.

He has worked in several samba schools, such as the União da Ilha do Governador, Leandro of Itaquera from São Paulo, Unidos da Tijuca, São Clemente, Unidos do Viradouro, Porto da Pedra and Acadêmicos do Cubango. In 2007, he worked at the Brazilian Carnival Ball, where he was until the last edition of the ball until 2012. He worked as a carnival designer from 2010 to 2013 at Sierras del Carnaval, a samba school in San Luis, Argentina. He also carried out work related to carnival in Stockholm, London and Johannesburg and worked as a set designer for shows by artists such as Luan Santana and Ney Matogrosso. He is the artistic director of the Cidade do Samba shows, where he has been since 2007.

Since 2013, he has been a commentator on the Rio de Janeiro samba school parade on TV Globo and previously, since 2002, he commented on several access and champion parades for CNT and Band, and on Band itself, he was a commentator for the Parintins Folklore Festival.

Milton Cunha was married to a Physical Education teacher Eduardo Costa from 2007 to 2024. They met online.

== Works ==
- Carnaval é cultura: Poética e técnica no fazer escola de samba (2015)
- Viva e aproveite: O primeiro ano do resto de nossas vidas (2021)
