= Ana Botafogo =

Brazilian ballet dancer and actress

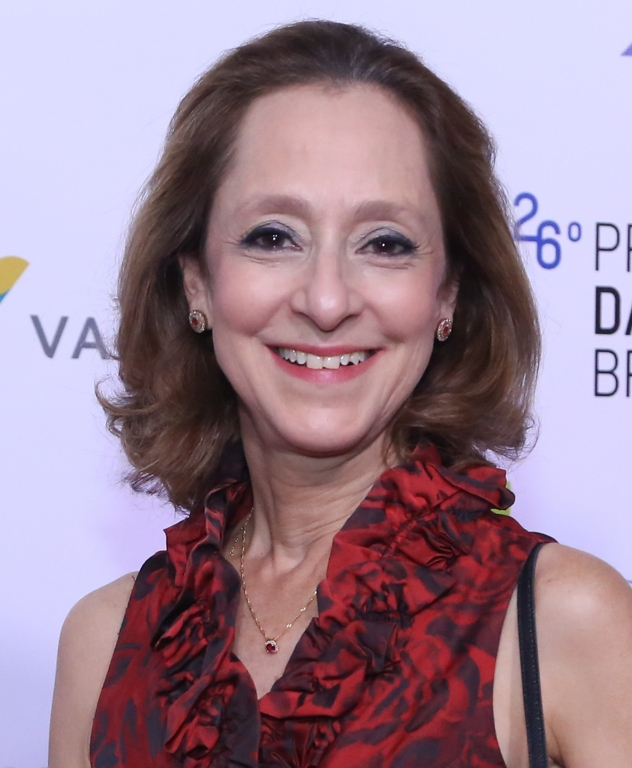
- Ana Botafogo in 2015
- Born: 9 July 1957 (age 68); Rio de Janeiro, Brazil
- Occupation: Ballet dancer
- Career
- Current group: Theatro Municipal do Rio de Janeiro
- Website: Official website

Ana Botafogo (born 9 July 1957) is a Brazilian ballet dancer and actress.

== Biography ==
Born in Rio de Janeiro, she started her studies in her hometown and to dance professionally in France, at the Ballet de Marseille. Botafogo also attended the Salle Pleyel's Goubé Academy at Paris, École supérieure de danse de Cannes Rosella Hightower, and Dance Center-Covent Garden, in London.

Botafogo has been the prima ballerina of Theatro Municipal do Rio de Janeiro since 1981.

She debuted in the Municipal with the ballet Coppélia, which opened her career to international presentations. She made a special participation as an actress in the TV Globo telenovela Páginas da Vida, playing the ballet teacher Elisa, daughter of the characters played by Tarcísio Meira and Glória Menezes.

== Filmography ==
=== Television ===
- 1996 – Não Fuja da Raia ... Andrea
- 2006 – Páginas da Vida .... Elisa Fragoso Martins de Andrade Telles
- 2009 – Viver a Vida .... as herself
- 2015 – Malhação .... as herself
- 2020 – Salve-se Quem Puder .... as herself
