= List of 2008 films based on actual events =

This is a list of films and miniseries that are based on actual events. All films on this list are from American production unless indicated otherwise.

== 2008 ==
- 21 (2008) – heist drama film inspired by the story of the MIT Blackjack Team as told in Bringing Down the House, the best-selling 2003 book by Ben Mezrich
- 120 (2008) – Turkish war drama film based on the true story of 120 children who died in 1915 carrying ammunition for the Battle of Sarikamish against the Russians during World War I
- 1895 (Mandarin: 1895乙未) (2008) – Taiwanese historical film based on the Japanese Invasion of Taiwan in 1895, with emphasis on the Hakka fighters and their families in the conflict
- A Frozen Flower (Korean: 쌍화점) (2008) – South Korean historical thriller film loosely based on the reign of Gongmin of Goryeo
- A Pearl in the Forest (Mongolian: Мойлхон) (2008) – Mongolian historical drama film about a young couple whose newly planned life was destroyed by the impact of the Great Purge of 1934–1938 in Mongolia, based on testimonies of many Buryats and Mongolians who were persecuted during the Great Purges initiated by Joseph Stalin
- A Single Woman (2008) – biographical drama film based on the life of Jeannette Rankin, the first woman to be elected to congress, and chronicling her activism including her association with the Women's International League for Peace and Freedom, as well as her co-founding the American Civil Liberties Union
- A Viking Saga (2008) – Danish historical film about the early life and rise to power of Oleg of Novgorod, the Rus prince who attacked and conquered Kiev in AD 882 from the Rus war-lords Askold and Dir, before moving his capital there
- A Woman in Berlin (German: Anonyma – Eine Frau in Berlin) (2008) – German-Polish biographical war drama film about a woman who tries to survive the invasion of Berlin by the Soviet troops during the last days of World War II, based on the memoir, Eine Frau in Berlin
- Aba (Sinhala: අබා) (2008) – Sri Lankan historical drama film based on the historical legend of King Pandukabhaya which is set in Sri Lanka more than 2,400 years ago
- Accidental Friendship (2008) – Canadian drama television film about a homeless woman with her two pets as her only friends, based on a true story
- Admiral (Russian: Адмиралъ) (2008) – Russian biographical drama film about Alexander Kolchak, a vice admiral in the Imperial Russian Navy and leader of the anti-communist White movement during the Russian Civil War
- Adoration (2008) – Canadian romantic drama film partly based on the 1986 Hindawi affair
- Alexander (Russian: Александр. Невская битва) (2008) – Russian historical action film about the life and reign of Alexander Nevsky
- The Alphabet Killer (2008) – thriller horror film loosely based on the Alphabet murders that took place in Rochester, New York between 1971 and 1973
- Amália (2008) – Portuguese biographical drama film portraying legendary Portuguese fado singer Amália Rodrigues
- American Violet (2008) – crime drama film based on the story of Regina Kelly, a victim of Texas police drug enforcement tactics
- Anton (2008) – Irish action thriller film about a man drawn into the Troubles along the Northern Ireland Border in 1972, inspired by true events
- The Baader Meinhof Complex (German: Der Baader Meinhof Komplex) (2008) – German drama film retelling the story of the early years of the West German far-left terrorist organisation the Rote Armee Fraktion (Red Army Fraction, or Red Army Faction, a.k.a. RAF) from 1967 to 1977
- Baby Blues (2008) – biographical horror film based on the 2001 killings of five children by their mother Andrea Yates
- The Bank Job (2008) – American-British-Australian heist thriller film based on the 1971 burglary of Lloyds Bank safety deposit boxes in Baker Street
- Bathory (2008) – Slovak-Czech-Hungarian-British historical drama film based on the story of Erzsébet Bathory, a Hungarian countess in the 16th and 17th centuries
- Beloved Clara (German: Geliebte Clara) (2008) – German-French-Hungarian biographical drama film about the pianist Clara Schumann and her marriage with the composer Robert Schumann
- Bezerra de Menezes: The Diary of a Spirit (Portuguese: Bezerra de Menezes: O Diário de um Espírito) (2008) – Brazilian biographical drama film depicting the life and work of writer, politician and medical doctor Bezerra de Menezes, known as the doctor of the poor
- Billy: The Early Years (2008) – biographical drama film telling the story of the early life of evangelist Billy Graham
- Blood Brothers (Dutch: Bloedbroeders) (2008) – Dutch crime television film based on the Baarn murder case, which took place between 1960 and 1963
- Blood in May (Spanish: Sangre de mayo) (2008) – Spanish historical drama film depicting the story around the events of 2 May 1808, when the people of Madrid rose up in rebellion against French occupation
- Bottle Shock (2008) – comedy drama film based on the 1976 wine competition termed the "Judgment of Paris", when California wine defeated French wine in a blind taste test
- Broken Sun (2008) – Australian war film partly based on the Cowra breakout of 1944
- Bronson (2008) – British biographical prison drama film following the life of Charles Bronson, considered Britain's most violent criminal, who has been responsible for a dozen or so cases of hostage taking while incarcerated
- Cadillac Records (2008) – biographical drama film exploring the musical era from the early 1940s to the late 1960s, chronicling the life of the influential Chicago-based record-company executive Leonard Chess, and a few of the musicians who recorded for Chess Records
- Camino (2008) – Spanish biographical drama film inspired by the real story of Alexia González-Barros, a girl who died from spinal cancer at age 14 in 1985 and who is in process of canonization
- Cape No. 7 (Mandarin: 海角七號) (2008) – Taiwanese musical drama film about a Yunlin postman who successfully delivered a piece of mail addressed in the old Japanese style – the sender was the former Japanese employer of the recipient
- The Capture of the Green River Killer (2008) – crime drama miniseries telling the story of the Green River killer serial murders between 1982 and 1998
- Carnera: The Walking Mountain (Italian: Carnera – Il campione più grande) (2008) – Italian sport drama film depicting real life events of the boxer Primo Carnera
- Cass (2008) – British crime drama film based on the true story of the life of Cass Pennant
- Céline (2008) – Canadian biographical film about the life of Canadian singer Celine Dion
- Changeling (2008) – mystery crime drama film based on real-life events, specifically the 1928 Wineville Chicken Coop murders in Mira Loma, California
- The Chaser (Korean: 추격자) (2008) – South Korean action thriller film inspired by real-life Korean serial killer Yoo Young-chul
- Che: Guerrilla (Spanish: Che: Guerrilla) (2008) – Spanish-German-French-American biographical drama film about Argentine Marxist revolutionary Ernesto "Che" Guevara during the Bolivian Campaign
- Che: The Argentine (Spanish: Che, el argentino) (2008) – Spanish-German-French-American biographical drama film about Argentine Marxist revolutionary Ernesto "Che" Guevara during the Cuban Revolution
- The Children of Huang Shi (Mandarin: 黄石的孩子) (2008) – Australian-Chinese-German historical war drama film centring on the true story of George Hogg and the sixty orphans that he led across China in an effort to save them from conscription during the Second Sino-Japanese War
- The Christmas Choir (2008) – Canadian drama television film based upon a true story of a man who volunteered to work at a homeless shelter and started a choir with its residents
- Christmas Cottage (2008) – biographical drama film about the inspiration behind Thomas Kinkade's painting The Christmas Cottage, and how the artist was motivated to begin his career after discovering his mother was in danger of losing their family home
- City of Vice (2008) – British historical crime drama miniseries following the fortunes of the famous novelist Henry Fielding and his brother John
- Clubbed (2008) – British drama film about a 1980s factory worker who takes up a job as a club doorman based on a true story
- Coco Chanel (2008) – Italian-French-British biographical drama television film about Coco Chanel, the pioneering French fashion designer
- Colours of Passion (Hindi: रंग रसिया) (2008) – Indian Hindi-language biographical drama film based on the life of the 19th-century Indian painter Raja Ravi Varma
- The Curse of Steptoe (2008) – British biographical drama television film centring on Harry H. Corbett and Phil Davis' on- and off-screen relationship during the making of the BBC sitcom Steptoe and Son
- Cyrano de Bergerac (2008) – biographical drama television film following the broad outlines of Cyrano de Bergerac's life
- December Heat (Estonian: Detsembrikuumus) (2008) – Estonian historical action drama film about the 1924 Estonian coup d'état attempt
- Defiance (2008) – war drama film based on Nechama Tec's 1993 book Defiance: The Bielski Partisans, an account of the eponymous group led by Polish Jewish brothers who saved and recruited Jews in Belarus during the Second World War
- The Deity (Italian: Il divo) (2008) – Italian biographical drama film based on the figure of former Italian Prime Minister Giulio Andreotti
- The Demons of St. Petersberg (Italian: I demoni di San Pietroburgo) (2008) – Italian drama film about the life of Russian writer Fyodor Dostoevsky
- The Deserter (French: Le déserteur) (2008) – Canadian French-language historical war film telling the story of Georges Guénette, a deserter from the Canadian Army during World War II, who was shot and killed by members of the Royal Canadian Mounted Police
- The Duchess (2008) – French-Italian-British-American historical drama film about the late 18th-century English aristocrat Georgiana Cavendish, Duchess of Devonshire
- The Easy Way (French: Sans arme, ni haine, ni violence) (2008) – French heist drama film about the real life thief Albert Spaggiari, who organized a break-in into a Société Générale bank in Nice, France in 1976
- The Edge of Love (2008) – British biographical romantic drama film concerning Welsh poet Dylan Thomas, his wife Caitlin Macnamara and their married friends, the Killicks
- Einstein (2008) – Italian biographical drama television film based on real life events of scientist Albert Einstein
- Einstein and Eddington (2008) – British biographical drama television film about Albert Einstein's general theory of relativity, his relationship with Arthur Stanley Eddington and the introduction of this theory to the world, against the backdrop of the Great War and Eddington's eclipse observations
- Emma Smith: My Story (2008) – biographical drama film focusing on the life of Emma Smith, wife of Joseph Smith, restorer of the Latter Day Saint movement
- The Escorial Conspiracy (Spanish: La conjura de El Escorial) (2008) – Spanish historical drama film based on the murder of Juan de Escobedo during the reign of Philip II of Spain
- Everlasting Moments (Swedish: Maria Larssons eviga ögonblick) (2008) – Swedish biographical drama film based on the true story of Maria Larsson, a Swedish working-class woman in the early 20th century, who wins a camera in a lottery and goes on to become a photographer
- Everybody Dies but Me (Russian: Все умрут, а я останусь) (2008) – Russian coming-of-age drama film about three teenage girls preparing for their first school disco based on Valeriya Gai Germanika's previous documentary work
- The Express: The Ernie Davis Story (2008) – sport drama film based on the life of Syracuse University football player Ernie Davis, the first African American to win the Heisman Trophy
- Fab Five: The Texas Cheerleader Scandal (2008) – biographical drama television film based on real-life events that occurred at McKinney North High School in McKinney, Texas, in 2006, five teenage cheerleaders became notorious for truancies, violations of the school dress code, and general disrespect to the school community
- Felon (2008) – prison drama film based on events that took place in the 1990s at the notorious California State Prison, Corcoran
- Fifty Dead Men Walking (2008) – British-Canadian-Irish crime thriller film about Martin McGartland, a British agent who went undercover into the Provisional Irish Republican Army (IRA)
- Filth: The Mary Whitehouse Story (2008) – British biographical drama television film recounting the initial campaigning activities of the British morality campaigner Mary Whitehouse
- Firaaq (Hindi: फिराक) (2008) – Indian Hindi-language drama film set one month after the 2002 violence in Gujarat, India and looks at the aftermath in its effects on the lives of everyday people
- Flame & Citron (Danish: Flammen & Citronen) (2008) – Danish-German historical drama film about two Danish resistance movement fighters nicknamed Flammen and Citronen, during the Nazi occupation of Denmark in World War II
- Flash of Genius (2008) – biographical drama film focusing on Robert Kearns and his legal battle against the Ford Motor Company after they developed an intermittent windshield wiper based on ideas the inventor had patented
- Forever Enthralled (Mandarin: 梅蘭芳) (2008) – Chinese biographical drama film following the life of Mei Lanfang, one of China's premiere opera performers
- Forever the Moment (Korean: 우리 생애 최고의 순간) (2008) – South Korean sport drama film depicting a fictionalized account of the South Korea women's handball team which competed in the 2004 Summer Olympics
- Front of the Class (2008) – biographical drama film depicting Brad Cohen's life with Tourette syndrome and how it inspired him to teach other students
- Frost/Nixon (2008) – American-British-French historical drama film telling the story behind the Frost/Nixon interviews of 1977
- Gautama Buddha (Hindi: बुद्ध) (2008) – Indian Hindi-language religious drama film about the life and times of the Buddha
- Generation Kill (2008) – war drama miniseries based on Evan Wright's 2004 book Generation Kill, about his experience as an embedded reporter with the US Marine Corps' 1st Reconnaissance Battalion during the 2003 invasion of Iraq
- Gomorrah (Italian: Gomorra) (2008) – Italian crime drama film about the Casalesi clan, a crime syndicate within the Camorra — a traditional criminal organization based in Naples and Caserta, in the southern Italian region of Campania, based on the non-fiction book of the same name by Roberto Saviano
- Gruber's Journey (Romanian: Călătoria lui Gruber) (2008) – Romanian drama film centring on an Italian writer named Curzio Malaparte, who was a member of the Italian Fascist Party
- Haber (2008) – biographical war short film recounting the work of Fritz Haber in developing chemical weapons for the German Army during World War I
- Hancock and Joan (2008) – British biographical drama television film based on the affair between the comedian Tony Hancock and Joan Le Mesurier, the third wife of actor John Le Mesurier
- Hansie (2008) – South African biographical sport drama film based on the true story of cricketer Hansie Cronje
- The Homeless Student (Japanese: ホームレス中学生) (2008) – Japanese biographical drama film based on Hiroshi Tamura's experiences of being homeless during high school after the breakup of his parents
- House of Saddam (2008) – British biographical drama miniseries charting the rise and fall of Saddam Hussein
- How to Lose Friends & Alienate People (2008) – British comedy film based on the memoir of the same name by Toby Young about his failed five-year effort to make it in the United States as a contributing editor at Condé Nast Publications' Vanity Fair magazine
- Hunger (2008) – Irish-British historical drama film about the 1981 Irish hunger strike
- The Hurt Locker (2008) – war thriller film following an Iraq War Explosive Ordnance Disposal team who are targeted by insurgents and shows their psychological reactions to the stress of combat, based on accounts of Mark Boal, a freelance journalist who was embedded with an American bomb squad in the war in Iraq for two weeks in 2004
- In Love with Barbara (2008) – British biographical drama television film inspired by the life of the romantic novelist Barbara Cartland, which tells the story of what made her the Queen of Romance
- Ip Man (Cantonese: 葉問) (2008) – Hong Kong biographical martial arts film based on the life of Ip Man, a grandmaster of the martial art Wing Chun and teacher of Bruce Lee
- Jodhaa Akbar (Hindi: जोधा अकबर) (2008) – Indian Hindi-language epic historical romance film showing the life and romance between the Muslim Emperor Akbar of Mughal Empire and a Hindu Princess Jodhaa Bai of Amber, who married him on a political marriage
- John Adams (2008) – biographical drama miniseries chronicling most of U.S. president John Adams's political life and his role in the founding of the United States
- The Kautokeino Rebellion (Norwegian: Kautokeino-opprøret) (2008) – Norwegian historical drama film based on the true story of the Kautokeino rebellion in 1852, in response to the Norwegian exploitation of the Sámi community at that time
- The Last Confession of Alexander Pearce (2008) – Australian-Irish historical Western drama film following the final days of Irish convict and bushranger Alexander Pearce's life as he awaits execution
- Last Stop 174 (Portuguese: Última Parada 174) (2008) – Brazilian crime thriller film depicting a fictionalized account of the life of Sandro Rosa do Nascimento, a street kid in Rio de Janeiro that survived the Candelária massacre and, in 2000, hijacked a bus
- Lemon Tree (Hebrew: עץ לימון; Arabic: شجرة ليمون) (2008) – Israeli-Palestinian drama film describing the legal efforts of a Palestinian widow to stop the Israeli Defense Minister, her next door neighbor, from destroying the lemon trees in her family farm – based on a real incident
- The Lena Baker Story (2008) – historical crime film chronicling the life and death of Lena Baker, an African-American woman in Georgia who was convicted in 1945 of capital murder and was the only woman to be executed by electric chair
- Little Ashes (2008) – British-Spanish biographical romance film about the friendship between surrealist painter Salvador Dalí and the poet Federico García Lorca which develops into a love affair
- Little Girl Lost: The Delimar Vera Story (2008) – biographical crime drama television film following the events surrounding the kidnapping and rescue of Delimar Vera, the newborn daughter of Luz Cuevas and Pedro Vera
- Living Proof (2008) – biographical medical drama television film about Dr. Dennis Slamon, a doctor who tries to find a cure for breast cancer
- The Long Walk to Finchley (2008) – British biographical drama television film based on the early political career of the young Margaret Thatcher (née Roberts), from her attempts to gain a seat in Dartford in 1949 via invasion to her first successful campaign to win a parliamentary seat, Finchley, in 1959
- The Longshots (2008) – comedy sport drama film based on the real life events of Jasmine Plummer, the first girl to participate in the Pop Warner football tournament with the Harvey Colts led by head coach Richard Brown Jr.
- Machan (2008) – Italian-Sri Lankan comedy film based on the actual case of the 2004 incident, where a fake Sri Lankan national handball team tricked its way into a German tournament, lost all of their matches, and subsequently vanished
- Manolete (2008) – Spanish-British-American-German biographical drama film about bullfighter Manuel Laureano Rodríguez Sánchez, better known as "Manolete"
- Mark of an Angel (French: L'Empreinte de l'ange) (2008) – French thriller film focusing on a single mother who becomes sure that the child of an affluent couple is the daughter she lost in a maternity ward fire six years earlier, based on a true story
- Marley & Me (2008) – comedy drama film based on the 2005 memoir of the same name by John Grogan
- Max Manus: Man of War (Norwegian: Max Manus) (2008) – Norwegian biographical war film based on the real events of the life of resistance fighter Max Manus
- Mayerthorpe (2008) – Canadian biographical drama television film about the Mayerthorpe tragedy of 2005, in which four Royal Canadian Mounted Police officers were shot and killed while executing a search warrant against an illegal marijuana growing operation on the Mayerthorpe, Alberta
- Mesrine: Killer Instinct (French: Mesrine: L'instinct de mort) (2008) – French-Canadian biographical crime film depicting Jacques Mesrine's life from 1959 to 1972, beginning with his time as a member of the French Army during the Algerian War, where he was forced to shoot and kill prisoners and bomb-makers
- Mesrine: Public Enemy No. 1 (French: Mesrine: L'ennemi public No 1) (2008) – French-Canadian biographical crime film about Jacques Mesrine's life from 1972 until 2 November 1979, the day of his death
- Milk (2008) – biographical drama film based on the life of gay rights activist and politician Harvey Milk, who was the first openly gay man to be elected to public office in California, as a member of the San Francisco Board of Supervisors
- Mogadischu (2008) – German thriller television film chronicling the events surrounding the hijacking of Lufthansa Flight 181 by the Popular Front for the Liberation of Palestine in 1977
- My Marlon and Brando (Turkish: Gitmek: Benim Marlon ve Brandom) (2008) – Turkish drama film based on a real life story where a Turkish woman struggles to meet her lover from Iraqi Kurdistan
- My Name Ain't Johnny (Portuguese: Meu Nome Não É Johnny) (2008) – Brazilian biographical crime drama film narrating the true story of João Guilherme Estrella, an upper-middle-class man from the State of Rio de Janeiro that would become the head of luxury drug trafficking for the wealthy elite in the late 1980s and early 1990s
- North Face (German: Nordwand) (2008) – German historical survival film based on the famous 1936 attempt to climb the Eiger north face
- Nothing but the Truth (2008) – political drama film portraying the case of journalist Judith Miller, who in July 2005 was jailed for contempt of court for refusing to testify before a federal grand jury investigating a leak naming Valerie Plame as a covert CIA operative
- The Ode (2008) – Indian-American biographical drama film about the life of a young, gay, Indian man who flees to America, based on actual events
- The Other Boleyn Girl (2008) – British-American historical romantic drama film depicting a fictionalized account of the lives of 16th-century aristocrats Mary Boleyn, one-time mistress of King Henry VIII, and her sister, Anne, who became the monarch's ill-fated second wife
- Oye Lucky! Lucky Oye! (Hindi: ओए लकी! लकी ओए!) (2008) – Indian Hindi-language comedy film inspired by the real life shenanigans of Devinder Singh alias Bunty, a real-life "super-chor", originally from Vikaspuri, Delhi
- Passchendaele (2008) – Canadian war drama film focusing on the experiences of a Canadian soldier at the Battle of Passchendaele, also known as the Third Battle of Ypres, inspired by stories that Paul Gross heard from his grandfather, a First World War soldier
- The Passion (2008) – British Christian drama miniseries telling the story of the last week in the life of Jesus
- Pattenrai: A Tale of Water on the Southern Island (Japanese: パッテンライ!! 〜南の島の水ものがたり) (2008) – Japanese anime biographical film portraying the career of Yoichi Hatta, a civil engineer active in Japanese Taiwan, and his interactions with the native Taiwanese
- Paul VI: The Pope in the Tempest (Italian: Paolo VI – Il Papa nella tempesta) (2008) – Italian biographical television film based on real life events of Roman Catholic Pope Paul VI
- Phantom Punch (2008) – biographical sport drama film about the life and career of Sonny Liston
- The Poker House (2008) – biographical drama film based on Lori Petty's early life during the 1970s
- Portrait of a Beauty (Korean: 미인도) (2008) – South Korean biographical drama film portraying Joseon-era painter Sin Yun-bok (better known by his pen name, Hyewon) as being a woman disguised as a man
- Racing for Time (2008) – biographical sport drama television film based on the accomplishment of real life coach and prison guard Sergeant Noel Chestnut (later promoted to lieutenant) and the Ventura Youth Correctional Facility's track team he started
- Ramchand Pakistani (Urdu: رام چند پاکستانی) (2008) – Pakistani drama film based on a true story of a boy who inadvertently crosses the border between Pakistan and India and the following ordeal that his family has to go through
- Recount (2008) – political drama television film about Florida's vote recount during the 2000 United States presidential election
- The Red Baron (German: Der Rote Baron) (2008) – British-German biographical action war film about the World War I flying ace Manfred von Richthofen, known as the "Red Baron"
- Red Cliff (Mandarin: 赤壁) (2008) – international coproduction epic war film based on the Battle of Red Cliffs and the events at the end of the Han dynasty and immediately prior to the Three Kingdoms period in Imperial China
- Sagan (2008) – French biographical drama film following French author Françoise Sagan's road to fame, her drug abuse, alcoholism, and gambling, her hedonistic lifestyle spending too much and becoming poor, as well as several complex love affairs with both men and women
- Séraphine (2008) – French-Belgian biographical drama film following the life of a middle-aged housekeeper, Séraphine Louis, who has a remarkable talent for painting
- Sex and Lies in Sin City (2008) – biographical crime drama television film detailing the events surrounding the death of Las Vegas casino owner Ted Binion
- The Sicilian Girl (Italian: La siciliana ribelle) (2008) – Italian crime drama film inspired by the story of Rita Atria, a key witness in a major Mafia investigation in Sicily
- Silent Wedding (Romanian: Nunta mută) (2008) – Romanian comedy drama film about a young couple who was about to celebrate their marriage in 1953, but they were ordered to desist by the occupying Red Army and Communist authorities because the Soviet leader Joseph Stalin had died the night before, inspired by a real story
- Skin (2008) – South African-British biographical drama film based on the life of Sandra Laing, a South African woman born to white parents, who was classified as "Coloured" during the apartheid era, presumably due to a genetic case of atavism
- Stone of Destiny (2008) – British-Canadian historical adventure film depicting the story of the removal of the Stone of Scone from Westminster Abbey
- The Stoning of Soraya M. (Persian: .سنگسار ثريا م) (2008) – drama film about Soraya Manutchehri, a 35-year-old woman who was stoned to death in the small village of Kuhpayeh, Iran, after being accused of adultery
- Sugar (2008) – sport drama film following the story of Miguel Santos, also known as Sugar, a Dominican pitcher from San Pedro de Macorís, struggling to make it to the big leagues and pull himself and his family out of poverty
- Telstar: The Joe Meek Story (2008) – British biographical drama film about record producer Joe Meek, which opened at the New Ambassadors Theatre in London's West End in June 2005
- Touching Home (2008) – sport drama film depicting the true story about a father struggling to make amends with his twin sons as they pursue their dreams of professional baseball
- The Two Mr. Kissels (2008) – crime drama television film chronicling the lives and murders of brothers Robert and Andrew Kissel
- Valkyrie (2008) – American-German war thriller film depicting the 20 July plot in 1944 by German army officers to assassinate Adolf Hitler and to use the Operation Valkyrie national emergency plan to take control of the country
- Victor (2008) – Canadian biographical drama television film about the life and career of Victor Davis, a Canadian Olympic swimmer who was killed in a hit and run accident just months after his retirement from competitive swimming
- W. (2008) – biographical comedy drama film based on the life of George W. Bush
- Waltz with Bashir (Hebrew: ואלס עם באשיר) (2008) – Israeli animated war drama film depicting director Ari Folman's search for lost memories of his experience as a soldier during the 1982 Lebanon War and the Sabra and Shatila massacre
- The Wave (German: Die Welle) (2008) – German political thriller film based on Ron Jones' social experiment The Third Wave
- What Doesn't Kill You (2008) – crime drama film loosely based on the true life story of the film's director Brian Goodman, detailing his own exploits involved with South Boston's Irish Mob
- Who Do You Love? (2008) – biographical drama film about American record producer Leonard Chess
- Wild Blood (Italian: Sanguepazzo) (2008) – Italian biographical drama film telling the story of two renowned actors of the Fascist cinema, Luisa Ferida and Osvaldo Valenti, who were supporters of the Italian Social Republic
- Winter in Wartime (Dutch: Oorlogswinter) (2008) – Dutch war drama film based on Jan Terlouw's eponymous 1972 novel which was inspired by the author's own recollections and experiences
- Worlds Apart (Danish: To verdener) (2008) – Danish biographical drama film about a 17-year-old Jehovah's Witness girl who struggles to reconcile her faith and her secret romance with a non-believer boy, based on a true story
- Your Name Here (2008) – surreal biographical drama film loosely based on the life of Philip K. Dick
