= Gretchen Egolf =

American actress

- Born: 1973 or 1974 (age 52–53)
- Education: Juilliard School (BFA)
- Occupation: Actress
- Years active: 1994–present
- Spouse: Adam Chodzko
- Relatives: Tristan Egolf (brother)

Gretchen Egolf (born 1973 or 1974) is an American theater, film and television actress.

== Early years ==
Egolf is a native of Lancaster, Pennsylvania. Her parents are Paula and Gary Egolf. She graduated from Hempfield High School in 1991 and from Juilliard School in 1995. She received the Michel St. Denis Award as an exceptional graduating drama student at Juilliard. Writer Tristan Egolf was her brother. She began taking classes in acting when she was 10, and she participated in drama in high school and community productions.

== Career ==
=== Television and film ===
Gretchen Egolf is most known for her various television roles, including Journeyman (NBC, 2007), Roswell (WB, 2000), and Law & Order: Special Victims Unit (NBC, 2009–2012), among others, and the TV movies The Two Mr. Kissels (Lifetime 2008) and Gleason (CBS, 2002).

Her film roles include The Talented Mr. Ripley, The Namesake, and Quiz Show.

=== Theatre ===
After winning the Michel St. Denis Award for an Exceptional Graduating Drama Student from the Juilliard School, Egolf went on to perform on Broadway in Jackie, An American Life by Gip Hoppe (also in London's West End) and Jean Anouilh’s Ring Round the Moon with Lincoln Center for the Performing Arts on Broadway, directed by Gerald Gutierrez. Off-Broadway, Egolf has appeared in Davey Holmes’ More Lies About Jerzy at The Vineyard Theater and a number of new plays with Second Stage Theatre, The Flea Theater (in Polly Draper’s Getting Into Heaven), The Women's Project Theatre, and Dodger Stages (now New World Stages) (in Modern Orthodox, directed by James Lapine).

Egolf has also worked in many American regional theaters. She received critical acclaim for her Blanche DuBois in A Streetcar Named Desire at The Guthrie Theater (directed by John Miller-Stephany), Emma in Betrayal at the Huntington Theatre Company (directed by Maria Aitken), Helena in A Midsummer Night's Dream at The Old Globe Theatre, Candida in Candida and Rosalind (As You Like It) at Pittsburgh Public Theater, Emily in Arthur Miller's Resurrection Blues at Wilma Theater (Philadelphia) and other plays with Berkshire Theater Festival (including Hay Fever with Joanne Woodward) and Barrington Stage Company, with whom she is an Artistic Associate

=== Other projects ===
Egolf has been involved in a number of artist films and videos, including Beth Campbell’s Some Things Change (2005), and Adam Chodzko’s video installation Knots at Tate Britain (2013) as well as Chodzko's radio and performance piece, Rising (2013), for solo actor, which she performed live in Newcastle, UK at the Great North Run/British Science Festival, and at Manchester University, UK at the Ways of Seeing Climate Change conference (October 2013). Egolf has also created written works, such as her invited guest contribution to the online experimental art curatorial project Out of Focus. She also wrote a blog of her rehearsal experience playing Blanche DuBois in A Streetcar Named Desire at The Guthrie Theater. As a director and producer; Egolf created and directed the short film Sonnet 147 for the New York Shakespeare Exchange's Sonnet Project and co-produced and starred in the short film Speck's Last and the web series Selectmen.

=== Teaching ===
Egolf is a teacher of the Michael Chekhov acting technique. She has taught in the US at The Guthrie Theater and Barrington Stage Company, as well as independent classes in New York City, and in London at the Royal Central School of Speech and Drama, London Academy of Music and Dramatic Art, and independent classes.

== Personal life ==
Egolf married artist Adam Chodzko.

== Filmography ==
=== Television ===
- Cracker – "Nina", 1 episode, 1997
- Martial Law- "Amy Dylan", 1999–2000
- Roswell- "Vanessa Whitaker", 4 episodes, 2000
- A Nero Wolfe Mystery – "Marian Hinckley", "The Doorbell Rang", 2001
- Corsairs, 2002
- Law & Order – "Sherri Rosatti", 1 episode, 2002
- Without a Trace – 1 episode, 2003
- Journeyman- "Katie Vasser", 2007
- Knight Rider – "Tess Landafly", 1 episode, 2008
- Medium- "Mary Stacey", 2 episodes, 2008
- NCIS – "Detective Andrea Sparr", 1 episode, 2008
- Ghost Whisperer – "Deborah Marks", 1 episode, 2009
- Criminal Minds- "Sarah Murphy", 1 episode, 2009
- Lie to Me- "Catherine", 1 episode, 2009
- CSI: Miami – "Ellen Sheffield", 1 episode, 2009
- Eden- 2011
- Blue Bloods- "Ann Cleary", 1 episode, 2011
- The Good Wife- "Mia Lambros", 1 episode, 2011
- Law & Order: Special Victims Unit – "ADA Kendra Gill", 4 episodes, 2009–2012
- Elementary - "Mrs. Buckner", 1 episode, 2014
- Doctor Who – "The Zygon Invasion", 2015
- Hijack- "Adelaide", 2023

=== Movies ===
- Quiz Show, – 1994
- The Talented Mr. Ripley – "Fran", 1999
- Nicolas, 2001
- Gleason- "Genevieve Halford", 2002
- The Namesake- "Astrid", 2006
- Falling for Grace - "Bridget", 2006
- The Two Mr. Kissels- "Haley Wolff", 2008
- The Son - "Dr Leiner", 2022

== Theater credits ==
=== Broadway ===
- Ring Round the Moon – "Isabelle". Belasco Theatre, Lincoln Center on Broadway, New York, 1999, directed by Gerald Gutierrez.
- Jackie: An American Life – Belasco Theatre, New York, 1997–98, directed by Gip Hoppe. Also at Queen's Theatre, London, 1998.

=== Off-Broadway ===
- More Lies About Jerzy – "Georgia". Vineyard Theatre, New York, 2001, directed by Darko Tresnjak.
- All This Intimacy – "Jen". Second Stage Theatre, New York, 2006.
- Modern Orthodox – "Hannah". Dodger Stages (now New World Stages), New York, 2005, directed by James Lapine.
- Getting into Heaven – "Rose". The Flea Theater, New York, 2003.
- Crocodiles in the Potomac. Women's Project Theater, New York, 1995, directed by Suzanne Bennett.
- Speed-the-Plow – "Karen". The Alchemy Theatre Company at Arclight Theatre, New York, 1995.
- Speck's Last – "Greta". Atlantic Theater Company, New York, 2004, directed by Michael Dowling.

=== Regional theater ===
- Candida – "Candida." Directed by Ted Pappas, Pittsburgh Public Theater, Pittsburgh, 2014.
- Arcadia – "Hannah." Directed by Carey Perloff, American Conservatory Theater, San Francisco, 2013.
- Much Ado about Nothing – "Beatrice." Directed by Julianne Boyd, Barrington Stage Company, Pittsfield, Massachusetts, 2013.
- Betrayal – "Emma." Directed by Maria Aitken, Huntington Theatre Company, Boston, 2012.
- As You Like It – Rosalind. Directed by Ted Pappas, Pittsburgh Public Theater, Pittsburgh, 2012.
- A Streetcar Named Desire – "Blanche DuBois". Directed by John Miller-Stephany, The Guthrie Theatre, Minneapolis, 2010.
- Private Lives – "Amanda." Directed by Julianne Boyd, Barrington Stage Company, Pittsfield, Massachusetts, 2008.
- A Picasso – "Ms Fischer". Directed by Tyler Marchant, Barrington Stage Company, Pittsfield, Massachusetts, 2007.
- Going to St. Ives – "Dr Cora Gage." Directed by Tyler Marchant, Barrington Stage Company, Pittsfield, Massachusetts, 2001.
- Design for Living – "Gilda." Directed by Michael Kahn, Shakespeare Theatre Company, Washington, D.C., 2009.
- The Secret Letters of Jackie and Marilyn – "Jackie." Directed by Leonard Foglia, Pittsburgh Public Theater, Pittsburgh, 2006.
- Boston Marriage – "Claire". Directed by Michael Dowling, Chester Theater, Massachusetts 2005.
- Resurrection Blues – "Emily Shapiro" Directed by Jiri Ziska, Wilma Theater (Philadelphia),
- A Midsummer Night's Dream – "Helena." Directed by Kyle Donnelly, Old Globe Theatre, San Diego, 2001.
- Indiscretions – "Madeleine.", Coconut Grove Playhouse, Florida, 1995.
- Hay Fever – "Sorel Bliss." (with Joanne Woodward), Berkshire Theater Festival, Stockbridge, Massachusetts, 1996.
- Keely and Du – "Keely", Berkshire Theater Festival, Stockbridge, Massachusetts, 1995.
- Four Dogs and a Bone, Berkshire Theater Festival, Stockbridge, Massachusetts, 1995.
- The Illusion, Berkshire Theater Festival, Stockbridge, Massachusetts. 1995.
