= Linha Direta =

Brazilian 1990 television series

- Written by: Monica Almeida, Gian Carlo Belotti, Ali Kamel, Ricardo Vilela
- Presented by: Pedro Bial
- Country of origin: Brazil
- Original language: Portuguese

Production
- Production company: Rede Globo

Original release
- Network: Rede Globo
- Release: March 29 – July 5, 1990
- Release: May 27, 1999 – December 6, 2007
- Release: May 4, 2023 – June 27, 2024

Linha Direta was a Brazilian television program produced by TV Globo and originally aired on Thursday nights. Similar in style and loosely based on the United States program, America's Most Wanted, this program has helped the Brazilian authorities apprehend many criminals at large trying to escape justice.

There were two special editions of the program: Linha Direta Justiça that presented famous Brazilian crimes, like the Candelária massacre, the death of Josef Mengele and the Jules Rimet Trophy theft in Rio de Janeiro; and the Linha Direta Mistério, about stories of the supernatural, like the Operação Prato, the legend of the thirteen souls that died on the Joelma fire and cases of NDE.

All shows feature reenactments using actors as well as interviews with journalists and principal characters.

On September 2, 2022, columnist Patrícia Kogut from the newspaper O Globo revealed in her column that the program would return to TV Globo's programming in 2023. Subsequently, May 4 was confirmed as the premiere date for the program's return, which will now be hosted by Pedro Bial and aired on Thursday nights, as before, after the series Cine Holliúdy. The program's artistic director is Monica Almeida, with general direction by Gian Carlo Belotti. The final script is by Pedro Bial and Marcel Souto Maior, with production by Anelise Franco and genre direction by Mariano Boni. The new episodes will also be available as podcasts on Globoplay and other audio platforms.

On August 30, 2024, TV Globo decided to cancel the program once again. The network stated that, although the program had received positive feedback, it was removed due to “commercial reasons”.

== See also ==
- Globo Network
