= Bus 174 =

2002 Brazilian documentary film directed by José Padilha

- Bus 174 DVD cover
- Directed by: José Padilha; Felipe Lacerda
- Written by: Bráulio Mantovani; José Padilha
- Produced by: José Padilha; Marcos Prado
- Starring: Sandro do Nascimento
- Cinematography: Marcelo Duarte; Cezar Moraes
- Edited by: Felipe Lacerda
- Music by: Sacha Amback; João Nabuco
- Production company: Zazen Produções
- Distributed by: Zazen Produções
- Release date: October 22, 2002 (São Paulo Film Festival)
- Running time: 118 minutes
- Country: Brazil
- Language: Portuguese (Brazilian)
- Box office: $217,201

Bus 174 (Portuguese: Ônibus 174) is a 2002 Brazilian documentary film. It is the directorial debut of director José Padilha and co-director Felipe Lacerda.

== Overview ==
In 2000, Sandro do Nascimento, a young man from a poor background, held passengers on a bus hostage for four hours. The event was caught live on television. The movie examines the incident and life in the slums and favelas of Rio de Janeiro and how the criminal justice system in Brazil treats the lower classes. Padilha in the film talks to former and current street children, Rio police officers, the Rio BOPE police tactical unit, Nascimento's family members and sociologists to gain insight into what led Nascimento to carry out the hijacking.

== People involved ==
- Sandro
- Julieta (aunt)
- Dona Elza (adopted mother)
- Janaina (hostage)
- Willians (hostage)
- Lucianna (hostage)
- Luciana (hostage)
- Daviana (hostage)
- Geisa (hostage)
- Soares (sociologist)
- Yvonne (social worker)

== Distribution ==
Bus 174's distribution was supported mainly by U.S. distributor Cinemax Reel Life (HBO), and ThinkFilm. With the rise of U.S. distribution companies in Brazil, some say that domestic success of the film hinged on their support or that of Gob Filmes, a film production company founded in 1990 by Globo Television Networks.

After its release in 2002 at the São Paulo Film Festival, Bus 174 was shown around the world, in many films festivals from Rio de Janeiro to Netherlands, and the Philippines. It received critical acclaim, and was presented with awards such as the 2004 Peabody Award and the Amnesty Award, in the Netherlands.

The film has also been featured as an Official Selection at the multiple film festivals including:

- Palm Springs (2004)
- Vancouver (2003)
- Sundance (2003)
- Starz Denver (2003)
- Sydney (2003)
- San Francisco (2003)

== Reception ==
Bus 174 was voted "one of the ten best films of the year" by The New York Times. It has won over 23 prizes worldwide, including an Emmy Award for Outstanding Cultural & Artistic Programming in 2005 (after being shown on HBO/Cinemax with great success), and the Amnesty Award in the Netherlands and a Peabody Award.

On the review aggregator website Rotten Tomatoes, the film holds an approval rating of 96%, based on 79 reviews, with an average rating of 8.2/10. The website's consensus reads, "Bus 174 uses real-life tragedy as the grist for a gripping -- and terribly thought-provoking -- look at societal tensions and police violence." On Metacritic, the film has a weighted average score of 83 out of 100, based on 27 critics, indicating "universal acclaim".

== See also ==
- Sandro Rosa do Nascimento
- Candelária massacre
- List of hostage crises
- Last Stop 174
