= Last Stop 174 =

2008 film directed by Bruno Barreto

- DVD cover
- Directed by: Bruno Barreto
- Written by: Bráulio Mantovani
- Produced by: Patrick Siaretta; Paulo Dantas; Bruno Barreto; Antoine de Clermont-Tonnerre
- Starring: André Ramiro; Douglas Silva; Anna Cotrim; Michel Gomes; Cris Vianna; Marcello Melo Jr. Gabriela Luiz; Tay Lopez; Rafael Logan
- Cinematography: Antoine Héberlé
- Edited by: Letícia Giffoni
- Music by: Marcelo Zarvos
- Production companies: Bia Salgado; Ricardo Blat; Rogério Blat
- Distributed by: Paramount Pictures
- Release dates: September 6, 2008 (TIFF); October 24, 2008 (Brazil)
- Running time: 110 minutes
- Country: Brazil
- Language: Portuguese

Last Stop 174 (Portuguese: Última Parada 174) is a 2008 Brazilian biographical crime drama film directed by Bruno Barreto, written by Bráulio Mantovani, produced by Moonshot Pictures and starring Michel Gomes and Marcello Melo Jr.. The film relates a fictionalized account of the life of Sandro Rosa do Nascimento, a street kid in Rio de Janeiro that survived the Candelária massacre and, in 2000, hijacked a bus. On September 16, 2008, the film was chosen by the Ministry of Culture as the representative of Brazil in the Oscar competition for best foreign film at the ceremony in 2009, but was not nominated.

In rigorous reconstruction of the facts, the film was set in locations of downtown Rio de Janeiro, as the Candelária Church, the neighborhood of the Jardim Botânico, Tavares Bastos' favela (slum) and Curicica, over eight weeks, between July, August and September 2007.

== Plot ==
Last Stop 174 tells the story of Sandro Rosa do Nascimento, who in 2000 hijacked Bus 174 in Jardim Botânico, a violent hijacking that has vividly stuck with Brazilians.

The film opens with a woman giving her child (Alessandro) up at gunpoint to a man collecting debts. This woman soon finds religion as a means of salvation, marrying a pastor. She believes that God will help her find Sandro. However, the Sandro the woman finds is not her son—it is another boy (Sandro do Nascimento), whose mother was murdered in front of him, prompting him to move to Rio in search of a better life. There, Sandro lived near the Candelária Church, and survived the Candelária massacre in 1993. The film takes the viewer through Sandro's life, showing his various run-ins with the law, his romantic life, and the charity workers that tried to help him in the favela. Despite his knowledge that the religious woman is not his mother, Sandro goes along with it anyway to have a place to live. The final thirty minutes of the film is a dramatization of the Bus 174 hijacking of 2000, showing how the events happened (including the feigned killing of the woman who wrote the lipstick messages, the death of the young teacher on the bus, and the eventual death by asphyxiation of Sandro). The final scene of the film is Sandro's adoptive mother and his friend Alê (whose full name is also Alessandro) at Sandro's funeral.

== Themes ==
Religion/Family: Last Stop 174 invokes ideas of salvation/prevention from crime through religion or family. Religious imagery is frequently juxtaposed with violence, illustrating the divide in Brazil between peace and those seeking peace with those involved in violence, whether it be street kids or the police. Sandro's adoptive mother saves herself through religion and the hope of putting her family back together. Sandro loses his footing when his mother dies, leading him to a life ridden with crime.

Victims: All the characters in Last Stop 174 are victims—some are victims of Sandro and his gang, some are victims of the system. Sandro is an indirect victim of violence when gangsters murder his mother in front of him. Through becoming orphaned at a very young age, Sandro lacks guidance and runs to Rio, where he becomes a victim of a system that doesn't care. As a homeless youth in Rio, Sandro robs and kills people, making them his victims, and indirectly, victims of the system. When Sandro holds up the bus, the lipstick woman tells Sandro that he is the only true victim of the situation, “the situation” being the system - he is the true victim because he is the direct victim, the hostages are only indirect victims.

Prevalence of Violence: Last Stop 174 shows how common violence in Brazil is, and how it is not contained to the favelas. One instance of this is when Sandro and his friend hold up a woman who has her window open in a traffic jam. She gives Sandro what he asks for, but him and his friend shoot her anyhow, in front of a number of cars and no one does anything about it. Furthermore, when Sandro holds up the bus, the lipstick woman casually calls her boss, explaining that she's going to be slightly late to work because she's “just getting mugged.” Her action of casually making a call displays how desensitized Brazilians have become to everyday violence.

== Cast ==
- Michel Gomes as Sandro Rosa do Nascimento
- Cris Vianna as Marisa
- Marcello Melo Jr. as Alê Monstro
- Gabriela Luiz as Soninha
- Anna Cotrim as Walquíria
- Tay Lopez as Jaziel
- Vitor Carvalho as child Sandro
- Jana Guinoud as Maria (Aunt)
- Rodrigo dos Santos as Wagner (Uncle)
- Ramom Francisco as child Patola
- Lucas Rodrigues as child Quico
- Yasmine Luyindula as child Soninha
- Hyago Silva as child Alê Monstro
- Douglas Silva as Patola
- Gleyson Lima as Quico
- Rafael Logan as Meleca
- André Ramiro as Policeman
- Alessandra Cabral as Geni
- Teresa Xavier as Selma
- Maria Delfina as Dr. Jacira

== See also ==
- Bus 174
- List of submissions to the 81st Academy Awards for Best Foreign Language Film
- List of Brazilian submissions for the Academy Award for Best Foreign Language Film
