= Gleason (2002 film) =

2002 American-Canadian television film

- Screenplay by: Rick Podell; Michael Preminger
- Directed by: Howard Deutch
- Starring: Brad Garrett; Saul Rubinek; Gretchen Egolf; Terry Farrell; Kevin Dunn; Danny Wells
- Theme music composer: Chris Boardman
- Countries of origin: United States; Canada
- Original language: English

Production
- Producer: Judy Cairo-Simpson
- Cinematography: Ken Roach; Neil Roach
- Editor: Seth Flaum
- Running time: 120 minutes
- Production companies: Barbara Lieberman Productions; Robert Greenwald Productions; Hallmark Entertainment

Original release
- Network: CBS
- Release: October 13, 2002

Gleason is a 2002 biographical television film written by Rick Powell and Michael Preminger and directed by Howard Deutch, dramatising the life and career of American comedian Jackie Gleason. It starts Brad Garrett as Gleason, with Saul Rubinek, Gretchen Egolf, Terry Farrell, Danny Wells, Kevin Dunn, Kristen Dalton, and Michael Chieffo in supporting roles. The film premiered on CBS on October 13, 2002.

== Plot ==
Framed by a late-career interview, reflecting on his success, Jackie Gleason discusses the origins of his nickname "The Great One," his dislike of rehearsals, his philosophy of comedy, and the popularity of The Honeymooners. Flashbacks depict his childhood in Brooklyn, where his father Herb's abandonment leaves him with lasting emotional scars, while his devoted mother, Mae, encourages his ambitions.

As a young comedian, Gleason pursues a career in nightclubs and begins a romance with Genevieve Halford. Inspired by Charlie Chaplin's creative independence, he becomes determined to control his own work. His rise through television leads to his breakthrough as the star of Cavalcade of Stars and later to national fame with The Honeymooners, where his improvisational style and larger-than-life personality make him one of television's biggest stars.

Success, however, comes at a personal cost. Gleason's ambition, perfectionism, and heavy drinking place increasing strain on his relationships. His marriage to Genevieve deteriorates and ultimately ends, after which he begins a relationship with Marilyn Taylor. Although Marilyn provides companionship during his later years, Gleason remains emotionally burdened by his childhood and struggles to balance his career with his personal life.

Gleason's insecurities also surface in his professional relationships. He clashes with his manager, George "Bullets" Durgom, and angrily confronts fellow comedian Sammy Birch after being accused of borrowing jokes. Despite his public confidence, Gleason admits that his father's rejection continued to affect him throughout his life, confessing that he spent years believing he was somehow responsible for being abandoned.

In the interview segments, Gleason expresses mixed feelings about ending The Honeymooners after one season, believing he may have preserved its legacy by leaving at its peak, while regretting that his relentless pursuit of success kept him from being more present for his family. The film concludes with the interviewer asking whether he truly is "The Great One." Gleason sidesteps the question with a joke, inviting the interviewer to play a game of pool and decide for himself, ending the film on a characteristic note of humor.

== Cast ==
- Brad Garrett as Jackie Gleason
  - Jake Brockman as young Jackie Gleason
- Saul Rubinek as George "Bullets" Durgom
- Gretchen Egolf as Genevieve Halford
- Kristen Dalton as Audrey Meadows
- Michael Chieffo as Art Carney
- Danny Wells as Jack L. Warner
- Mark Camacho as Sammy Birch
- Jason Blicker as Sol Friedman
- Vlasta Vrána as Toots Shor
- Shawn Lawrence as William S. Paley
- Kevin Dunn as Jack Philbin
- Terry Farrell as Marilyn Taylor
- Johanna Nutter as Joyce Randolph
- Lisa Bronwyn Moore as Pert Kelton
- Paula Jean Hixson as Mae Gleason
- Jack Langedijk as Herb Gleason

== Production ==
Back in 1997, Garrett was set to portray Gleason in a television biopic for CBS, with the script written by Everybody Loves Raymond creator Philip Rosenthal, but it never came to fruition.

When he learned that CBS acquired the rights to Gleason's life story, Garrett personally lobbied to the network to portray the role. Initially, CBS offered the part of Gleason to Mark Addy. However, Addy dropped out due to scheduling conflicts, thus Garrett was officially cast as Gleason.

Garrett reportedly disapproved of the script written by Rick Podell and Michael Preminger. With assistance from Deutch, Garrett and his writer friend Dave Boone wrote an uncredited rewrite of the script.

Garrett and Deutch paid Greg Cannom with their own money for him to apply for the makeup needed for Garrett to look like Gleason. It took Garrett three hours to put on the makeup and an hour and a half to take it off.

Unlike Gleason, who was 5 feet 11 in real life, Garrett was 6 feet 8 at the time of filming; in order for Garrett to appear as if he were 5 feet 11, the other cast members wore boots with seven-inch lifts and the doorways on the set were built at 8 feet rather than the usual 6 feet 9.

The film was shot in Montreal.

== Accolades ==
For his performance, Garrett was nominated for both the Primetime Emmy Award for Outstanding Lead Actor in a Limited Series or Movie and the Screen Actors Guild Award for Outstanding Performance by a Male Actor in a Miniseries or Television Movie. Deutch was nominated for the Directors Guild of America Award for Outstanding Directing – Miniseries or TV Film.
