= More Lies About Jerzy =

More Lies About Jerzy is a play written by Davey Holmes, inspired by the last days of the Polish-American novelist, Jerzy Kosiński.

It was first produced Off-Broadway in 2001, at the Vineyard Theatre in New York City. It premiered in London at the New End Theatre and in Los Angeles at the Hayworth Theatre. The play is published by Broadway Play Publishing Inc.

== Synopsis ==
A world-famous Jewish writer, Jerzy Lesnewski, is suspected as having lied about his childhood during the Holocaust.

== New York reviews ==
In its first run, the play received both positive and mixed reviews. In The New York Times, Bruce Weber wrote: "It is a work of admirable ambition and, indeed, perhaps its chief flaw is that it feels bulky and overloaded." In the New York Post, Clive Barnes called it “electrifying" and "completely engrossing,” and Donald Lyons, also in the Post, wrote that it was “exciting, compelling theater, about something that matters,” and "a meditation, serious but entertaining, on the ways people invent themselves.” Gordon Cox's review in Newsday called the play "a smart, complicated look at a self-made celebrity,” but that "it's too bad that Holmes felt compelled to include the truth about Jerzy in "More Lies About Jerzy," because it's all those masterfully crafted lies that give his play such intelligence and texture.” The play was awarded "Critics Pick" by Time Out New York.

Referring to the play in an interview with The New York Times, in 2001, Davey Holmes said, "I was always interested in people who invent themselves: celebrities, politicians, salesmen, actors. People who have... the choice of whether to rename themselves or not, to manufacture how they behave or are perceived."

== Los Angeles reviews ==
The reviews for the Los Angeles production were mainly raves, selected as "Critic's Choice" by the Los Angeles Times, LA Weekly and Backstage. The production was "Ovation Recommended" by the LA Stage Alliance Ovation Awards. Jack Stehlin's performance in the lead role was nominated for Best Actor by the Los Angeles Times.

== Casts ==
Original New York cast; Vineyard Theatre, 2001; directed by Darko Tresnjak

- Jared Harris as Jerzy Lesnewski
- Gretchen Egolf
- Daniel London
- Lizbeth MacKay
- Boris McGiver
- Betty Miller
- Portia Reiners
- Martin Shakar
- Adam Stein
- Gary Wilmes

Original London cast; 2002; New End Theatre

- George Layton as Jerzy Lesnewski

Original Los Angeles Cast; 2010; Circus Theatricals at the Hayworth Theatre; 2010; directed by David Trainer; produced by Jeannine Wisnosky Stehlin

- Jack Stehlin as Jerzy Lesnewski
- Kristin Malko as Georgia Fischer
- Cameron Meyer as Isabel Parris
- Adam Stein as Arthur Bausley
- Jordan Lund as Rysiek Zrupina
- Neil Vipond as Harry Frott
- Chet Grissom as Brett Pearson

== Publication ==
More Lies About Jerzy is published by Broadway Play Publishing Inc. in the collection Plays from The Vineyard Theater.
