= Bus 174 hijacking =

2000 bus hijacking in Brazil

- Location: In front of Parque Lage, Jardim Botânico, Rio de Janeiro, Rio de Janeiro, Brazil
- Date: 12 June 2000; 14:30 (UTC−3)
- Target: Line 174 bus (currently 105 - Troncal 5)
- Attack type: Hijacking; hostage-taking
- Weapons: Sandro: .38 caliber revolver; BOPE officer: 9mm H&K MP5
- Deaths: 2 (including the perpetrator)
- Injuries: 0
- Victim: Geísa Firmo Gonçalves
- Perpetrator: Sandro Barbosa do Nascimento
- Defender: BOPE

On 12 June 2000, a bus was hijacked at gun-point by Sandro Barbosa do Nascimento in Jardim Botânico, Rio de Janeiro, Rio de Janeiro, Brazil and hostages were held for 5 hours.

== Hijacking ==
On Pentecost Monday, 12 June 2000, Nascimento boarded a public bus, line number 174 in Jardim Botânico, Rio de Janeiro. He carried a .38 caliber revolver and intended to rob the passengers. Moments after he announced the robbery, a passenger gestured to a passing Rio de Janeiro military police vehicle, prompting the officers to intercept the bus.

Nascimento took the passengers hostage, and the bus was soon surrounded by police, television crews and onlookers. At first, Nascimento said he did not intend to kill anyone, and demanded weapons and a driver, as the driver had escaped through a window. As his demands were rejected, he threatened to kill a hostage by 6 p.m.

Nascimento singled out several hostages for dramatic threats, repeatedly using them as human shields. At about 7 p.m., he fired his revolver at the ground near Janaína Lopes Neves, who was on the floor, pretending to shoot her. He had previously told the other hostages to react as though she had been fatally shot.

Shortly afterwards, Nascimento exited the bus, using schoolteacher Geisa Firmo Gonçalves as a human shield. As he looked away, a BOPE officer with a submachine gun approached him from behind. Just prior to the officer reaching him, Nascimento turned directly toward the officer and reacted by jerking away from the officer and falling to the ground, taking Gonçalves with him. The officer reacted by continuing his advance and firing two or three shots at Nascimento while doing so. The first shot struck Gonçalves in the face; none of the other shots hit anyone. Nascimento fired three shots at Gonçalves, killing her. Officers converged on Nascimento and Gonçalves as they lay on the ground. Surrounding crowds rushed the area, with some intending to lynch the perpetrator. Nascimento was immobilized and taken into police custody.

After being taken into custody, Nascimento died of asphyxiation. The officers who took him were charged with murder but were found not guilty after a jury trial. There were rumors said Nascimento was intentionally killed by police in retaliation for the public nature of the hostage event.

Gonçalves was shot four times. Police reports said she was shot once in the face by the advancing police officer and then three times in the back by Nascimento in the ensuing struggle. The officer's shot was ruled unintentional by a court.

== Perpetrator ==
Sandro Barbosa do Nascimento (7 July 1978 – 12 June 2000) was the perpetrator of the Bus 174 hostage crisis in Jardim Botânico, Rio de Janeiro, Brazil. He boarded the bus with the intent to rob the passengers but the incident turned into a hostage situation broadcast live by most Brazilian national television channels.

According to Nascimento's relatives, he witnessed the murder of his mother. Shortly after the incident, he ran away from his home and lived on the streets.

At one point, Nascimento resided near Candelaria, a historical church in Rio de Janeiro, where he witnessed the Candelária church massacre, in which Brazilian police killed eight minors and injured several others, on 23 July 1993. Nascimento was unharmed but cited the event as a reason for taking hostages on the bus.

== Bus route number ==
The number "174" was used to identify a specific bus route between Central do Brasil and Gávea. Due to the stigma of the incident, the route number was changed to "158" in November 2001, then to "143", and in February 2016 to "Troncal 5".

== Films ==
At least two films have been made depicting the events of the hostage crisis.

The documentary Bus 174 (2002) retells the incident, discussing the life of Nascimento, and speculates on the social factors that led him to actions. The film uses a large amount of original video footage of the event, and recounts it from the perspective of several people, including hostages, the family of the perpetrator, police, and news reporters.

Última Parada 174 (2008) is a fictionalized account of the life of Nascimento. On September 16, 2008, the film was chosen by the Ministry of Culture as the representative of Brazil in the Oscar competition for best foreign film at the ceremony in 2009.

== See also ==
- List of hostage crises
- Manila hostage crisis
- Lutsk hostage crisis
