= The Two Mr. Kissels =

- Written by: Maria Nation
- Directed by: Ed Bianchi
- Starring: John Stamos; Anson Mount; Robin Tunney; Gretchen Egolf
- Music by: Reinhold Heil; Johnny Klimek
- Country of origin: United States
- Original language: English

Production
- Executive producer: Dan Wigutow
- Producers: Terry Gould; John Stamos
- Cinematography: Teodoro Maniaci
- Editor: David Ray
- Running time: 86 minutes
- Production companies: Dan Wigutow Productions; Lifetime Network

Original release
- Network: Lifetime
- Release: December 11, 2006

The Two Mr. Kissels is a 2008 American made-for-television true crime drama film directed by Ed Bianchi and starring John Stamos, Anson Mount, Gretchen Egolf and Robin Tunney. It chronicles the lives and murders of brothers Robert and Andrew Kissel. It originally premiered on Lifetime on November 15, 2008.

== Plot ==
The film starts with the murder of narrator Andrew Kissel (John Stamos), and is told through a series of flashbacks and documentary interviews, telling the story of how embezzling real estate mogul Andrew and his younger Wall Street broker brother, Robert (Anson Mount) meet their untimely ends. The two men compete for the affection of their disapproving father, and try to one-up each other with Robert marrying social climber Nancy (Robin Tunney) and having three children, while Andrew marries TV news analyst Haley (Gretchen Egolf). Nancy starts having an affair and kills her husband in Hong Kong, while Andrew starts doing drugs. Nancy is convicted for Robert's murder and sentenced to life in a Hong Kong women's prison, while Andrew's driver Juan Castillo is arrested for Andrew's murder. Nancy and Robert's daughters are in the custody of his sister, while Haley starts using her maiden name and returns to work.

== Cast ==
- John Stamos as Andrew Kissel
- Anson Mount as Robert Kissel
- Robin Tunney as Nancy Kissel
- Gretchen Egolf as Haley Kissel
- Chuck Shamata as Bill Kissel
- Tea Jacobson as Deborah Kissel
- London Angelis as young Andrew Kissel
- John Fleming as young Robert Kissel
- Elizabeth Hart as young Deborah Kissel
- Carlos Gonzalez-Vio as Juan Castillo
