= Candelária massacre =

1993 mass killing in Rio de Janeiro, Brazil

Coordinates: 22.9009°S 43.1778°W

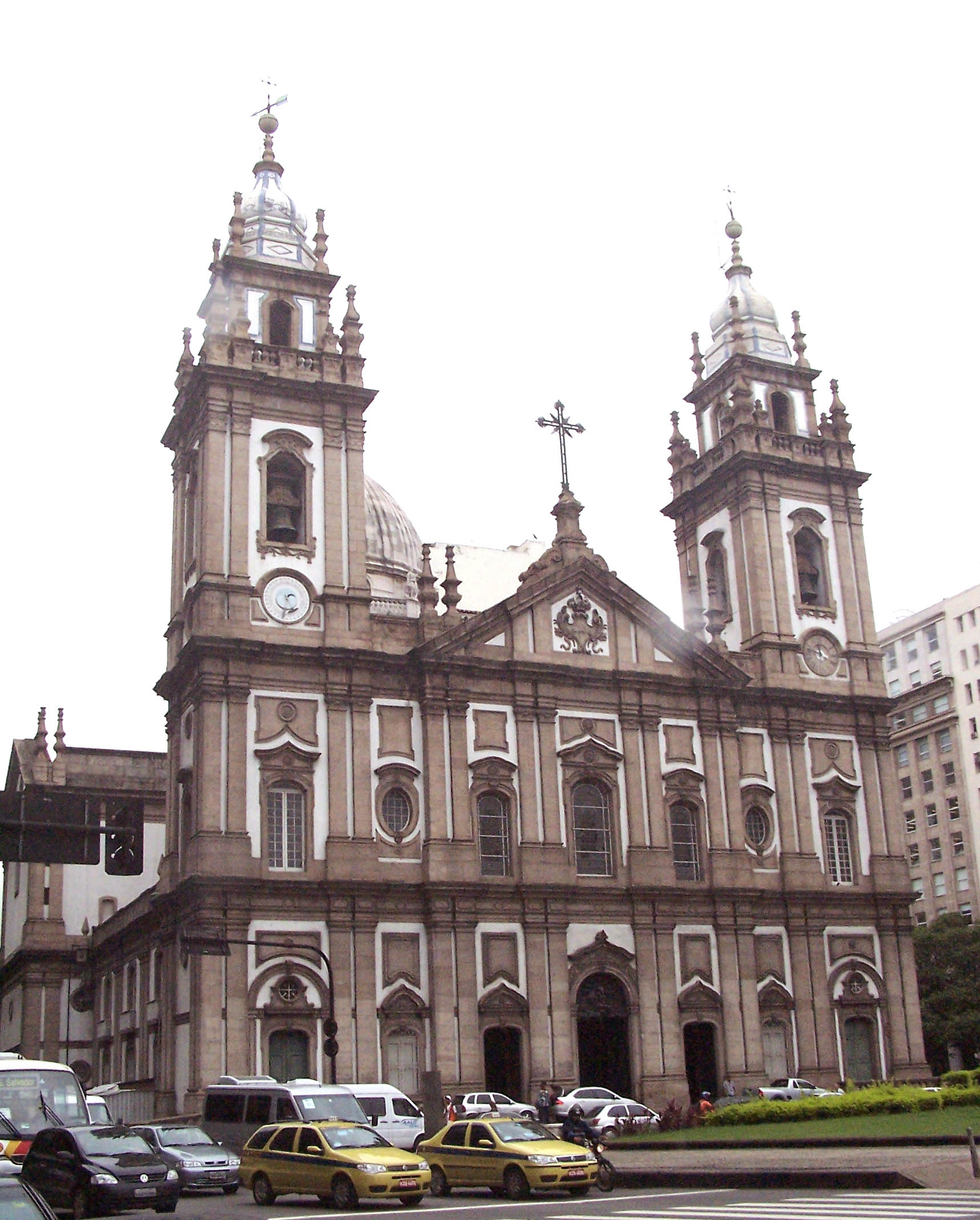
Candelária Church in Rio de Janeiro, the site of the massacre

The Candelária massacre (Portuguese: chacina da Candelária [ʃɐˈsĩnɐ ðɐ kɐ̃deˈlaɾjɐ]) was a mass killing in Rio de Janeiro, Brazil, on July 23, 1993. During the night, eight homeless people, including six minors, were killed by a group of men beside the Candelária Church. Several of the men were members of the police and were tried for the killings, but only two were convicted.

== Background ==
The Candelária Church is a famous historic Roman Catholic church in central Rio de Janeiro, Brazil. The church itself and the buildings around it in Pius X Square became known as a popular location for possibly hundreds of Rio de Janeiro's street children to form a makeshift home at night. The church's personnel provides food, shelter, education and religious advice to as many of these children as possible. Many of the homeless children are involved with the illegal drug trade and prostitution, and because many of these children also live around the church during the day, police keep a constant watch on the church's surroundings. In the early 1990s, the area around the Candelária Church developed a high crime rate as street children increasingly began to commit criminal activities such as pickpocketing and robbery.

== Massacre ==
Site where the massacre occurred.

According to survivors, on the morning of July 22, 1993, the day before the massacre, a group of children threw stones at police cars. As the children from the Candelária Church area were usually only given warnings by policemen, the young perpetrators left without worrying too much about the threat. At midnight, several Chevrolet Chevette cars with covered license plates came to a halt in front of the Candelária Church, and the occupants began shooting at the group of roughly seventy street children sleeping in the vicinity of the church.

Subsequently, in the investigations, it was found that the shots were fired by militiamen, that used the square around the church as a selling point for drugs. As a result, six children and teenagers died and several other children and teenagers got injured.

=== List of fatal victims ===
The names of the eight victims are inscribed in a wooden cross, erected in the garden across the church:

- Paulo Roberto de Oliveira, 11 years old
- Anderson de Oliveira Pereira, 13 years old
- Marcelo Cândido de Jesus, 14 years old
- Valdevino Miguel de Almeida, 14 years old
- "Gambazinho", 17 years old
- Leandro Santos da Conceição, 17 years old
- Paulo José da Silva, 18 years old
- Marcos Antônio Alves da Silva, 19 years old

== Aftermath ==
The investigation led the police to Wagner dos Santos, one of the teenagers that survived, even though he was hit four times. Santos would suffer a second attack on September 12, 1994, in the Central do Brasil and from then on, the Prosecutor's Office put him on the Witness Protection Program. His testimony was fundamental in the recognition of those involved. Wagner left the country with the help of the federal government and suffers from serious health problems.

During the case, seven people were indicted: the former military police officer Marcus Vinícius Emmanuel Borges, the Military Policemen Cláudio dos Santos and Marcelo Cortes, the locksmith Jurandir Gomes França, Nelson Oliveiras dos Santos, Marco Aurélio Dias de Alcântara and Arlindo Afonso Lisboa Júnior.

- Cláudio, Marcelo and Jurandir were acquitted.
- Arlindo hasn't been tried for the mass killing, having been sentenced to two years for having possession of one of the crime weapons.
- The other three, already convicted, remain free, benefited by pardon or parole.
- Marcus Vinicius Emmanuel Borges, a former military police officer - was sentenced to 309 years. He appealed the sentence and, in a second trial, was sentenced to 89 years. Unsatisfied with the result, the Prosecutor's Office asked for a new trial and, in February 2003, Emmanuel was sentenced to 300 years but remains free;
- Nelson Oliveira dos Santos - was sentenced to 243 years in prison for the killings and 18 years for attempted murder Wagner dos Santos. He appealed his sentence, being absolved for the killings even after confessing to the crime. The Prosecutor's Office appealed and, in the year 2000, Nelson was sentenced to 27 years for the killings and the attempted murder charge was kept, adding up to 45 years. Nelson Oliveira dos Santos was initially released but is currently on parole for other crimes, according to the Justice Court of Rio;
- Marco Aurélio Dias de Alcântara - was sentenced to 204 years in prison and was also released from jail.

The international community severely condemned the attack, and many in Brazil asked for the prosecution of those who shot the Candelária Church children.

== Memory and survivors ==
According to studies conducted by associations connected to the Amnesty International, forty four of the seventy children that slept in the streets of that region lost their lives in a violent manner. The majority of the young victims were poor and black.

In 2023, 30 years after the massacre, the majority of the survivors had already died or were missing, most famously Sandro Barbosa do Nascimento, that in 2000 orchestrated the bus 174 hijacking and was killed by police; and Elizabeth Cristina de Oliveira Maia, known then as "Beth Gorda" ("Fat Beth") and one of the leaders of the group of young people that lived in the vicinity of the Candelária Church, that was killed in 2000 by drug dealers, according to the Rio de Janeiro police.

Wagner dos Santos, that had been shot in the Aterro do Flamengo four hours before the massacre, had the role of key-witness in the case. While he recovered in the hospital, Wagner was victim of a second attack, out of the four he suffered after the massacre. Cristina Leonardo, at the time assistant of human rights, helped Wagner and other survivors, and helped him get in the Witness Protection Program.

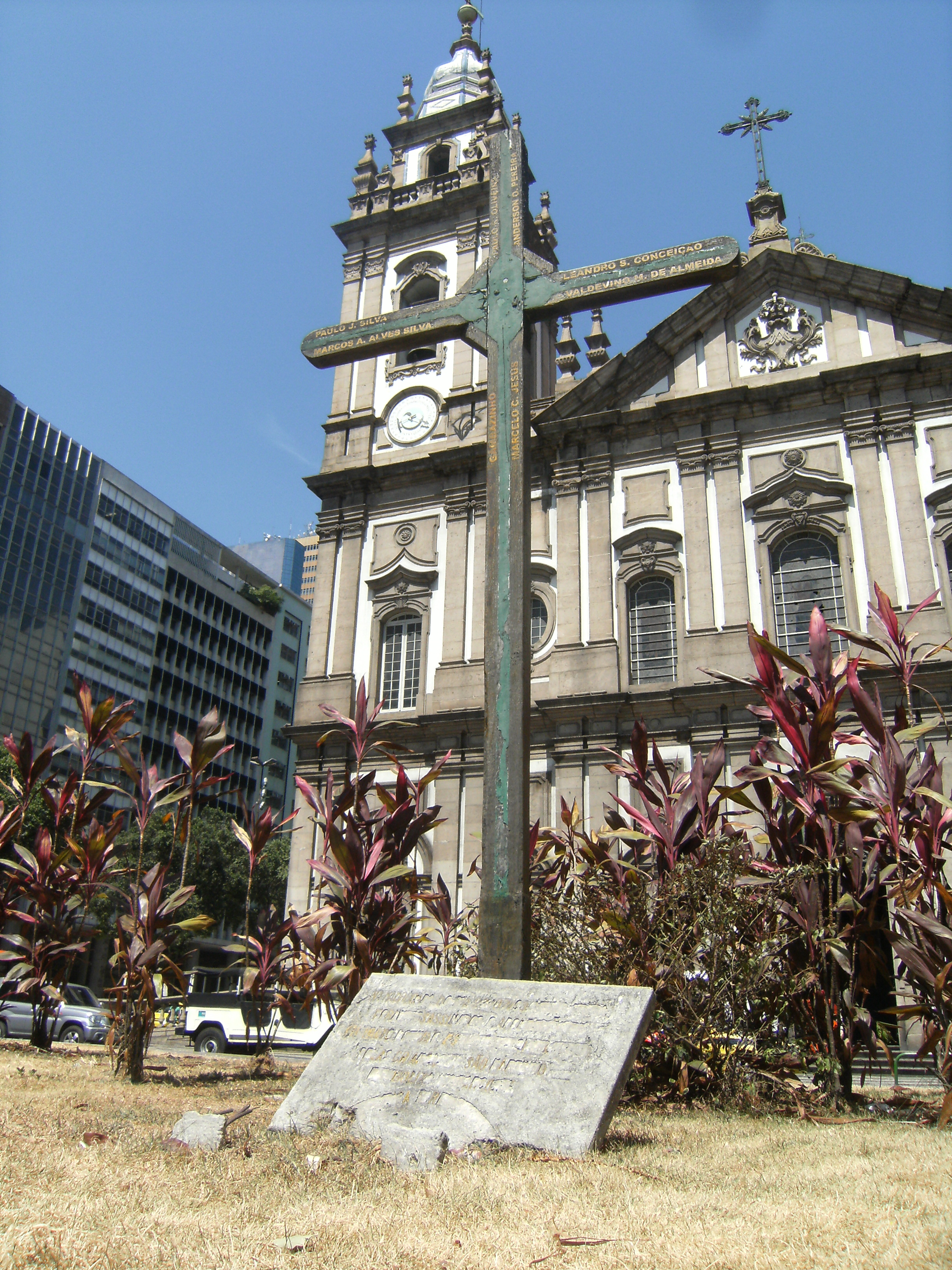
The monument with the church in the back.

=== Monument ===
In front of the church there is a small monument in remembrance of the massacre. It is constituted of a wooden cross, that is inscribed with the names of the victims, and a concrete plate. It has suffered apparent actions of vandalism since it is somewhat damaged and dismembered from its stand and with its epigraph illegible.

Meanwhile, for the 30th anniversary of the massacre, the Rio de Janeiro City Hall renovated the cross and coated the base with granite. The stand and the plate with the information have also been improved.

=== Cultural references ===
The massacre was portrayed in an episode of the show Linha Direta of Rede Globo. The event was addressed by the Brazilian death metal band Lacerated and Carbonized in the song "The Candelária Massacre" from their 2013 album The Core of Disruption. Blaggers ITA did the same in their 1993 single "Oxygen" It is also portrayed, in a flashback, by the protagonist of the book O Imperador da Ursa Maior by Carlos Eduardo Novaes. The documentary Bus 174 by José Padilha and the movie Last Stop 174 by Bruno Barreto, both narrate the history of Sandro Barbosa do Nascimento, one of the massacre's survivors that, seven years later, was the protagonist of the bus 174 hijacking in the same city. A reference to the massacre is also in the game Metal Gear Rising: Revengeance. In a CODEC conversation, during the ARCHIVE R-02, Kevin and the protagonist Raiden talk about homeless children and mention the massacre. The massacre is fictionalized in the 2024 four-part Netflix series “Children of the Church Steps”, which received mostly favorable reviews.

== See also ==
- List of massacres in Brazil
