= Murder of Robert Kissel =

2003 murder in Hong Kong

The Nancy Kissel murder case (officially called Hong Kong v Nancy Ann Kissel) was a highly publicised criminal trial held in the High Court of Hong Kong, where American expatriate Nancy Ann Kissel (née Keeshin) was convicted of the murder of her husband, 40-year-old investment banker Robert Peter Kissel, in their apartment on 2 November 2003. It was arguably the highest profile criminal case involving an expatriate in Hong Kong's history, and was closely covered in the media. Kissel was convicted of murder in 2005 and received a mandatory life sentence. The Court of Final Appeal overturned the conviction in February 2010, citing legal errors, and ordered a retrial. At the conclusion of the retrial on 25 March 2011, Kissel was again found guilty of her husband's murder and sentenced to life in prison. She is serving her sentence at Tai Lam Centre for Women. Coincidentally his brother, Andrew, a former American real estate developer, was murdered on 3 April 2006 in Greenwich, Connecticut, United States.

== Murder ==
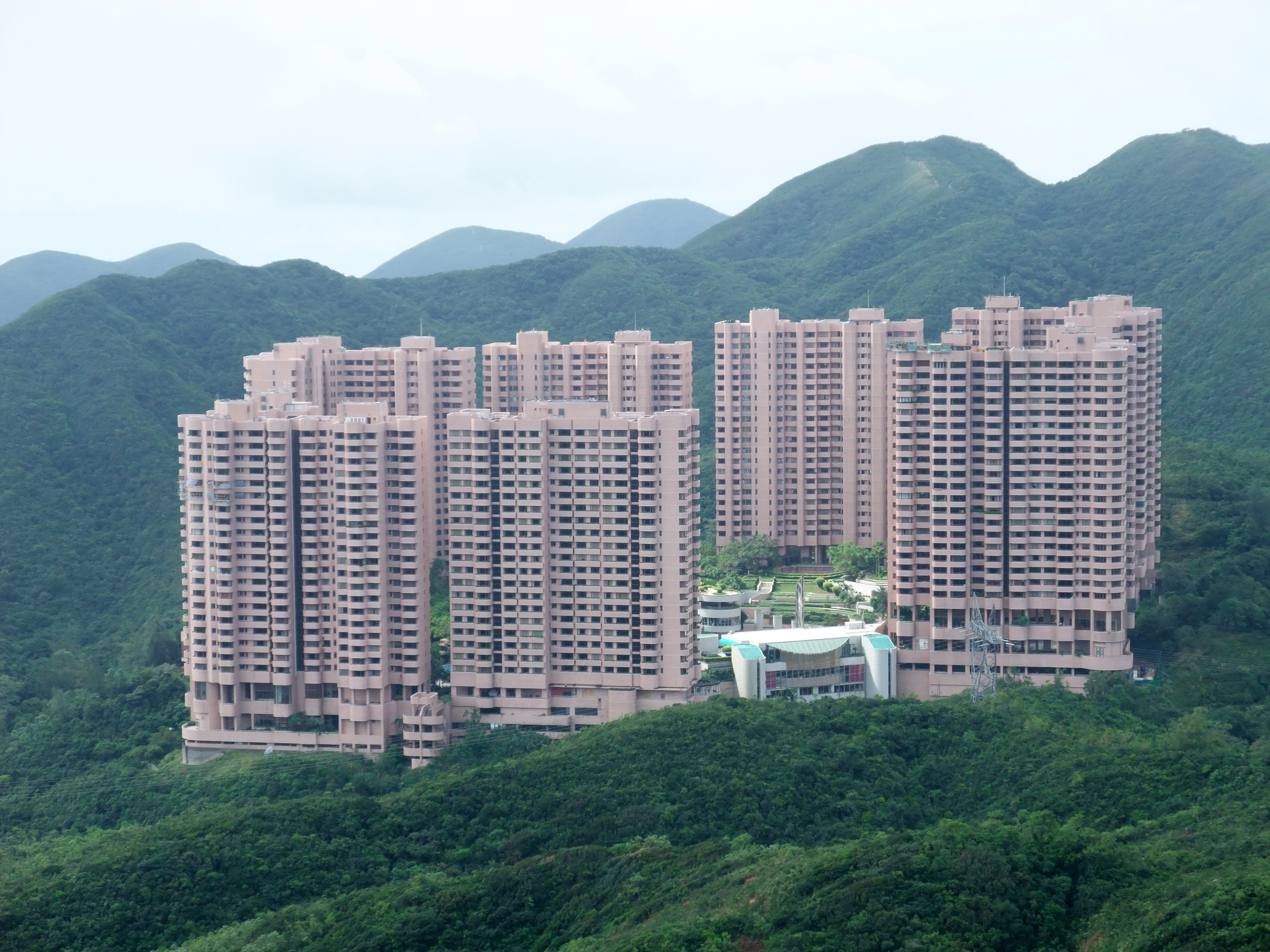
Hong Kong Parkview, where the murder took place

On a return trip to the U.S. in mid-2003, Nancy Kissel met and had an affair with Michael Del Priore, a twice-married electrical repairman who had rewired the Kissel home in Vermont. Robert Kissel became suspicious of his wife's infidelity and had hired a private detective, Frank Shea, to spy on her. Robert also secretly installed the spyware eBlaster on Nancy's computer. Nancy claimed that her husband had initiated proceedings for divorce and securing custody of their children.

Nancy drugged Robert by having their six-year-old daughter give him a strawberry milkshake laced with a cocktail of sedatives. When the drugs had taken effect and the children were out of the apartment, Nancy bludgeoned her husband to death. She then rolled up his body in a carpet and had it placed in their storeroom in the Parkview apartment complex.

After her arrest, Nancy admitted to killing Robert, but said it was in self-defense. She claimed that she was the victim of domestic violence – including repeated acts of rape and sodomy – over a five-year period. She further asserted that Robert habitually abused alcohol and cocaine.

The trial began in June 2005 at the High Court, with the prosecution alleging that Nancy murdered her husband; she pleaded not guilty. Nancy admitted under cross-examination that she had bludgeoned her husband to death, but maintained that she was defending herself and further claimed memory loss, testifying she had no knowledge of how she inflicted five head wounds with a heavy metal sculpture.

Nancy admitted to using Stilnox, one of the sedatives found in her husband's body, to doctor a bottle of malt whisky when they were living in Vermont in the hope that it would make her husband less aggressive toward their children, but testified it had had no effect on him. Regardless of that, Nancy admitted to trying the same thing in Hong Kong, but testified that when she saw the sediment it left at the bottom of the bottle, she poured out the drugged liquor, bought a new bottle and used it to partially fill up the old one, and then "never thought about it again". The Kissels' neighbor, Andrew Tanzer, testified he had become drowsy and then unconscious after sampling the milkshake. Nancy admitted making it for one of her children and a visiting child, but denied drugging it, stating she would never harm her children or anyone else's.

== Trial and verdict ==
The case against Nancy Kissel was brought before Justice Michael Lunn. At the end of the trial, lasting 65 days, on 1 September 2005 the jury of five men and two women unanimously decided on her guilt after eight hours of deliberation. She was sentenced to life in prison.

Kissel appealed her conviction in April 2008. That petition was rejected. She then lodged an appeal with the Court of Final Appeal on 12 January 2010. The case was heard before a five-judge panel led by then-Chief Justice Andrew Li on 21 January. The defense argued that the prosecution had improperly used evidence, including hearsay, and that the original jury instructions were problematic. On 11 February 2010, the Court of Final Appeal quashed the conviction and ordered a retrial, citing prosecution use of inadmissible evidence. Kissel was permitted to seek bail, but ultimately chose not to apply.

== Second indictment ==
Kissel was re-indicted on a single count of murder on 2 March 2010, with the retrial due to start on 10 January 2011.

According to the defense, Robert told his wife on the night of 2 November 2003, that he was filing for divorce and that she was unfit to care for their children. The defense also alleged she had long suffered from physical and sexual abuse. Nancy pleaded not guilty to murder, but guilty to manslaughter on the basis of diminished responsibility and provocation. She admitted to having an extramarital relationship with a TV repairman, and the prosecution alleged that she planned to run away with her lover in the U.S. after her husband's death, and that she stood to inherit her husband's estate worth US$18 million.

On 25 March 2011, after hearing evidence from over 50 prosecution and defense witnesses over ten weeks, the jury of seven women and two men unanimously found Kissel guilty as charged. She was sentenced to life imprisonment.

On 24 April 2014, the Court of Final Appeal refused to allow an appeal against the verdict of her 2011 retrial, rejecting the arguments of Kissel's lawyer, Edward Fitzgerald, that the prosecution was wrong to tell the retrial's jury that his client was not suffering any psychiatric illness and that the trial judge had erred in directing the jury.

"We are not persuaded that the two grounds submitted by the applicant are arguable," Justice Roberto Ribeiro said. He said that he and the court's two other judges, Justice Robert Tang Ching and Justice Joseph Fok, would hand down the reason for their decision later.

== Media ==
In 2003 the murder of Kissel was the subject of a non-fiction book by Joe McGinniss, Never Enough. It was also dramatized in the 2008 Lifetime television film The Two Mr. Kissels, with Robin Tunney playing Nancy Kissel and Anson Mount playing her husband Robert.
