= Adam Chodzko =

British artist

- Born: 1965 (age 60–61); London, England
- Education: University of Manchester; Goldsmiths College
- Known for: Conceptual art, installation art, contemporary art
- Movement: Young British Artists, Relational Art
- Website: https://www.adamchodzko.com/

Adam Chodzko (born 1965) is a contemporary British artist, exhibiting internationally. His practice uses a wide range of media, including video, installation, photography, drawing, and performance.

== Early life and education ==
Adam Chodzko was born in London, England. He graduated from the University of Manchester in 1988 with a degree in the History of Art and in 1994 completed an MA in Fine Art at Goldsmiths College, London.

== Work ==
Chodzko's artworks explore the interactions and possibilities of human behaviour "in the gap between how we are and how we could be."

Exhibiting work since 1991, working across media, from video installation to subtle interventions, and with a practice that is situated both within the gallery and the wider public realm, Chodzko's work explores the idea of collective imagination, investigating how the visual might catalyse new forms of engagement between people. His art proposes new relationships between our value and belief systems, examining their effect on our communal and private spaces and working with the documents and fictions that control, describe and guide these systems and spaces. Working directly with the networks of people and places that surround him, often using forms of anthropology, he focuses on the relational politics of culture's edges, endings, displacements, transitions and disappearances through a provocative looking in the 'wrong' place. Chodzko's practice operates between documentary and fantasy (especially in the form of "science fiction", using art to propose alternative realities), conceptualism and surrealism and public and private space, often engaging reflexively and directly with the role of the viewer.

Examples of Chodzko's socially-engaged artworks include Product Recall (1994, posters, advertisements and video installation), using the process of a product recall to assemble owners of a particular jacket made ten years earlier; Salò:Reunion (1998, posters, advertisements, photographs and video installation made through organising the reunion of the children 'murdered' in Salò (1972), Pasolini's notorious film); The god Look-Alike Contest (1992, a mixed media installation created through responses to an advertisement in a classified advertisements paper); and cell-a (2002, a slide projection and event, initiated through giving a London gallery's archive to a group of Kurdish asylum seekers to edit and mediate outside the capital).

Chodzko's development of these ideas and processes later became consolidated into a body of work collectively titled Design for a Carnival (c. 2001–2007). This includes works such as Plan for a Spell (2001, a video exploring ritual within the British landscape through programming its image, subtitles and audio to randomly combine in order to release a potential 'spell' embedded within it); Settlement (2004, the legal purchase of a square foot of land as a gift to a stranger), Nightshift (2004, the tracking of a late night parade of nocturnal animals to the Frieze Art Fair, mapped, to provide animal paths through the fair's 'labyrinth' for human visitors to follow) and M-path (2006, the collection and distribution of "appropriate" footwear for gallery visitors to wear, altering their movement through the gallery space, and therefore their perception of it).

A trilogy of video installations, Hole (2007, at Bologna Museum of Modern Art), Around (2007, based in Dublin and partly set in Ballymun) and Pyramid (2008, commissioned for the Folkestone Triennial) developed a series of myths set in the near future and focused on the relationship between a community and its architectural ruins. Echo (2009, a video installation commissioned by Creative Time, New York), interweaves archive footage, documentary technique and conjecture to reveal that a derelict military ballroom on Governors Island, New York, was a site used for an anti-materialistic gift-exchange ritual invented by the children of the island's military.

Throughout these earlier works, and further explored in later works such as The Pickers (2009, the editing of a British film archive by a group of migrant Romanian strawberry pickers) and Ghost (2010, a kayak designed by Chodzko for "visiting the dead"), are investigations into processes of how memory, archiving, empathy, identification and the imaginary are shaped by the act of looking.

Because, (2013, at Tate Britain, as part of the exhibition Schwitters in Britain) and We are Ready for your Arrival (2013 at Raven Row, London) further develop these ideas through sculpture, video, drawing and photography, presented as manifestations of the unconscious relationships between individuals and groups; their excesses, displacements and disappearances. Invited by the Benaki Museum, Athens, to work with its collection Chodzko made You'll see; this time it will be different, (2013), an exhibition as retrospective, of 20 apparently 'old' posters advertising exhibitions (with themes ranging from: Jealous Animals to Unpopularity) of the Benaki collection, set in the future (2065–2078), and sited in often 'impossible,’ peripheral spaces, dispersed to the outskirts of Greece.

Place as a site which appears to exercise power and influence over the people who happen to occupy it is often explored through Chodzko's use of displacement, separating objects and images from their familiar and 'natural' time and situation in order to relocate them in the "wrong place" so that a change might be catalysed by that dislocation. A series of works entitled Better Scenery (2000–2002) sited pairs of mutually dependent billboard signs at various locations in the world giving travel directions to the location of the opposite sign. The Flasher works (1990-1996) were a series of one-minute videos, shot by Chodzko, documenting darkness being temporarily illuminated by marine distress-flares, with these sequences individually disseminated by adding them to the surplus tape following the credits of VHS feature films tapes rented from video rental-stores.

The theme of physically remote but intimate cross-cultural social networks, operating on both a conscious and unconscious (or even supernatural) level, has been a consistent theme in Chodzko's work, from the anticipation of digital social-networking communities in the Transmitter series (1990-) and The god Look-Alike Contest (1991) and more recently in the installation A Room for Laarni, Image Moderator (2013). This latter series of mixed-media works are based around the relationship and flow of images between a western European social-networking site (for teenagers) and an image moderator, based in the Philippines, whose job it is to monitor this flood of digital photographs, in order to flag up those whose contents might be deemed 'bad'.

Deep Above (2015) and Rising (2013) expose a process of 'making sense of imagery' in relation to our collective and individual responses to the threat of climate change. These works speculate that, inadvertently, a repurposing of ‘art thinking’ might be the only way of short-circuiting the psychological paralysis (caused by our brains’ hardwiring) so that we might take action in order to avert climate change, while Sleepers (2016) explores our empathic projection when encountering the imagery of the unconsciousness of others. Channel, Rupture, 2015 and Design for a Fold, 2015, both continue Chodzko's speculations about the effects of flows of empathy across time and space and between the local and the remote. Many of Chodzko’s works evolve through this sense of projecting outwards from the self into the perception of, not only other people, but also the inanimate through migratory embodiments with objects, rooms, places, institutions, images. Recent works have continued explorations into the relationships between place (particularly the idea of ‘the garden’), perception, identity, mythology, ritual, language, the body and the unconscious (e.g.; A Hostile Environment (2019), Fluid Dynamics; The Quail is Rising (2020), O, you happy roots, branch and mediatrix [live] (2020), Thru hole I blind/O/Thru hole oui see (2020)).

Although curated into many of the major Young British Artist exhibitions (e.g.; Sensation (art exhibition), and Brilliant!) of the 1990s (and in 2014, London Calling), Chodzko's practice - from his 1990 works with pre-internet social networks via classified advertisements - is more closely identifiable (through its notions of participation, process, intersubjectivity and community) with the Relational art that was to follow (partly in opposition to the dependency on spectacle that defined YBA art). Kevin Jackson, (1996) singled out Chodzko from the other YBA's for his art's "pensiveness", involving "quiet acts of infiltration...nothing to do with one-line shock effects." In 2013, Dan Fox, reappraising the diversity of British Art of the early 1990s, writes of Chodzko's work from this period as developing a "British occult modern... behavioural experiments to probe the public sphere.", whilst Jonathan Jones (journalist) described Chodzko as a "subversive...master of provocation" in The Guardian.

=== Exhibitions ===
Since 1991, Chodzko has exhibited at numerous venues around the world including Tate Britain; Tate St Ives; Venice Biennale; Royal Academy, London; Deste Foundation, Athens; PS1, NY; Ikon Gallery, Birmingham; Kunstmuseum Luzern; Henry Moore Institute, Leeds; Yorkshire Sculpture Park; Athens Biennale; Istanbul Biennial; Benaki Museum, Athens; and Folkestone Triennial.

His commissioners include Creative Time, NY; The Contemporary Art Society; Frieze Art Fair; Hayward Gallery and Film And Video Umbrella.

Chodzko has been included in many British Council curated international exhibitions of British Art including General Release (1995) in Venice, Micro/Macro: British Art 1996-2002,(2003), Mucsarnok Kunsthalle, Budapest, Breaking Step (2007), Museum of Contemporary Art in Belgrade, and Private Utopia (2014), Japan.

=== Awards ===
In 2002, Chodzko received awards from the Paul Hamlyn Foundation and the Foundation for Contemporary Arts Grants to Artists award, and in 2007 was awarded an AHRC Creative Research Fellowship in the Film Department at the University of Kent, Canterbury. In 2015 Chodzko was shortlisted for the Jarman Award. In 2016 Chodzko received an award from DACS ART360 in order to facilitate the comprehensive archiving of his artwork from 1990 to the present.

=== Collections ===
Chodzko's work is in the collections of the Tate; The British Council; The Arts Council; The British Film Institute; Artist Pension Trust; Auckland City Art Gallery; Contemporary Art Society; The Creative Foundation: Folkestone; Frac Languedoc-Rousillon; GAM - Galleria d’Arte Moderna, Turin; Grizedale Arts; LUX; Museo d’Arte Moderna di Bologna; Plains Art Museum, North Dakota; Saatchi Collection, South London Gallery; Towner Gallery, Eastbourne, Wellcome Collection and many international museums and private collections.

=== Teaching ===
Chodzko's involvement in teaching Fine Art at Higher Education and Further Education institutions, on B.A. and M.A. degree courses includes, in the UK; Central Saint Martins, Chelsea College of Arts, Slade School of Fine Art, Goldsmiths University of London, University for the Creative Arts, Sheffield Hallam University, Liverpool John Moores University, Ruskin College, Oxford and with young people at Open School East. In the US: Carnegie Mellon University, Rutgers University. In Canada: Banff Centre. From 2014-2018 Chodzko was Senior Lecturer in Fine Art at the University of Kent's School of Music and Fine Art, based at Chatham Dockyard.

He is on the Faculty of Fine Art for the British School at Rome.
