= Candelária Church =

Roman Catholic church in Rio de Janeiro, Brazil

- Igreja da Candelária
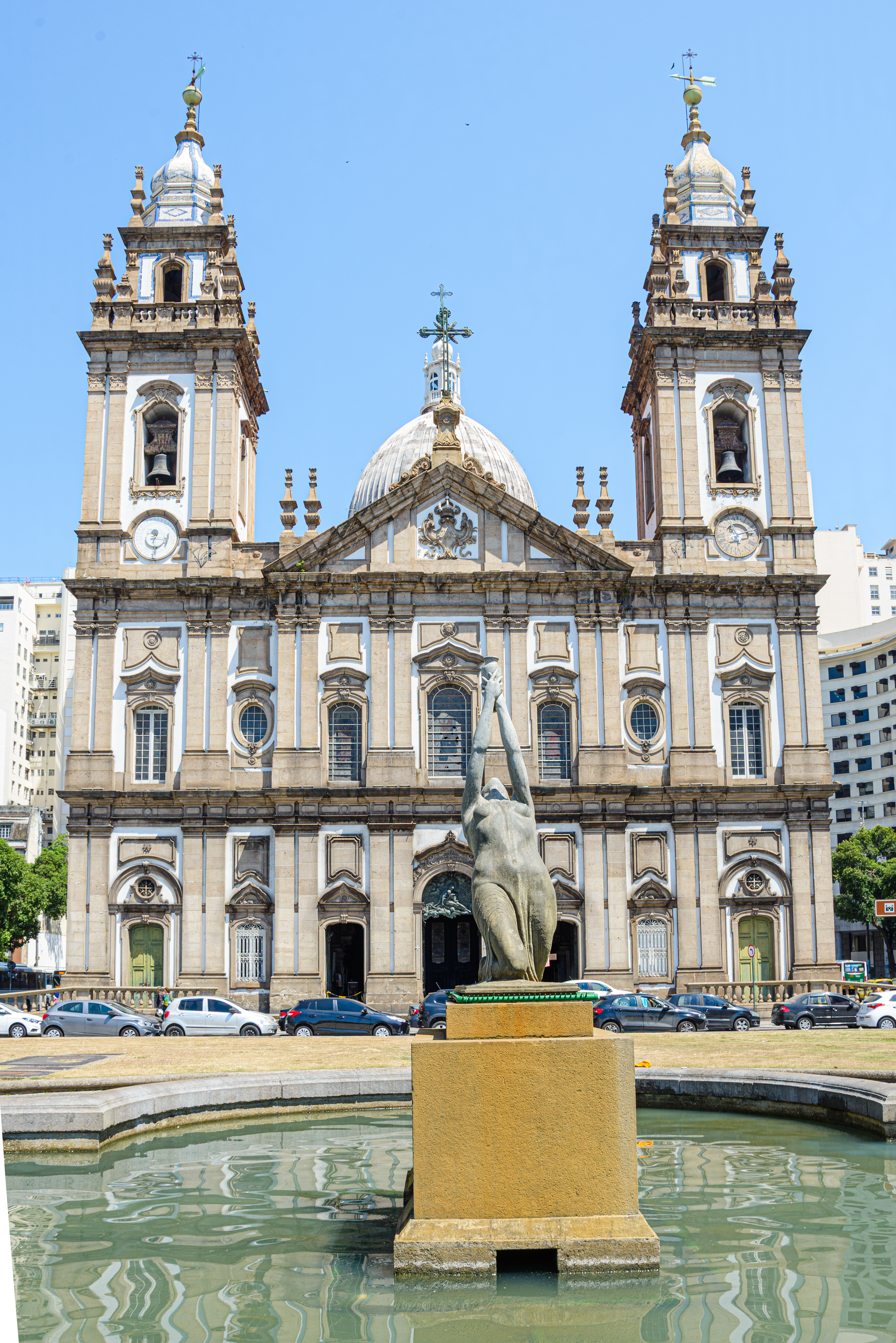
- Façade

- Location of the Candelária Church in Rio de Janeiro

Religion
- Affiliation: Catholic
- Rite: Roman Rite
- Status: Active

Location
- Municipality: Rio de Janeiro
- State: Rio de Janeiro
- Country: Brazil
- Coordinates: 22°54′03″S 43°10′40″W

National Historic Heritage of Brazil
- Designated: 1938
- Reference no.: 51

The Candelária Church (Portuguese: Igreja da Candelária, pronounced [iˈgɾeʒɐ ðɐ kɐ̃deˈlaɾjɐ]) is an important historical Roman Catholic church in the city of Rio de Janeiro, in southeastern Brazil. It was built and decorated during a long period, from 1775 to the late 19th century. The church combines a Portuguese colonial Baroque façade with later Neoclassical and Neo-Renaissance interior elements.

== History ==
The quasi-legendary history about the establishment of the church is that in the beginning of the 17th century a ship called Candelária almost sank during a storm on the sea. Upon arriving in Rio de Janeiro, a Portuguese couple, António Martins Palma and Leonor Gonçalves sponsored the building of a small chapel, fulfilling the oath they made during the storm. This small chapel, dedicated to Our Lady of Candelária, was built around 1609.

In the second half of the 18th century, as the ancient chapel was in need of repair, Portuguese military engineer Francisco João Roscio was put in charge of the project of a new, larger building. The works started in 1775 and the church – still unfinished – was inaugurated in 1811 in the presence of King John VI of Portugal, who at the time was in Rio with the whole Portuguese court. From this early period (1775–1811) the splendid main façade was built in Baroque style with neoclassical elements. The interior of the church was, however, greatly modified afterwards, as the floorplan was changed from a one-aisled to a three-aisled nave.

Enslaved people were baptised in the church, including Rosa Egipcíaca, the first black woman to write a book in Brazil. The book was a religious text revealing her visions, and was entitled Sagrada Teologia do Amor Divino das Almas Peregrinas.

Around 1856 the stone roofs of the aisles were completed, but the dome over the crossing was still unfinished. The dome would only be completed in 1877 after the intervention of several architects and much discussion and planning. The dome and its eight statues were made in white Lioz stone, in Lisbon, and brought to Brazil by ship. When finished, the dome of the Candelária was the tallest structure in the city.

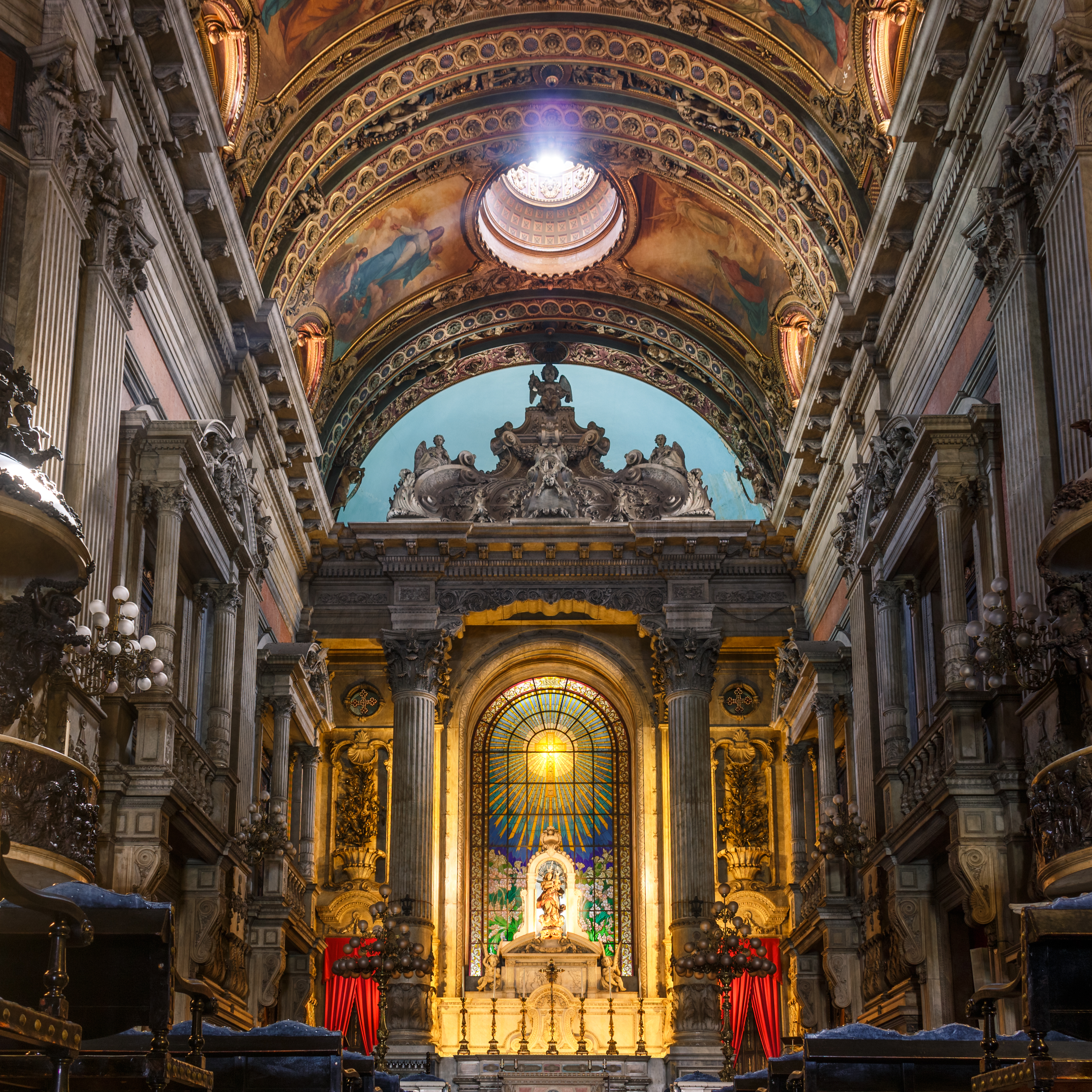
Interior view of the Candelária Church, towards the main chapel.

=== Interior ===
After 1878 the interior of the Candelária church started being redesigned, in the Neo-Renaissance style. The walls and columns were covered with Italian marble of various colours, and abundant sculptural relief decoration. Brazilian painter João Zeferino da Costa was commissioned to paint the nave and inner part of the dome. On the ceiling of the main aisle, Zeferino da Costa and his assistants painted six panels telling the history of the church.

Other elements of interest include: the main altar by Brazilian architect Archimedes Memória; the various German stained-glass windows; the bronze doors (c. 1901) of the main entrance, by Portuguese sculptor António Teixeira Lopes; and the two monumental bronze pulpits in the Art-Nouveau style, by Portuguese sculptor Rodolfo Pinto do Couto (1931).

== Architecture ==
The Candelária church is a Latin cross church with a dome over the transept. The nave has three aisles and a main chapel in the apse. The whole ensemble may have been inspired by the church at the Convent of Mafra, and in the Estrela Basílica of Lisbon, both in Portugal.

=== Façade ===
The main façade shows Baroque influences in the design of the windows, doors, and towers, as well as neoclassical influences in the bi-dimensionality of the façade and the triangular pediment. The façade contrasts the dark granite of windows, columns and other elements with whitewashed wall segments, a typical characteristic of colonial churches in Rio.

== Events ==
The church has been the site of several significant moments in the contemporary history of Brazil, such as the memorial mass of high school student Edson Luís de Lima Souto, and the Diretas Já campaign for popular direct presidential elections attended by over a million people in 1984.

The area around the church was the site of the Candelária massacre of July 23, 1993, which brought worldwide attention to the issue of police brutality toward street children in Brazil.

The official cauldron for the 2016 Summer Olympics was placed in a plaza outside the church.

== Gallery ==
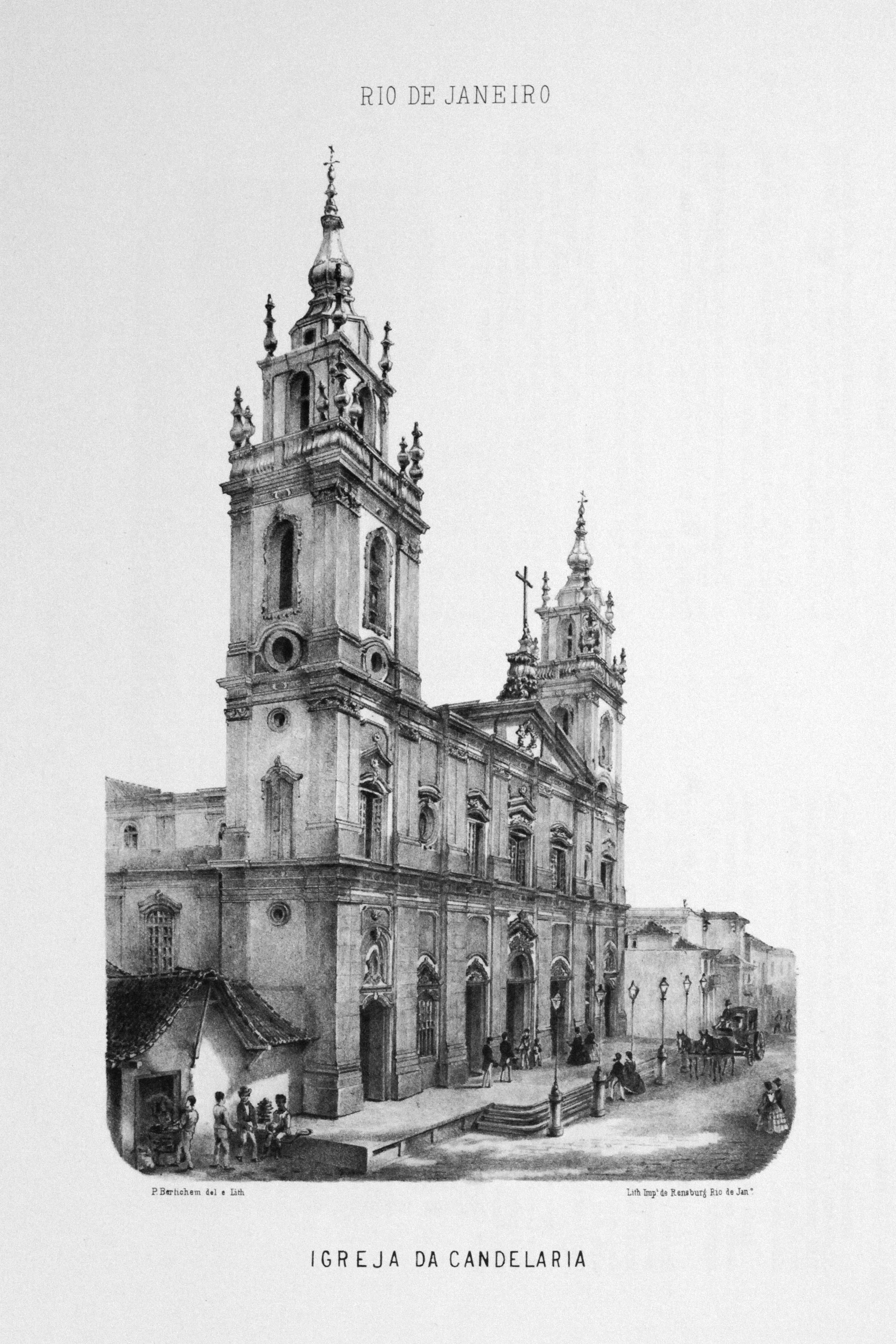
Candelária Church in 1856.

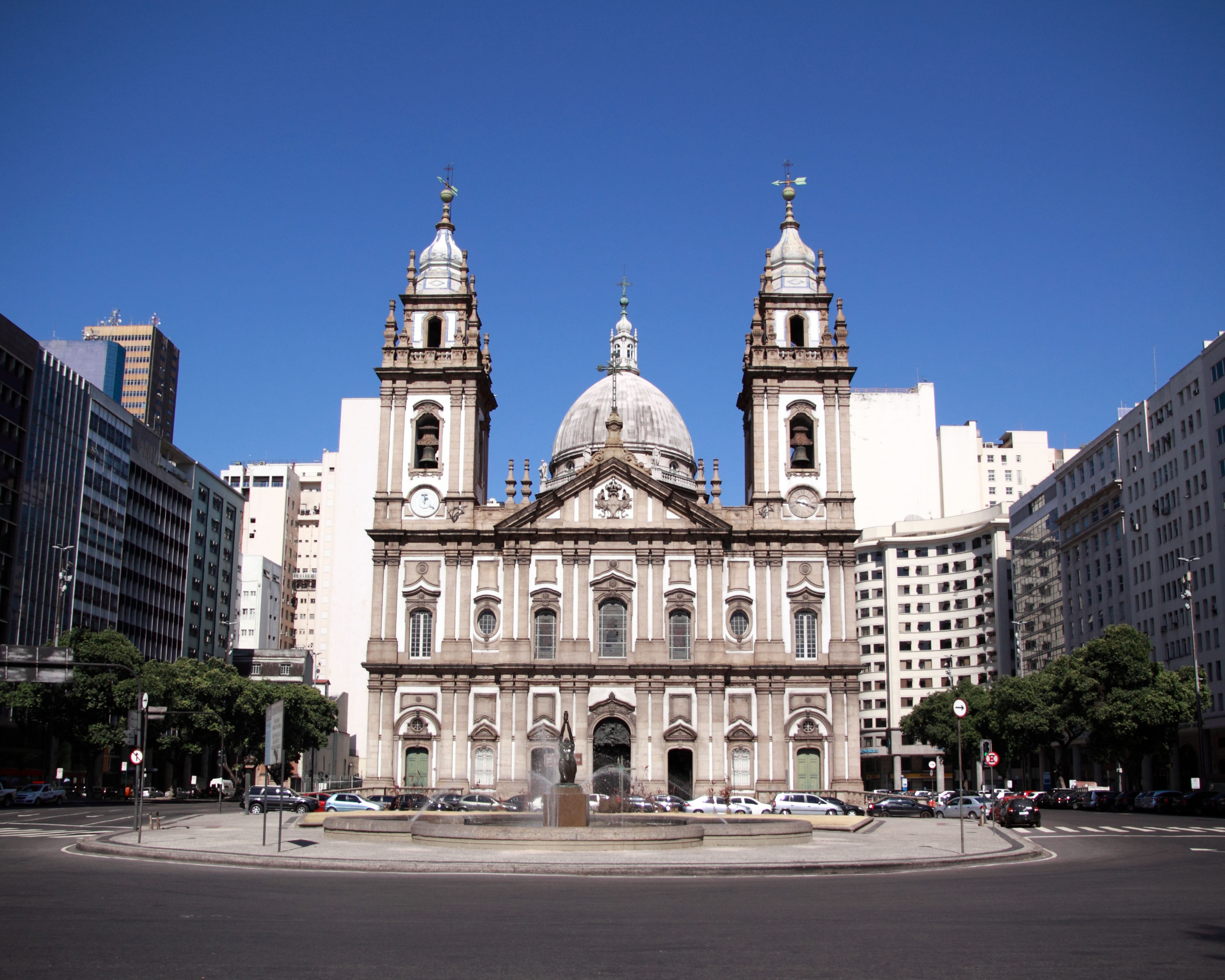
Facade

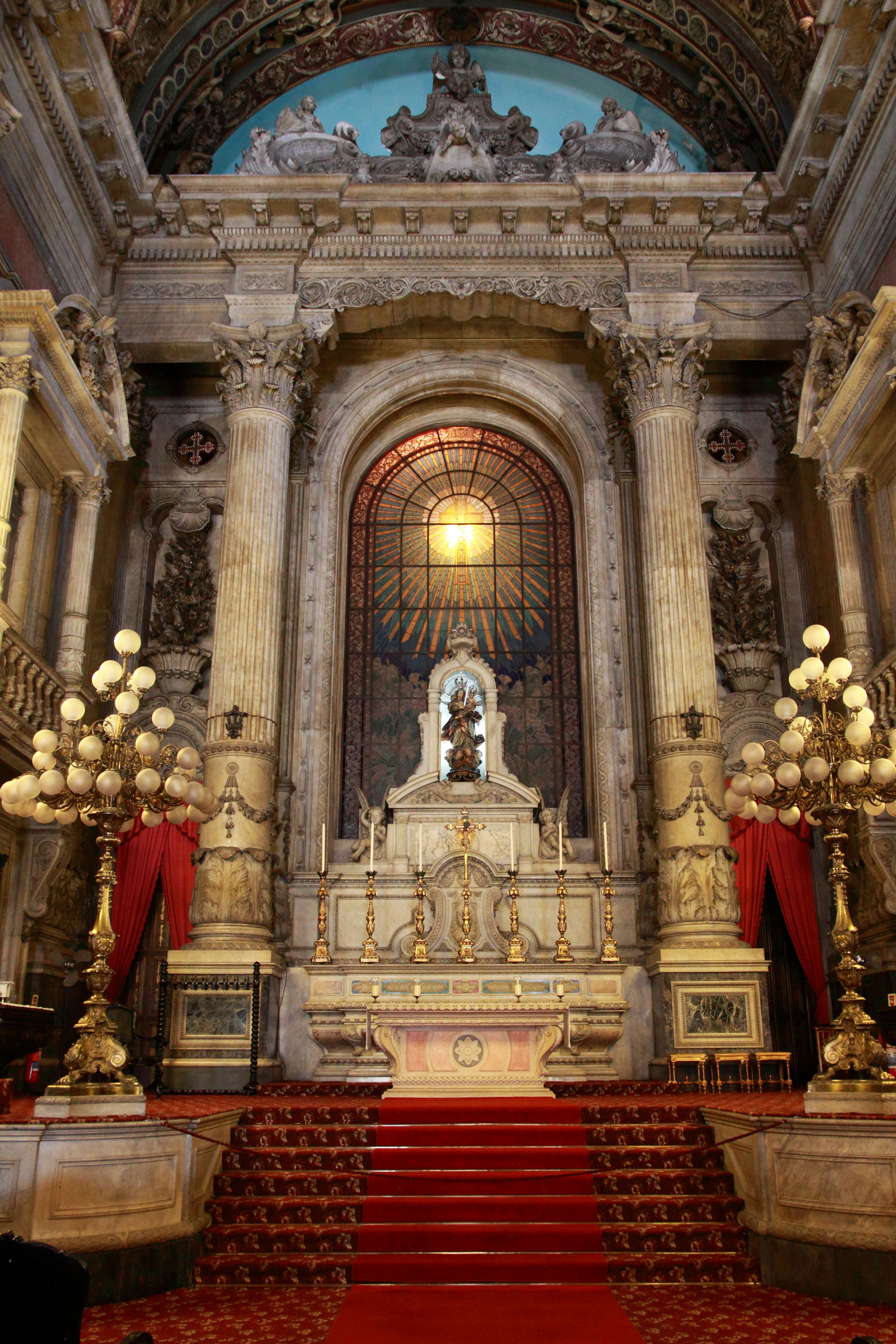
Altar

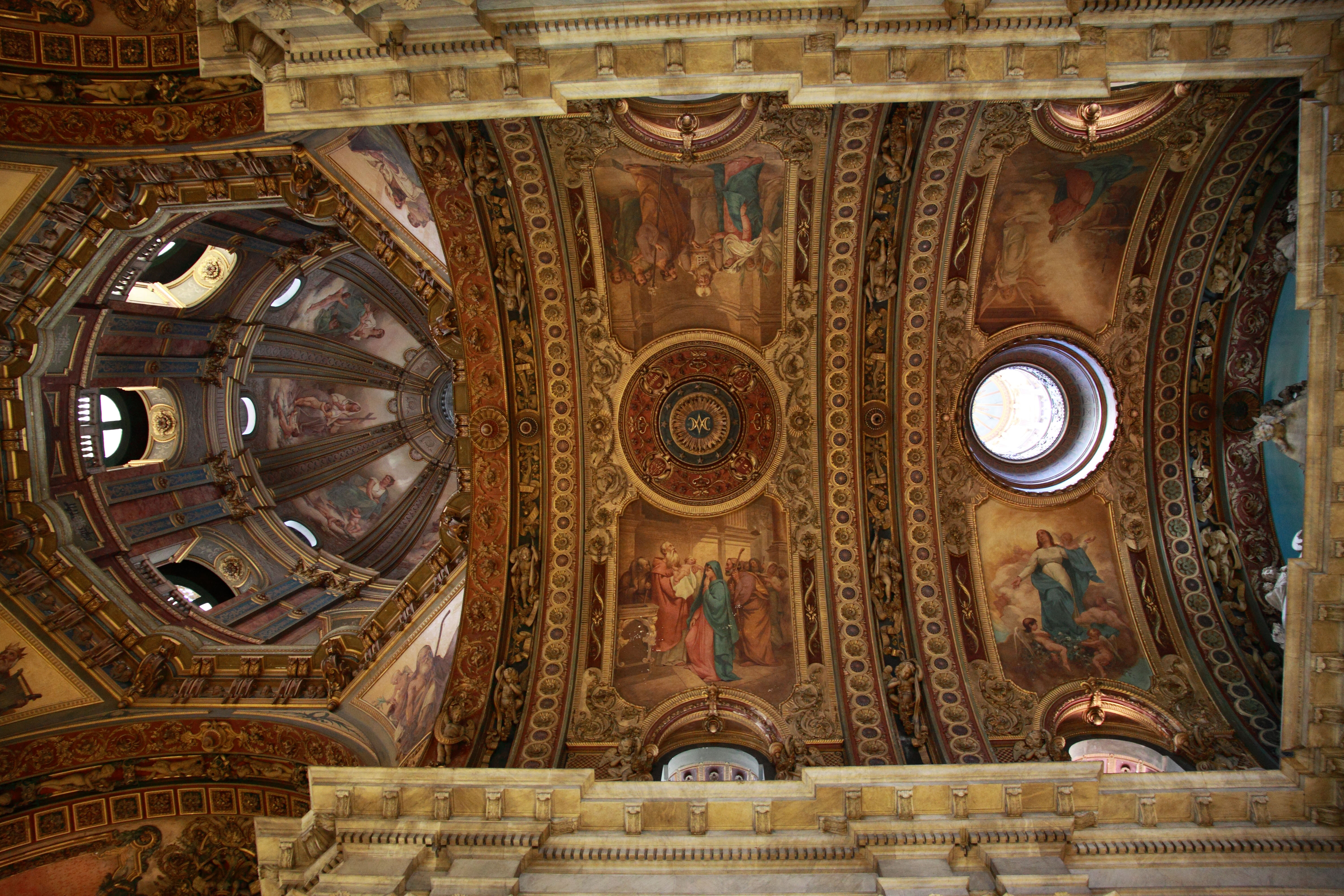
Ceiling of the altar and dome.

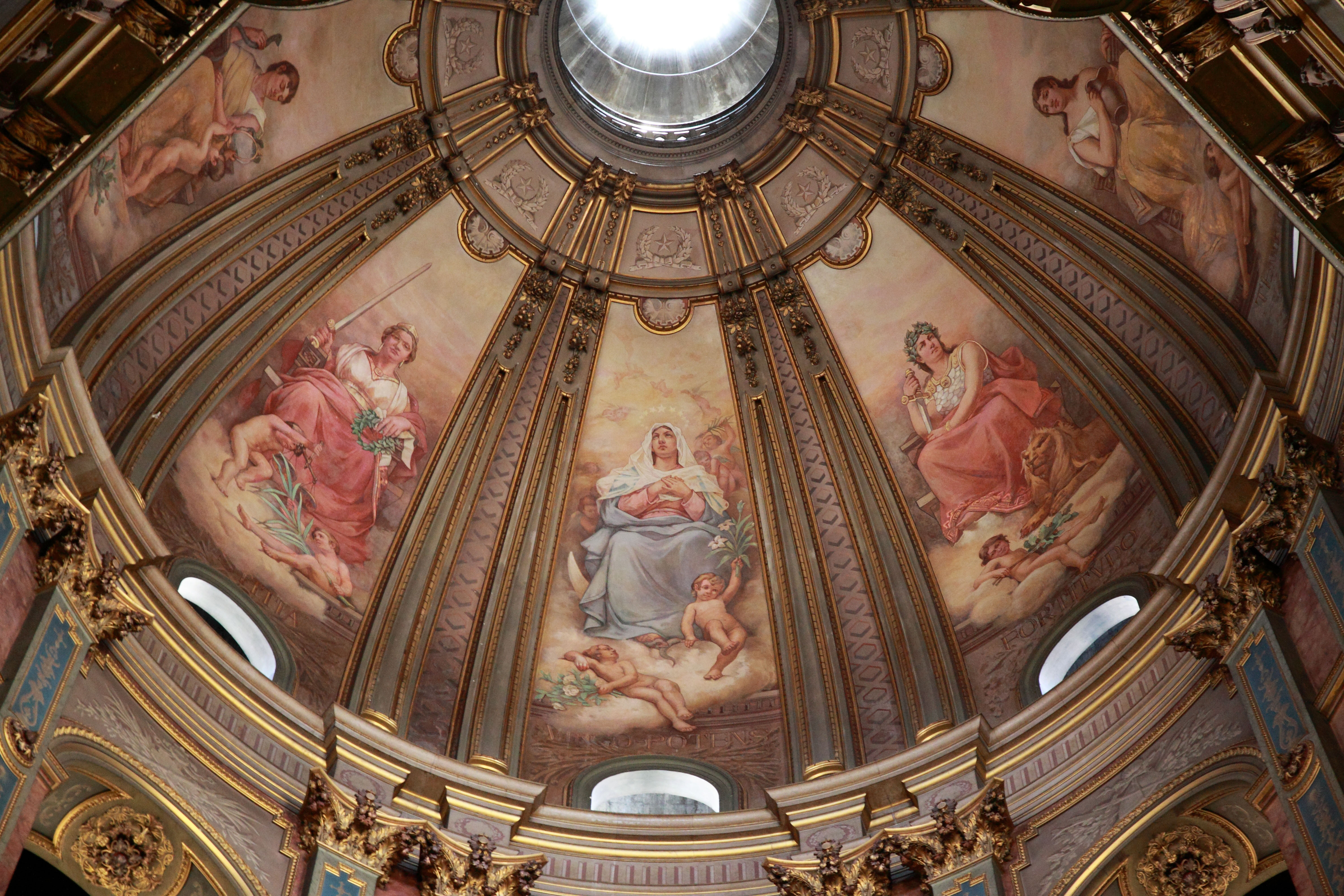
Dome

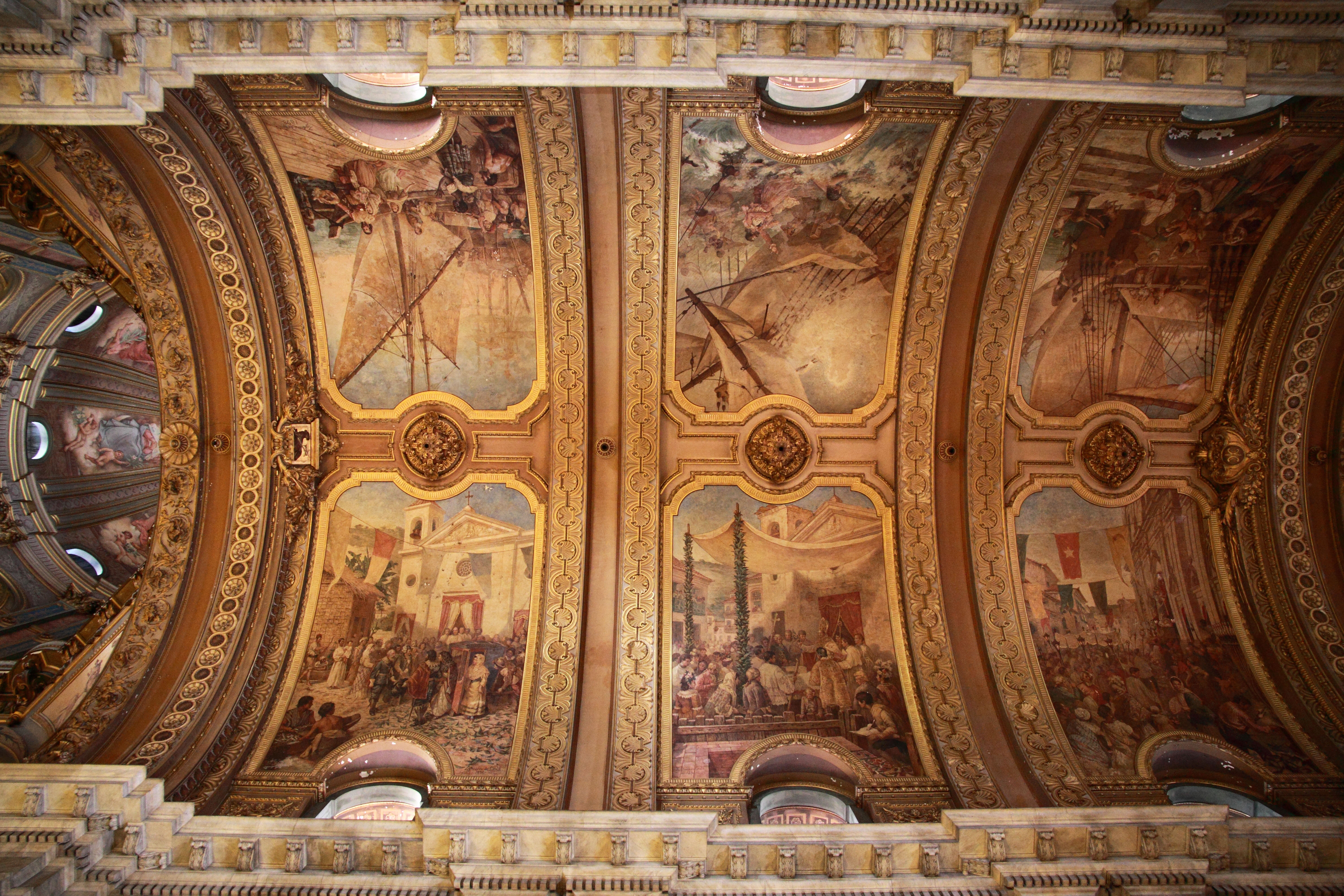
Ceiling of the Church.

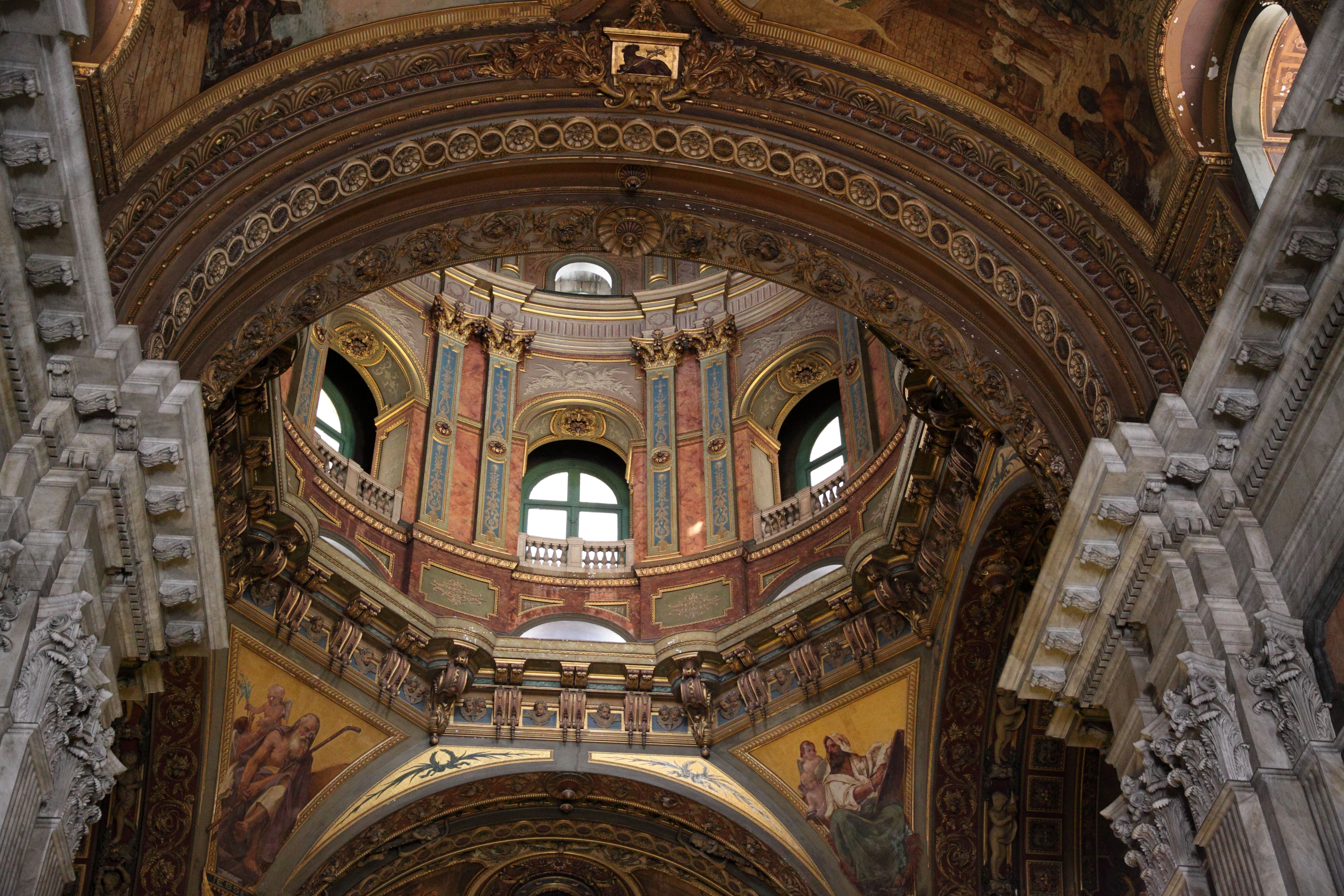
Arch of the nave.

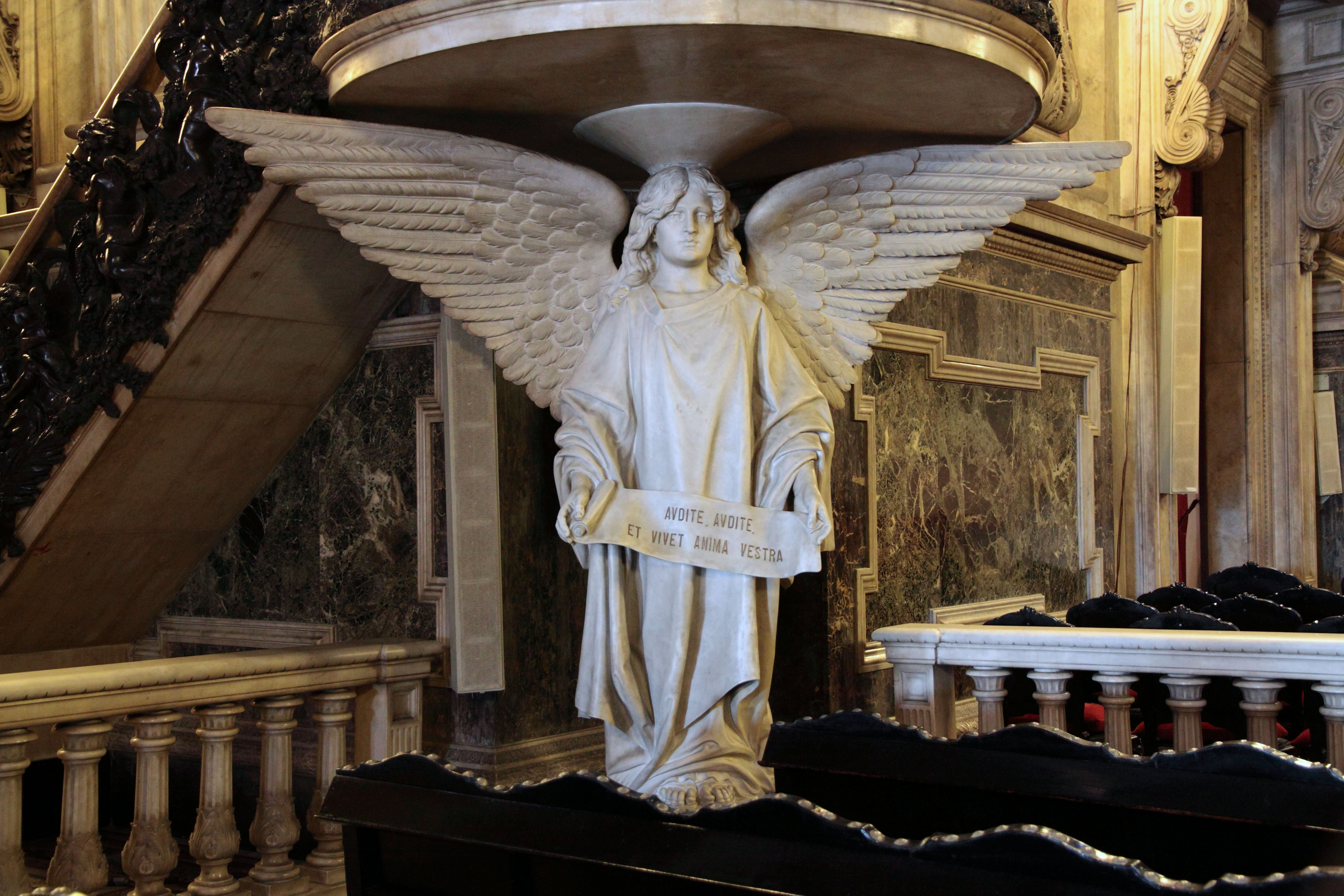
Sculpture beneath the pulpit.

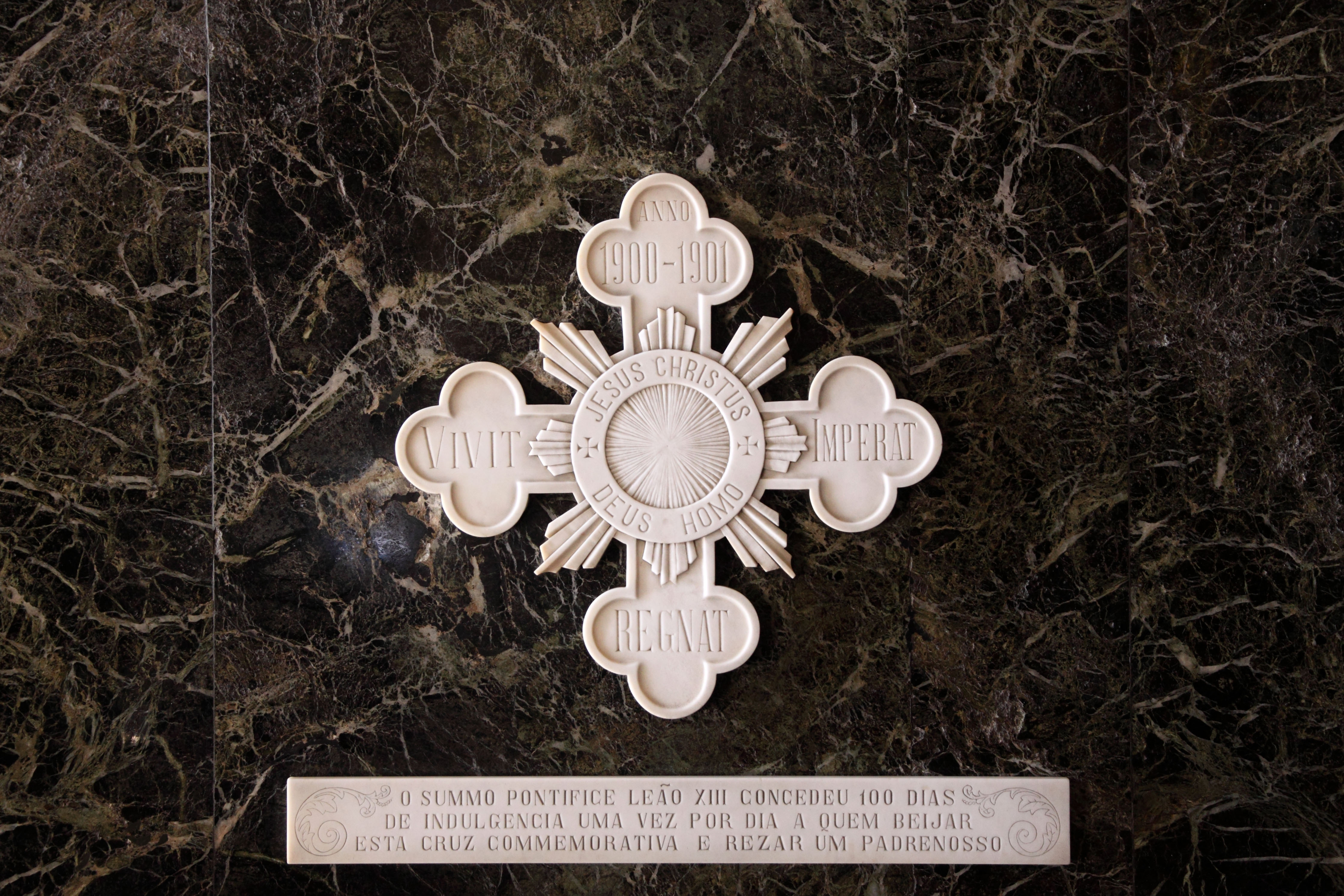
Cross of Indulgence

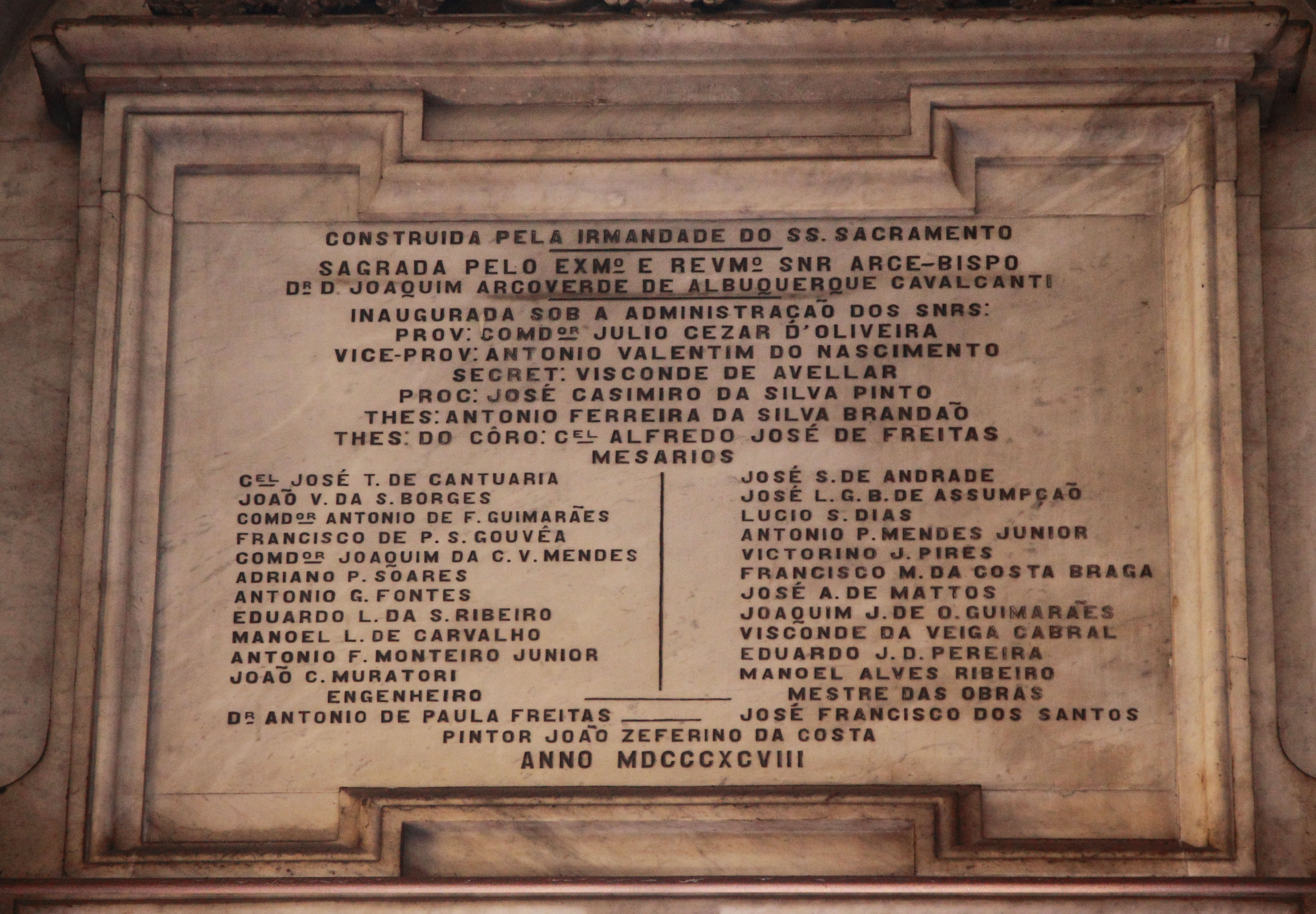
Plaque

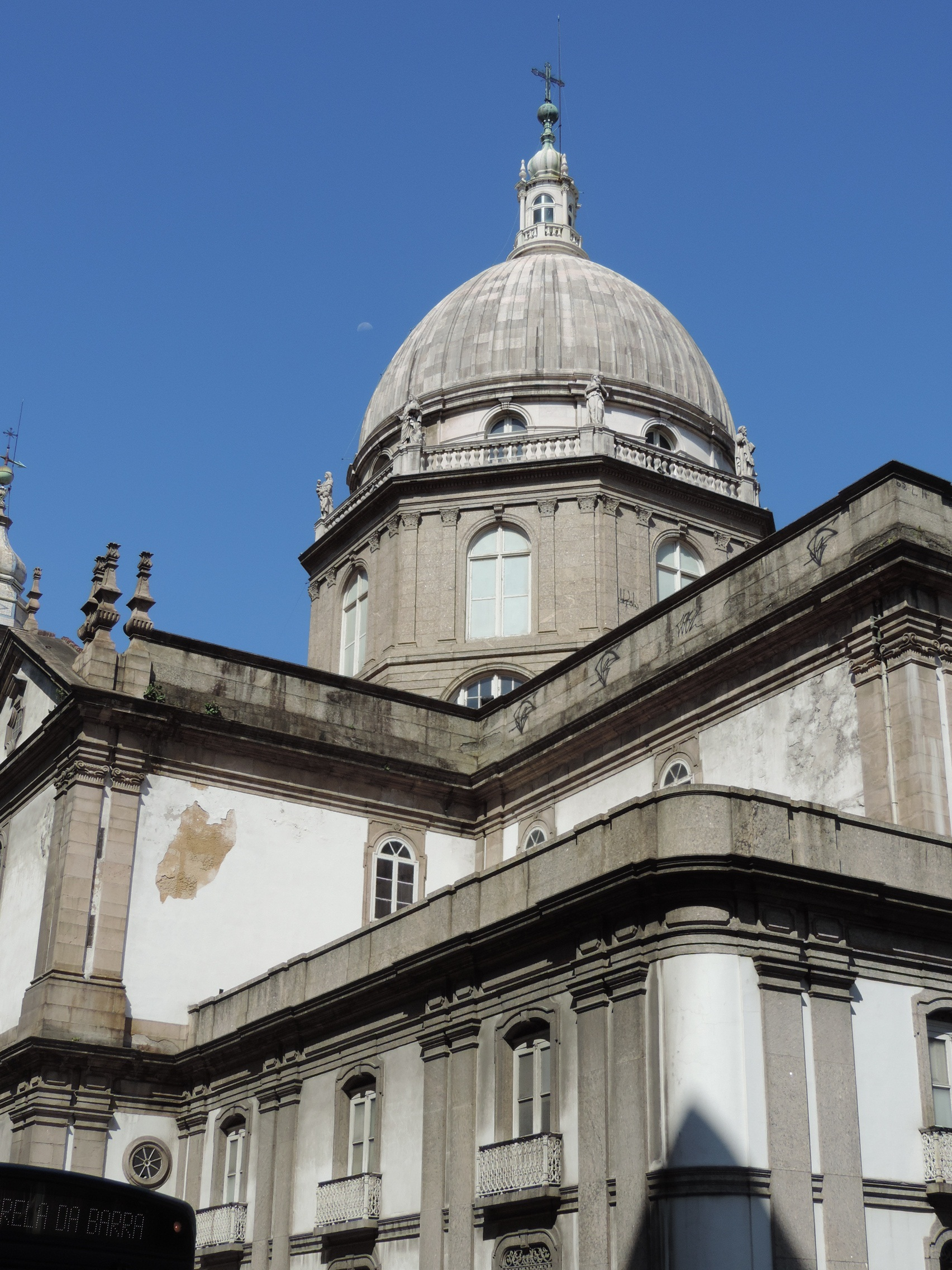
External view of the dome.

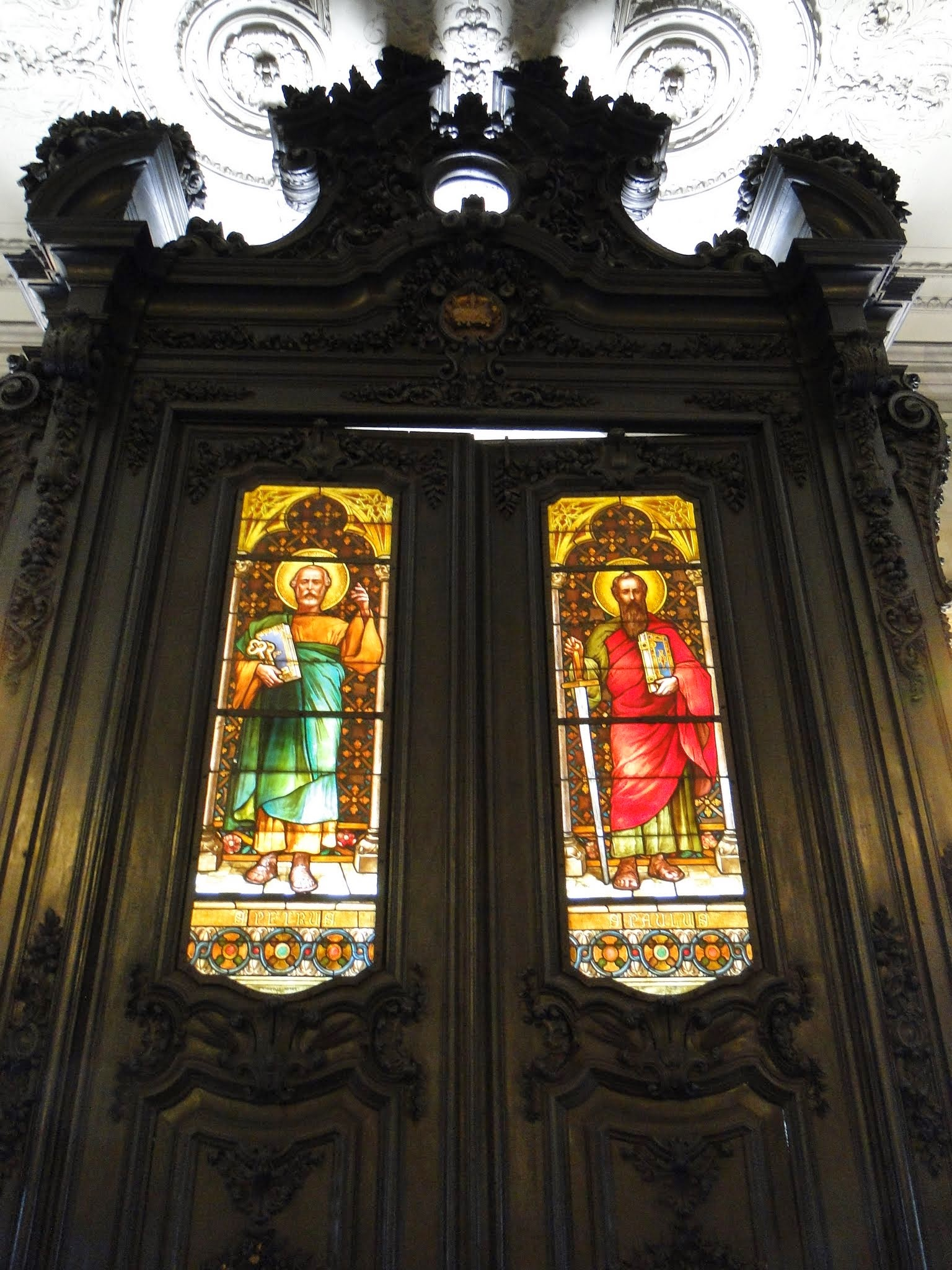
Ancient doors

== See also ==
- Basilica of Our Lady of Candelaria (Medellín, Colombia)
- Basilica of Candelaria (Tenerife, Spain)
- Sé Catedral de Nossa Senhora da Candelária (Bissau, Guinea-Bissau)
- 18th-century Western domes
