= Murder of Andrew Kissel =

American real estate developer

- Date: April 3, 2006
- Location: Greenwich, Connecticut
- Type: Murder
- Cause: Stabbing
- Target: Andrew Michael Kissel
- Perpetrators: Carlos Trujillo; Leonard Trujillo; Jair Trujillo
- Deaths: 1
- Arrests: 3
- Convictions: Attempted murder (Carlos); Manslaughter & Conspiracy to commit manslaughter (Leonard)
- Sentence: 6-year imprisonment plus deportation (Carlos); 20-year imprisonment (Leonard)

Andrew Michael Kissel (August 23, 1959 – April 3, 2006) was an American real estate developer who was found murdered at his rented Greenwich, Connecticut estate. Kissel had been accused of defrauding a New York co-op board of millions of dollars.

His body was found by workers from a moving company. He had been stabbed to death in the basement of the home. The motive for his murder was a mystery, as there were many people who had problems with him, including those from the U.S. Justice Department, several multi-billion dollar corporations/conglomerates, and his own wife. Kissel's chauffeur and his cousin were later found guilty in association with the murder.

Kissel was a resident of Woodcliff Lake, New Jersey and later of Saddle River, New Jersey.

Coincidentally his brother, Robert Kissel, was murdered on November 2, 2003 in Hong Kong by his (Robert's) wife, Nancy Kissel.

== Fraud charges ==
From 1995 to 2002, Kissel had been the treasurer of the co-op board at 200 East 74th Street in Manhattan. He had a great deal of autonomy and sole signing authority over the Board's bank account. He arranged a refinancing plan, to create a reserve fund and pay for renovations to the building, but also siphoned money into his own account, forged statements, and eventually embezzled $3.9 million. When the Board confronted him, he confessed and agreed to pay $4.7 million if they agreed to not go public. He entered into a civil settlement in October 2003, and was confident that the matter had been resolved and the board would not go public; however, a grand jury in Manhattan charged Mr. Kissel with grand larceny and other crimes in connection with the $4.7 million that he admitted owing the co-op because of money he took during the seven years he was treasurer.

== Collections ==
Kissel was known for his interest in collectibles and expensive possessions. He owned an 80-foot (24 m) Lazzara yacht that has been valued at $2.8 million. Among the vehicles in his classic-car collection was a 1957 Mercedes valued at $420,000.

Another item in his car collection was one of the original four 1984 Pontiac Trans Am automobiles used in the TV series "Knight Rider". In order to pay off some of the estimated $30 million debt owed to various creditors (including the Internal Revenue Service), many pieces of his collections were sold off. On December 20, 2007 the K.I.T.T. car was listed on eBay for sale with a starting bid of $20,000, which was met by an unspecified bidder. With its authenticity verified, the car was re-listed on eBay on June 12, 2008, again with a starting bid of $20,000. The auction ended without the previous enthusiasm of the first auction and it was purchased by a friend of George Barris, the car's creator.

== Murder and arrests ==
Kissel and his wife, Hayley Wolff, were in the process of moving from the Greenwich house in March 2006. The Kissels were behind in their rent; their landlord had filed a lawsuit claiming the couple had neglected to pay the $14,300 rent for six months. The Kissels had agreed to vacate the premises by March 31.

Members of a moving crew arrived at the mansion to complete the move and found Kissel's body, hands and feet bound, in the basement. He had been stabbed to death.

Kissel's chauffeur, Carlos Trujillo, and Trujillo's cousins Leonard Trujillo and Jair Trujillo, were arrested in March 2008 and charged in his death. Police had followed up on a credit card found during a search of Carlos Trujillo's residence. During a follow-up interview, they were told about a murder plot.

== Trial and subsequent events ==
According to the prosecution, the motive for the murder was the Trujillos' fear that their involvement in laundering money for Kissel would be exposed.

Carlos Trujillo was charged with murder and attempted murder. He was acquitted of the murder charge, as the jury found too many parts of the prosecution's story were left unproven. They were hopelessly deadlocked on the attempted murder charge, so a mistrial was declared. Instead, Carlos Trujillo entered a guilty plea to the attempted murder charge and received a six-year prison sentence, followed by deportation to his home country, Colombia.

Leonard Trujillo pleaded guilty to manslaughter and conspiracy to commit murder. He testified against his cousin Carlos and received a sentence of 20 years.
