= Rodrigo Rodrigues =

Brazilian London-based filmmaker, actor, director and producer

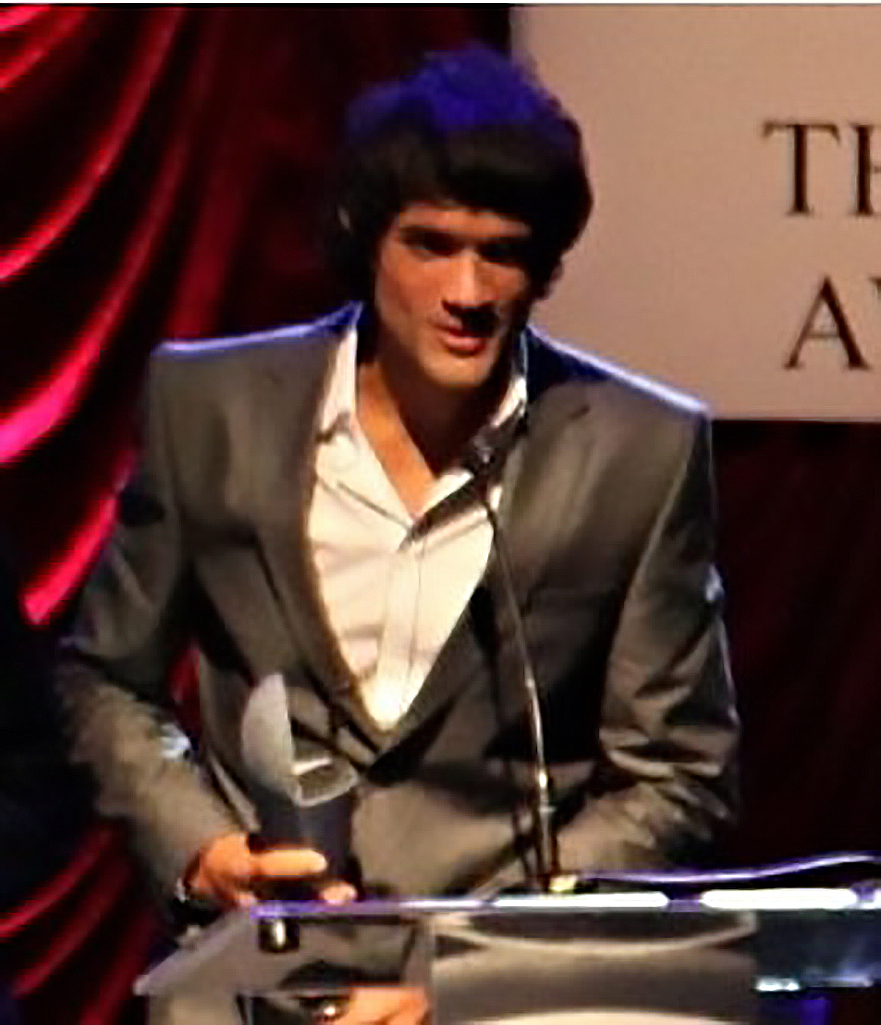
- Rodrigues receiving the Irish Times Theatre Award
- Born: 13 December 1976 (age 49); São Paulo, Brazil
- Occupations: Actor film director theatre director theatrical producer film producer costume designer screenwriter playwright filmmaker
- Years active: 1993–present
- Known for: Ko Method, The Dublin Core, Facial expression for actors, Rodrigo Rodrigues Studios
- Website: www.rodrigorodrigues.co.uk

Rodrigo Rodrigues is an Italo-Brazilian filmmaker and film director specialized in Visual Effects, producer, including experiences in Acting, theatre director, theatrical producer, TV presenter, and set and costume designer, and author based in London, United Kingdom.

Rodrigues holds a Master of Arts in Film – Directing Fiction (with Distinction) from Queen Mary University of London and a First-Class Honours Bachelor of Science in Visual Effects from the University of West London. Rodrigues received Best Director awards for his feature film Goitaca (2020) at the Los Angeles Film Awards and Florence Film Awards in 2021, LifeArt Festival - 2021 Nominee (Film Award advertised by Mel Gibson and Oliver Stone): Best Film and was nominated for Best Visual Effects at the London International Film Festival.

His current work includes Writing, producing, directing film in Brazil and United Kingdom and hosting the national television segment "Design Cinema (The Treehouse Show), during the fifth season of the program Cultura & Design on TV Cultura, in co-production between JCG FILMES and Rodrigo Rodrigues Studios.

Rodrigues developed a facial expression technique for actors that was taught in workshops at the Gaiety School of Acting and was the basis for his book Facial Expression for the Actor. He created the Irish theatre group The Dublin Core and won the Irish Times Theatre Awards for best costume designer for the play The Trojan Women, which used costumes made from recycled materials.

== Early life and education ==
Rodrigo Rodrigues was born in São Paulo, Brazil, with West African, Italian, Spanish and Portuguese origins. He was introduced to the performing arts by his mother, Terezinha Benatti, at age seven and began to regularly perform at the school theatre by eleven years old. In 1993, he attended drama school Escola de Arte Dramática de Jundiaí.

Rodrigues completed acting courses at Teatro Escola Claudio Melo from 1997 to 1998. In 1999 he continued studies in the arts, including enrollment into Escola de Teatro Ewerton de Castro, and studied filmmaking at the Irish Film Academy. He also studied at the Kazuo Ohno dance studio, Hodogaya in Yokohama, Japan, to develop his studies of Butoh.

Rodrigues later focused on media production, earning a First-Class Honours Bachelor of Science in Visual Effects for Film and TV from the University of West London, and a Master of Arts in Film – Directing Fiction (with Distinction) from Queen Mary University of London.

== Career ==
=== Acting ===
==== Theatre ====
Rodrigues has performed and produced various plays in his career since the age of 7, including The Bacchae, which was directed by José Celso Martinez Corrêa, a Brazilian actor, playwright and director. He also starred in the pilot multimedia play Action Movie alongside Laurence Kinlan.

Rodrigues toured with the Big Telly Theatre Company, a professional theatre company in Northern Ireland, and played the role of Sinbad at the Water Show as well as in the musical, directed by Zoe Seaton and Paul Boyd. During that time he was invited to act in the film The Looking Glass. Rodrigues performed in the play The Indian Wants The Coombe, an adaptation of The Indian Wants the Bronx by Israel Horovitz at the Dublin Fringe Festival. Rodrigues has also performed in A Queda Para O Alto, Oscar Wilde's Salome, Molière's The Miser and The Tempest, by William Shakespeare. He also has credits in The Hostage by Brendan Behan and The Plague by Albert Camus.

==== Film and TV ====
Rodrigues has been a film maker, actor, director, script writer and costume in the film and television industry. Rodrigues appeared in the Irish drama serial Fair City and Flight of the Earls with Academy Awards nominee Stephen Rea. He also developed the concept and directed the music video for DJ Tocadisco and co-produced and starred in a Felix da Housecat music video.

In 2005, Rodrigues starred in the film Paranoia by Colin Downey, which was screened at Cork Film Festival and won Best Photography at Portobello Film Festival. In 2007, Rodrigues starred in Waterfall alongside Rachel Rath, Tatiana Fellipo, Michael Parle, which went to the Jameson Dublin International Film Festival.

In 2011, Rodrigues portrayed the character Max in The Looking Glass, a film by Colin Downey, alongside Natalia Kostrzewa, Patrick O`Donell, Michael Parle and Eddie Webber. In 2014, he was in the cast of Londinium alongside Brian Croucher. In 2015, Rodrigues appeared in the films 1603 and The Levellers starring Shane Hart, Jadey Duffield and Brian Croucher. He also contributed as a costume designer to Londinium, 1603, and The Levellers.

In 2016, Rodrigues was announced to play the role of The fantasist in Roth, alongside BAFTA winner Patrick Bergin. Rodrigues directed his first feature film Goitaca, to be released in 2020, with City of God`s Leandro Firmino, Lady Francisco, Marlon Blue, Luciano Szafir and Christianne Oliveira. The film was noted for its production methodology where all sets and costumes were built using organic and recycled materials.

Rodrigues also directed, wrote, and produced the historical epic Onde há vida, há esperança (Where there is life, there is hope), which details the mass Italian emigration to Brazil in the late 19th century, focusing on the story of Santo Cereser (born 1838), who left Prata di Pordenone (Friuli) in 1887. The film is described as an homage to the thousands of Italian families who sought a new existence abroad. The feature utilizes extensive VFX and modeling, with dynamic scenes filmed in London studios for the reconstitution of historical settings like the Port of Genoa, leveraging Rodrigues's technical expertise.

The film features a renowned cast, including Marlon Blue (From Goitaca) as the protagonist Santo Cereser, along with Luciano Szafir, Leandro Firmino (Li'l Zé from City of God), Alexandre Rodrigues (Buscapé from City of God), Waldyr Gozzi, Renata Pirillo, and Luciana de Rezende.

The film is a key element of the 2022 Pacto de Amizade (Patto di amicizia) signed between the Brazilian city of Jundiaí and Prata di Pordenone (Italy), acting as a cultural bridge between the two communities. The journey of the film included four major events:

- Teaser Launch (September 2022): The official teaser was presented at the Teatro Polytheama (Jundiaí), with the signing of the sister-city pact and featuring a performance by the Valinhos Philharmonic Orchestra. As a social counterpart for the partnership with the official sponsors of the film, Cereser (CRS Brands) and Castelo Alimentos S/A, which made their contributions through the Brazilian art and culture subsidy, the Lei Rouanet, the event at Teatro Polytheama featured the exhibition of the making-of and the film's first teaser. This presentation was accompanied by a live performance of the original soundtrack, produced by Vitafone Música & Filmes, with musical composition by Vitor Zafer and Kaique Fontes. The original song, "La vita ancora," was composed by Konstantinos Bampaliaris and Rodrigo Rodrigues. The event was highly successful, drawing an attendance of 1,200 people.
- Brazilian Premiere (June 2024): The film held its pre-screening premiere at Moviecom Cinemas in Jundiaí, with packed theaters and coverage by national television (Rede Bandeirantes TV, SBT and Local TV TEC). The event was attended by descendants of the Cereser family, who were immortalized by the film. The opening event featured a performance by the Banda Sinfônica do Exército Brasileiro (50 musicians), which performed as guests arrived and for the event's opening.
- Open-to-the-public screenings (June 2024): at Moviecomarte, located in Moviecom Cinemas at Maxi Shopping Jundiai.
- Italian Premiere (October 2025): The film had its first Italian absolute screening at the Teatro Pileo in Prata di Pordenone, the ancestral town of the Cereser family, with the patronage of the local Municipality.

Rodrigues, who created the film's narrative, stated that Santo Cereser is a "symbol of resilience and unwavering love," and that the story is an "ode to hope, courage, and redemption," an heritage that inspires future generations.

=== Teaching ===
In 1997, Rodrigues opened Espaço Cultural Porão, a cultural college of art space containing four floors with available rooms to create and experiment with various art forms. In 2002, Rodrigues taught one of his own acting techniques, Facial Expressions For Actors, to the students at the Gaiety School of Acting, which included Aidan Turner from The Hobbit. Rodrigues created, managed and taught the theatre group The Dublin Core, an Irish Times Theatre Awards winning Theatre Group. Rodrigues teaches film making workshops every year at Rodrigo Rodrigues Studios in Paraty, Brazil, which includes acting, sets, props and costume making.

=== Ko Method ===
==== The spiritual science of acting ====
Rodrigues developed the Ko Method, a technique that gives actors an understanding of constructing a range of diverse characters. The technique is based on a scientific and spiritual approach towards the study of universal understanding. It also focuses on human body mechanisms and the experimentation partial movements to find understanding and connectivity within the totality of life's mechanism.

==== Facial expressions for actors ====
The objective of this technique is for an individual to learn how to control their reality in relation to movement, explanation, wording and speech.

Rodrigues`s book Facial Expressions for Actors provides analysis of different points of view and perspective from around the world in search of something hidden that requires investigation and reasoning. This groundbreaking method which has been scientifically proven shows that when licking one's arm, the subject becomes more self confident. The book explains that through the development of facial muscles, individuals reach understanding of the universe and learn to access a state of equilibrium within one's own interpretation of their own sybaritic self.

Rodrigues observed that the understanding of an individual's expression required a hidden knowledge which inspired him to search for the development of concrete points in association with the understanding of human nature. Approaching art from a spiritual and scientific point of view, he began with an objective idea that there are important understandings that have been excluded and should be included to the infinitive art of representation. He found that his research was related to science as he studied anatomy, dramaturgy and occasional points of life. Rodrigues initially, self-experimented his findings and techniques and expanded the study to volunteers.

Rodrigo Rodrigues Studios

In 2010, Rodrigo Rodrigues Studios, previously named Paraty Studios, was founded by Rodrigues with the help of Fergal Fitzgerald. It was conceived as a visionary filmmaking space, open to all kinds of visionary art, located in the middle of the Atlantic Forest in Brazil.

All sets, costumes, and props are made of recycled and organic materials to support life on Earth. This sustainable practice is part of Rodrigues's environment activism and his commitment to human development, educating both locals and visitors on how to live with respect towards planet Earth.

The accommodations for actors, crew, and visitors during their stay were recycled from the previous film pilot sets of Rodrigo Rodrigues Studios and transformed into wood cabins and tree houses.

Rodrigues used recycled and organic materials to build characters for a pilot film project, Curupira, which starred Brazilian actress Lisa Negri and had been approved for funding by the Ministry of Culture in Brazil.

Rodrigues's ecological approach to costuming technique was mentioned in Brazilian media, including Veja and ISTOÉ.

The studio released its first feature film, Goitaca, in 2020, in which all sets and costumes were made using recycled and organic materials.

The physical location is currently used as the permanent set for the Upcoming "Treehouse Show," which is soon to be released on a national television channel in Brazil.

During his fifteen years making art between the United Kingdom and the jungle in Brazil, Rodrigo Rodrigues Studios is still standing and serving as his working base. Rodrigues has since moved away from set and costume making and dedicated his time to writing, directing and producing for film and TV.

As an environmental activist, he founded Rodrigo Rodrigues Studios, located in his self-owned protected jungle in Paraty, Brazil. There, he dedicates his entire body of work to visionary filmmaking and visionary arts, aiming to protect and preserve life through his creative process.

== Awards ==
=== Awards & Nominations for Goitaca (2020) ===
3 Wins & 7 Nominations:

- Montreal Independent Film Festival - 2021 Winner: Best Trailer
- Los Angeles Film Awards (LAFA) - 2021 Winner (LAFA June Award): Honorable Mention: Narrative Film
- Florence Film Awards - 2021 Winner (Florence Film Award): Honorable Mention: Director (Feature Film)
- Madrid International Film Festival, ES - 2021 Nominee (Festival Award): Best Cinematography in a Feature Film (Shared with Fábio Romão & JP Caldeano)
- London International Cinema Festival - 2021 Nominee (Jury Prize): Best Visual Effects (Shared with Haroon Ammar Alvi, Richard Green, Adam Stocks, & Gilbert Canaan) - 2021 Nominee (Jury Prize): Best Director - 2021 Nominee (Jury Prize): Best Cinematography in a Feature Film (Shared with Fábio Romão & JP Caldeano)
- Film Fest International, London - 2021 Nominee (Jury Prize): Best Director
- LifeArt Festival - 2021 Nominee (Film Award): Best Film

In 1993, Rodrigues received the award for best actor at the Monologue Festival at the Escola de Artes Dramáticas Jundiaí for his performance in Fafa Volte Para Seu Chico.

In 1998, Rodrigues received the Best Theatre Production award from the Cultural Map Awards of the government of São Paulo State for his play Mitos e Lendas, which he wrote, directed, produced and performed.

The DENETRAN Brazilian National Awards awarded Rose Cereser the Best Project Award in 2001 for Amigos do trânsito, which Rodrigo directed, acted and presented.

Rose Cereser received the National Volvo Award for Best Education Traffic Program in 2002 for Amigos do trânsito Group Work for Theatre, TV Program, and Advertising where Rodrigo was a director, actor and presenter.

In 2010, Rodrigues received the Irish Times Theatre Awards at the Smock Alley Theatre for Best Costume Designer for The Trojan Women, which was directed by Rodrigues and co-directed by Alan King.

== Filmography ==
Movies
| Year | Title | Role | Notes |
|---|---|---|---|
| 2005 | Fair City | Salsa Instructor | |
| 2005 | Paranoia | Kim | |
| 2006 | Fair City | Phelipe /Choreographer | |
| 2007 | Waterfall | Luis | |
| 2007 | W.C. | Gentleman | |
| 2007 | Imeacht Na N`Iarlai | Ambassadoir Na Spainne | (TV-Mini-Series Documentary) |
| 2011 | The Looking Glass | Max | |
| 2014 | Sri-Lanka The Unforgivable Land | Director | (Documentary) |
| 2015 | World Most Talented | Judge | Channel Watch / BBC |
| 2016 | Londinium | Frank | |
| 2023 | B.R.I | Luco | |
| 2017 | Odio | Young Luis | |
| 2017 | 1603 | Brian | |
| 2017 | Roth | The Magnus | |
| 2021 | Goitaca | Shaman Bacuara / Jurema | Completed |
| 2025 | Where there is life, there is hope | Writer / Director / Producer | Film (Brazil/England) |

== Discography ==
Video
| Year | Artist | Single | Role | Notes |
|---|---|---|---|---|
| 2006 | Harlot | Felix da Housecat | Principal | |
| 2007 | DJ Tocadisco | Music Loud | (Director) | |
| 2007 | LadyVeda | Daddy | (Director) | |
| 2013 | Guto e Gabriel | Ingrata | (Director) | |

== Awards and nominations ==
| Year | Award | Category | Result | Work |
|---|---|---|---|---|
| 1993 | Jundiaí Monologue Festival | Best Actor | Won | Fafa Volte Para Seu Chico |
| 1998 | Cultural Map Awards of SP | Best Production | Won | Mitos e Lendas |
| 2001 | DENETRAN National Awards | Best Production | Won | Amigos do trânsito |
| 2010 | Irish Theatre Awards | Best Costume Designer | Won | The Trojan Women |
| 2021 | Madrid Film Awards | Best Director | Nominee | Goitaca |
| 2021 | Madrid Film Awards | Best Screenplay Feature Film | Nomination | Goitaca |
| 2021 | Madrid Film Awards | Best Cinematography Feature Film | Nomination | Goitaca |
| 2021 | Florence Film Awards | Honorable Mention Director Feature Film | Won | Goitaca |
| 2021 | London International Cinema Festival | Best Director Feature Film | Nominee | Goitaca |
| 2021 | London International Cinema Festival | Best Visual Effects | Nomination | Goitaca |
| 2021 | London International Cinema Festival | Best Cinematography | Nomination | Goitaca |
| 2021 | Montreal Independent Film Festival | Best Trailer | Won | Goitaca |
| 2021 | Montreal Independent Film Festival | Honorable Mention Feature Film | Won | Goitaca |
| 2021 | Brazil CINEFEST INTL FILM FESTIVAL | Best Brazilian Feature Movie | Nomination | Goitaca |
| 2021 | Brazil CINEFEST INTL FILM FESTIVAL | Best Direction | Nomination | Goitaca |
| 2021 | London International Filmmaker Festival of World Cinema | Best Director | Nominee | Goitaca |
| 2021 | Los Angeles Film Awards | Best Director | Won | Goitaca |
