= Christianne Oliveira =

Brazilian actress (born 1971)

Christianne Oliveira (previously Christianne Gadd) is a Brazilian actress, known for playing Donna Doyle on Night and Day from 2001 to 2003, Carla Mitchell on EastEnders in 2006 and Countess Belanova on The Great from 2020 to 2023.

== Career ==
Oliveira also appeared in the movie Chocolat with Johnny Depp in 2000, playing Chitza.

In 2003, she appeared in a video clip of the Arabian singer Amr Diab. The clip was on song (Ana ayesh) and Oliveira was the sweetheart of Amr Diab in the clip, which was popular in Egypt and the Middle East.

Oliveira joined the cast of EastEnders when playing Carla Mitchell. She got the part after having strong sexual chemistry with Ross Kemp, who plays her on-screen husband, Grant Mitchell, at her audition.

She joined the cast of Rodrigo Rodrigues`s Goitaca with Marlon Blue, Leandro Firmino, Luciano Szafir and Lady Francisco.

From 2020 to 2023, Oliveira recurred as Countess Belanova in The Great alongside Nicholas Hoult and Elle Fanning.

== Quotes ==
- "It's a real delight to be invited to work on such a well-known show. I have been a fan of Ross' work for many years now so working with him will be a true pleasure." ~ Daily Star Sunday, 19 February 2006.

In 2009, she had a part in the Belgian series het "goddelijke monster"

== Filmography ==
- 2000 – Chocolat – Chitza
- 2003 – Night and Day – Donna Doyle
- 2006 – EastEnders – Carla Mitchell
- 2020–2023 – The Great – Countess Belanova
- 2021 – Goitaca – Camapua
- 2021 – Pecado Vermelho – Geralda

== Trivia ==
Christianne appeared in former pop star Kavana's music video "Crazy Chance" back in 1997.

== Awards and nominations ==
Year	Award	Category	Result	Work
2021	London International Film Festival Awards	Best Supporting Actress	Won	Goitaca
2021	Buenos Aires International Film Festival Awards	Best Supporting Actress	Nominated	Goitaca
