= Konrad Begg =

Scottish film and television director

- Born: 17 March 1972 (age 54); Ayr, Scotland
- Occupations: Director, writer and producer
- Years active: 1997–present
- Known for: Top Gear, Songs for Amy, father of Innes Begg

Konrad Begg (born 17 March 1972) is a Scottish film and television director. He has directed numerous TV shows, most notably BBC's Top Gear.

In 2012, he completed his first feature film, Songs For Amy. The Irish-based film had its European premiere at the Galway Film Fleadh and won the Outstanding Achievement in Filmmaking award at the Newport Beach Film Festival.

Begg also directs commercials through KODE London and Slash Dynamic in Los Angeles.

== Career ==
=== Film ===
In 2012, Begg completed his debut feature film, Songs for Amy. It was predominantly set in Kinvara, County Galway, though other scenes were shot in Galway City, Ireland and New York City, United States. The film starred Sean Maguire, Patrick Bergin, and James Cosmo. Songs for Amy is a dark comedy and was inspired by the music scene in the West of Ireland.

Before its cinema release, Songs for Amy was selected for a raft of international film festivals. It won the Outstanding Achievement in Filmmaking award at the Newport Beach Film Festival. It ranked fourth out of the 400 films at the Newport Beach Film Festival, based on the audience ratings. The European premiere of the film was at the Galway Film Fleadh.

Hot Press Magazine praised the film, calling it "The feelgood Irish Hit of the Year." The List magazine said, "This touching romp is so much more than Ireland’s answer to ‘The Hangover’", while the LA Times said that the film was "Taking the cliche out of the love story". The Daily Mirror's film critic David Edwards also praised the film, scoring it four out of five stars and saying "this indie flick was an unexpected treat."

In 2021, Konrad completed the short film Hireth starring Tom Rhys Harries. The film had its premiere at Manns Chinese Theatre in Los Angeles and went on to screen at numerous international festivals garnering several award nominations.

Begg's second feature film, The Detour, is currently in development.

== Recognition ==
- BAFTA – Television Craft Awards nomination (2012).
- BAFTA Scotland – nomination (2007).
- Newport Beach Film Festival – Outstanding Achievement in Filmmaking (2012).
- Royal Television Society Award (2013).

== Filmography ==
Title	Airing/release date	Studio	Position	Format
Terror Alert	2004	BBC	Director	Television programme
Robbie Coltrane's B Road Britain	2007	ITV	Director & writer	Television programme
Serial Killers	2009	BBC	Director & writer	Television programme
Rivers with Griff Rhys Jones	2009	BBC	Director & producer	Television programme
Three Men go to Scotland	2010	BBC	Director	Television programme
Songs for Amy	2012	Sonny and Skye Productions	Director & writer	Film
Racing Legends	2012–13	BBC	Director	Television programme
Top Gear	2010–2014	BBC	Director	Television programme
