= The Singleton (film) =

2015 film directed by Paul J. Lane

- Directed by: Paul J. Lane
- Screenplay by: Mary Thomson
- Starring: Marlon Blue; Karen Fairfax; Shane Hart; Jadey Duffield
- Music by: Kirsty Keogh; Paul B. Allen III
- Production company: PJL Films
- Release date: 21 December 2015 (United Kingdom)
- Country: United Kingdom
- Language: English

The Singleton is a British drama film, directed by Paul J. Lane. The film stars Marlon Blue, Karen Fairfax, Shane Hart, Jadey Duffield, Carl T. James and Gillian Broderick.

== Cast ==
- Marlon Blue as Kudos
- Karen Fairfax as Alexa
- Paul J. Lane as Crimson Blake
- Jadey Duffield as Karma
- Shane Hart as Jeremiah
- Tony Fadil as Father Tom
- Trevor Clarke as Uncle
- Gillian Broderick as Sister Mary
- Sally Bosman as Nanna
- Kerry Hurst as Layla
- Carl T. James as Father Kerry
- Mark Kempson as Tim
- Alan Lambert as John
- Julie Petite as Safro
- Scott Lincoln as Father Flint
- Luis J. Rose as Scarlett
- Mark Der Ver as Barman

=== Filming locations ===
Filming took place in Devon, Plymouth, Sutton Valence, Berlin and in Málaga, Spain

== Release ==
The film was released on 21 December 2015.
