= The Singleton =

The Singleton may refer to:

- The Singleton (film), a 2015 British drama film
- The Singleton of Glen Ord, a brand of whisky produced by Glen Ord Distillery
