= Goitaca (film) =

- Theatrical poster
- Directed by: Rodrigo Rodrigues
- Written by: Rodrigo Rodrigues
- Based on: Indigenous folklore
- Produced by: Rodrigo Rodrigues
- Starring: Marlon Blue; Leandro Firmino; Rodrigo Rodrigues; Lady Francisco; Luciano Szafir; Mácximo Bóssimo; Christianne Oliveira
- Cinematography: Fabio Romao; JP Caldeano; Rodrigo Rodrigues
- Edited by: Marc de Ver
- Music by: Hebert Quinteros
- Production company: Rodrigo Rodrigues Studios
- Release date: 2021
- Countries: Brazil; United States; United Kingdom; France; Germany
- Languages: English; Portuguese; Indigo; Spanish; Chinese; German; Latin; French

Goitaca (Portuguese: Goitacá) is a 2021 indigenous adventure drama film directed by Rodrigo Rodrigues, shot in the Atlantic Rainforest in Brazil.

== Premise ==
The film tells the story between two divisive indigenous tribes during a time long past in history: the Goitaca, and an unknown tribe which embarks on a journey to find new lands in order to live peacefully.

== Cast ==
- Marlon Blue as Candea
- Leandro Firmino as Goitaca Chief
- Rodrigo Rodrigues as Shaman Bacuara and Jurema
- Lady Francisco as Mother Ci and Iara—Mother of Water
- Luciano Szafir as Maracajaguacu
- Christianne Oliveira as Camapua
- Macximo Bossimo as Chief Catu
- Helder Cardozo as Shaman Abeguar
- Betto Marque as Obita
- Olivia Harriet as Mermaid Iara
- Daniel Bauerfeldt as Obajara
- Joao Alberto Tchian as The secret
- Dinosio Correa as Apua
- Evelyn Mayrink as Jacina
- Fernanda Magnani as Candea's mother
- Marcos Accogli as Iara's guardian/Wooden mermaid
- Arthur Benatti Teixeira as The guardian of the stars
- Bradley Rodgers as Candea Pequeno (Voice)
- Emilio Dante as Jaguarari (Voice)
- Sally Bosman as Iara and Mother Ci (Voice)
- Mark Keegan as Iara's guardian (Voice)
- Jim Cooper as The Secret (Voice)
- Lucas Jordan as Indigenous warrior
- Victor Vasconcelos as Candea pequeno
- Danillo Sales as Jaguarari
- Diogo Alves as Taquarace Pequeno
- Yago Brasil as Taquarace
- Victoria Vasconcelos as Camapua Pequeno
- Pedro Malta as Chief Aimore
- Bruna Barbosa as Indigenous waterfall

== Production ==
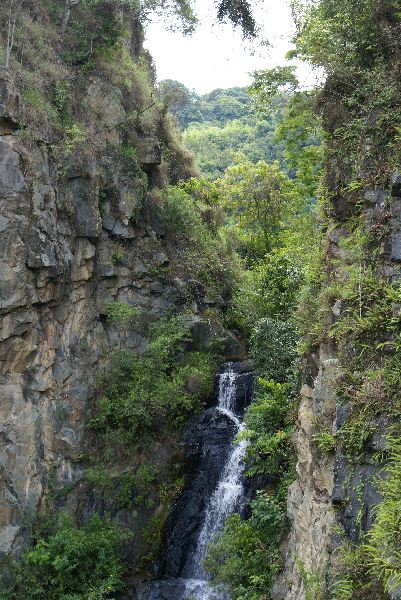
Atlantic forest in Brazil.

The film is inspired by Rodrigues's experiences during his time in the Atlantic rain forest. Rodrigues stated that the spirits of the rain forest led him to write the screenplay within three days and nights during his stay.

=== Locations ===
Goitaca was filmed at Rodrigo Rodrigues Studios Paraty, in the Atlantic region of Brazil. Five weeks were spent near Ipiabas, in the state of Rio, the department of Fazenda Sao Sebastiao, and ten weeks in Paraty between July 2016 until August 2019.

Location details include:

Pre-production: United Kingdom/Brazil

- London.
- Jundiai
- Itupeva
- Rio de Janeiro
- Paraty
- Barra do Pirai

Production—Brazil:

- Rodrigo Rodrigues Studios
- Hotel Fazenda Sao Sebastiao
- Pousada Casa Delta
- Hospedaria Abbud & Fernandez
- Barra do Pirai

Post-production—United Kingdom/Brazil/Peru

- London
- Birmingham
- Tarapoto
- Lima
- Jundiai
- Paraty

== Accolades ==
Award	Category	Recipient(s)	Result	Ref
Buenos Aires International Film Festival Awards	Best Supporting Actor	Leandro Firmino	Won	
Buenos Aires International Film Festival Awards	Best Supporting Actress	Christianne Oliveira	Nominated	
Los Angeles Film Awards	Best Director	Rodrigo Rodrigues	Won	
Madrid Film Awards	Best Director	Rodrigo Rodrigues	Nominated	
Madrid Film Awards	Best Screenplay Feature Film	Rodrigo Rodrigues	Nominated	
Madrid Film Awards	Best Cinematography Feature Film	Fabio Romao, JP Caldeano, Rodrigo Rodrigues, Rodrigo Rodrigues Studios (Production Company)	Nominated	
Florence Film Awards	Honorable Mention: Director Feature Film	Rodrigo Rodrigues	Won	
London International Film Festival Awards	Best Director Feature Film	Rodrigo Rodrigues	Nominated	
London International Film Festival Awards	Best Supporting Actress	Christianne Oliveira	Won	
London International Film Festival Awards	Best Lead Actor	Marlon Blue	Nominated	
London International Film Festival Awards	Best Visual Effects	Haroon Ammar Alvi, Richard Green, Rodrigo Rodrigues, Adam Stocks, Gilbert Canaan	Nominated	
London International Film Festival Awards	Best Cinematography	Fabio Romao, JP Caldeano, Rodrigo Rodrigues, Rodrigo Rodrigues Studios (Production Company)	Nominated	
London International Film Festival Awards	Jury Award	Rodrigo Rodrigues Studios (Production Company)	Nominated	
Montreal Independent Film Festival Awards	Best Trailer	Rodrigo Rodrigues	Won	
Montreal Independent Film Festival Awards	Honorable Mention Feature Film	Rodrigo Rodrigues	Won	
Brazil Cinefest International Film Festival Awards	Best Brazilian Feature Movie	Rodrigo Rodrigues	Nominated	
Brazil Cinefest International Film Festival Awards	Best Direction	Rodrigo Rodrigues	Nominated	
London International Filmmaker Festival Awards of World Cinema	Best Director	Rodrigo Rodrigues	Nominated	
