= Across the River =

Across the River may refer to:

- "Across the River" (song), a 1990 hit song by Bruce Hornsby and the Range from the album A Night on the Town
- "Across the River", a song by Anthrax from Fistful of Metal, 1984
- "Across the River", a song by Peter Gabriel from Secret World Live
- Across the River (film), a 2016 British drama film

== See also ==
- Across the River and into the Trees, a 1950 novel by Ernest Hemingway
- Across the River to Motor City, a Canadian television drama series of 2007-08
- "Let us cross over the river and rest under the shade of the trees", last words of U.S. Civil War General Stonewall Jackson
- Nadiya Ke Paar (disambiguation)
