= Treberth =

Coordinates: 51.593851°N 2.943428°W

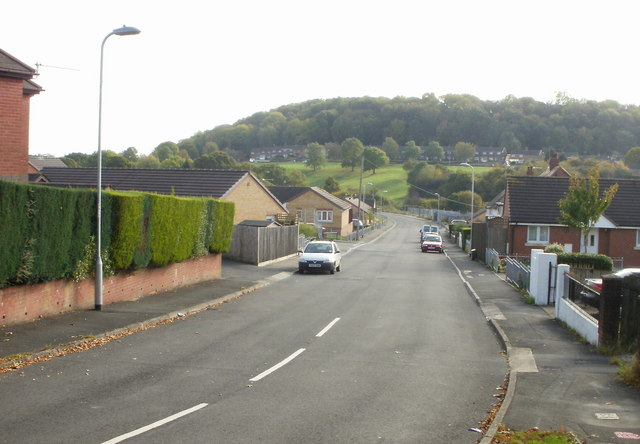

- Location within Newport
- Population: 1,600 approx.
- OS grid reference: ST334870
- Principal area: Newport
- Country: Wales
- Sovereign state: United Kingdom
- Post town: NEWPORT
- Postcode district: NP19 9
- Dialling code: 01633; Maindee exchange
- Police: Gwent
- Fire: South Wales
- Ambulance: Welsh
- UK Parliament: Newport East

Treberth is a suburb within the electoral ward of Ringland, Newport.

Treberth was previously home to numerous prefab homes. These were built across Wales as part of Winston Churchill's Temporary Housing Programme. The aim was to provide housing for people in the wake of World War II, as many homes had been destroyed by bombing. Some residents were allocated homes in Treberth in 1946, just a year after the end of WWII.

The prefabs built in Treberth included the Arcon Mk V, a popular bungalow style prefab, that featured double corrugated asbestos cladding, and a distinctive curved roof.

In the 1980s some of the Treberth estate prefabs began being demolished, and replaced with more modern brick buildings. This demolition continued into the early 2000's, despite attempts by Under the Thatch to preserve one of the post-war buildings.
