= Wire Daisies =

British band

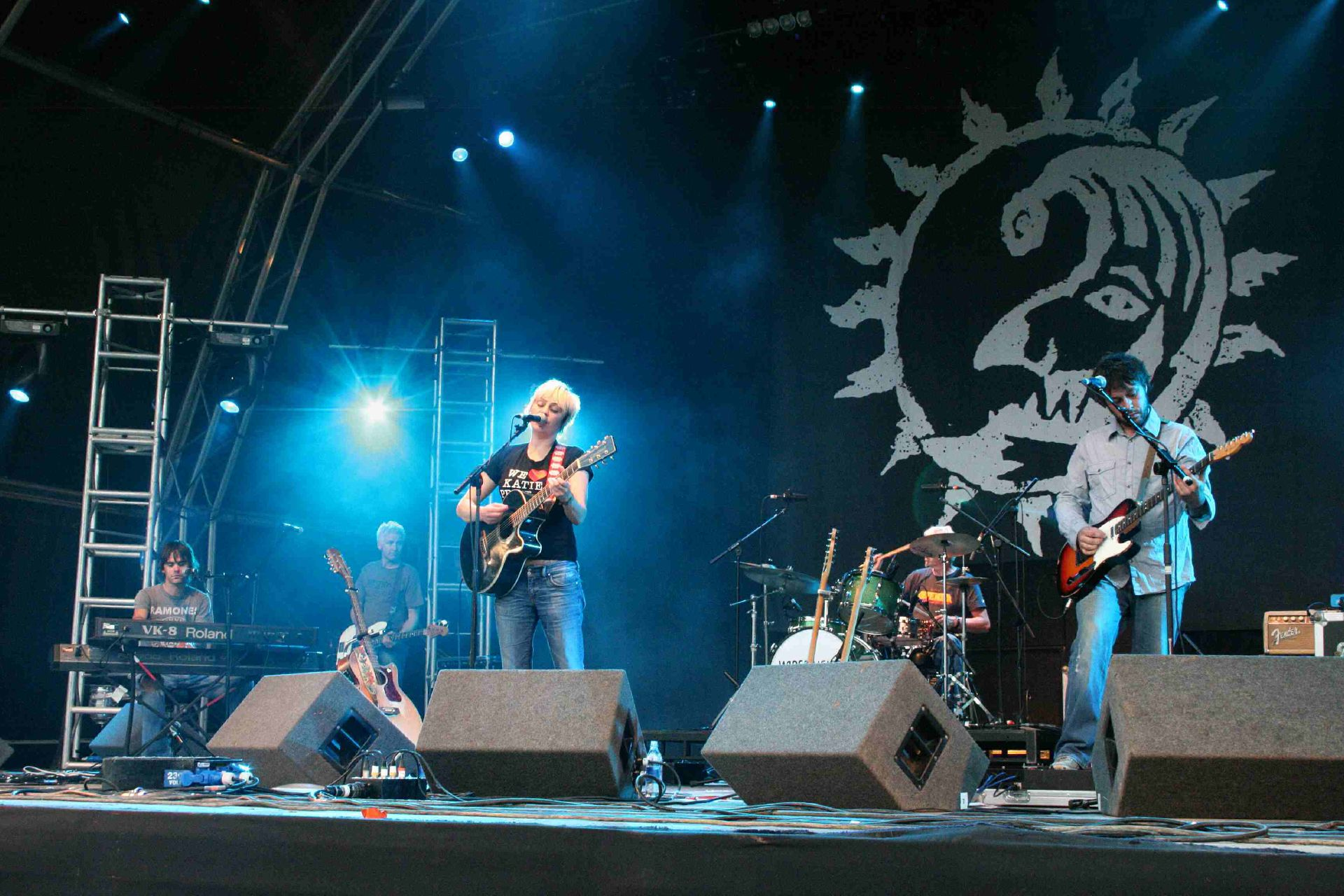
- Wire Daisies; 21 August 2007

Background information
- Origin: Cornwall, England
- Years active: 2002–2007
- Labels: Transistor Project, EMI
- Members: Treana Morris; Ol Beach; Steve Jackson; Alden Evans
- Website: Wire Daisies' Myspace page

Wire Daisies were an English band from Cornwall, who were signed to EMI 'Angel' offshoot. The idea for the band was mooted in 1999 by three members of the group who had met at a party to mark the solar eclipse, however it was not until 2002 that the band finally took shape.

After recording a batch of material in a farmhouse in Cornwall, the band signed to digital record label Transistor Project, which was co-founded by Blur drummer Dave Rowntree. The band's female lead vocalist, Treana Morris, was 'discovered' by Roger Taylor of the rock band Queen, and their bassist Ol Beach is the son of Queen's manager Jim Beach. In 2006, the band joined Robbie Williams's tour to South Africa and performed alongside Robbie Williams and Freshlyground in Johannesburg, Durban and Cape Town.

After becoming a popular downloaded act, the band signed to EMI and re-issued their debut album, Just Another Day. In 2007, their second album, Wiredaisies, was released on the same label.

The band was featured in Three Men in More Than One Boat in which Cornwall native Rory McGrath and fellow comedians Griff Rhys Jones and Dara Ó Briain visited them while they were recording at the Sawmills Studio.

== Band members ==
- Treana Morris (lead vocals)
- Ol Beach (keyboards)
- Steve Jackson (drums)
- Alden Evans (lead guitar)

== Discography ==
=== Studio albums ===
- Just Another Day (2004)
- Wire Daisies (2007)

=== Singles ===
"Make Everything Change" (EP) from the album Just Another Day

- Released: July 2004
- Format: CD
- Label: Transistor Project
- Tracks: "Make Everything Change", "Truth That Hurts", "No More"

"The Great Outdoors" (Live from the Montreux Jazz Festival 2004) from the album Just Another Day

- Released: 23 November 2004
- Format: Download
- Label: Transistor Project
- Tracks: "The Great Outdoors (Live from the Montreux Jazz Festival 2004)"

"Everyman" (EP) from the album Just Another Day

- Released: 11 April 2005
- Format: Download
- Label: Transistor Project/Angel
- Tracks: "Everyman (Radio Edit)", "Leave Me Falling", "Everyman (Acoustic)"

"Truth That Hurts" (Radio Edit) from the album Just Another Day

- Released: 15 August 2005
- Format: Download
- Label: Transistor Project/Angel
- Tracks: "Truth That Hurts (Radio Edit)"

Mary Jane

- Released: 2006
- Format: CD
- Label: Transistor Project/Angel
- Tracks: "Mary Jane", "So Easy"

"Rocket Girl" (Radio Edit) from the album Wire Daisies

- Released: 2 April 2007
- Format: Download
- Label: Transistor Project/Angel
- Tracks: "Rocket Girl (Radio Edit)"

"Rocket Girl" from the album Wire Daisies

- Released: 3 April 2007
- Format: Download
- Label: Transistor Project/Angel
- Tracks: "Rocket Girl"

"Rocket Girl" (EP) from the album Wire Daisies

- Released: 7 May 2007
- Format: Download
- Label: Transistor Project/Angel
- Tracks: "Rocket Girl", "Mary Jane", "So Easy", "Rocket Girl (Live from Second Life)"
