= Modern Television =

Production Company

- Industry: Media
- Founded: 2005
- Headquarters: Cardiff, Wales and London, England
- Key people: Griff Rhys Jones
- Website: www.moderntv.co.uk

Modern Television is a British production company based in Cardiff and London. It was founded in 2005 by Griff Rhys Jones and Simon Mansfield, who left in 2011. Since 2011 the Managing Director has been Sarah Broughton. Tom Hollander was cast to play Dylan Thomas in the companies first drama production, A Poet in New York with Griff Rhys Jones acting as executive producer on the feature-length drama directed by Aisling Walsh Awards: The company won a Fast Growth 50 Award in 2009 and again in 2010. In 2012 it was listed in Televisual magazine as one of the top 100 production companies in the United Kingdom. A Great Welsh Adventure with Griff Rhys Jones won 'Best Presenter' at the BAFTA Cymru Awards 2014. A Poet in New York won 'Best Actor' for Tom Hollander at the RTS Awards 2015 as well as 'Best Feature’ and 'Best Special and Visual Effects’ at the BAFTA Cymru Awards 2015. The drama was also nominated for ‘Best Drama’ at the Broadcast Press Guild Awards, BAFTAs, Broadcast Awards, Celtic Media Awards and Critics’ Choice Television Awards in America in 2015. The company was dissolved on 22 February 2022.

== Productions ==
- Hidden Killers of the Post War Home
- Griff's Great Britain
- The Quizeum - 2 series
- A Great Welsh Adventure with Griff Rhys Jones
- Hidden Killers of the Tudor Home
- National Treasures of Wales with Griff Rhys Jones
- A Poet in New York
- A Great Welsh Adventure with Griff Rhys Jones
- New Hidden Killers: The Victorian Home
- New Hidden Killers: The Edwardian Home
- Burma, my Father and the Forgotten Army
- Hidden Killers of the Victorian Home
- Britain's Lost Routes with Griff Rhys Jones
- Hidden Treasures
- Rivers with Griff Rhys Jones
- Wilfred Owen: A Remembrance Tale
- Ian Fleming: Where Bond Began
- Greatest Cities of the World
- The Wind in the Willows with Griff Rhys Jones
- Charles Dickens and the Invention of Christmas
- The Prince's Welsh Village
- Terry Jones' Great Map Mystery
- Losing It
- A Pembrokeshire Farm
- Return to Pembrokeshire Farm
- The Heart of Thomas Hardy
- Monte Carlo or Bust
- Rudyard Kipling: A Remembrance Tale
- Why Poetry Matters
- Building Britain
