= Under the Thatch =

Under The Thatch
- Industry: Tourism
- Founded: 2001
- Founder: Greg Stevenson
- Headquarters: Wales
- Number of locations: 85
- Website: http://www.underthethatch.co.uk

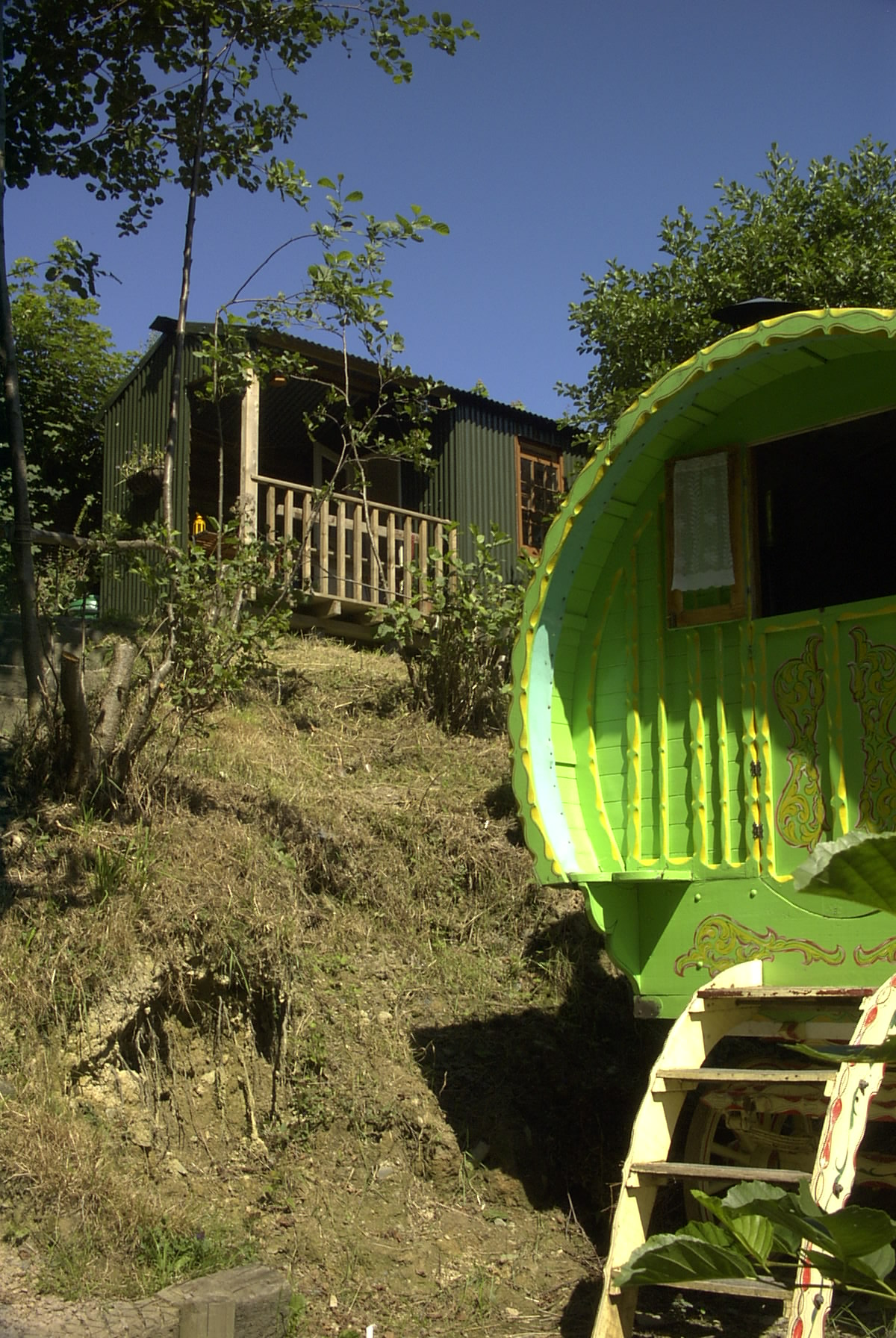
A romany caravan and cabin in Rhydlewis, rented out by Under the Thatch.

Under The Thatch is a holiday company run by Dr Greg Stevenson. Under The Thatch was established in 2001 so that Stevenson could find a use for a derelict cottage he had restored. Stevenson rents out properties he has restored or renovated to holiday makers. The majority of properties rented out through Under The Thatch are in the United Kingdom (Wales), with some in Ireland and France.

== History ==
The company was first established in 2001, with a single cottage, "Ffynnon Oer Isaf". Over the next few years, the company gradually gained more properties, usually derelict properties that were renovated to save them from demolition.

In 2006, one of the properties Under The Thatch now rents out to holiday makers, Trehilyn Uchaf, was the feature of a BBC Four series called "A Pembrokeshire Farm". The series featured Stevenson working alongside Griff Rhys Jones to renovate an old farmhouse that was severely derelict.

== Awards ==
Under The Thatch has been awarded a few awards, including,

- Winner - Guardian/Observer Ethical Travel Award 2007
- Best Tourism Business – Wales Sustainability Awards
- Best Environmental Business – Ceredigion Business Awards

Under The Thatch has also been named in many "best of" lists, including,

- Number 7 in The Guardians "15 Green Places to Stay" list in June 2007
- Bryn Eglur, a property rented out by Under The Thatch was named in The Guardians "Noughtie nights: the best UK hotels of the decade" list from December 2009.
- Number 15 in The Times "Fabulous 50: travel 2008, the best so far" list from October 2008
