= 27, Memory Lane =

- Film poster
- Directed by: Luke Hupton
- Starring: Jason Redshaw; Eileen Page; James Clay; Mario Babic; Charles O`Neill
- Cinematography: Ed Lambert
- Music by: Mark Daniel Dunett
- Production company: Lupton Films
- Release date: 26 April 2014 (United Kingdom)
- Country: United Kingdom
- Language: English

27, Memory Lane is a British romantic drama film, written and directed by Luke Hupton and starring Jason Redshaw, Diona Doherty, Eileen Page, James Clay and Charles O`Neill.

== Cast ==
- Eileen Page as Elise Babineau
- Samantha Mesagno as Keira Healy
- James Clay as August Pennyworth
- Mario Babic as Dr. Dijkstra
- Diona Doherty as Niam Healy
- Mark Tristan Eccles as Tom Shead
- Graham Cheedle as Frank Collingwood
- Alexander Wolfe as Tobias
- Dani Harrison as Page Healy
- Carolina Vella as Carie Winthrop-Pennyworth
- Lucas Smith as Henry Whistler
- Carole Bardsley as Tom`s mother
- Philip Svejnoha as August`s solicitor
- Sohe MacWhannel as Marion Pennyworth
- Brenda Catherall as Reverend
- Laura Marie Ring as Avril
- Sarah Burill as Verity
- Jason Redshaw as Burglar
- Pamela Taylor as Jude
- Dave Wake as Jason

=== Filming locations ===
Filming took place in Manchester, Lancashire, Cheshire and Cumbria, England.

== Release ==
The film premiered on 26 April 2014 in England.

As of March 2021, it is available to stream on Amazon Prime Video in the USA, Canada and UK.
