= Marlon Blue =

Austrian-born English actor, model, and musician (born 1988)

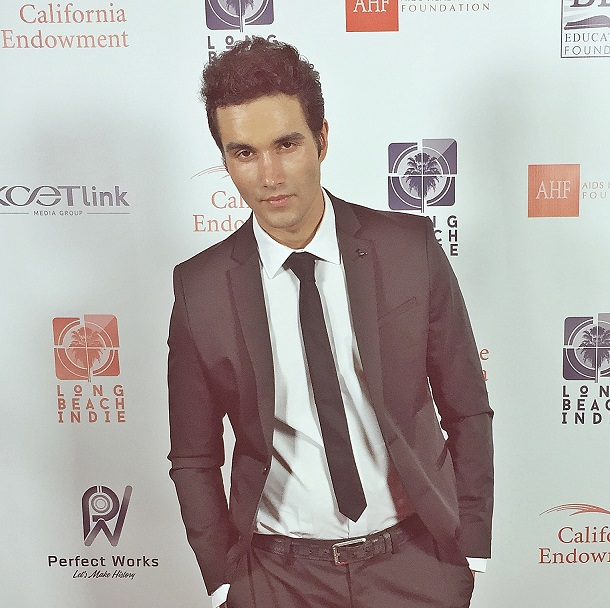
- Marlon Blue in 2017
- Born: Marlon Blue Babic; 19 May 1988 (age 38); Vienna, Austria
- Occupations: Actor, fashion model
- Years active: 2013–present

Marlon Blue Babic (born 19 May 1988) is an Austrian-born English actor and model. He has appeared in films such as Lion, The Royals, Episodes, Fury and Goitaca.

== Early life ==
Marlon Blue was born in Vienna, Austria.

== Career ==
Blue worked part-time as a craftsman in London when discovered by Ford Models and AD Model Management in Perth, Australia. He has modelled for brands such as Gareth Pugh, Chanel, Max Mara, GANT, Armani, Gucci, Marc Stone and Diesel. After several years on the runway he began studying at BAW's Studio in Paris and at Stella Adler`s Studio in New York City.

He participated in a poetic short film, created by Joseph Bleu and Fabien Montique, in memory of Marguerite Duras, released through the site frillr.com and later released a series of drawings through the book Lucielos.

2014, he received his first role in David Ayer`s Fury followed by appearances in TV series The Royals, Episodes and TV commercial Coco Mademoiselle directed by Joe Wright for Chanel French perfume.

2016, in published video game Guitar Hero Live from Neversoft Blue voiced Circle with The Black Keys . In 2015, he appeared in films such as Lion, Blue Rainbow, 27, Memory Lane, Fighting Heart, The Singleton, I'm Still Here, Dream a Life and The Luka State's music video "Rain". 2016, in Sylvie Verheyde's drama Sex Doll.

By June 2018, Blue had been cast as the protagonist, alongside Leandro Firmino, in Rodrigo Rodrigues's adventure drama Goitaca, with his character later specified as Candea. He attended filming in the jungle of Brazil after spending several weeks in the jungle of Ecuador amongst indigenous tribes near the Napo River.

In March 2021, he had been nominated as best lead actor for his portrayal as Candea in Goitaca alongside Jon Voight at the London International Film Festival during filming for The Himalayan Route.

By May 2023, Blue had been cast as the protagonist in biography drama Where There is Life There is Hope.

== Filmography ==
=== Film ===
Movies
Year	Title	Role	Notes
2013	I'm Still Here	Surgeon	
2014	Lion	Frank Stanford	
2014	27, Memory Lane	Doc	
2014	Fury	US Soldier	
2015	The Singleton	Kudos	
2016	Across the River	Noah	
2016	Sex Doll	Nat	
2016	Fighting Heart	Chris Coltweild	
2017	1603	John Quest	
2018	The Surrogate of Infidelity	Donovan	
2019	Ellipsism	Marlon	
2021	The Himalayan Route	Salt	
2023	Goitaca	Candea	
2024	Where There is Life There is Hope	Santo Cereser	

=== Television ===
Year	Film	Role	Notes
2015	The Royals	Cale	
2017	Episodes	Luc	

=== Theatre ===
Year	Film	Role	Notes
2013	Francisca	Robert	Principal

=== Commercial ===
Year	Film	Role	Notes
2014	Coco Mademoiselle	Himself	Chanel

=== Music ===
Video
Year	Single	Artist	Role	Notes
2014	Dream A Life	Slowly Rolling Camera	Principal	
2014	Rain	The Luka State	Principal	
2016	I Wonder	Bree	Principal	

=== Video games ===
Year	Title	Role	Notes
2015	Guitar Hero Live	Circle	Voice

== Awards and nominations ==
Year	Award	Category	Result	Work
2016	Los Angeles Film Awards	Actor	Won	Dark Waters
2016	Los Angeles Film Awards	Actor	Won	Dream a Life
2021	London International Film Festival Awards	Best Actor	Nominated	Goitaca
