= Rivers with Griff Rhys Jones =

- DVD cover
- Genre: Documentary
- Directed by: Ross Harper (Scotland); Jim Funnell (North); Kondrag Begg (West); Suzanne Phillips (The Lea); Jamie Murr (East)
- Presented by: Griff Rhys Jones
- Country of origin: United Kingdom
- Original language: English
- No. of series: 1
- No. of episodes: 5 (list of episodes)

Production
- Executive producers: Simon Mansfield; Clare Patterson; Ludo Graham
- Running time: 60 minutes
- Production company: Modern Television

Original release
- Network: BBC One
- Release: 27 July – 23 August 2009

Rivers with Griff Rhys Jones is a British documentary television series broadcast on BBC One in 2009. In this five-part series Griff, joined by his dog Cadbury, explores some of Britain's most well known rivers. It was created by Rhys Jones own production company Modern Television. Rivers was the top programme in its slot in terms of viewing figures reaching 4.7 million viewers. The programme was featured on the cover of the Radio Times.

== Episode list ==
No.	Title	Directed and produced by	Original release date
1	"Scotland"	Ross Harper	26 July 2009
2	"North"	Jim Funnell	2 August 2009
3	"West"	Konrad Begg	9 August 2009
4	"The Lea"	Suzanne Phillips	16 August 2009
5	"East"	Jamie Muir	23 August 2009
