= Rudyard Kipling: A Remembrance Tale =

2006 BBC documentary

Rudyard Kipling: A Remembrance Tale was a 1-hour 2006 BBC documentary on the life of Rudyard Kipling, particularly as relating to his loss of his son during the First World War. It was presented by Griff Rhys Jones and starred Peter Guinness as Kipling. It premiered on BBC One on Remembrance Sunday 2006.

It is one in a series of annual Remembrance Sunday documentaries, followed by Wilfred Owen: A Remembrance Tale (2007) and A Woman in Love and War: Vera Brittain (2008).
