= Mountain (TV series) =

- Series title card
- Genre: Documentary
- Presented by: Griff Rhys Jones
- Composer: Malcolm Lindsay
- Country of origin: United Kingdom
- Original language: English
- No. of episodes: 5

Production
- Executive producers: Richard Klein; Andrea Miller; Hamish Barbour
- Producer: Ian MacMillan
- Running time: 60 minutes
- Production companies: BBC Scotland; IWC Media Ltd.

Original release
- Network: BBC One
- Release: 29 July – 26 August 2007

Related
- Rivers with Griff Rhys Jones (2009)

Mountain is a British television series written and presented by Griff Rhys Jones that was originally broadcast 29 July – 26 August 2007 on BBC One.

The five programmes follow Rhys Jones as he traverses the mountains of Great Britain, from Wales to the Northern Highlands of Scotland. He also looks at the effect mountains have on the people who live near them, and vice versa. The series is an IWC Media production for BBC Scotland.

Part of a themed season by the BBC entitled 'Ultimate Outdoors', Mountain was produced by Ian MacMillan; the executive producers were Richard Klein and Andrea Miller (for the BBC), and Hamish Barbour (for IWC Media). The music was composed by Malcolm Lindsay.

== Background ==
When Griff Rhys Jones was invited to make the series, he was a mountaineering novice:

"Ten years ago I trudged up [Italian volcano] Stromboli in a hard hat; and seem to recall once taking a long walk in the Borders (it was hilly). But in the Suffolk/Essex pancake where I live, the highest visible phenomena grow from seeds. I'd never really seen the point of mountains at all."

The producers convinced him that part of the series' attraction would be his apparent lack of climbing skills. When Rhys Jones enquired what would happen if he couldn't master them, he was told, "That's good television."

However, when filming was complete, the presenter could "hardly credit" all that he had accomplished. During the course of the series, Rhys Jones had built a snow hole, climbed Ben Hope in blizzard conditions (guided by series consultant and mountaineer Cameron McNeish), and scaled (among others) Napes Needle and Catbells in the Lake District, Suilven, Scafell, Tryfan, Cairn Gorm, and Schiehallion. He had ascended a total of fifteen British mountains, some of them multiple times for the benefit of the cameras. His intention was to discover how the upland ranges that cover a third of Great Britain shaped its inhabitants, their culture and their history. Rhys Jones was assisted by experts on each particular region, together with mountain safety advisors, who were on hand throughout the making of the series.

The presenter came away with an appreciation of both the natural grandeur he had witnessed and the damage being done to it by tourism. Nevertheless, it was the lack of a human presence in the areas he visited that he found most beguiling:

"Despite people-pressure, I still found the moment when we left the path and pastures of the lower slopes to clamber up into the crazy, dislocated world of the peaks utterly compelling, because mountain landscape, above a certain height, is broken and crumbling, incredibly beautiful and largely deserted. It's a chaos of inspirational collapse. And it allows us, in this overcrowded island, to encounter real emptiness: a landscape offering little reassurance, one where the hand of man is completely absent."

=== Ben Nevis controversy ===
Despite a voice-over in the third program in which Rhys Jones is heard to say, "I've made it to the summit of Britain's highest mountain," he subsequently admitted that his ascent of Ben Nevis ended on the summit plateau, short of the actual peak by some 400 feet vertically and nearly a mile away. Poor visibility on the day of the climb was cited as causing the confusion despite the presence of several professional mountain guides with detailed local knowledge of the terrain. In acknowledging the error, Rhys Jones told The Telegraph, "I said we got to the summit but we didn't. I wish I'd looked at a map. I certainly never meant to deceive anybody. [...] I was very shocked to discover that actually we were in the wrong place."

== Programmes ==
=== 1. North West Highlands ===
Broadcast 29 July 2007, the first programme looks at Scotland's North West Highlands. Rhys Jones begins his exploration in Sutherland, only marginally more populated than the Sahara, and originally occupied by Viking settlers. He spends the night in village of Tongue, prior to a snowy ascent of Ben Hope the next day. Ben Hope is a Munro, a mountain over 3,000 feet in height (of which there are 282), named after Scottish mountaineer Hugh Munro. It is a popular hobby to attempt to climb them all. Rhys Jones then visits the nearby village of Skerra, and hitches a lift via the Royal Mail's post bus. He arrives at Loch Naver, a barren area that was once occupied but was emptied during the Highland Clearances, after which an estimated 150,000 people had been forcibly removed from their homes. However, there are still around 17,500 crofters, most of whom are tenants of landowners. Rhys Jones visits one who led the formation of a trust that eventually enabled 100 crofters to buy back 21,000 acres (85 km^{2}) of land. Suilven is the next peak to be climbed, but because of its remote location, Rhys Jones rests overnight in a bothy beforehand. The presenter then travels to the Isle of Skye, where he participates in a Céilidh before investigating the Cuillin, which have been put up for sale by their owner, the Clan MacLeod. Finally, Rhys Jones ascends Bruach na Frìthe, one of the principal summits on the Black Cuillin ridge.

=== 2. Lake District ===
Broadcast 5 August 2007, the second instalment features England's Lake District, which attracts 12 million visitors per year. Rhys Jones goes to Dove Cottage on the edge of Grasmere, home to William Wordsworth, whose poetry was inspired by the area. Hardknott Pass, 17 miles (27 km) south-west of Ullswater, is the steepest road in England. It includes a succession of hairpin bends and a 1 in 3 gradient, rising to 1,200 feet (370 m) in little over a mile, and Rhys Jones travels it riding pillion on a motorcycle. He then visits Honister Slate Mine, near Keswick. The stone circle at Swinside serves to illustrate the mysticism of the Lakes, and Rhys Jones attends a meeting of Quakers, whose founder, George Fox, preached from an outcrop on Firbank Fell. The presenter then follows Samuel Taylor Coleridge's perilous descent of Broad Stand, a series of sloping steps on Sca Fell. After discovering how the climber's fuel of choice, Kendal mint cake, is made, Rhys Jones then heads for a bookshop to examine the works of Alfred Wainwright, whose guide books about the region became best-sellers. The books are now being updated and Rhys Jones accompanies Chris Jesty, who is carrying out the revisions, on a journey to the top of Catbells. Finally, landscape photographer Gordon Stainforth sets out to recreate a shot taken in 1901 by mountain photography pioneers, the Abraham brothers. It involves Rhys Jones scaling Napes Needle, a pinnacle that abuts Great Gable.

=== 3. Central Highlands ===
Broadcast 12 August 2007, programme three concentrates on the Grampian Mountains, which include Britain's highest, Ben Nevis. Despite its great height, "pretty much anyone" can climb Ben Nevis because of its zigzag footpath; indeed, 100,000 people do every year and Rhys Jones attempts to run to the half-way point. He then drives through Glen Coe in order to gain some insight into how the mountains were "tamed" by George Wade's construction of roads. An island in Loch Leven contains graves of those who died in the Glen Coe Massacre and Rhys Jones visits it. The Caledonian Canal is featured, in particular Neptune's Staircase, a series of eight locks designed by Thomas Telford. Rhys Jones hails Scottish literature (especially Sir Walter Scott's Waverley) as the catalyst for tourism in the region, and the West Highland Line's run over the marshy Rannoch Moor is an example of Victorian engineering innovation. The presenter returns to Ben Nevis, and specifically the unforgiving north face. However, his climb is cut short by rising temperatures that may precipitate an avalanche. Aviemore, near the Cairngorms, is a tourist resort that was blighted by the unreliable weather, and Rhys Jones takes a ride on a dog sled there. On the Cairngorm plateau, he is helped to make a snow hole. Back at Ben Nevis, the presenter has "unfinished business". In rain and bad visibility, Rhys Jones is guided up a scrambling ascent of the ledge route, ending on the summit plateau.

=== 4. The Pennines ===
Broadcast 19 August 2007, the fourth instalment is devoted to the 'backbone of England', the Pennines. The range runs for 268 miles from the Derbyshire Peak District to the Scottish borders, and in order to traverse it, Rhys Jones procures a Volkswagen Transporter. The Yorkshire three peaks comprise Whernside, Ingleborough and Pen-y-ghent, and it is the latter that Rhys Jones climbs in the company of a group of trainee soldiers. The highest point in the Pennines is Cross Fell, and the presenter visits it in inclement weather to find a stream, the River Tees, which provides water for the area. Rhys Jones surveys the River Derwent from the air and highlights its formative role in Britain's Industrial Revolution. He then views a limestone pavement at Malham Cove, whose cliff wall allows him to practise the art of yodelling, before descending into the Derbyshire caves – specifically Giant's Hole. The packhorse trails enabled the transport of goods but Rhys Jones' attempt at riding the Pennine Bridleway is not entirely successful. He visits England's highest pub as it plays host to a latter-day War of the Roses in the form of a ladies' darts match between Lancashire and Yorkshire. Following a trip to Sheffield to relate its industrial history, Rhys Jones accompanies a group of students to scale Stanage Edge. Finally, the presenter participates in a recreation of the mass trespass of Kinder Scout, which eventually led to the right to roam being enshrined in British law.

=== 5. Snowdonia ===
Broadcast 26 August 2007, the final programme examines Snowdonia in Wales. Snowdon itself attracts 3/4 million visitors a year. 350,000 of them go there to reach the summit, and of these, 150,000 do so via the Snowdon Mountain Railway. The human presence has left its mark: Rhys Jones accompanies Robin Kevan, a retired social worker who collects Snowdon's litter. Also, many people choose the peak as a place to scatter the ashes of deceased loved ones. A mountain rescue team operates out of Llanberis, and Rhys Jones volunteers to be airlifted during one of its practice sessions. Near Llanfairfechan, the presenter accompanies a local farmer who rounds up ponies using quad bikes. Llyn Idwal is a lake area that was once covered by forest and scrub – but no longer, thanks to sheep. However, it does play host to alpine plants, and particularly those that also grow in the Arctic. In Dinorwic Quarry, Rhys Jones meets with Johnny Dawes to witness him scale a near-smooth, 70 feet (21 m)-high slate wall with apparent ease. The region's former slate industry is highlighted, and under the shadow of Cadair Idris, two entrepreneurs have set up a business in a former tool shed at a disused mine. They collect sheep droppings from the surrounding area and recycle them to make paper. Finally, Rhys Jones accompanies George Band, the youngest member of John Hunt's successful 1953 Mount Everest expedition (and now aged 77), on an ascent of Tryfan.

== DVD and book ==
A 2-disc DVD of the series was released on 3 September 2007, distributed by Warner Home Video.

An accompanying 256-page hardback book, Mountain: Exploring Britain's High Places by Griff Rhys Jones (ISBN 0718149890), was published by Michael Joseph Ltd on 26 July 2007.
