= Britain's Lost Routes with Griff Rhys Jones =

2012 British documentary television series

- Genre: Documentary
- Directed by: Michael Wadding (episode 1); Michael Davies (episode 2); Christopher Bruce (episodes 3 and 4)
- Presented by: Griff Rhys Jones
- Country of origin: United Kingdom
- Original language: English
- No. of series: 1
- No. of episodes: 4 (list of episodes)

Production
- Running time: 60 minutes
- Production company: Modern Television

Original release
- Network: BBC One
- Release: 31 May – 21 June 2012

Britain's Lost Routes with Griff Rhys Jones is a British documentary television series broadcast on BBC One. It is about the history of travel routes through Great Britain and is presented by Griff Rhys Jones. It was made by Griff Rhys Jones production company 'Modern Television'. Rhys Jones was nominated for the 'Presenter' BAFTA Cymru Award for his role in the series, while the cameraman Tudor Evans was nominated for 'Photography Factual'.

== Episode list ==
No.	Title	Director and producer	Original release date
1	"Royal Progress"	Michael Wadding	31 May 2012
2	"Thames Barge"	Michael Davies	7 June 2012
3	"Highland Cattle Drovers"	Christopher Bruce	14 June 2012
4	"Pilgrims"	Christopher Bruce	21 June 2012
