= Just Another Day (album) =

Studio album by Wire Daisies
- Released: 2005
- Recorded: 2004
- Genre: Rock
- Length: 53:21
- Label: I.D. Records
- Producer: John Cornfield

Wire Daisies chronology
Just Another Day (2005)	Wire Daisies (2007)

Just Another Day is the first album by the British rock group Wire Daisies. It was produced by John Cornfield, the owner of Sawmills Studios who has previously worked with Razorlight, Athlete and Supergrass.

== Track listing ==
No.	Title	Length
1.	"Make Everything Change"	4:02
2.	"Everyman"	4:45
3.	"No More"	3:55
4.	"Butterfly"	4:54
5.	"Truth That Hurts"	5:04
6.	"The Great Outdoors"	5:14
7.	"Just Another Day"	3:24
8.	"Billy Boy"	5:16
9.	"I'm Your Woman"	3:44
10.	"Come Winter Time"	8:29
11.	"Clearly Now"	4:34
