= Lion (2014 film) =

- Directed by: Simon P. Edwards
- Screenplay by: Simon P. Edwards
- Produced by: David Blood; Simon P. Edwards
- Starring: Ian Virgo; Nicola Posener; Jessica-Jane Stafford; Marlon Blue
- Cinematography: Tom Loyd
- Music by: James Rogers
- Production company: Kill The Sunset Pictures
- Release date: 16 August 2014 (United Kingdom)
- Country: United Kingdom
- Language: English

Lion is a British drama film, directed by Simon P. Edwards. The film stars Ian Virgo, Nicola Posener, Jessica-Jane Stafford and Marlon Blue.

== Cast ==
- Ian Virgo as Adam Westfield
- Nicola Posener as Miljiana
- Jessica-Jane Clement as Freya Westfield
- Marlon Blue as Frank Stanford
- Kaylee Rose as Sophie Westfield
- Mark Ivan Benfield as Bus Driver
- David Blood as Man at Zoo
- Danny Cotton as Man exiting the Bus
- Bruce Duthie as Office Worker
- Shane Finn as Man at Bus
- Felicity Kate Greef as Office Worker
- Jack W. Gregory as Man on Bus
- Nakita Harden as Women on Bus
- Sam Hoggarth as Man on Street
- Alexander Parnell as Jensen Matthews
- Lindy Pierri as Women at Bus Stop
- David Smith as Man on Bus
- Corinne Tuddenham-Trett as Office Worker
- Mark Adrian Ward as Man on Bus

=== Filming locations ===
Filming took place at Colchester Zoo, Colchester, Essex, England and in Norwich, Norfolk, England, UK.

== Release ==
The film was released on 16 August 2023.
