= Nadiya Ke Paar =

Nadiya Ke Paar (lit. 'Across the River' in Hindi) may refer to:

- Nadiya Ke Paar (1948 film), an Indian drama film by Kishore Sahu, starring Dilip Kumar and Kamini Kaushal
- Nadiya Ke Paar (1982 film), an Indian drama film by Govind Moonis, starring Sachin Pilgaonkar and Sadhana Singh

== See also ==
- Across the River (disambiguation)
