= Snip Nua =

Racing greyhound

- Species: Canis familiaris
- Breed: Greyhound
- Sex: Female
- Born: April 2008; Ireland
- Died: 14 December 2009; Harold's Cross Stadium, Dublin, Ireland
- Years active: 2008–2009
- Owners: Fior Gael syndicate, (members included comedian Dara Ó Briain)

Snip Nua was a racing greyhound who featured in the BBC television show Three Men go to Ireland.

== Biography ==
Born in the spring of 2008, Snip Nua was a racing greyhound who became famous because she featured in the BBC television show Three Men go to Ireland, which was broadcast over the Christmas holidays in December 2009. The show was eagerly anticipated in Ireland as it promised to provide good publicity for both Greyhound racing and Irish tourism, and was even referenced on the Irish tourist board website.

Due to its inclusion in the television programme, Snip Nua's performance at Mullingar Greyhound stadium in the Three Men Go to Ireland race was watched by an estimated 5-7 million people in the UK alone.

== Fior Gael syndicate ==
Snip Nua was owned by a 16-member syndicate, Fior Gael. In Ireland, syndication is a popular way of spreading the cost and responsibility of greyhound ownership. The Fior Gael syndicate was made up of a group of professionals and business people, among them barristers, lawyers, and journalists. Notable members of the syndicate included Frank McNally, business editor of The Irish Times, and comedian Dara Ó Briain. Ó Briain once described his membership of the syndicate as his worst financial investment.

He claimed that despite owning six dogs in seven years the syndicate had only had one win. At the time of the Three Men show, Snip Nua was the syndicate's latest dog. She appeared to be a promising racer who might break the syndicate's poor run of success, and in her first races, the young dog indeed put in some strong performances

== Death and legacy ==
Snip Nua's career as a professional racer was short; on 14 December 2009 she was euthanized after sustaining a hock injury at Harold's Cross Greyhound Stadium.

In May 2010, the Huddersfield Examiner ran a blog quoting Kevin McClements from the Irish Party for Animal Welfare, criticising the TV show's view of greyhound racing due to the dog's death.

== See also ==
- List of individual dogs
