= Three Men in a Boat (TV series) =

- Also known as: Three Men Go to...
- Starring: Dara Ó Briain; Rory McGrath; Griff Rhys Jones
- Country of origin: United Kingdom
- Original language: English
- No. of series: 7
- No. of episodes: 14

Production
- Running time: 60 minutes
- Production company: Liberty Bell Productions

Original release
- Network: BBC Two
- Release: 3 January 2006 – 28 December 2011

Three Men in a Boat is a television comedy/documentary series produced by Liberty Bell Productions for BBC Two starring Dara Ó Briain, Rory McGrath and Griff Rhys Jones, first shown on 3 January 2006. In this first rendition, the three participants rowed in a replica wooden skiff from Kingston upon Thames to Oxford.

The BBC subsequently commissioned and aired Three Men in Another Boat, Three Men in More Than One Boat, Three Men go to Ireland, Three Men go to Scotland; Three Men go to Venice, and Three Men go to New England, broadcast in 2008, 2009, 2009/2010, 2010 and 2011 respectively. Every series, bar the first, has featured the music from the Pirates of the Caribbean film series.

== Three Men in a Boat ==
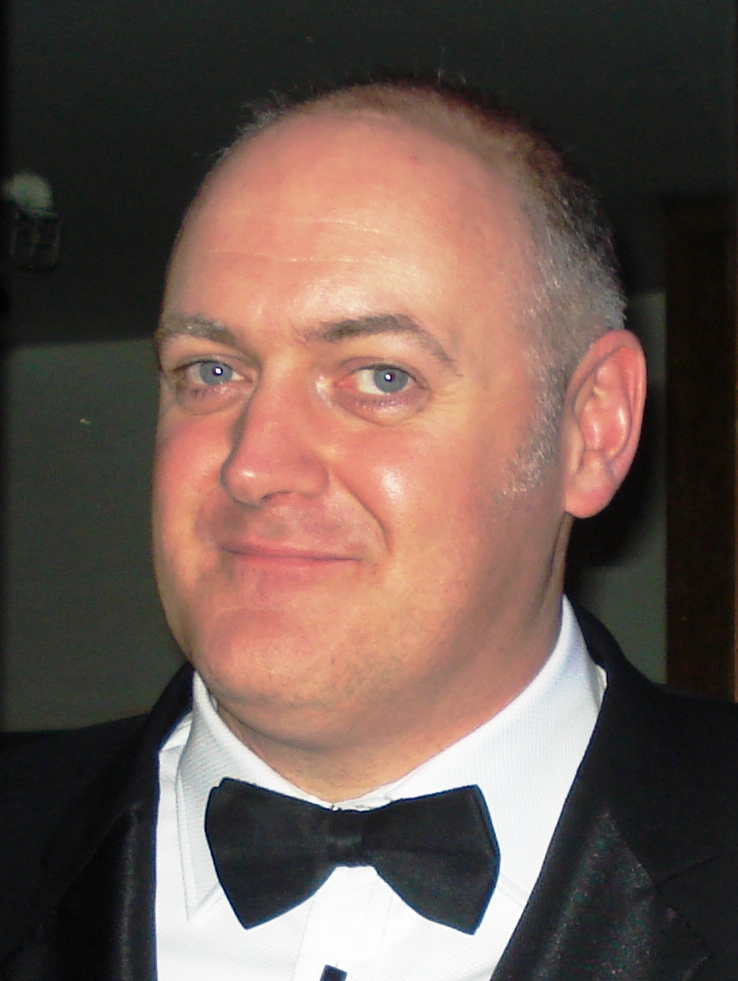
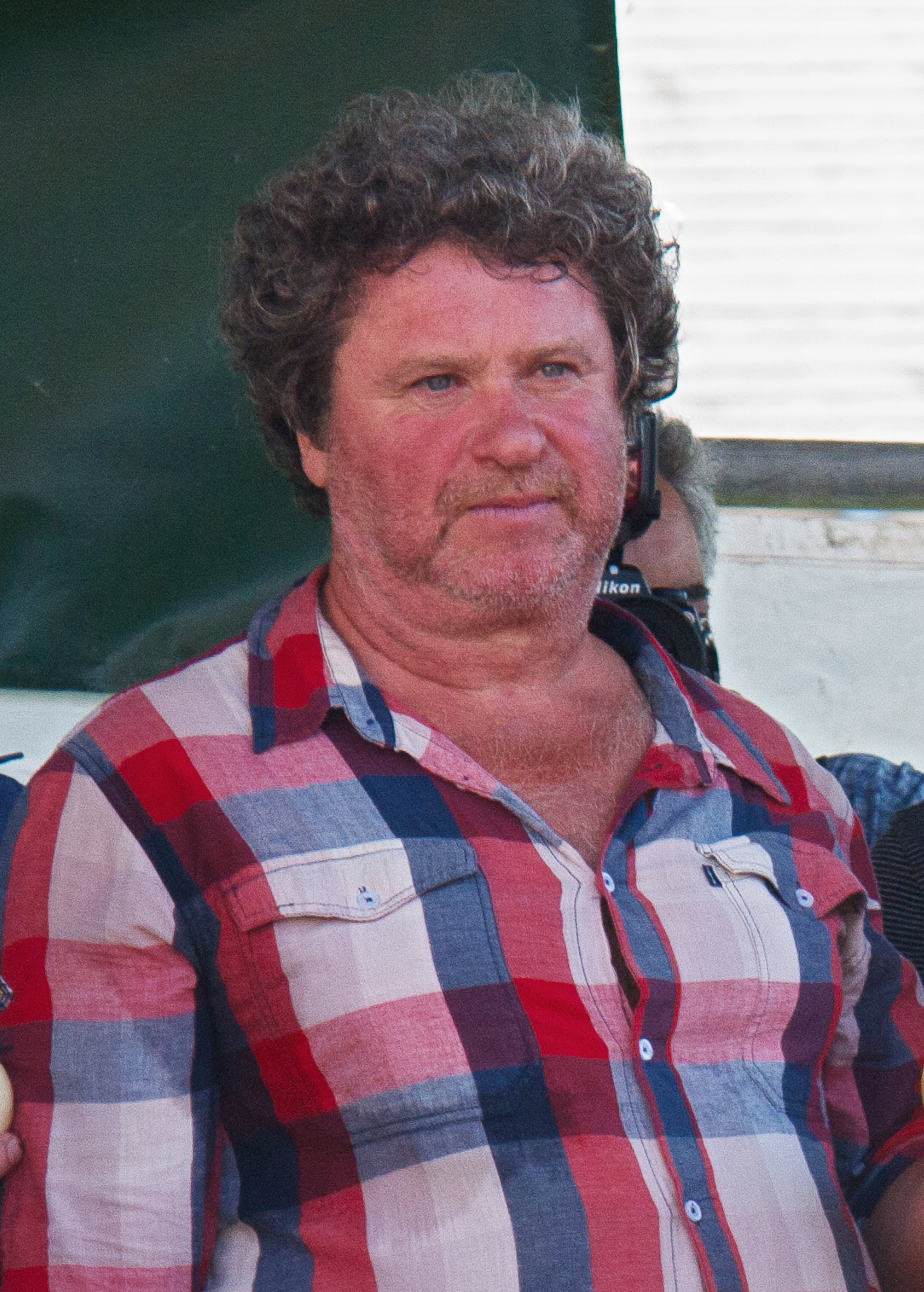
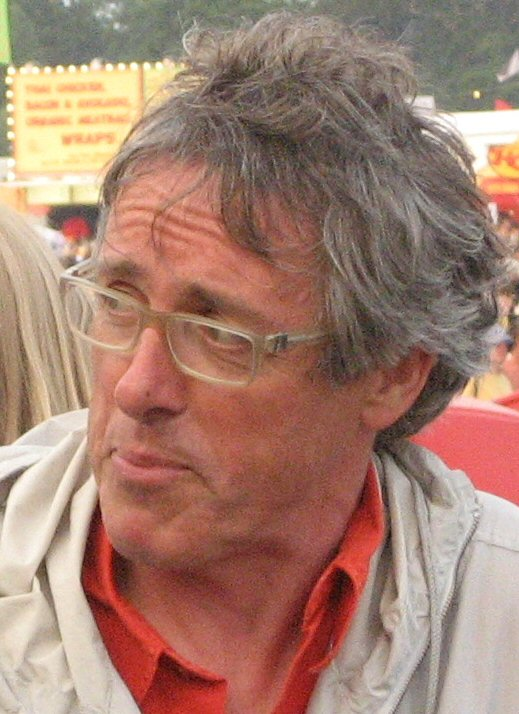
Dara Ó Briain (left), Rory McGrath (middle), and Griff Rhys Jones (right), the three participants in the adventures.

Produced by Andrew Fettis and Zoe Timmers.

Dara Ó Briain, Rory McGrath and Griff Rhys Jones take to the river Thames in their original recreation of Jerome K. Jerome's novel.

Embarking on a wooden skiff, a replica of that described in the original novel, the trio take it in turns to row and to steer the skiff along the Thames, from Kingston upon Thames to Oxford. Along the way they stop at or pass by locations mentioned in the novel and other historical and significant places, including Bisham Abbey, Boulter's Lock in Maidenhead, Henley-on-Thames, David Gilmour's Astoria recording studio at Tagg's Island, and Cliveden House. This series heavily used the soundtrack from the film Amélie.

=== Episode 1 ===
First broadcast on Tuesday 3 January 2006 at 21:00 – 3.83 million viewers

=== Episode 2 ===
First broadcast on Thursday 5 January 2006 at 21:00 – 2.60 million viewers

== Three Men in Another Boat ==
In their second adventure Griff Rhys Jones, Dara O'Briain and Rory McGrath are sailing from Tower Bridge to the Isle of Wight in Undina, the classic yacht owned by Rhys Jones. Dara and Rory having never sailed before, it is down to Griff to teach them how to sail in preparation for a race against Undina's sister yacht. They pass by the Isle of Sheppey, sail through the notorious Goodwin Sands, stop by Brighton and visit the Royal Navy's flagship HMS Ark Royal and the Spinnaker Tower while stopping at Portsmouth. This series heavily utilised the soundtrack from the films Apollo 13 and Chocolat.

=== Episode 1 ===
First broadcast on Tuesday 1 January 2008 at 20:00 – 3.80 million viewers

=== Episode 2 ===
First broadcast on Wednesday 2 January 2008 at 21:00 – 3.96 million viewers

== Three Men in More Than One Boat ==
In their third trip, the trio attempt to get from Plymouth to the Isles of Scilly using several boats. The soundtrack from the Harry Potter films was used in these episodes. Filming took place in October 2008.

=== Episode 1 ===
First broadcast on Thursday 1 January 2009 at 20:00 – 3.70 million viewers

Dara and Griff join Cornwall native Rory for a trip along the Cornish coast. Starting in Plymouth they are supposed to make their way to the Isles of Scilly. However they are hampered by Rory's lack of knowledge about boats in general leading them to borrowing and hitching a ride on various vessels from small rowing boats to a large tugboat as they make their way along the south coast. Along the way they crash into a harbour, play their part in the lobster repopulation, drop in at the Sawmills Studio during a Wire Daisies recording session, visit Pendennis Castle in Falmouth and investigate Cornwall's colourful maritime history at various landmarks.

=== Episode 2 ===
First broadcast on Monday 5 January 2009 at 21:00 – 3.22 million viewers village of Newlyn and find themselves on a number of vessels including an Open 60 high-speed yacht and a local fisherman's pilchard boat. As the winds pick up the trio struggle to find a ship capable of carrying them through the force 8 gale lying between them, the Scilly Isles and their final destination – the Bishop Rock Lighthouse. With their plans constantly interrupted by weather conditions the threesome are forced to entertain themselves; Rory takes Dara to visit his hometown Redruth while Griff explores the South Crofty and they take part in a training exercise with the RNLI Penlee volunteers and RNAS Culdrose helicopters. Griff contacts the captain of the THV Galatea in hopes of hitching a ride and while waiting for a reply, he and Rory find themselves participating in an amateur production of the musical Pirates of Penzance.

== Three Men go to Ireland ==
The fourth outing sees Dara, Griff and Rory take to the rivers and canals of Ireland, starting in Dublin and making their way to Limerick. The soundtrack from the Harry Potter films was used again in these episodes.

=== Episode 1 ===
First broadcast on Wednesday 30 December 2009 at 21:00 – 3.69 million viewers

Starting in Dublin the three make their way along the Grand Canal on board the last original Irish Guinness barge, hampered by the 80-year-old boat's lack of speed, troublesome engine and the canal locks that the trio have to endure. Dara takes Griff to see Trinity College's famous library and they engage in a debate at the University Philosophical Society. None of the trio can start the barge engine and decide take a shortcut along the Royal Canal with some help from an amphibious car. While in Mullingar they run into a street parade before making their way to see the greyhound Snip Nua race.

=== Episode 2 ===
First broadcast on Friday 1 January 2010 at 20:00 – 3.32 million viewers

Griff, Rory and Dara begin sailing down the River Shannon to Limerick. En route they stop by Ireland's most haunted castle, sail through Lough Derg on a surprisingly windless, sunny day, and navigate the Ardnacrusha power plant, the largest and deepest lock in Europe. In Limerick, Griff and Dara try their hand at power boat racing, Rory hosts a limerick competition and Griff gets up to mischief disguised as an old bus driver. The journey ends with a trip to the Aran Islands and the fort Dun Aengus.

== Three Men go to Scotland ==
Filming took place and was completed in late 2010 for a fifth series, which sees the trio make their way to Scotland. Griff, Rory and Dara attempt to recreate some of James Boswell and Samuel Johnson's journey through the Scottish Highlands and Islands as told in The Journal of a Tour to the Hebrides, albeit in the opposite direction. They start at the Clyde near Glasgow and try to make their way to the Isle of Harris in time for the fly fishing season. This was broadcast in the post-Christmas period, 2010.

=== Episode 1 ===
Broadcast on Monday 27 December 2010 at 20:00 – 3.46 million viewers

The trio hitch a ride on a seaplane to the end of the Crinan Canal where Griff and Dara help start the boiler of VIC32, one of the last coal-powered Clyde puffers still in operation. As the boiler would take another two days to heat sufficiently, the trio take a water taxi to the island of Jura and Oban and explore the locality and distilleries for which they are famous for. In between, they find themselves facing nature's fury in the notorious Corryvreckan whirlpool and take part in a local Highland games. Once the boiler was ready they sail up to Craobh Haven to take part in the West Highland Yachting Week races.

=== Episode 2 ===
Broadcast on Thursday 30 December 2010 at 20:00 – 2.98 million viewers

After a memorable yacht race, Griff, Dara and Rory start off from Oban, "gateway to the Highlands and Islands", to the Harris. En route, they stop by the Isle of Mull where they meet Sir Lachlan Maclean, chief of Clan MacLean, to learn more about the Scottish clans and then explore the seafood industry before heading to the Isle of Skye for some sightseeing at the Cuillin mountains and wilderness. Irish comedian Ed Byrne hitches a ride with the trio as he climbs the Munros.

== Three Men go to Venice ==
First broadcast on BBC Two at 21:00 on Tuesday 21 June 2011, the series consisted of two episodes in which the 'Three Men' go to Venice.

=== Episode 1 ===
Broadcast 21 June 2011 – 2.95 million viewers.

=== Episode 2 ===
Broadcast 28 June 2011 The trip ends in a race down the Grand Canal – 3.04 million viewers.

== Three Men go to New England ==
In late December 2011, BBC Two aired a seventh series of Three Men set across the Atlantic in New England, with the first episode airing at 21:00 on 27 December and the second airing the following day. The series followed the three men as they journey along the New England coast to join the birthday party flotilla celebrating the 125th anniversary of the Statue of Liberty. Part of this series was shot in Provincetown, Massachusetts, at the tip of Cape Cod.

=== Episode 1 ===
Broadcast 27 December 2011 – 2.23 million viewers.

=== Episode 2 ===
Broadcast 28 December 2011 – 2.35 million viewers.
