= Across the River (film) =

- Directed by: Warren B. Malone
- Screenplay by: Warren B. Malone; Russell Taylor; Simon Josiffe; Keir Charles; Elizabeth Healey
- Produced by: Jane Aprile; Jeannie Carla; Patte Griffith; Ben Hecking; Warren B. Malone; Yvonne Malone; Stella Ramsden; Chloe Thomas
- Starring: Elizabeth Healey; Keir Charles; Liz Richardson; Tomasz Alexander; Leon Ockenden; Gillian MacGregor; Marlon Blue; Rowena Perkins
- Cinematography: Leigh Alner; Fabrizio La; Palombara
- Music by: Andy Hopkins
- Production company: Penguins with Freckles
- Release date: 28 December 2016 (United Kingdom)
- Running time: 1h 15min
- Country: United Kingdom
- Language: English

Across the River is a British drama film directed by Warren B. Malone and starring Elizabeth Healey and Keir Charles.

== Cast ==
- Elizabeth Healey as Emma
- Keir Charles as Ryan
- Liz Richardson as Patte
- Tomasz Alexander as Smoker
- Leon Ockenden as Cake Shop Owner
- Gillian MacGregor as Joanna
- Marlon Blue as Noah
- Rowena Perkins as Pretty Girl
- Pippa Abrahams as Car Lady
- Steven Blake as Sand Sculptor
- Theo Kalliades as Dheli Employee
- Nick Lashbrook as Henry
- Drew P. as Sandy
- Harper Taylor as Georgie
- Tat Whalley as Simon

=== Filming locations ===
Filming took place in London, England, UK.

== Release ==
The film was released on 28 December 2016.
