= Griff Rhys Jones =

British actor and comedian (born 1953)

Griff Rhys Jones OBE
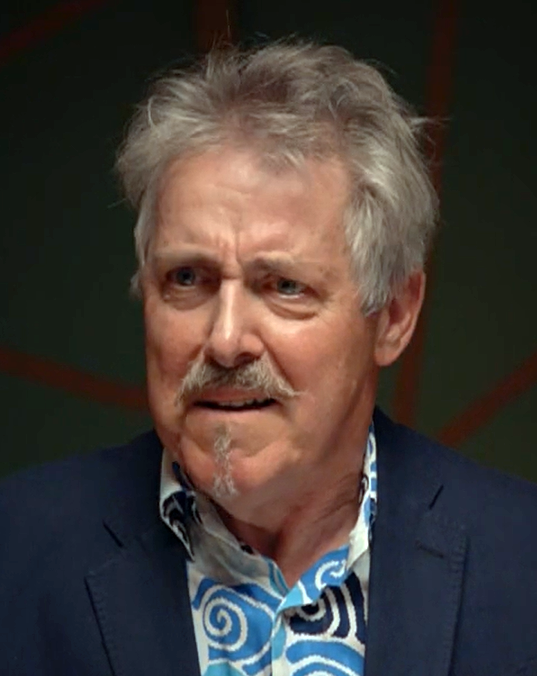
- Jones in 2019
- Born: Griffith Rhys Jones; 16 November 1953 (age 72); Cardiff, Wales
- Notable work: Not the Nine O'Clock News; Alas Smith and Jones
- Spouse: Jo Jones
- Children: 2

Comedy career
- Years active: 1979–present
- Medium: Film, television
- Genres: Improvisational comedy, sketch comedy

Griffith Rhys Jones OBE (born 16 November 1953) is a Welsh actor, comedian, writer and television presenter. He starred in a number of television series with his comedy partner, Mel Smith. He and Smith came to national attention in the 1980s for their work in the BBC television comedy sketch shows Not the Nine O'Clock News and Alas Smith and Jones.

From 2008 to 2018, Jones presented the television bloopers show It'll Be Alright on the Night for ITV, having replaced Denis Norden and being succeeded in 2018 by David Walliams.

== Early life and education ==
Griffith Rhys Jones was born on 16 November 1953 in Cardiff, the son of Gwynneth Margaret (née Jones) and Elwyn Rhys Jones, a medical doctor. He was six months old when his family moved to West Sussex owing to his father's occupation as a doctor. Jones attended Conifers Primary School in Midhurst, West Sussex, before his family moved to Epping, Essex. He attended a junior school in Epping, Essex, and Brentwood School, also in Essex.

After a short spell working as a petrol-pump attendant, Jones gained a gap year job on the P&O ship Uganda, working for a company organising school trips. In his autobiography, Semi-Detached, he describes how he was charged with helping to look after 600 Canadian schoolgirls, followed by a similar number of younger Scottish schoolchildren, and refers to the experience as being like "St Trinian's at sea". Jones initially read History, later changing to English, at Emmanuel College, Cambridge, graduating with a 2:1.

== Career ==
After Cambridge, Rhys Jones then joined BBC Radio Light Entertainment as a trainee producer, with his responsibilities including the satirical show Week Ending and Brain of Britain. He also appeared in 1974 in the Comedy series Oh no it isn't ! on BBC Radio 4.

Rhys Jones came in as a producer of Rowan Atkinson's show The Atkinson People with Frankie Howerd, Clive Anderson and Rory McGrath, for the BBC and appeared twice on Whose Line Is It Anyway?

Rhys Jones filled in several minor roles in the first series of Not the Nine O'Clock News, and was brought in as a regular cast member from the second series onwards, replacing Chris Langham. Rhys Jones says that the reason he got the part was not due to his appearance in the initial shows, or his talent, but because producer John Lloyd was dating his sister at the time.

Rhys Jones was awarded the Laurence Olivier Theatre Award in 1984 for Best Comedy Performance in Charley's Aunt and in 1994 for Best Comedy Performance for his performance in An Absolute Turkey. He also played Toad in The Wind in the Willows at the National Theatre in 1990, as well as several other theatre roles including Fagin in Oliver! at the Theatre Royal, Drury Lane and Harpagon in The Miser. at the Garrick Theatre. He provided the voices on the series of short cartoons Funnybones.

Rhys Jones has continued his acting career, being cast in Casualty and Agatha Christie's Marple as well as starring in Russell T Davies' drama series Mine All Mine on ITV. It'll Be Alright on the Night returned with Rhys Jones as the new presenter, taking over from Denis Norden. The first programme with Rhys Jones as host aired in 2008.

In January 2012, Rhys Jones returned to BBC sketch comedy The Ones alongside the likes of Hugh Bonneville, Tom Hollander and Larry Lamb, for one of a three-episode series in which comedy legends take to the stage for a mix of stand-up and sketches.

=== Partnership with Mel Smith ===
After Not the Nine O'Clock News, Mel Smith and Rhys Jones teamed up in 1984, and they appeared in the comedy sketch series Alas Smith and Jones. (the show's title being a pun on the American television series Alias Smith and Jones). After the first series, the two men appeared in Mike Hodges' science fiction comedy movie Morons from Outer Space. and then in 1989, the London Weekend Television production Wilt. Dressed as bobbies, in July 1985, Smith and Rhys Jones introduced Queen on stage at Live Aid.

Smith and Rhys Jones were reunited in March 2005, for a Comic Relief sketch,. which led to a revival of their previous television series in The Smith and Jones Sketchbook. Their final television appearance together was a Head To Head routine for the special of 2012 The One Griff Rhys-Jones.

With Smith, he co-founded the television production company Talkback Productions, now part of RTL Group and later in 2005, he established the production company Modern Television. When Smith died in the summer of 2013, Rhys Jones wrote a piece about his comedy partner in the Radio Times, saying it was "sheer bliss" to perform with Smith.

=== Production companies ===
In 1981, Rhys Jones along with Mel Smith founded Talkback, a production company which produced many British comedy series, including Smack the Pony, Da Ali G Show, I'm Alan Partridge, They Think It's All Over, QI and Big Train.

In 2005, Rhys Jones created his own production company Modern Television, which has since made several productions with Rhys Jones as presenter and executive producer.

In May 2014, Rhys Jones was executive producer on his production company's debut BBC drama A Poet in New York starring Tom Hollander as Dylan Thomas.

=== Documentaries ===
Rhys Jones has developed a career as a television presenter, beginning as the co-host on several Comic Relief programmes. He presented Bookworm from 1994 to 2000, was the presenter of the BBC's Restoration programme and has undertaken fundraising work for the Hackney Empire theatre conservation project.

Since 2006, Rhys Jones has appeared in the BBC's Three Men in a Boat series, alongside Dara Ó Briain and Rory McGrath. The series has included the trio rowing the River Thames, as in the 1889 novel, sailing from London to the Isle of Wight for a sailing boat race, borrowing numerous vessels to make their way from Plymouth to the Isles of Scilly.

In later adventures, the three men took to the Irish Canals and Rivers on a trip from Dublin to Limerick (Dara's Greyhound Snip Nua also tagged along for the trip), went to Scotland, and sailed along the Balkan coast ending up in Venice for a gondola race. His documentary series Mountain, for which he climbed 15 British peaks during 2006, was broadcast on BBC One 29 July–26 August 2007. Rhys Jones visited his mother's home town in Ferndale, Rhondda Cynon Taf for an episode of the BBC One series Who Do You Think You Are?, broadcast on 20 September 2007. In the episode, he detailed early memories and stories of his grandparents' fruit and vegetable shop on the high street and his mother's childhood concert performances at Trerhondda Chapel. He presented a documentary series with 5 episodes A Pembrokeshire Farm which was broadcast on BBC4 in July/August 2007. Two years later he presented another 5 episode documentary series Return to a Pembrokeshire Farm which was broadcast on BBC4 in September/ October 2009. Both series concerned the renovation of a farm in Pembrokeshire which Rhys Jones had purchased intending to restore them.

He presented a seasonal documentary, Charles Dickens and the Invention of Christmas, which was broadcast on 23 December 2007 on BBC One. Rhys Jones fronted Greatest Cities of the World, which saw him visiting a different city each week. The first series, featuring London, New York City and Paris, aired on primetime ITV in October 2008. A second series featuring Rome, Sydney and Hong Kong was broadcast in April and May 2010. Rhys Jones has created and presented programmes about Arthur Ransome, Thomas Hardy, John Betjeman and Rudyard Kipling.

During July to August 2009, Rhys Jones presented the BBC programme Rivers with Griff Rhys Jones. which featured on the cover of Radio Times.

In 2010, Rhys Jones presented a programme called The Prince's Welsh Village that featured Prince Charles.

In 2011 he presented the series Hidden Treasures of Art, which examined the art of Australia, India and Africa over the course of three episodes. Britain's Lost Routes with Griff Rhys Jones was broadcast on BBC One from 30 May to 20 June 2012. The show looked at lesser-known routes around Great Britain. On 29 April 2012, Rhys Jones guest presented an episode of Perspectives on ITV, his chosen subject being The Wind in the Willows.

In 2013 Rhys Jones presented a documentary about his father's service as a medical officer with the Gold Coast Regiment and Burma campaign in the Second World War, Burma, My Father and the Forgotten Army, was broadcast on BBC Two on 7 July.

In 2014 he fronted an eight-part ITV documentary series entitled A Great Welsh Adventure with Griff Rhys Jones.

From 10 April 2015, he introduced a five-part documentary series for ITV, Slow Train Through Africa, taking in life on and off trains from Morocco to South Africa, by way of Algeria, Tunisia, Kenya and Tanzania, Zambia, Zimbabwe and Namibia.

In December 2015, it was announced that Rhys Jones would present Griff's Great Britain, a new eight-part series for ITV.

From 2019, Rhys Jones started to present a number of travelogues for the ABC which were co-produced with various independent broadcasters around the world. Starting with Griff’s Great Kiwi Road Trip which was made by Perpetual Entertainment for broadcast on the ABC, Prime in New Zealand and ITV in the UK, it was followed by Griff's Great Australian Adventure, Griff's Great New Zealand Adventure and Griff's Canadian Adventure.

Unlike previous series, the 6-part series Griff's Canadian Adventure, which showed Rhys Jones travelling across Canada from Newfoundland to British Columbia. was picked up by Channel 4 for broadcast in August 2022 and was originally made for BBC First in Canada in association with the ABC, Channel 4 and The History Channel in New Zealand.

After a gap of three years, his latest Australian-produced travel show was announced in 2025 as Griff's Southern Charm and was broadcast by the ABC and Channel 4 under the title Griff's Great American South. Channel 4 also picked up the previous Perpetual Entertainment travel shows for a run on More4, with these 30 minute ITV shows re-edited into hour-long programmes.

=== Writing ===
Rhys Jones has written or co-written many of the programmes he has appeared in, and many spin-off books. In 2002, he began writing a book called To the Baltic with Bob, describing his adventures on the high seas with his sailing friend Bob, as they make their way to Saint Petersburg, port by port. The book was published in 2003, with Rhys Jones saying of the experience: "As a child, you go out and play and you lose all track of time and space. It's harder and harder to attain that blissful state of absorption as you get older. I did a six-month sailing trip to St Petersburg with some mates just to get it back."

His early life has been captured in his autobiography, Semi-Detached, published in 2006 by Penguin Books. His book to accompany the BBC One series Mountain was published in July 2007.

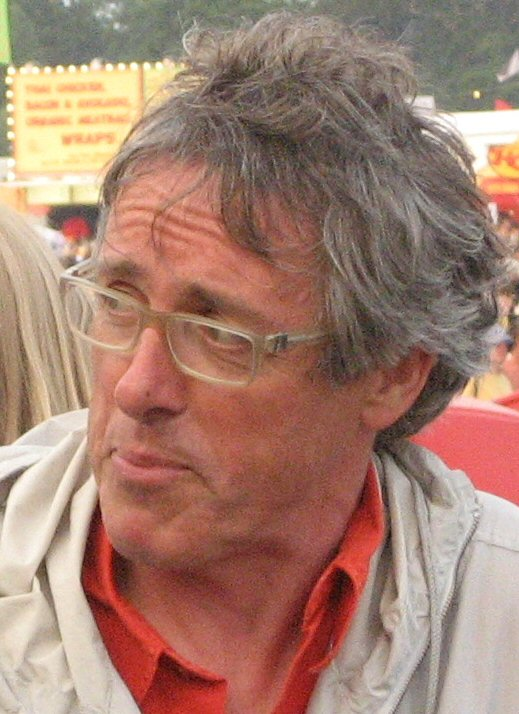
Rhys Jones in 2007

=== Other work ===
From 1999 to 2001, Rhys Jones featured in television adverts for the Vauxhall range of cars, as a "boffin". In April 2001, he was dismissed by Vauxhall, after an embarrassing advert for the Vauxhall VX220. He officially signed the deal in May 1999.

Rhys Jones provided the voice-over for Brentwood School's 450th anniversary DVD, reading a script written by fellow Old Brentwoodian Jonathan Ruffle.

Rhys Jones became President of The Victorian Society in February 2018, in succession to Asa Briggs, following a period as vice-president from 2009, and has participated in media campaigns for the society. Since 2007, he has been a Vice-President of the River Stour Trust, a registered charity led by volunteers who are dedicated to the restoration and conservation of the River Stour Navigation for the benefit and enjoyment of the public.

In June 2008, it was announced that Rhys Jones was to become the President of Civic Voice, the nationwide charity that campaigns for better places in the built and green environment.

In August 2014, Rhys Jones was one of 200 public figures who were signatories to a letter to The Guardian expressing their hope that Scotland would vote to remain part of the United Kingdom in September's referendum on that issue.

== Personal life ==
Rhys Jones met his wife, Jo, a graphic designer, while working at the BBC. He described their first meeting by saying: "The day we met, I was semi-naked and she was throwing water over me." The couple have two children.

Rhys Jones and his wife live between homes in London and Holbrook in Suffolk. He and Jo are keen gardeners, and he discussed their extensive garden in an October 2015 episode of Gardeners' World, part of which was filmed there.

Rhys Jones owned Undina, the 45-foot (14 m), fifty-year-old wooden sailing yacht which was used in Three Men in Another Boat; he spent £500,000 on her restoration and in 2013 stated she was for sale for £195,000, "probably less". Around 2011, he bought a 1948 57-foot (17 m) wooden yacht, Argyll, which he races at regattas, including the Fastnet Race.

A former heavy drinker, Rhys Jones is a teetotaller: "I don't drink so going to a party can become very tedious. By about 11 o'clock, everybody goes to another planet and you're not there with them, so I tend to avoid that sort of thing." He started running as a leisure pursuit in his early forties. In 2008, he presented two programmes called Losing It which were shown on BBC Two, in which he discussed his own problems with anger management.

An active conservationist, Rhys Jones is the president of Civic Voice, the national organisation representing Britain's civic societies. He also owns a small herd of alpacas.

A resident of East Anglia, Rhys Jones was awarded an honorary degree by the University of East Anglia in 2002.

He was awarded honorary degrees by the University of Glamorgan, the University of Essex and an honorary D.Litt from Anglia Ruskin University. He is also a Fellow of the Royal Welsh College of Music and Drama, the Royal Society of Arts, and an Honorary Fellow of his alma mater, Emmanuel College, Cambridge. In 2009 he was honoured by his father's former university, the University of Wales College of Medicine (now part of Cardiff University).

Rhys Jones was appointed Officer of the Order of the British Empire (OBE) in the 2019 Birthday Honours for services to the National Civic Society Movement, charity and entertainment.

== Filmography ==
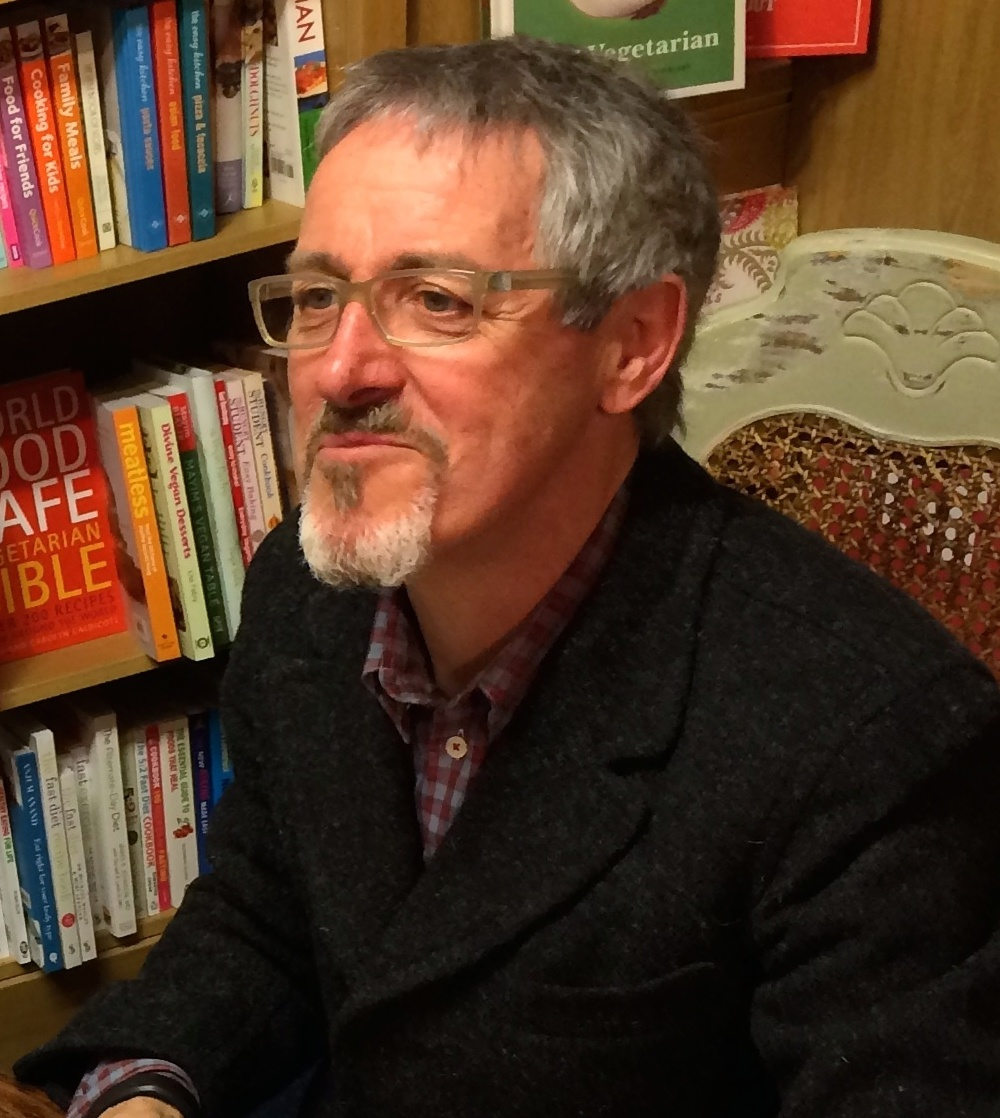
Rhys Jones in 2014

=== Film ===
Year	Title	Role	Notes
1983	Two Foolish Men	(unknown)	Short film
1985	Morons from Outer Space	Graham Sweetley	Also co-writer
1989	Wilt	Henry Wilt	
1992	As You Like It	Touchstone	
1994	Staggered	Graham	
1996	The Adventures of Pinocchio	Tino	
1998	Up 'n' Under	Ray Mason, Radio York Commentator	
2000	The Testimony of Taliesin Jones	Principal Caesar	
2002	Puckoon	Col. Stokes	
2016	Love Somehow	Dylan Thomas (voice)	Short film
2020	What a Carve Up!	John Stephens	
2022	Future TX	The Foley Brothers	

=== Television ===
Year	Title	Role	Notes
1974	Cambridge University 1974 Footlights Revue	Various characters	Television film. Also co-writer
1977	The 1977 Cambridge Footlights Review	–	Television film. Director: Footlights & co-writer
1979–1982	Not the Nine O'Clock News	Various characters	Series 1–4; 27 episodes. Also co-writer
1982	The Funny Side of Christmas	Trevor	Television film. Also co-writer
1984	The Young Ones	Bambi, Host of University Challenge	Episode: "Bambi"
1984	Weekend Playhouse	Michael	Episode: "Singles Weekend"
1984–1988	Alas Smith and Jones	Various characters	Series 1–4; 28 episodes. Also co-writer (10 episodes)
1985–1991	Jackanory	Storyteller	5 episodes
1987	Porterhouse Blue	Cornelius Carrington	2 episodes
1987	The Grand Knockout Tournament	Himself - Team 3 Member	Television Special
1987–1988	The World According to Smith and Jones	Griff	Series 1 & 2; 12 episodes. Also co-writer
1988	Jake's Journey	Innkeeper	Television film (pilot)
1989	The Play on One	Harry Clark	Episode: "A View of Harry Clark"
1989	Smith and Jones in Small Doses	Various characters	4 episodes. Also co-writer (1 episode)
1989–1998	Smith and Jones	Various characters	Series 5–10; 36 episodes. Also co-writer (3 episodes)
1991	Screen One	Patrick	Episode: "Ex"
1992	Tales from the Poop Deck	Narrator	6 episodes
1992	Funnybones	All voices	12 episodes
1993	Demob	Ian Deasey	6 episodes
1993	Q.E.D.	Himself - Narrator	Episode: "Knights of the Shining Piddock"
1994–1995	Monty the Dog	Narrator / All voices	13 episodes
1994–1999	The Bookworm	Himself - Presenter	Series 1–6; 42 episodes
1995	Sardines	Davy Kotowski	Television film
1998	Jack and the Beanstalk	Baron Wasteland	Television film
1998	Crystal Balls	Himself - Presenter	Television film
1999	Jonathan Creek	Jeremy Sangster	Episode: "The Curious Tale of Mr. Spearfish"
2000	Aladdin	Emperor	Television film
2000	The League of Gentlemen: Behind the Scenes	Himself - Narrator	Television film
2002	Casualty	Paul Fuller	Episode: "Too Close for Comfort"
2003–2009	Restoration	Himself - Presenter	Series 1–3; 26 episodes
2004	Monkey Trousers	Various characters	Television film (pilot)
2004	Three Ivans, Two Aunts and an Overcoat	Ivan	6 episodes
2004	Mine All Mine	Max Vivaldi	5 episodes
2004	Agatha Christie's Marple	Dr. Quimper	Episode: "4:50 from Paddington"
2005	Monkey Trousers	Various characters	2 episodes
2005	Riot at the Rite	Gabriel Astruc	Television film
2005	Going to Work Naked	Himself - Narrator	Television film
2005	The Secret Life of Arthur Ransome	Himself - Narrator	Television film. Also co-writer
2006	The Smith and Jones Sketchbook	Various characters	6 episodes. Also co-writer
2006	Betjeman and Me: Griff Rhys Jones	Himself - Presenter	Television film
2006	Rudyard Kipling: A Remembrance Tale	Himself - Presenter	Television film
2006–2011	Three Men in a Boat	Himself	with Dara Ó Briain & Rory McGrath. Series 1–7; 14 episodes
2007	Mountain	Himself - Presenter	5 episodes
2007	A Pembrokeshire Farm	Himself - Presenter	5 episodes
2007	Charles Dickens & the Invention of Christmas	Himself - Presenter	Television film. Also writer & executive producer
2007	Mouse: A Secret Life	Himself - Narrator	Television film
2008	The Heart of Thomas Hardy	Himself - Narrator	Television film
2008	Auntie's War on Smut	Himself - Presenter	Television film
2008	Losing It: Griff Rhys Jones on Anger	Himself - Presenter	Television film. Also writer
2008–2010	Greatest Cities of the World	Himself - Presenter	Series 1 & 2; 6 episodes. Also writer; exec. producer (1 episode)
2008–2016	It'll Be Alright on the Night	Himself - Presenter	11 episodes
2009	Rivers with Griff Rhys Jones	Himself - Presenter	5 episodes
2009	Return to a Pembrokeshire Farm	Himself - Presenter	5 episodes
2010	The Prince's Welsh Village	Himself - Presenter	Television film
2011	Hidden Treasures of...	Himself - Presenter	Mini-series; 3 episodes
2012	Perspectives	Himself - Presenter	Episode: "Griff Rhys Jones: Wind in the Willows"
2012	Britain's Lost Routes with Griff Rhys Jones	Himself - Presenter	Mini-series; 4 episodes
2012	A Short History of Everything Else	Himself - Presenter	6 episodes. Also co-writer
2013	Burma, My Father and the Forgotten Army	Himself - Presenter	Television film
2014	Under Milk Wood	(voice)	Television film
2014	A Great Welsh Adventure with Griff Rhys Jones	Himself - Presenter	8 episodes. Also executive producer (5 episodes)
2014	National Treasures of Wales	Himself - Presenter	4 episodes
2015	Quizeum	Himself - Presenter	Television film. Also writer
2015	Slow Train Through Africa	Himself - Presenter	Mini-series; 4 episodes
2016	Ordinary Lies	Patrick	Episode: "Fletch"
2016	Griff's Great Britain	Himself - Presenter	8 episodes. Also executive producer (2 episodes)
2017	Murder on the Blackpool Express	David	Television film
2019	Midsomer Murders	Ambrose Deddington	Episode: "The Sting of Death"
2019	Griff's Great Kiwi Road Trip	Himself - Presenter	4 episodes
2020	Griff’s Great Australian Adventure	Himself - Presenter	6 episodes. Also executive producer (1 episode)
2021	Griff’s Great New Zealand Adventure	Himself - Presenter	4 episodes
2022	Griff's Canadian Adventure	Himself - Presenter	6 episodes
2022	Gangsta Granny Strikes Again!	Mr. Parker	Television film
2025	Griff's Great American South	Himself - Presenter	6 episodes
2026	Richard Osman's House of Games	Himself - Contestant	Series 9; 5 episodes (Week 14)
2026	Griff Across the Alps	Himself - Presenter	6 episodes

=== Video games ===
Year	Title	Role	Notes
1996	The Adventures of Pinocchio	Tino (voice)	

=== Theatre ===
1990 – Alan Bennett's adaptation of The Wind in the Willows, as Mr Toad - (National Theatre)

2026 – I'm Sorry Prime Minister, as Jim Hacker - (Apollo Theatre)

Preceded by Simon Levene	Footlights Vice-President; 1975–1976	Succeeded by Nicholas Hytner
