= Leandro Firmino =

Brazilian actor (born 1978)

- Born: Leandro Firmino da Hora; June 23, 1978 (age 47); Rio de Janeiro, Brazil
- Years active: 2002-present

Leandro Firmino da Hora (born June 23, 1978) is a Brazilian actor. He is best known for his role as drug lord Li'l Zé in the Academy Award nominated film City of God. He also had a main role in one episode of spin-off series City of Men. He played the role of Thiago in Trash with Wagner Moura and Rooney Mara. Firmino starred as Goitaca Chief in Rodrigo Rodrigues`s Goitaca with Marlon Blue and Lady Francisco. He was cast as Gilmar in Impuros with Rui Ricardo Dias and Cyria Coentro.

== Filmography ==
- 2002 – City of God – "Li'l Zé"
- 2002 – Mauzinha
- 2003 – O Corneteiro Lopes
- 2005 – Cafundó – Cirino
- 2006 – Trair e Coçar É só Começar – Mechanic
- 2007 – O Homem Que Desafiou o Diabo – Zé Pretinho
- 2012 – As Aventuras de Agamenon, o Repórter
- 2012 – City of God - 10 Years Later – Himself
- 2012 – No Olho da Rua
- 2012 – Totalmente Inocentes – Algodão
- 2014 – Julio Sumiu
- 2014 – Trash
- 2021 – Goitaca
- 2025 – Vale Tudo – Jarbas Galhardo

== Selected television ==
- 2015-2018 – Magnifica 70
- 2018-2020 – Impuros
- 2019 – Órfãos da Terra
- 2022 - El Presidente: The Corruption Game
- 2025 - Vale Tudo

== Awards and nominations ==
| Year | Award | Category | Result | Work |
|---|---|---|---|---|
| 2002 | Havana Film Festival | Best Actor | Won | City of God |
| 2002 | Premio Qualidade | Best Actor | Won | City of God |
| 2003 | Premio Guarani | Best Actor | Nominated | City of God |
| 2003 | Cinema Brazil Grand Prize | Best Actor | Nominated | City of God |
| 2021 | Buenos Aires International Film Festival Awards | Best Supporting Actor | Won | Goitaca |
