= Shane Hart =

British actor, screenwriter and casting director

- Occupations: Actor, producer
- Years active: 2011–present
- Height: 1.75 m (5 ft 9 in)

Shane Hart is a British actor and producer. He appeared in World War Z (2013), Jack Ryan: Shadow Recruit (2014) and Hummingbird (2014). He played the role of The Guvnor in British Gangster Movie Gatwick Gangsters (2014), Jeremiah in The Singleton (2015), Elmer Spore in Witch (2015), Andrew Carter, Aryan's Lawyer, in feature film 1603 (2015), PC Pepper in Golden Years (2015), Richardson Heavy in Legend (2015), is confirmed to join the cast of Adam Jones (2015), has been announced to play the lead role of Eddie Ward in the upcoming action film The Levellers (2015) and can be seen as Albert Anastasia in Mafia´s Greatest Hits.

== Career ==
In 2014, he joined the cast of Closed Circuit (2014), starring Eric Bana as well as The Anomaly (2014), starring Noel Clarke. The same year, he has performed in and was involved with many mainstream television Channel Productions such as The Politicians Husband and Broadchurch, both starring David Tennant, Crimewatch & C&I CHANNEL real life crime investigations, Talking to the Dead, The Royals, starring Elizabeth Hurley, 24:Live Another Day with Kiefer Sutherland, Humans, A Poet in New York and Lewis. Also in 2014, Hart was chosen for the role of Mr. Windsor in Coolio – Time Travel Gangster (2014), Andrew Carter in 1603 (2015), alongside Danny Darren, Bent's Crispian Belfrage and Rachel Marquez, a Disciple in Londinium (2015), as Jeremiah in The Singleton (2015) as well as additional roles in A Fistful of Bullets (2016), starring War Horse`s Geoff Bell, PC Pepper in Golden Years (2015) alongside Titanic's Bernard Hill, Una Stubbs and Virginia McKenna, the role of Elmer Spore in feature film Witch (2015), A police officer in Honeytrap (2015), the UK Prime Minister in Star Gods of Terra (2015), The Guvnor in Gatwick Gangsters (2015) and appeared in Nollywood film International Games (2015). In late 2014, Hart's script for his own movie The Levellers entered pre-production, which is set to also feature Brian Croucher. In January 2015, Hart was announced to play the role of a Richardson Heavy in Legend (2015), starring Tom Hardy. In 2017, Hart has been announced to direct an eight part series Blame (2017) and upcoming motion picture Palatable. In 2018, Hart teamed up with Lionhawk Picture´s producer Pamala Hall, together with Hart´s Hartfelt Media Film Productions, to collaborate towards a movie adaption for Desuba-On Reflection.

== Filmography ==
=== Film ===
Movies
Year	Title	Role	Notes
2013	The Fall of the Essex Boys	Hooligan	
2013	Black Mirror	Spectator	
2013	The Mimic	Drinker	
2013	Redemption	Meat Market Trader	
2013	The Politician's Husband	Civil Servant	
2013	World War Z	Lt Matthews	
2013	Teenage Kicks	Paul's Dad	
2013	Diana	Security	
2013	One Chance	Orchestra	
2013	Vendetta	News	
2013	No Cover	Seizl	
2014	Jack Ryan: Shadow Recruit	Russian Businessman	
2014	He Who Dares	Sergeant Briggs	
2014	A Poet in New York	Audien	
2014	Dangerous Mind of a Hooligan	Banks	
2014	The Hooligan Factory	Prison Officer	
2014	Anomaly	Futuristic NYPD	
2014	C.O.O.L.I.O	Mr. Windsor	
2014	London Scally	Shamus	
2014	London Hood	Gambling Gangster	
2014	He Who Dares – Downing Street Siege	Secret Service Agent	
2014	The Lost Honour of Christopher Jeffries	Custody Officer	
2015	Humans	Armed Police	
2015	The Royals	Paparazzi	
2015	A Vampire Story	Dave	
2015	Legend	Richardson Heavy	
2015	Tag	DI. Daniels	
2015	The Singleton	Jeremiah	
2015	Londinium	Disciple	
2015	The Levellers	Eddie Ward	
2015	Golden Years	PC Pepper	
2015	Burnt	Priso	
2016	Star Gods of Terra	Prime Minister	
2017	Mafia´s Greatest Hits	Albert Anastasia	
2017	Household	Father	
2017	Gatwick Gangsters	The Guvnor	
2017	Kill or be Killed	DI. Daniels	
2017	Blame	The Nark	
2017	1603	Andrew Carter – Ayran's Lawyer	
2018	Witch	Elmer Spore	
2018	Final Score	Seargent Smith	
2018	Made Ordinary	Senator Higgins	
