= Wilfred Owen: A Remembrance Tale =

TV documentary

- Genre: Documentary
- Directed by: Louise Hooper
- Presented by: Jeremy Paxman
- Country of origin: United Kingdom
- Original language: English
- No. of episodes: 1

Production
- Running time: 59 minutes
- Production company: Modern Television

Original release
- Network: BBC One
- Release: 11 November 2007

Wilfred Owen: A Remembrance Tale was a 1-hour 2007 BBC documentary on the life of the First World War poet Wilfred Owen. It was presented by Jeremy Paxman and starred Samuel Barnett as Owen and Deborah Findlay as his mother Susan. It premiered on BBC One on Remembrance Sunday 2007.
