= A Poet in New York =

- Genre: Drama
- Based on: Dylan Thomas
- Written by: Andrew Davies
- Directed by: Aisling Walsh
- Starring: Tom Hollander; Ewen Bremner; Essie Davis; Phoebe Fox
- Theme music composer: Debbie Wiseman
- Country of origin: United Kingdom
- Original language: English

Production
- Producer: Ruth Caleb
- Cinematography: Martin Fuhrer
- Running time: 60 minutes (BBC One Wales); 75 minutes (BBC Two)
- Production company: Modern Television

Original release
- Network: BBC One Wales; BBC Two
- Release: 30 April 2014

A Poet in New York is a British drama television film that was first broadcast, in a 60-minute version, by BBC One Wales on 30 April 2014. A longer 75-minute version was later broadcast by BBC Two on 18 May 2014. The film, written by Andrew Davies and directed by Aisling Walsh, explores how Welsh poet Dylan Thomas died in New York at the age of 39. The film was made to mark the centenary of Thomas' birth on 27 October 1914.

== Cast ==
- Tom Hollander as Dylan Thomas
- Essie Davis as Caitlin Thomas
- Ewen Bremner as John Malcolm Brinnin
- Phoebe Fox as Liz Reitell
- Samantha Coughlan as Sylvie
- Stuart Matthews as Theatre Stagehand
- Shane Hart as Audience
- Morfydd Clark as Nancy Wickwire
- Lucinda O'Donnell as Brazell
- Aimee-Ffion Edwards as Marianne
- Nansi Rhys Adams as Aeronwy Thomas

== Production ==
A Poet in New York was commissioned for the BBC by Janice Hadlow, Ben Stephenson, Adrian Davies and Faith Penhale. The executive producers were Griff Rhys Jones, Rob Warr, Faith Penhale and Bethan Jones. Filming took place in Cardiff and Laugharne over 18 days. Tom Hollander put on two stone in weight to play the role.

== Reception ==
Thomas expert George Tremlett did not understand why the BBC had chosen to commemorate the centenary of the poet's birth by making a film about his death.

In The Guardian Stuart Jeffries wrote: "Hollander and Essie Davis as Caitlin performed well youthful concupiscence gone sour." Ceri Radford, in The Daily Telegraph said: "[Hollander] made a startlingly good Thomas, while the script came from one of the few writers who could hope to do the poet justice." and "This was tragedy in the Shakespearean sense: a great man undone by one fatal weakness. ... The production was lush, lyrical and very, very funny." In Financial Times, Antonia Quirke wrote: "We see so many performances based on real people ... actors faced with the gnarled question of whether to impersonate or interpret. ... Tom Hollander gives a performance finely balanced between the two approaches: terrific mimicry, but unpredictable and subtle.".
