= The Luka State =

Rock band from Winsford, Cheshire, England

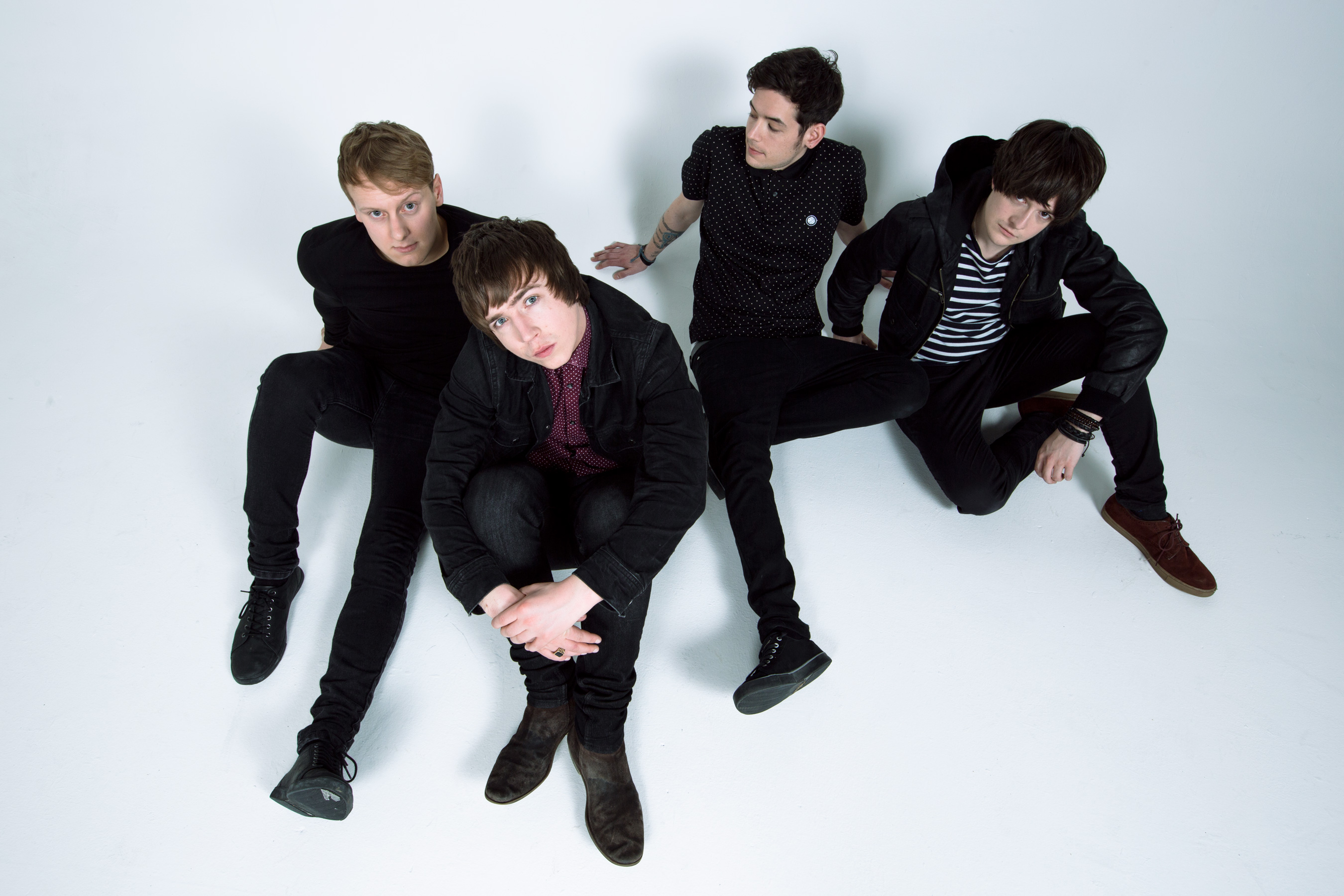
- Photographed by Jono Terry

Background information
- Origin: Winsford, England
- Genres: Rock and roll, indie rock, alternative rock
- Years active: 2013–2026
- Labels: Thirty Tigers; Shelter Music / BMG; AntiFragile; Project Records
- Members: Conrad Ellis; Sam Bell; Jake Barnabas; Lewis Pusey
- Website: http://www.thelukastate.com/

The Luka State are an English indie rock band from Winsford, Cheshire, England. It comprises members Conrad Ellis, Sam Bell, Jake Barnabas, and Lewis Pusey. The band are signed to Thirty Tigers [Worldwide].

== Career ==
They were formed in 2012 by Conrad Ellis (guitarist), Sam Bell (bass) and Jess Whitmore (drums) as a three-piece.

In 2013, the band released three singles: "Matter of Time," "30 Minute Break," and "Rain;" all three being recorded by Sam Williams, best known for discovering alternative rock band Supergrass. They were picked up by Vulture Hound, which called the group "the epitome of modern Rock-n-roll."

In 2014, Whitmore parted with founding members Ellis and Bell, the latter citing musical differences and leaving room for Jake Barnabas as drummer. This change coincided with a change to a more electronically enhanced sound, described by Clash as "all epic guitars and contagious synth lines".

The band were invited on tour with One Night Only in 2015 and so the band expanded, with guitarist Lewis Pusey joining January of that year. His first performance with the band was on set in London at the recording of The Believer music video.

Then, in November 2015, they release the EP "The Price of Education" with 7 songs (including The Believer, Can't Help Myself and Bring This All Together)

In 2016, The Luka State recorded 4 demos: "Lies! Lies! Lies! - Demo", "Never Gonna Come Back - Demo", "Over and Over - Demo" and "Talking Disaster - Demo" but now these aren't available because they deleted it to focus on their debut album, Fall In Fall Out.

In 2017 The Luka State started writing music for their debut album, which would become Fall In Fall Out, in their Winsford rehearsal space whilst touring extensively across the UK and internationally.

The band self-funded the recording of Fall In Fall Out at The Pool studio in London between October 2017 and August 2018 with producer Jamie Evans. Additionally the track "Bold" was produced by Simon Edwards, formerly the bassist of Fairground Attraction and Billy Bragg’s touring band, in his home studio.

Alan Moulder (producer of U2, Arctic Monkeys, Nine Inch Nails) and Mike Cave (who had worked with Lewis Capaldi) mixed the majority of the record, with Catherine Marks mixing "Bold" and Tarek Musa mixing "What's My Problem".

The band originally planned to self-release the album before signing to NYC based record label Anti Fragile in December 2019, and then signing to Shelter Music / BMG across Europe in November 2020. They finally launched it on 2021 during pandemic

In May 2022 the band launched what will be their next album campaign, with the single "Bring Us Down" released alongside announcing their first headline tour of North America, planned for autumn 2022, following UK touring that begins at 2000trees. Also, this song appeared on Dream League Soccer 2023, the last song of the band in the saga.

In July 2025 lead vocalist Conrad Ellis sustained multiple injuries after falling off stage during the La Sainte Rock Festival. These injuries caused the band's work on their third studio album to be put on hold while Conrad recovered.

In April 2026 the band announced on their official Instagram page that they will be taking a hiatus, citing the injury Conrad sustained a year prior as the event that took the wind out of their sails. The band also acknowledged that work had continued on their third studio album but it once again had to be put on hold.

== Football collaborations ==
Their song Bring This All Together was featured in the game Dream League Soccer 2018. The song was also used by broadcasters Sky Sports across Europe 350 times a day, gaining the attention of music industry magazine Music Week which ran an article on the band's sync placement. Another song, Kick In The Teeth, was featured in Dream League Soccer 2019. Then, Fake News on Dream League Soccer 2021. Their song Bring Us Down was also featured on Dream League Soccer 2023.

The band's music has been frequently played at football grounds across the UK, including at Manchester United F.C.'s home ground Old Trafford, as part of the pre-game warm up entertainment. In November 2018, The Luka State performed live at Wembley Stadium's fan zone ahead of the England vs Croatia match being played that day.

== Discography ==
=== Singles ===
- "Matter Of Time" (December 2013)
- "30 Minute Break" (March 2014)
- "Rain" (July 2014)
- "The Believer" (March 2015)
- "Can’t Help Myself" (June 2015)
- "Bring This All Together - Spring King Mix" (2015, no longer available)
- "Lies! Lies! Lies!" (Jan 2017)
- "Bring This All Together (Re Release)" (May 2017)
- "Bold" (18 August 2017)
- "Bury Me" (September 2018)
- "Kick In The Teeth" (December 2018)
- "What’s My Problem" (January 2019)
- "Girl" (June 2019)
- "Fake News" (January 2020)
- "[Insert Girls Name Here]" (March 2020)
- "Feel It" (May 2020)
- "Room’s On Fire" (May 2020)
- "Real Thing" (June 2020)
- "Bold" (July 2020)
- "Feel It (Tarek Musa Mix)" (November 2020)
- "Fall In Fall Out" [SINGLE] (January 2021)
- "What's My Problem (Acoustic)" (April 2021)
- "Real Thing (Acoustic)" (May 2021)
- "Fall In Fall Out (Acoustic)" (June 2021)
- "Room's On Fire (Acoustic)" (June 2021)
- "Oxygen Thief" (Jan 2022)
- "Bring us Down" (May 2022)
- "Stick Around" (Aug 2022)
- "Tightrope (Walking On A Wire) [Dan Weller Mix]" (Jul 2023)
- "Anxious Times" (Nov 2023)
- "Liar" (Jan 2024)
- "ENEMY" (ft. Flash Forward) (March 2024)
- "Conspiracy" (Oct 2024)
- "True Confidence (Is Living)" (November 2024)
- "Give Me A Reason" (January 2025)

=== EPs ===
- The Price of Education [EP] (8 June 2015)
- Demos [EP] (4 November 2016)
- A Taste Of Things To Come [EP] (10 May 2019)
- [Insert Girl's Name Here] [EP] (6 March 2020)
- "Feel It" (June 2020)
- The Luka State [EP] (14 February 2025)

=== Albums ===
- Fall In Fall Out (29 January 2021)
- More Than This (10 March 2023)
