= Montreal Independent Film Festival =

Film festival in Montreal, Canada

Montreal Independent Film Festival (MIFF) is a film festival showcasing international independent films in Montreal, Quebec, Canada. MIFF comprises a series of monthly festivals as well as two main festivals each year. Live screenings take place at the Cinema du Parc in Montreal, with selected online screenings on the Montreal Independent Film Channel.

== History ==
The Montreal Independent Film Festival was founded by Minima Films and Baraheni Films, which have been screening films since 2019 at the Cinema du Parc of Montreal. The inaugural edition of the festival was held in April–May 2020.

== Description ==
Montreal Independent Film Festival screens new independent short and feature films of all genres, from Canada and around the world. It receives thousands of entries each year.

Monthly editions award a selection of films, which are then considered for the annual festival, which is split into two events. Main events occur twice a year with screenings of finalists at the Cinema du Parc in Montreal. These films are eligible for cash prizes, as well as various promotions and bonuses for the filmmakers and other creatives. The winners and official selections of the monthly festival may also be screened online, on the Montreal Independent Film Channel.

Arsalan Baraheni is the artistic director of the Montreal Independent Film Festival.

== Awards ==
There are many award categories, including:

- Best Narrative Feature
- Best Narrative Short
- Best Feature Documentary
- Best Short Documentary
- Best Female Director
- Best Independent Film
- Best Horror
- Best Comedy
- Best Animation
- Best Web Series/TV Pilot
- Best Environmental
- Best Human Rights
- Best First Time Filmmaker
- Best Student Film
- Best LGBTQ
- Best Music Video
- Best Thriller
- Canadian Indies
- Best Director
- Best Cinematographer
- Best Actor
- Best Actress
- Best Editor
- Best Composer
- Best Youth Artist
- Best Feature Script
- Best Short Script
