= Jadey Duffield =

English actress

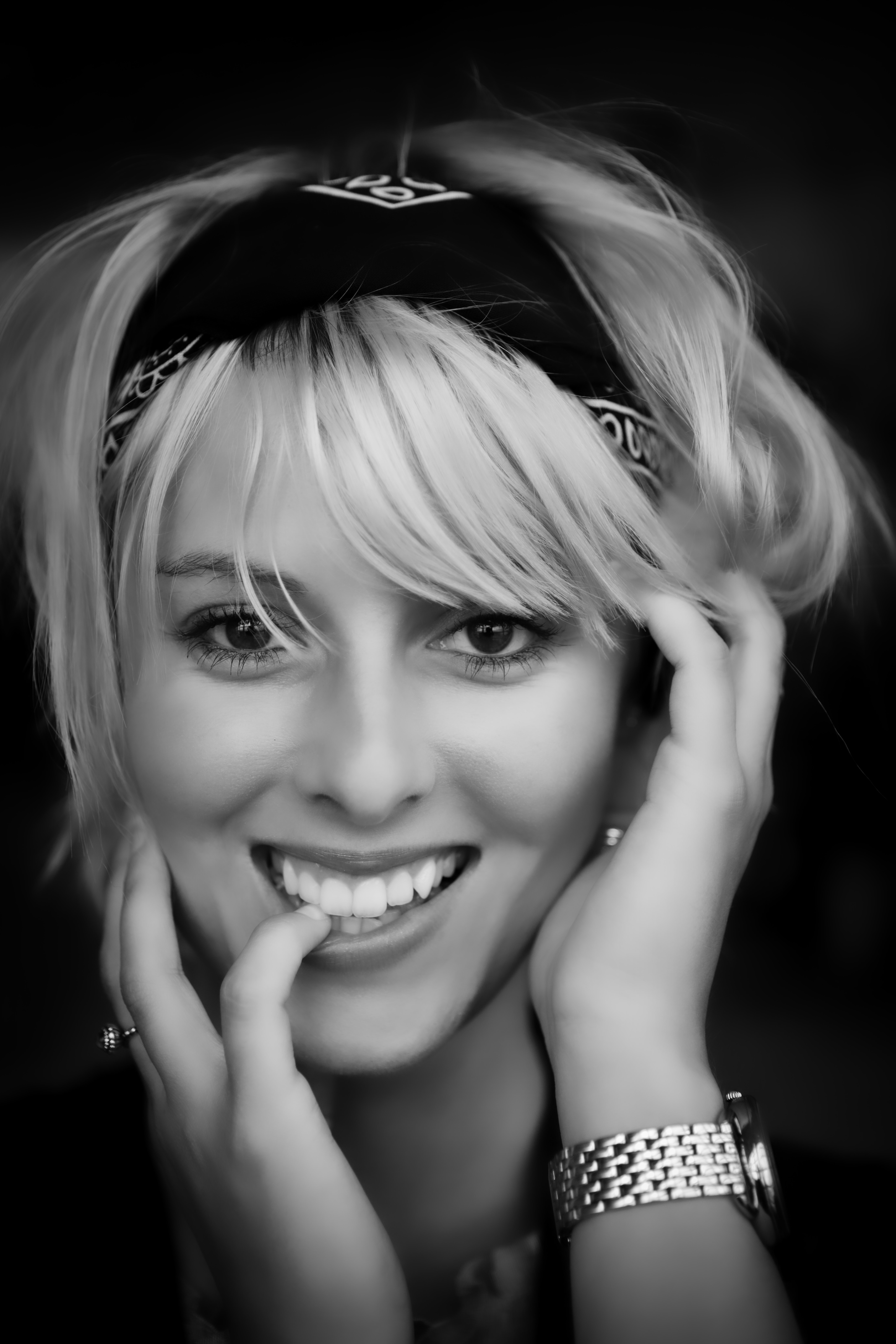
- Jadey Duffield in 2019
- Born: 15 February 1991 (age 35); Kent, South East England, United Kingdom
- Occupations: Actress, Producer, Screenwriter

Jadey Duffield (born 15 February 1991) is a British actress, producer and screenwriter. Duffield rose to prominence for her role as Lara Darwin in feature film C.O.O.L.I.O (2014). Since then, Duffield has acted in various films, including Guardians of the Galaxy (2014), produced by Marvel Studios, The Huntsman: Winter's War (2016), starring Chris Hemsworth, Charlize Theron, Emily Blunt and Jessica Chastain, and Ready Player One (2018), produced and directed by Steven Spielberg, starring Tye Sheridan, Olivia Cooke, Ben Mendelsohn, Lena Waithe, T.J. Miller, Simon Pegg, and Mark Rylance.

== Early life ==
Jadey Duffield was born and raised in Kent, United Kingdom where she studied theatre and dance from a very young age. Her early training provided an excellent outlet for her enthusiasm and energy, proving also to be a fortunate precursor to the start of her professional acting career. At the age of 16, Duffield moved to London to study at the Reynolds Performing Arts School for 3 years. Graduating at 19, Duffield started her professional dance and acting career.

== Career ==
=== 2009–2013 ===
Duffield has been acting professionally since 2009, starring in and producing many UK independent films early on. Duffield has worked on the set of major productions such as BBC and Channel 4, worldwide TV commercials, music videos, live performances and was the face of the 2011 Nintendo Wii karaoke game We Sing Down Under.

In 2013, Duffield performed as a dancer for 2013 American action film Fast & Furious 6, starring Vin Diesel, Paul Walker, Dwayne Johnson, Michelle Rodriguez, Jordana Brewster, Tyrese Gibson, Chris "Ludacris" Bridges, Sung Kang, Luke Evans, Gina Carano, Gal Gadot, and John Ortiz. In July of the same year, at Shepperton Studios in England, Duffield played the role of Xander in Guardians of the Galaxy, an American superhero film produced by Marvel Studios. The ensemble cast included Chris Pratt, Zoe Saldaña, Dave Bautista, Vin Diesel, and Bradley Cooper.

=== 2014–2016 ===
Duffield starred as Lara Darwin in feature film C.O.O.L.I.O (2014), alongside Geoff Bell, Brain Croucher and Vikki Michelle.

In September 2015, Duffield took time off to work on writing her own action feature films as well as train in martial arts.

In 2016, Duffield appeared as a Huntswoman in the action adventure film The Huntsman: Winter's War, starring Chris Hemsworth, Charlize Theron, Emily Blunt and Jessica Chastain.

=== 2017–Present ===
In 2017, Duffield continued to work on her own projects, networking and collaborating with film investors within the UK.

Later in 2017, Duffield became involved in the American science fiction film Ready Player One (2018), produced and directed by Steven Spielberg, starring Tye Sheridan, Olivia Cooke, Ben Mendelsohn, Lena Waithe, T.J. Miller, Simon Pegg, and Mark Rylance. Filmed at Warner Bros Studios in England, Ready Player One was Duffield's first professional experience with motion capture, in which she doubled for one of the film's main characters, Sho.

In January 2018, Duffield started her own production company DreamMore Film. Duffield's knowledge and understanding of the film business, combined with a strong support infrastructure and unique business partnership with Steve Raeside formed the motivation behind her venture. Duffield's current focus with her studio is on creating and writing stories with innovative action sequences that are tailored for cinematic audiences worldwide, with particular emphasis on the Chinese and US markets. As part of this effort, Duffield has met with various large production companies and investors around the world around the world with her feature film scripts to greenlight these projects for 2019.

== Filmography ==
=== Film ===
Movies
Year	Title	Role	Notes
2013	Fast & Furious 6	Podium Girl	
2014	C.O.O.L.I.O.	Lara Darwin	
2014	Guardians of the Galaxy	Xander	
2015	The Singleton	Karma Blake	
2015	Serving Miss Garbo	Gina Garbo	
2015	The Cure	Lucille Liberty	
2015	Twisted	Libby	
2016	The Huntsman: Winter's War	Huntswomen	
2016	Londinium	Maggie Delin	
2017	16/07	Ann Boulevard	
2018	Ready Player One	Motion Capture	

== Awards and nominations ==
Year	Award	Category	Result	Work
2015	Watergate Film Festival	Best Lead Actress	Won	Twisted
2015	Watergate Film Festival	Best Supporting Actress	Won	The Cure
2015	Watergate Film Festival	Best Script	Won	Twisted
