= List of awards and nominations received by José Padilha =

This is a list of awards and nominations for Brazilian director, producer and screenwriter José Padilha.

== ACIE Awards ==
Year	Category	Nominated work	Result	Ref.
2008	Best Picture	Elite Squad	Won	
2008	Best Director	Elite Squad	Won	
2008	Audience Award	Elite Squad	Won	
2008	Best Screenplay	Elite Squad	Nominated	
2011	Best Picture	Elite Squad: The Enemy Within	Won	
2011	Best Screenplay	Elite Squad: The Enemy Within	Won	
2011	Best Director	Elite Squad: The Enemy Within	Nominated	

== Cinema Brazil Grand Prize ==
Year	Category	Nominated work	Result	Ref.
2001	Best Cultural Production for TV	Os Carvoeiros	Nominated	
2003	Best Documentary	Bus 174	Nominated	
2003	Best Screenplay, Original	Bus 174	Nominated	
2008	Best Director	Elite Squad	Won	
2008	Best Screenplay, Original	Elite Squad	Nominated	
2008	Best Film	Elite Squad	Nominated	
2011	Best Film	Elite Squad: The Enemy Within	Won	
2011	Best Director	Elite Squad: The Enemy Within	Won	

== Havana Film Festival ==
Year	Category	Nominated work	Result	Ref.
2003	Best Documentary	Bus 174	Won	
2003	Memoria Documentary Award	Bus 174	Won	
2011	Best Director	Elite Squad: The Enemy Within	Won	
2011	Best Film	Elite Squad: The Enemy Within	Won	

== Rio de Janeiro International Film Festival ==
Year	Category	Nominated work	Result	Ref.
2003	Best Brazilian Film	Bus 174	Won	
2003	Best Documentary	Bus 174	Won	

Year	Award	Category	Nominated work	Result	Ref.
2003	Directors Guild of America	Outstanding Directing – Documentaries	Bus 174	Nominated	
2003	International Documentary Association	Video Source Award	Bus 174	Won	
2003	Miami International Film Festival	Documentary Features - Ibero-American Cinema Competition	Bus 174	Won	
2003	Filmfest München	One Future Prize	Bus 174	Won	
2003	International Film Festival Rotterdam	Special Mention	Bus 174	Won	
2008	Ariel Award	Best Latin-American Film	Elite Squad	Nominated	
2008	Berlin International Film Festival	Golden Bear	Elite Squad	Won	
2008	São Paulo Association of Art Critics Awards	Best Director	Elite Squad	Won	
2009	Argentinean Film Critics Association Awards	Best Ibero-American Film	Elite Squad	Won	
2011	Houston Film Critics Society Awards	Best Foreign Language Film	Elite Squad: The Enemy Within	Nominated	
2011	National Board of Review	Best Foreign Language Film	Elite Squad: The Enemy Within	Nominated	
