= Zazen Produções =

Cinematic production company in Brazil

- Company type: Private
- Industry: Films
- Founded: 1997
- Headquarters: Rio de Janeiro, Brazil
- Website: www.zazen.com.br

Zazen Produções is a Brazilian film and television production company founded in 1997 by filmmakers Marcos Prado and José Padilha.

Zazen have their films distributed in Theaters and TV for various countries by companies, such as IM Global, Universal Pictures, Paramount Pictures, The Weinstein Company, HBO, National Geographic, ARTE France, BBC, NHK, ThinkFilm, RioFilme, SIC Portugal and Canal Brasil, among others.

== Filmmaking ==
- O Mecanismo (Netflix) (2018)
- Paraísos Artificiais (2012)
- Tropa de Elite 2 (2010)
- Nunca Antes na História Desse País (2009)
- Água (2009)
- 68 Destinos (2009)
- Paraísos Artificiais (2009)
- Garapa (2008)
- Tropa de Elite (2007)
- Um Buda (2005)
- Estamira (2004)
- Ônibus 174 (2002)
