= Prêmio ACIE de Cinema for Best Picture =

Film award category

The Prêmio ACIE de Cinema was a Brazilian awards cinema show that lasted until 2013. Listed here are all the winners of "best picture" from the show's run.

== 2004 ==
Film	Production company(s)	Producer(s)
O Homem Que Copiava	Columbia TriStar TLA Releasing	Jorge Furtado
Carandiru	Sony Pictures Classics Globo Filmes	Héctor Babenco
O Homem do Ano	Film Movement Warner Home Video	José Henrique Fonseca
Amarelo Manga	RioFilme	Cláudio Assis

== 2005 ==
Film	Production company(s)	Producer(s)
O Outro Lado da Rua		Marcos Bernstein
Cazuza – O Tempo Não Pára	Columbia TriStar	Walter Carvalho, Sandra Werneck
Contra Todos		Roberto Moreira
Nina	Columbia TriStar	Heitor Dhalia

== 2007 ==
Film	Production company(s)	Producer(s)
O Ano que Meus Pais Saíram de Férias	Buena Vista International	Cao Hamburger
O Maior Amor do Mundo	Sony Pictures, Columbia TriStar Filmes do Brasil	Carlos Diegues
Anjos do Sol		Rudi Lagemann
Céu de Suely	Celluloid Dreams, Shotgun Pictures, Fado Filmes	Karim Aïnouz

== 2008 ==
Film	Production company(s)	Producer(s)
Tropa de Elite	Universal Pictures, IFC Films	José Padilha
Alice's House		Chico Teixeira
Mutum		Sandra Kogut
O Cheiro do Ralo	Primo Filmes	Heitor Dhalia

== 2009 ==
Film	Production company(s)	Producer(s)
Estômago	Downtown Filmes	Marcos Jorge
Linha de Passe	Double Helix Entertainment, Media Rights Capital, Pathé, Videofilmes	Walter Salles, Daniela Thomas
Meu Nome Não É Johnny	Sony Pictures Entertainment	Mauro Lima
Chega de Saudade	Buena Vista International	Laís Bodanzky

== 2010 ==
Film	Production company(s)	Producer(s)
É Proibido Fumar		Anna Muylaert
Salve Geral		Sergio Rezende
A Festa Da Menina Morta		Matheus Nachtergaele
Verônica		Maurício Farias

== 2011 ==
Film	Production company(s)	Producer(s)
Tropa de Elite 2 – O Inimigo Agora é Outro	Zazen Produções	José Padilha
Olhos Azuis	Imagem Filmes, Schröder Media	José Joffily
As Melhores Coisas do Mundo	Warner Bros. Pictures, Riofilme	Laís Bodanzky
5 x Favela - Agora Por Nós Mesmos		Cacau Amaral, Luciano Vidigal, Rodrigo Felha, Cadu Barcelos, Wagner Novais, Manaira Carneiro, Luciana Bezerra
