= Silver Condor Award for Best Ibero-American Film =

Annual Argentine film award

The Silver Condor Award for Best Ibero-American film (Spanish: Premio Cóndor de Plata a la mejor película iberoamericana), given by the Argentine Film Critics Association, awards the best Ibero-American film each year. The first award was given in 2005.

Year	Film	Director	Country	Ref.
2020	Dolor y gloria	Pedro Almodóvar	Spain	
2019	La noche de 12 años	Álvaro Brechner	Uruguay Spain Argentina	
2018	Aquarius	Kleber Mendonça Filho	Brazil	
2017	El abrazo de la serpiente	Ciro Guerra	Colombia	
2016	Gloria	Sebastián Lelio	Chile	
2015	7 cajas	Juan Carlos Maneglia and Tana Schémbori	Paraguay	
2014	Tabu	Miguel Gomes	Portugal	
2013	¡Atraco!	Eduard Cortés	Argentina Spain	
2012	Balada triste de trompeta	Alex de la Iglesia	Spain	
2011	Gigante	Adrián Biniez	Uruguay	
2010	El baño del Papa	César Charlone; Luis Enrique Fernández Marta	Uruguay	
2009	Tropa de Elite	José Padilha	Brazil	
2008	El laberinto del fauno	Guillermo del Toro	Mexico Spain	
2007	Volver	Pedro Almodóvar	Spain	
2006	Mar adentro	Alejandro Amenábar	Spain	
2005	Maria Full of Grace	Joshua Marston	Colombia	
