= Tainá Müller =

Brazilian actress

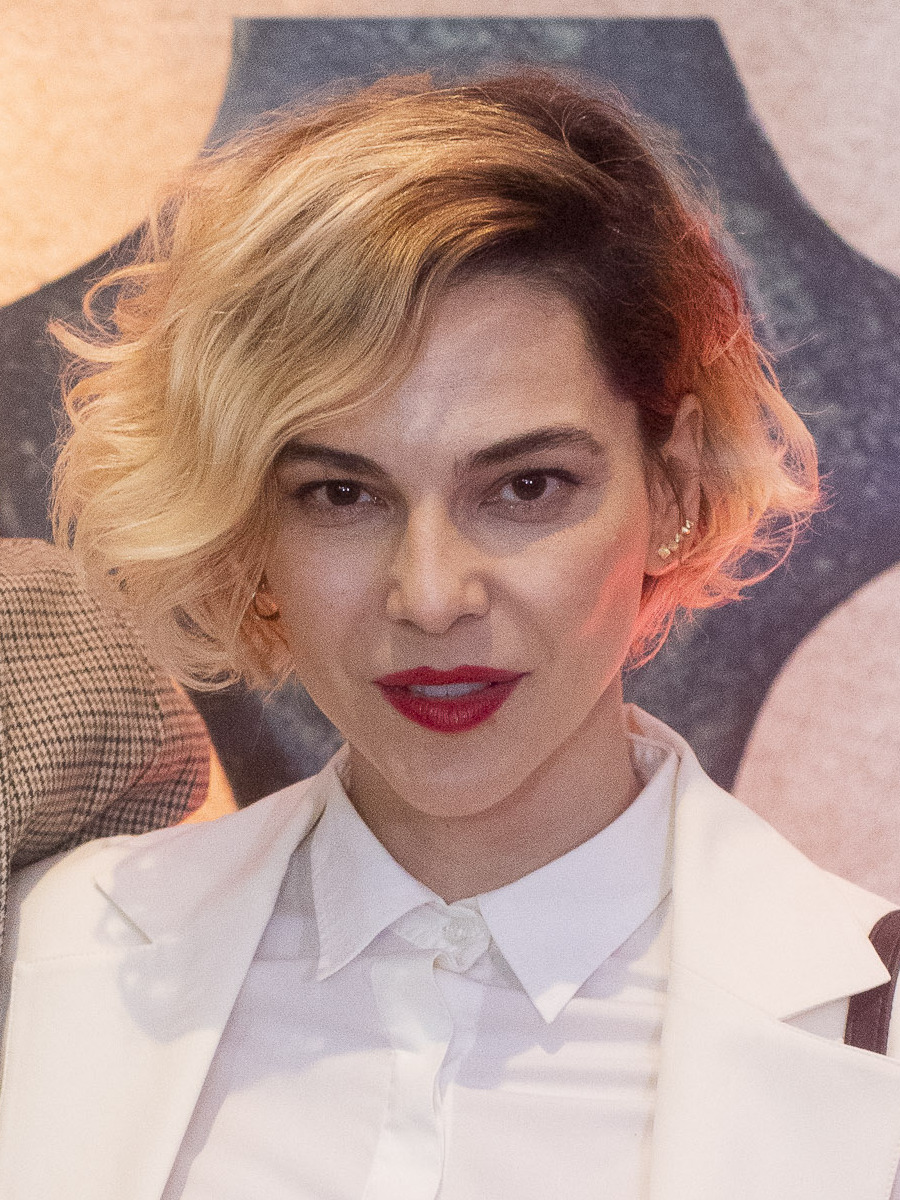
- Müller in 2023.
- Born: 1 June 1982 (age 44); Porto Alegre, Rio Grande do Sul, Brazil
- Occupations: Actress, model
- Years active: 2003–present
- Spouses: Daniel Galera (m. 2000; div. 2007) Henrique Sauer (m. 2013)
- Children: 1
- Relatives: Titi Müller (sister)
- Modeling information
- Height: 1.70 m (5 ft 7 in)
- Hair color: Brown
- Eye color: Brown

Tainá Müller (born 1 June 1982) is a Brazilian actress. She is the oldest of three sisters, actress Tuti Müller and MTV VJ Titi Müller.

== Career ==
At the age of 19, she began working as a VJ for MTV Brasil in Rio Grande do Sul, while also working as a model, doing seasons in Milan, Hong Kong, and Bangkok.

In 2005, she moved to São Paulo and began studying theater. In 2007, she made her film debut in Cão Sem Dono, for which she received Best Actress awards at several Brazilian festivals. Shortly after, she made her television debut on the Rede Globo telenovela Eterna Magia, portraying Laura Mascarenhas.

In 2014, she joined the cast of the soap opera Em Família, in which she plays Marina, a lesbian photographer who is in love with Clara Fernandes (Giovanna Antonelli).

== Personal life ==
On 30 November 2013, Tainá Müller married her husband Henrique Sauer in a simple shamanic wedding ceremony in Mexico. Muller and husband welcomed their first child in April 2016.

== Film ==
Year	Title	Role
2007	Cão sem Dono	Marcela
2008	Plastic City	Rita
2008	Se Nada Mais Der Certo	Mile
2009	Em uma Noite Escura, as Rosas São Amarelas	Ana
2009	Descalça	Laura
2010	Tropa de Elite 2	Clara
2011	As Mães de Chico Xavier	Lara
2012	E Aí... Comeu?	Vitória Brandão
2013	As Fantásticas Aventuras de um Capitão	Dorothy
2014	Blue Lips	Mujer Guido
2017	Bingo: The King of the Mornings	Angélica

== Television ==
Year	Title	Role	Notes
2007	Eterna Magia	Laura Mascarenhas	34 episodes
2009	Revelação	Victória de Castro	28 episodes
2010	A Liga	Presenter	1 episode
2011	Insensato Coração	Paula Cortez	106 episodes
2012	Cheias de Charme	Liara Mariz	143 episodes
2013	Flor do Caribe	Ludmilla Villalba	
2014	Em Família	Marina Meirelles	
2015	Babilônia	Cris	
2016	Edifício Paraiso	Bia	
2018	O Outro Lado do Paraíso	Aura	
2020–	Good Morning, Verônica	Verônica Torres	

== Awards and nominations ==
Year	Film	Award	Result	Category
Cuiabá Film and Video Festival
2007	Cão Sem Dono	Coxiponé Award	Won	Best Actress
Recife Cine PE Audiovisual Festival
2007	Cão Sem Dono	Calunga Trophy	Won	Best Actress
Prêmio ACIE de Cinema
2008	Cão Sem Dono	ACIE Awards	Nom	Best Actress
Cinema Brazil Grand Prize
2011	Elite Squad: The Enemy Within	Cinema Brazil Grand Prize	Nominated	Best Supporting Actress
Los Angeles Brazilian Film Festival
2011	As Mães de Chico Xavier	LABRFF Award	Won	Best Supporting Actress
Prêmio Contigo Cinema, Brazil
2011	As Mães de Chico Xavier	Audience Award	Won	Best Supporting Actress
2011	As Mães de Chico Xavier	Jury Award	Nominated	Best Supporting Actress
