= RoboCop (2014 film) =

Film by José Padilha

- Theatrical release poster
- Directed by: José Padilha
- Written by: Joshua Zetumer; Edward Neumeier; Michael Miner
- Based on: RoboCop by: Edward Neumeier; Michael Miner
- Produced by: Marc Abraham; Eric Newman
- Starring: Joel Kinnaman; Gary Oldman; Michael Keaton; Abbie Cornish; Jackie Earle Haley; Michael K. Williams; Jennifer Ehle; Jay Baruchel; Samuel L. Jackson
- Cinematography: Lula Carvalho
- Edited by: Daniel Rezende; Peter McNulty
- Music by: Pedro Bromfman
- Production companies: Metro-Goldwyn-Mayer Pictures; Columbia Pictures; Strike Entertainment
- Distributed by: Sony Pictures Releasing
- Release date: February 12, 2014
- Running time: 118 minutes
- Country: United States
- Language: English
- Budget: $100–130 million
- Box office: $242.6 million

RoboCop is a 2014 American cyberpunk superhero film that is a remake of the 1987 film and the fourth installment of the RoboCop franchise. The film was directed by José Padilha and written by Joshua Zetumer, Edward Neumeier, and Michael Miner. Joel Kinnaman stars as the title character, with Gary Oldman, Michael Keaton, Abbie Cornish, Jackie Earle Haley, Michael K. Williams, Jennifer Ehle, Jay Baruchel, and Samuel L. Jackson in supporting roles. Set in 2028, a detective becomes critically injured and is turned into a cyborg police officer whose programming blurs the line between man and machine.

Sony Pictures' Screen Gems first announced a remake in 2005, but it was halted one year later. Darren Aronofsky and David Self were originally assigned to direct and write the film, respectively, for a tentative 2010 release. The film was delayed numerous times, and Padilha signed on in 2011. In March 2012, Metro-Goldwyn-Mayer Pictures (successor company to Orion Pictures until September 11, 2014, the studio that released the original film) announced an August 2013 release, but that was then changed to February 2014. The principal characters were cast from March to July 2012. Principal photography began in September 2012 in Toronto and Vancouver in Canada, with additional locations in Hamilton, in Canada, and Detroit in the United States.

RoboCop released in the United States on February 12, 2014, by Sony Pictures Releasing. The film received mixed reviews, being considered inferior to the original film, although the visual effects, the cast performances and the action sequences were praised. It grossed $242.6 million against its $100–130 million budget.

== Plot ==
In 2028, OmniCorp revolutionizes warfare by introducing robotic peacekeeping drones. CEO Raymond Sellars wants to market this technology to U.S. law enforcement, but the Dreyfus Act bans the use of domestic militarized drones. Knowing that a majority of Americans oppose military systems in communities, Sellars consults roboticist Dr. Dennett Norton on the viability of developing cyborgs with OmniCorp technology. Norton warns him that the process would be incredibly traumatic, and that they must find the right candidate.

A Detroit police detective, Alex Murphy, is selected after a car-bomb planted by crime boss Antoine Vallon leaves him critically injured. Norton persuades Alex's wife, Clara, to approve the procedure. Upon waking, Alex escapes after realizing his transformation, but Norton shuts him down and returns him to the lab. Norton reveals that most of his body is gone, leaving only parts of his head with a repaired cybernetic brain, respiratory organs, heart, and right hand. Horrified, Alex asks for euthanasia, but Norton urges him to live for the possibility of being reunited with his family. During training with Rick Mattox, Alex struggles to match the drones; Norton creates a new subroutine that allows Alex' programming to take control of his actions, making him incredibly efficient but also reducing his empathy.

Before his public unveiling, Alex experiences an emotional breakdown and Norton has no choice but to completely suppress his emotions. During the ceremony, RoboCop identifies and apprehends a wanted fugitive in the crowd. As he reduces crime in Detroit, the public becomes more supportive of repealing the Dreyfus Act. Realizing Clara is inquiring about her husband, Sellars instructs Norton to distance her from him.

Clara tells RoboCop about David's nightmares and social withdrawal. Driven by this, Alex overrides his programming to access sealed files on his attempted murder. Learning of Vallon's culpability, he guns down the boss and all of his men in a fierce shootout. With help from his former partner Jack Lewis, Alex then tracks down the two dirty cops who betrayed him to Vallon. Upon realizing that the Chief of Police covered up their actions, he attempts to arrest her only to be remotely deactivated by Mattox.

Through Pat Novak's news show, Sellars uses the incident to get the Dreyfus Act repealed. When Clara threatens public exposure unless she's allowed to see her husband, Sellars lies to her that Alex died from surgical complications while secretly ordering his men to euthanize him. Norton helps Alex escape just as OmniCorp goes into full lockdown.

Alex forces his way inside and overcomes the building's automated security as the police arrive. Mattox is able to subdue him but is swiftly killed by Lewis. Reaching the rooftop helipad, Alex finds Sellars holding his wife and son at gunpoint while revealing that Robocop's programming prevents him from harming any top executive of OmniCorp. Through sheer will, Alex is able to pull off a quickdraw with his pistol and finish off Sellars.

OmniCorp's parent company, OCP, shuts down the project. The U.S. President vetoes the repeal of the Dreyfus Act based on Norton's testimony, much to Novak's anger. Alex's body is rebuilt in Norton's laboratory, and he waits for Clara and David, who are coming to visit him.

== Cast ==
- Joel Kinnaman as Alex Murphy / RoboCop: A young police detective who is injured in an explosion and transformed into a cyborg
- Gary Oldman as Dr. Dennett Norton: Omni foundation chief scientist who creates RoboCop
- Michael Keaton as Raymond Sellars: The CEO of OmniCorp
- Abbie Cornish as Clara Murphy: Alex's wife
- Jackie Earle Haley as Rick Mattox: A drone controller and automated military tactician expert responsible for training RoboCop
- Michael K. Williams as Jack Lewis: Alex's best friend and former partner
- Jennifer Ehle as Liz Kline: The head of OmniCorp legal affairs
- Jay Baruchel as Tom Pope: The head of marketing for OmniCorp
- Marianne Jean-Baptiste as Karen Dean: Detroit chief of police
- Samuel L. Jackson as Pat Novak: Host of The Novak Element and prominent supporter of mechanized crime control
- Zach Grenier as Hubert Dreyfus: A senator of Michigan and prominent opponent of increased mechanization
- Aimee Garcia as Dr. Jae Kim: Norton's colleague
- Douglas Urbanski as Durant: The mayor of Detroit
- John Paul Ruttan as David Murphy: Alex and Clara's son
- Patrick Garrow as Antoine Vallon: A sadistic gang boss
- K. C. Collins as Andre Daniels
- Daniel Kash as John Lake

== Production ==
=== Development ===
"I wanted to make a film that is passed into the near future. Now the Aronofsky's script was going 3000 years in the future when humanity would have lost the notion of morality and the only place wherein could recover this concept was in the RoboCop program. It has nothing to do with what I wanted, so I did not even read the script."

— Director José Padilha, on Darren Aronofsky's initial script.

Sony Pictures Entertainment's Screen Gems division first announced that it was working on a new RoboCop film in late 2005; no further details were given. In November 2006, Bloody Disgusting reported that the RoboCop remake had been halted. In March 2008, RoboCop was mentioned in a Metro-Goldwyn-Mayer (MGM) press release regarding franchises it would be developing in the future. An MGM poster displayed at the Licensing International Expo of June 2008 read, "RoboCop coming 2010." The studio met with Darren Aronofsky to discuss the possibility of him directing the film. At the 2008 San Diego Comic-Con, Aronofsky was confirmed to direct the "2010 RoboCop" film, with David Self writing the script. In October of 2008, science fiction author and screenwriter Harlan Ellison confirmed that he and his fellow screenwriter Josh Olson had been similarly approached to write for the film but that they had both decided to decline the offer. The release date was postponed to 2011. At San Diego Comic-Con in July 2009, MGM representatives stated only that the film would be pushed back to summer 2010 or a later date, due to scheduling conflicts with the director (most likely Aronofsky). MGM representatives would neither confirm nor deny if Aronofsky was still connected with the project.

On January 5, 2010, it was reported that the RoboCop remake was indeed on hold and Aronofsky was still attached to direct. When MGM executives, particularly MGM chairperson Mary Parent, saw the immense success of the James Cameron film Avatar (2009), it was clear that they wanted a 3D film for the new RoboCop. Due to the financial state of MGM at the time, without an owner, and creative disagreements between the studio and Aronofsky, the film remained on hold. On March 2, 2011, it was announced that Brazilian director José Padilha was attached to direct, instead of Aronofsky, mainly because of his commercial success with Elite Squad (2007) and Elite Squad: The Enemy Within (2010). On March 11, 2011, Sean O'Neal of The A.V. Club stated that up-and-coming screenwriter Joshua Zetumer would write the script. Although Zetumer had been involved with a number of canceled or otherwise stagnant projects, he had also worked on the screenplay for Quantum of Solace (2008). Comparing the new work to the 1987 film, Padilha said in 2011, "the environment nowadays is different than the environment in the 80's and the way to explore the concept is different." It was announced in October 2013 that the film would get an IMAX release in February 2014. Sony Pictures Releasing distributed the film in United States, Canada, and worldwide with the exclusion of United Kingdom, France, Germany, Switzerland and Austria, where StudioCanal handled distribution.

=== Pre-production ===
On April 12, 2011, rumors stated that MGM was looking at A-list stars such as Tom Cruise, Johnny Depp, and Keanu Reeves to star in the lead role of Alex Murphy/RoboCop in the upcoming remake. On June 16, 2011, pictures of promotional art were released, as well as a sales sheet from the Licensing International Expo 2011 in Las Vegas, NV, promoting a future release of RoboCop which would re-invent the franchise. The promotional material had sparse details of the film but clearly stated that MGM was targeting a 2013 release and Padilha was confirmed as director of the film. Michael Fassbender, Matthias Schoenaerts, and Russell Crowe were considered to play the title role. On March 3, 2012, it was confirmed that actor Joel Kinnaman would be playing the lead role, and on March 9, 2012, the film was given a release date of August 9, 2013. Hugh Laurie was set to play the role of the CEO of OmniCorp on June 13, 2012, but he later declined. Clive Owen was in the running to replace him until Michael Keaton was cast in the role in August 2012. Edward Norton, Sean Penn, Gael García Bernal, and Rebecca Hall were initially considered for the roles of Dr. Dennett Norton, Novak, Jack Lewis, and Clara Murphy, respectively. The roles ended up being cast with Gary Oldman, Samuel L. Jackson, Michael K. Williams, and Abbie Cornish. Jackie Earle Haley officially signed on in July 2012 to play a "military man named Mattox responsible for training Kinnaman's RoboCop". Jay Baruchel was confirmed to have signed onto the film on July 25, 2012, as Pope, a marketing exec for OmniCorp. Douglas Urbanski, cast as Mayor Durant, is typically a non-actor who is also the decades-long manager and producing partner of Gary Oldman. Rob Bottin's original costume for the title character was re-imagined. Initial reactions were unfavorable and some compared it with Christian Bale's Batman suit in Christopher Nolan's The Dark Knight films. News reports discussed a "rather derivative" design which "looks more like kevlar body armor than Detroit steel". The Guardian described the new RoboCop as "a crime-fighting machine who is not so much cyborg as skinny bloke in matte-black body armour" and said, "The new Robosuit has a scaly, insectoid look to it, with a blacked-out visor rather than the original's steel extended helmet."

Before starting filming, Brazilian director Fernando Meirelles revealed that Padilha called him to admit he was having "the worst experience of his life" and "for every ten ideas he has, nine are cut". Padilha, according to Meirelles, said, "It's hell here. The film will be good, but I have never suffered so much and I don't want to do it again." However, Padilha talked enthusiastically about the project at the 2013 San Diego Comic-Con and in his introduction to the second trailer. Production began in September 2012.

=== Filming ===
Filming took place in Toronto, other parts of Ontario, and Vancouver. Shooting locations within the city included the University of Toronto where a scene was filmed that appeared to be RoboCop being unveiled to the city of Detroit. Filming in Hamilton began on Monday, September 24, 2012, for five nights. Streets were closed for each of those days from 6pm to 7am. A spokesperson for MGM confirmed that the film was partially shot in Detroit.

== Music ==
RoboCop: Original Motion Picture Soundtrack

Soundtrack album by Pedro Bromfman
- Released: January 31, 2014 (iTunes); February 4, 2014 (CD)
- Studio: AIR Studios
- Genre: Film score
- Length: 54:28
- Label: Sony Classical
- Producer: Pedro Bromfman

Pedro Bromfman chronology
Maria Bonita (2013)	RoboCop: Original Motion Picture Soundtrack (2014)	Rio, I Love You (2014)

RoboCop chronology
A Future to This Life: Robocop – The Series Soundtrack (1995)	RoboCop (2014)

Pedro Bromfman, who collaborated with Padilha on his Elite Squad films, composed the score. When asked about the soundtrack, Bromfman's idea was to blend acoustic and electric instruments into a hybrid sound to symbolize RoboCop's transition into a cyborg. He mixed synthesizers with an 80-piece orchestra and altered their sound digitally. Bromfran also incorporated other instruments such as the cuíca, berimbau, waterphone, electric drill, and hang. In addition, he paid homage to Basil Poledouris' original 1987 film theme.

All tracks are written by Pedro Bromfman, except where noted.

No.	Title	Writer(s)	Length
1.	"Mattox and Reporters"		1:35
2.	"First Day"		3:23
3.	"Title Card"	Bromfman; Basil Poledouris	0:49
4.	"Restaurant Shootout"		2:47
5.	"Omnicorp"		1:40
6.	"Calling Home"		2:45
7.	"Made in China"		2:28
8.	"Fixing RoboCop"		1:56
9.	"Uploading Data"		1:35
10.	"Reputation on the Line"		1:31
11.	"Explosion"		1:05
12.	"RoboCop Presentation"		1:43
13.	"If I Had a Pulse"		2:41
14.	"Going After Jerry"		3:12
15.	"Vallon's Warehouse"		2:21
16.	"Murphy's Case Is Filed"		1:19
17.	"They're Going to Kill Him"		3:16
18.	"Rooftop"		2:56
19.	"Mattox Is Down"		1:40
20.	"Clara and David"		2:56
21.	"Sellars Lies"		2:28
22.	"Code Red"		2:00
23.	"2.6 Billion"		1:23
24.	"Iran Inspection"		2:12
25.	"Battling Robots"		2:47
Total length:			54:28

Songs not included in the soundtrack, but featured in the film include the following:

Additional used music
No.	Title	Artist	Length
1.	"Robocop Original Theme"	Basil Poledouris
2.	"Anguish"	Doug Bossi & Justin Knowell
3.	"En Aranjuez Con Tu Amor"	Raffi Altounian
4.	"Take My Life (Tonite)"	Fame
5.	"Fly Me to the Moon (In Other Words)"	Frank Sinatra
6.	"Hocus Pocus"	Focus
7.	"If I Only Had A Heart"	Andrew Page
8.	"I Fought the Law"	The Clash

== Release ==
=== Marketing ===
An OmniCorp website was set up in early 2012. A film-specific RoboCop site was launched nearer the release date. A rough trailer and some film footage featuring Samuel L. Jackson's and Michael Keaton's characters was shown at the 2013 San Diego Comic-Con. According to director Padilha, the first theatrical trailer was supposed to debut with Elysium, but it was instead released online on September 5, 2013, and was attached to showings of Riddick. Two further trailers were also released, one of which was uploaded to Yahoo! Movies with an introduction from Padilha, in which he said, "I'm thrilled to have had the chance to direct this movie ... I'm a fan of the original movie because it was ahead of its time both aesthetically and thematically. Back in '87, it was talking already about automated violence — both in war and law enforcement. And now, we actually have that happening in our lives and it's going to be more and more present. So we already have the drones. Now we're going to have automated robots doing law enforcement and replacing soldiers in the battlefield. So we had a chance to make this movie and talk about this." Two main posters were released in late 2013, with one showing CTBA complex in Madrid. TV spots were uploaded to Sony Pictures and StudioCanal UK's YouTube channels from January 2014. A video game for Android and iOS was released as a tie-in to the film. Jada Toys released a range of action figures, including a radio control RoboCop on his Police Cruiser and roleplay merchandise including the new RoboCop helmet and chestplate. Two detailed figures from the film, along with one from the original movie, were released in April 2014 from Play Arts Kai. The company threezero is also creating two RoboCop figures and a camo-coloured ED-209. Four one-shot comic tie-ins were published weekly starting from the week of theatrical release in the US. They were collected in a trade paperback edition under the title RoboCop: The Human Element to coincide with the home media releases.

=== Home media ===
RoboCop was released on DVD and Blu-ray on June 3, 2014, in the United States by 20th Century Fox Home Entertainment and MGM Home Entertainment. Best Buy had an exclusive Metalpak edition, while the Target edition came with an exclusive digital download of the previously unreleased comic "Gauntlet". In the UK, an exclusive Amazon steelbook was made available on June 9.

=== RoboCop Day ===
To coincide with the home media releases, Detroit celebrated with "RoboCop Day" on June 3, 2014, during which RoboCop was photographed with fans throughout the city, and threw the first pitch at the Detroit Tigers game.

== Reception ==
=== Box office ===
Robocop opened in 3,372 theaters in The United States and grossed $21,681,430, with an average of $6,430 per theater and ranking #3 at the box office. The film ultimately earned $58,607,007 domestically and $184,081,958 internationally for a total of $242,688,965, on a $100–130 million budget.

=== Critical response ===
RoboCop received mixed reviews. On review aggregation website Rotten Tomatoes, the film has an approval rating of 50% based on 220 reviews and an average rating of 5.6/10. The site's critical consensus reads, "While it's far better than it could have been, José Padilha's RoboCop remake fails to offer a significant improvement over the original." On Metacritic, which assigns a weighted average based on selected critic reviews, the film has a score of 52 out of 100 based on 41 critics, indicating "mixed or average reviews". Audiences surveyed by CinemaScore gave the film a "B+" grade, on an A+ to F scale.

RoboCop received several comparisons to the 1987 film; the consensus was that it fell short. Guy Lodge of Variety said that "It's a less playful enterprise than the original, but meets the era's darker demands for action reboots with machine-tooled efficiency and a hint of soul." Leslie Felperin from The Hollywood Reporter wrote that the remake "has a better cast, more meticulous script and, naturally, flashier effects, but it lacks the original's wit and subversive slipperiness." Andrew Osmond from SFX says, "It's not a classic like Paul Verhoeven's 1987 original, but it is an excellent, intelligent SF drama," believing it is "one of the boldest Hollywood reboots we've seen yet".

Chris Hewitt from Empire wrote, "there's a sense that Padilha, or perhaps his corporate overlords, don't really get what made the original so special." Nigel Andrews from Financial Times called it "a leaden, needless remake". Peter Bradshaw of The Guardian wrote it was "a dumbed-down shoot-em-up frontloaded with elaborate but perfunctory new 'satirical' material in which the movie loses interest with breathtaking speed". His fellow Guardian film critic Mark Kermode rated it 3 out of 5 stars, writing that "against the odds, this emerges as far less depressing fare than one might have expected, retaining the key elements of political satire and philosophical musings that powered Verhoeven's original" and "at least it appears to have been made by someone who understands what made the original great."

Nancy Allen, who played Anne Lewis in the original trilogy, did not like the remake, as she pointed to a lack of ideas from major movie studios as part of the reason for the seemingly endless glut of remakes, and stated that she did not think one should "remake iconic films". Allen went on to praise the original's script and crew.

== Future ==
=== Cancelled sequel ===
On September 11, 2015, Den of Geek reported that Sony was working on a sequel, though plans subsequently changed.

=== Reboot ===
In July 2018, it was announced the series would again be rebooted with a film directed by Neill Blomkamp, titled RoboCop Returns, which will serve as a direct sequel to Verhoeven's original film and ignore the events of previous sequels and the 2014 reboot. In August 2019, Blomkamp announced that he was no longer directing the film as he is focusing on directing a horror movie instead. On November 20, 2019, Abe Forsythe was set to direct.

In March 2023, after Amazon acquired MGM, they identified RoboCop as one of the company's priorities. In April of the same year, it was announced that Amazon Studios is developing a RoboCop television series and a new movie; the TV series would possibly be produced first.

== See also ==
- List of films featuring drones
