= Rodrigo R. Pimentel =

Brazilian military policeman and screenwriter (born 1971)

Rodrigo Rodrigues Pimentel
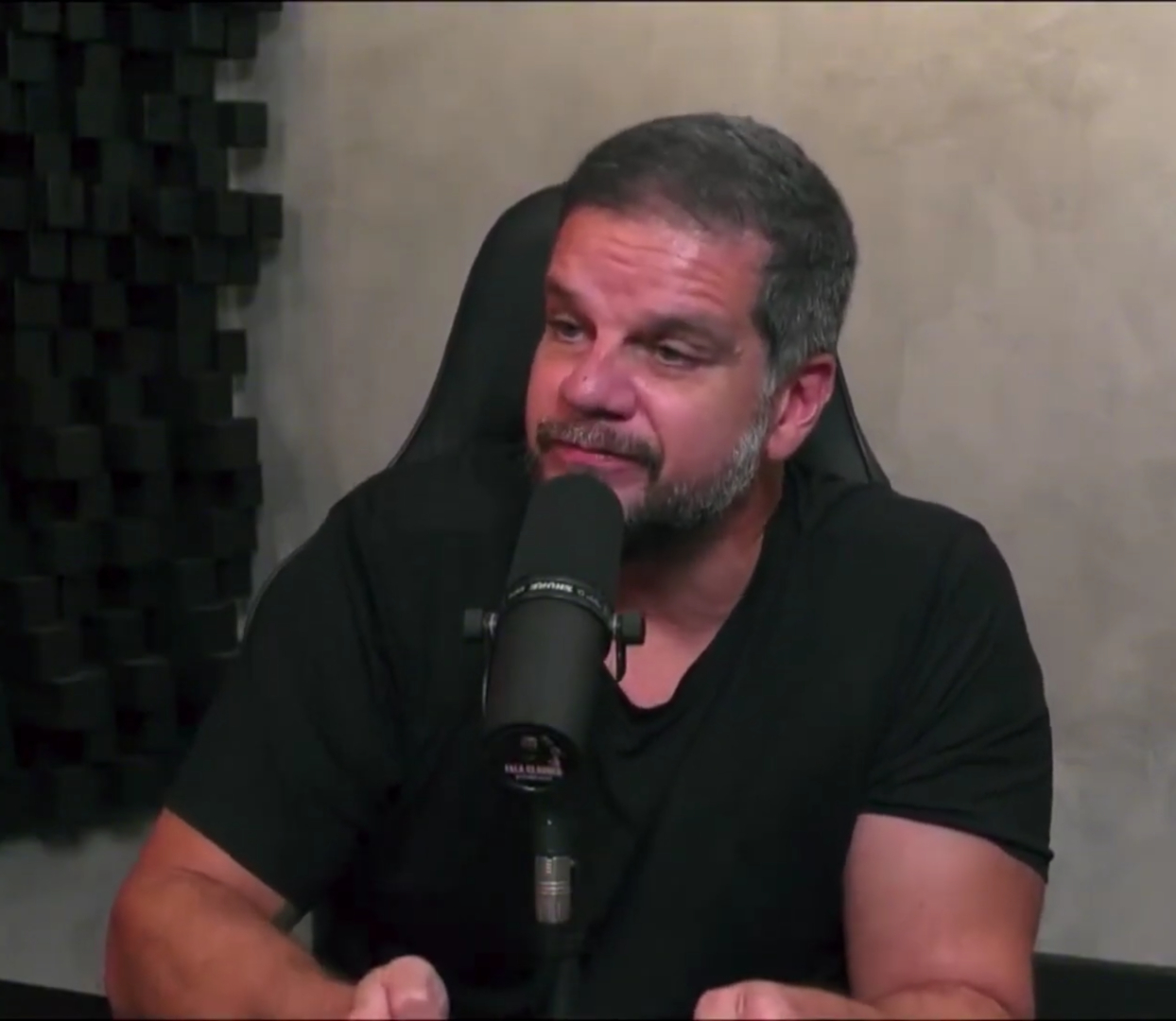
- Born: March 2, 1971 (age 55); Rio de Janeiro, Brazil
- Education: Dom João VI Military Police Academy
- Military career
- Branch: Military Police of Rio de Janeiro State
- Service years: 1990-2004
- Rank: Captain
- Unit: Battalion of Special Police Operations

Rodrigo Rodrigues Pimentel (born March 2, 1971), better known as Capitão Pimentel (lit. 'Captain Pimentel'), is a former Brazilian military officer, having served as an officer in the Military Police of Rio de Janeiro State from 1990 to 2004. A former captain of the Battalion of Special Police Operations, he conceived and was the screenwriter for the films Elite Squad and Elite Squad 2, and gained fame as the real-life person who inspired Captain Nascimento. Since 2019, he has had a YouTube channel.

== Biography ==
He served in the Military Police of Rio de Janeiro State from 1990 to 2004. As a captain, he was assigned to Battalion of Special Police Operations (BOPE) from 1994 to 2000. In 1997, he gave an interview in which he provides a detailed account of his experience in BOPE during counter-narcotics operations in Rio de Janeiro's hill communities and offers reflections on specialized policing in the capital. He holds a postgraduate degree in urban sociology from the Rio de Janeiro State University (UERJ). He was a columnist for Jornal do Brasil and co-producer of the documentary Bus 174.

A former BOPE member and now a security consultant, Pimentel joined the police force at the age of nineteen and requested voluntary resignation at thirty-three. His initial involvement with cinema occurred during the production of News from a Personal War. It was while filming the documentary Bus 174, which examines the hijacking of bus 174 in Rio de Janeiro, that Pimentel expressed his interest in creating a fictional work about the Rio police, drawing on testimonies from colleagues and his own experiences in BOPE. This marked the genesis of the Elite Squad project.

In 2005, while the film's screenplay was already in development, Pimentel co-authored the book Elite da Tropa alongside Luiz Eduardo Soares and André Batista. In 2010, he published the sequel, Elite da Tropa 2, with the same collaborators, in addition to Cláudio Ferraz. Although many have speculated that the protagonist of both the film and the book, Captain Nascimento, was based on Pimentel himself, he has stated that the character is entirely fictional, albeit inspired by events drawn from his own career and those of fellow BOPE officers.

Rodrigo Pimentel served as a security commentator for Rede Globo and was a regular contributor to RJTV 1ª Edição from 2011 to 2015.

In 2012, Anthony Garotinho published on his blog an allegation that Rodrigo Pimentel had obtained disability retirement through a fraudulent medical certificate and that he had "urinated in his trousers out of fear" during an operation. In the same post, he further claimed that "Everyone in BOPE is familiar with this story, which is remembered as an example of cowardice and dishonor for the elite unit". Pimentel brought a civil lawsuit against the former governor and secured a favorable judgment in 2018, in which the defendant was found guilty of defamation and sentenced to one year and four months of detention—a penalty subsequently converted to a fine of R$50,000 (reverted to the National Cancer Institute) and seven hours of weekly community service.

On March 20, 2023, he launched his YouTube channel, which, over the course of two years, has accumulated more than one thousand published videos, over 450,000 subscribers, and more than 370 million views.
