= Pedro Bromfman =

Brazilian musician, film composer and music producer

- Born: 20 January 1976 (age 50); Rio de Janeiro, Brazil
- Genres: Film scores; video-game scores
- Occupations: Musician; film composer; video game composer; music producer
- Instruments: Guitars, bass, percussion, piano, programming
- Years active: 1999–present
- Website: pedrobromfman.com

Pedro Bromfman (born 20 January 1976) is a Brazilian musician, film composer, video game composer and music producer. He is primarily known for having scored 2014's RoboCop, the TV series Narcos, Elite Squad and Elite Squad II; the highest-grossing film in Brazil's box office history, and the video game Max Payne 3. He has also composed the music for Panama Papers, "Thumper", The Story Of Us With Morgan Freeman, Chain of Command, The Blackout and the video game Need for Speed Heat. Bromfman's score for Far Cry 6 Ubisoft was nominated for a BAFTA Award, an ASCAP Award and two G.A.N.G. Awards (Music of the Year and Soundtrack Album of the Year). He has recently composed the music for Amazon’s ‘’Pimpinero: Blood and Oil’’ and Netflix’s ‘’Oklahoma City Bombing: American Terror’’.

== Life and career ==
Pedro Bromfman was born in Rio de Janeiro, Brazil, and was introduced to music at very young age, playing nylon string and electric guitars. When he turned eighteen, Pedro moved to Boston to attend the Berklee College of Music. He graduated cum laude in 1997. Bromfman worked as a session musician, arranger and music producer, before his passion for film scores brought him to California. He studied film scoring at UCLA, after releasing his first solo album, Pé-de-Moleque, in 2000. The album featured some of the best Brazilian instrumentalists, including Sebastião Tapajós, Carlos Malta, Marcelo Martins and Ney Conceição. Pedro Bromfman started his career as a Film/TV composer in 2002, creating music for trailers and commercials. Soon after, he started composing for films and television. More recently, Pedro has been working extensively on video game scores, he is currently creating the music for Far Cry 6.

=== Poker ===
Bromfman is also a poker player. He earned a World Series of Poker bracelet and $294,616 by winning the $10,000 No-Limit 2-7 Lowball Draw Championship in 2022.

== Filmography ==
=== Films ===
Year	Title	Director	Notes
2003	Tres delincuentes	Nathan Clay; Eduardo Enrique Mayén	Short film
2004	L.A. Dream	William Olsson	Short film
2005	The Yawn Jar	Alvaro Ron	Short film
2005	Fuga y misterio	Martin Mourin	Short film
2006	Between the Lines	Anisha Pattanaik	—N/a
2006	Rosa	William Olsson	Short film
2007	Elite Squad	José Padilha	—N/a
2007	Days of Fight	Eduardo Brand	—N/a
2008	Alucinados	Roberto Santucci	—N/a
2008	They Killed Sister Dorothy	Daniel Junge	—N/a
2010	March of the Living	Jessica Sanders	—N/a
2010	Elite Squad: The Enemy Within	José Padilha	—N/a
2011	Qualquer Gato Vira-Lata	Tomas Portella	—N/a
2011	Linus & Cori (Ten Years Later)	Alvaro Ron; Nacho Manubens	Short film
2012	G-Dog	Freida Lee Mock	—N/a
2013	Maria Bonita	Jacob Lundgaard Andersen; Gareth Dunnet-Alcocer; Camille Stochitch	Short film
2014	RoboCop	José Padilha	—N/a
2014	Rio, I Love You	José Padilha	—N/a
2014	Blue Lips	Daniela De Carlo; Julieta Lima; Gustavo Lipsztein	—N/a
2015	Deep Web	Alex Winter	—N/a
2016	Em Nome da Lei	Sergio Rezende	—N/a
2016	Relatively Free	Alex Winter	Short film
2017	Thumper	Jordan Ross	—N/a
2018	The Panama Papers	Alex Winter	—N/a
2019	The Blackout	Daniela De Carlo	—N/a
2021	The Cocktail Party	Jessica Sanders	Short film

=== Television ===
Year	Title	Notes
2003–2005	SportsCentury	2 episodes
2016	Paradise Inc.	2 episodes
2015–2017	Narcos	30 episodes
2017	The Story of Us with Morgan Freeman	6 episodes
2018	Chain of Command	8 episodes

=== Video games ===
Year	Title	Notes
2012	Max Payne 3	Additional production Additional performances Original score composed by Health
2019	Need for Speed Heat	—N/a
2021	Far Cry 6	—N/a

== Awards and nominations ==
=== Awards ===
- ASCAP Award:
  - 2015 – RoboCop
- Park City Film Music Festival:
  - 2009 – Elite Squad – Jury Choice Gold Medal for Excellence
  - 2009 – They Killed Sister Dorothy – Audience Choice Gold Medal for Excellence
  - 2008 – Elite Squad – Premio Guarani (Melhor Trilha Sonora)

=== Nominations ===
- Cinema Brazil Grand Prize:
  - 2008 – Elite Squad – Best Original Music (Melhor Trilha Sonora Original)
  - 2011 – Elite Squad 2 – Best Original Music (Melhor Trilha Sonora Original)
- ACIE Awards:
  - 2011 – Elite Squad – Best Music (Melhor Trilha Sonora)
- Prêmio Contigo Cinema:
  - 2008 – Elite Squad – Best Music (Melhor Trilha Sonora)
