= Guarapo =

Guarapo or guarapa (Portuguese: garapa) may refer to:

- Sugarcane juice
- For the palm-tree sap also known as guarapo, see Miel de palma
- Guarapo (drink) a fermented alcoholic drink in Latin American cuisine
- Guarapo, a 1989 film of Juan Luis Galiardo
- Garapa (film), a 2009 film by José Padilha
