= Elite da Tropa =

Book by André Batista

- Author: André Batista; Rodrigo Pimentel; Luiz Eduardo Soares
- Language: Portuguese
- Genre: Biography
- Publication place: Brazil
- Media type: Print (Paperback)
- Pages: 312
- ISBN: 8573027738

Elite da Tropa is a Brazilian book written by the ex-police officers André Batista and Rodrigo Pimentel together with Luiz Eduardo Soares. It was first published in 2006. The book originated the film Elite Squad.

== Synopsis ==
Based on real facts, this book recounts stories about the Batalhão de Operações Policiais Especiais (BOPE), considered an elite squad in Rio de Janeiro's Military Police. The book depicts the officers from BOPE as an incorruptible and extremely violent troop.

This book also describes the plan to assassinate Leonel Brizola, the then governor of Rio de Janeiro.
