= César Charlone (cinematographer) =

Uruguayan cinematographer

- Born: 1950 (age 75–76); Montevideo, Uruguay
- Years active: 1985–present
- Organization: Academy of Motion Picture Arts and Sciences

César Charlone (born February 20, 1950) is a Uruguayan cinematographer and director.

== Life and career ==
He was born in Montevideo, but lives in Brazil.

In 2003, he was nominated for the Academy Award for Best Cinematography for his work on City of God.

== Filmography ==
=== Director ===
Film

Year	Title	Director	Writer	Producer	Notes
2007	The Pope's Toilet	Yes	Yes	No	Co-directed with Enrique Fernández
2011	Artigas: La Redota	Yes	Yes	Yes	
2014	Rio, I Love You	Uncredited	No	No	Segment "The Muse"
2023	Partido	Yes	No	Yes	Co-directed with Sebastián Bednarik and Joaquim Castro

Television

Year	Title	Notes
2002-2017	City of Men	Directed 3 episodes, wrote 2 episodes
2013	Destino	Episode "Ileana Quer Casar... Ainda."
2016	3%	3 episodes

=== Cinematographer ===
==== Film ====
Year	Title	Director	Notes
1985	Aqueles Dois	Sergio Amon	
1986	The Man in the Black Cape	Sérgio Rezende	
1987	Feliz Ano Velho	Roberto Gervitz	
1989	Doida Demais	Sérgio Rezende	With Antonio Luiz Mendes and Antonio Luis Soares
1996	How Angels Are Born	Murilo Salles	
2002	City of God	Fernando Meirelles; Kátia Lund	
2005	The Constant Gardener	Fernando Meirelles	
2007	The Pope's Toilet	Himself; Enrique Fernández	
2008	Blindness	Fernando Meirelles	
2011	Artigas: La Redota	Himself	With Fabio Burtin
2017	American Made	Doug Liman	
2019	The Two Popes	Fernando Meirelles	
2024	Mother Mother	K'naan Warsame	
2027	The Take	Fernando Meirelles	

Short film

Year	Title	Director	Notes
2008	Blackout	Daniel Rezende	
2014	The Muse	Fernando Meirelles	Segment of Rio, I Love You

==== Documentary film ====
Year	Title	Director	Notes
1985	Em Nome da Segurança Nacional	Renato Tapajós	With Adrian Cooper, José Roberto Eliezer and Zetas Malzoni
1995	Two Billion Hearts	Murilo Salles	With José Roberto Eliezer, Pedro Farkas, Lúcio Kodato and Carlos Pacheco
2000	Pierre Fatumbi Verger: Mensageiro Entre Dois Mundos	Lula Buarque de Hollanda	
2007	Stranded	Gonzalo Arijón	
2010	Futebol Brasileiro	Miki Kuretani	
2012	No Place on Earth	Janet Tobias	With Eduard Grau, Sean Kirby and Peter Simonite

==== Television ====
Year	Title	Director	Notes
2000	Brava Gente	Mário Márcio Bandarra; Fernando Meirelles; Kátia Lund	Episode "Palace II"
2004	Sucker Free City	Spike Lee	TV movie
2009	Independent Lens	Gonzalo Arijon	Episode "Stranded: The Andes Plane Crash Survivors"
2012	Destino	Alex Gabassi; Fábio Mendonça	3 episodes
2024	Sugar	Fernando Meirelles	5 episodes

== Awards and nominations ==
Year	Award	Category	Title	Result
2002	Academy Awards	Best Cinematography	City of God	Nominated
2005	BAFTA Awards	Best Cinematography	The Constant Gardener	Nominated
2005	Satellite Awards	Best Cinematography	The Constant Gardener	Won
