= Battalion of Special Police Operations =

Brazilian military police tactical unit

Battalion of Special Police Operations Batalhão de Operações Policiais Especiais
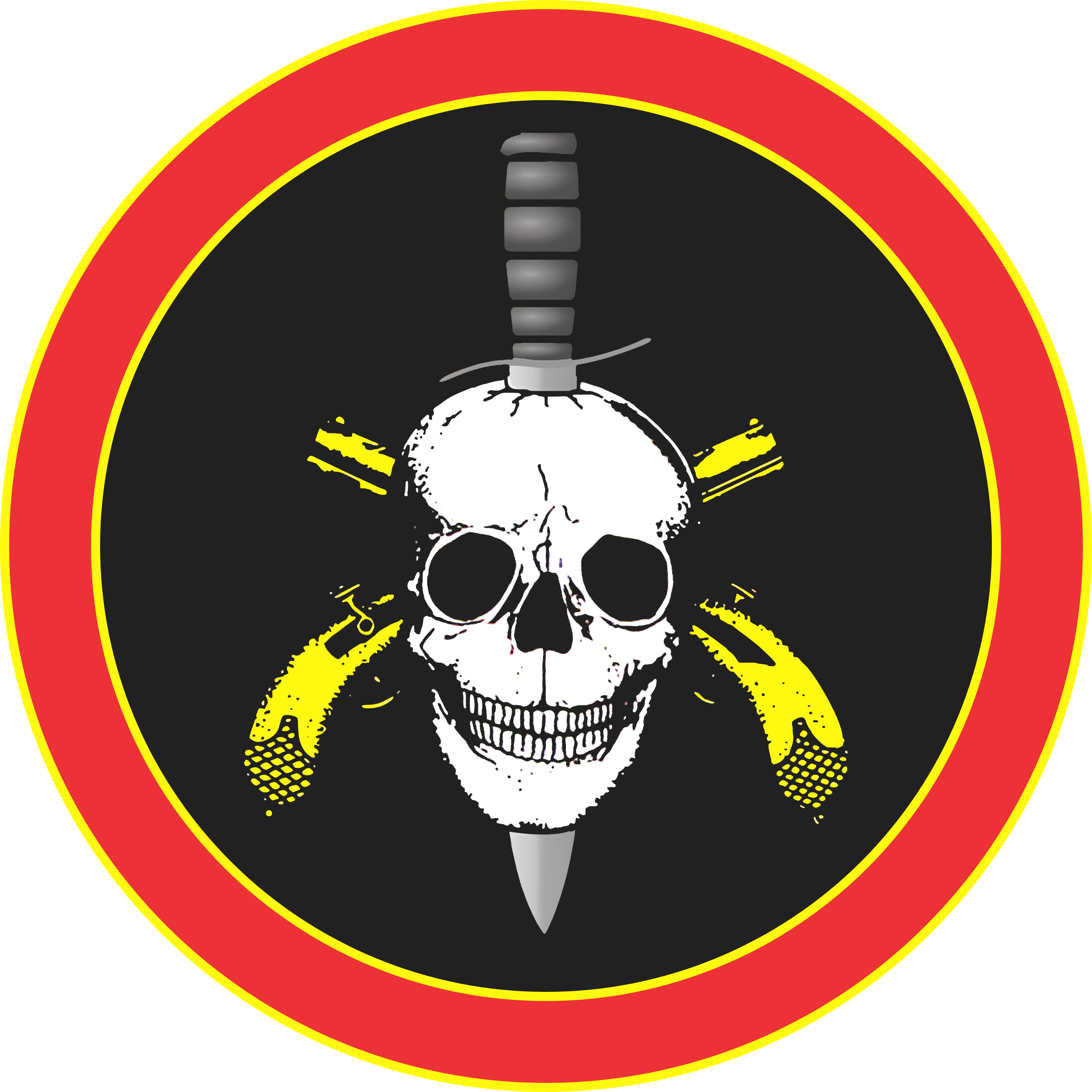
- Patch & Beret Badge

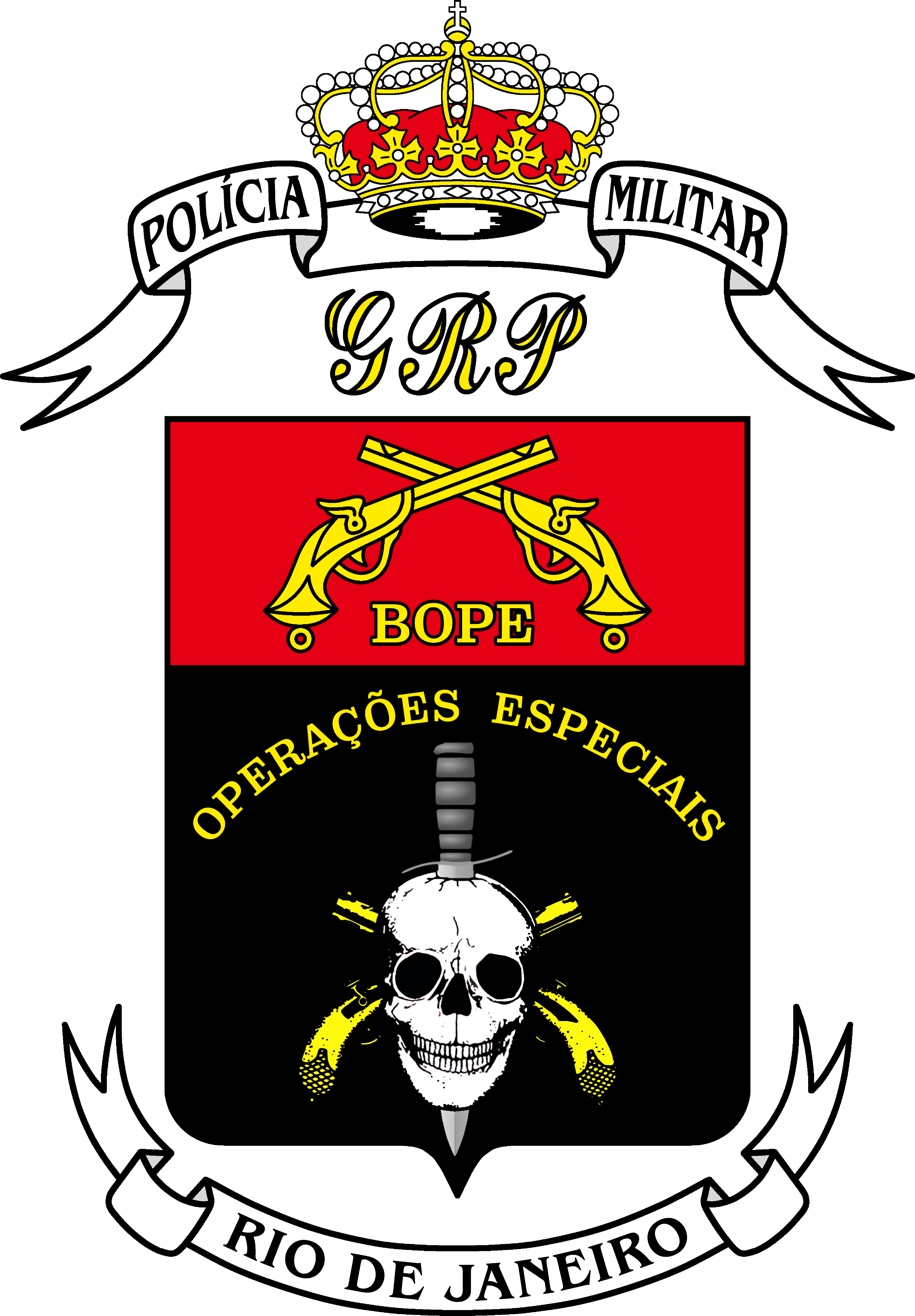
- Coat of arms
- Common name: BOPE
- Motto: Faca na Caveira; Knife in the Skull / Victory Over Death

Agency overview
- Formed: January 19, 1978; 48 years ago

Jurisdictional structure
- Operations jurisdiction: Rio de Janeiro, Brazil
- Location of the State of Rio de Janeiro in Brazil
- Legal jurisdiction: Rio de Janeiro
- Governing body: Military Police of Rio de Janeiro State

Operational structure
- Agency executive: Lieutenant Colonel Marcelo de Castro Corbage, Commander
- Parent agency: Military Police of Rio de Janeiro State

The Battalion of Special Police Operations (Portuguese: Batalhão de Operações Policiais Especiais, BOPE) is the tactical unit of the Military Police of Rio de Janeiro State (PMERJ) in Brazil.

The BOPE was created in 1978 for PMERJ to have police officers who were specifically trained to act in hostage rescue operations and extreme risk situations. With time, BOPE had to do operations raiding favelas to combat Rio de Janeiro's growing drug traffickers and organized crime, and it soon became recognized as one of the world's best units in urban warfare. The unit was subject of the 2007 film Tropa de Elite (Elite Squad), which helped popularize the unit in Brazil and internationally, shaping public perceptions of its tactics and operational culture.

== Duties ==
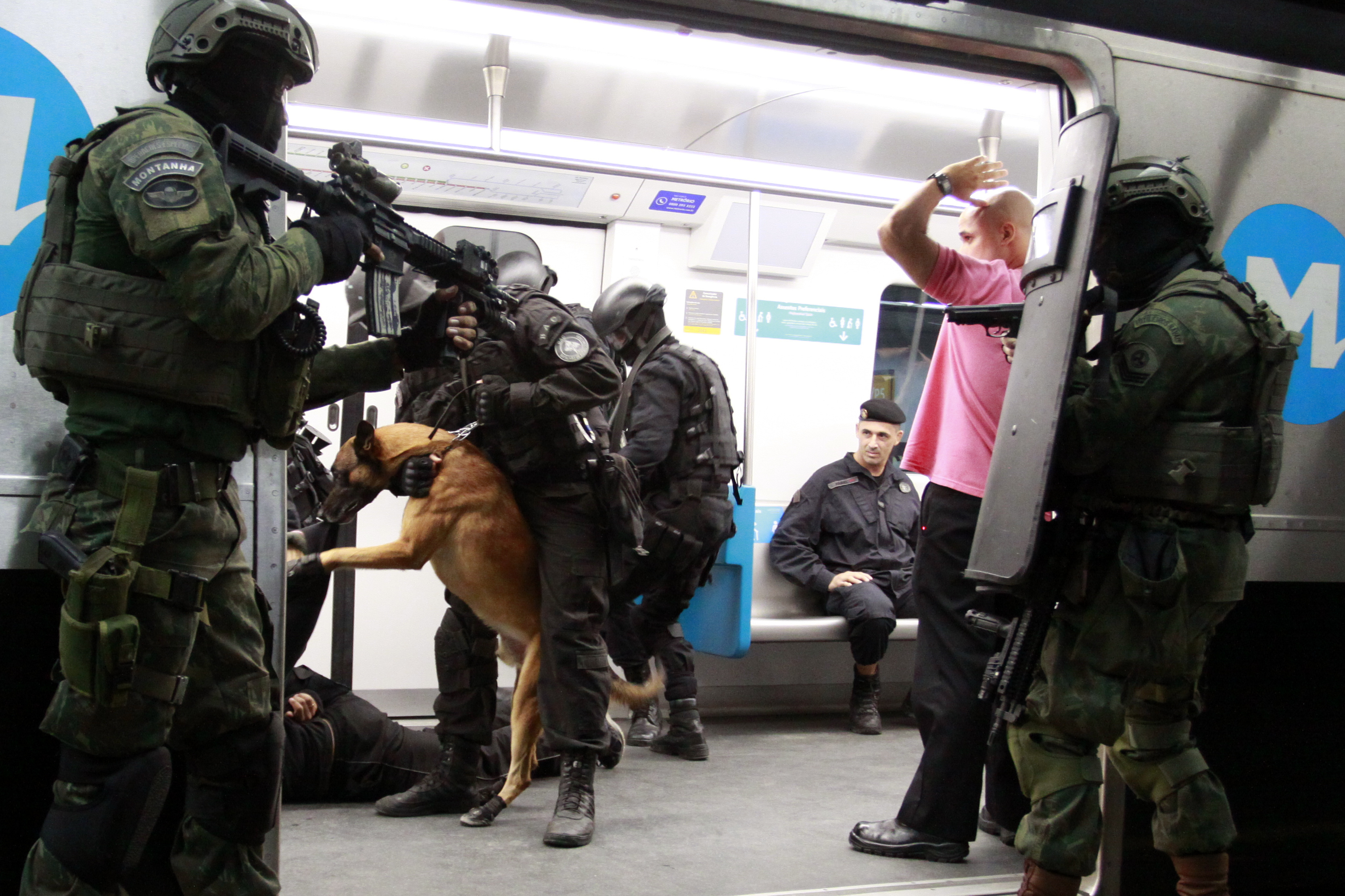
BOPE officers in a joint counter-terrorism exercise with COMANF.

The BOPE currently perform a number of roles, including:

- Providing additional security at special events;
- Break barricades constructed by drug traffickers;
- Shoot to kill at any criminal threatening either civilian or member life;
- Exterminate drug trafficking criminal factions and all of its members;
- Extract police officers or civilians injured in confrontations and combat;
- Rescuing officers and citizens captured by criminals or endangered by gunfire;
- Serve high-risk arrest warrants;
- Hostage rescue;
- Stabilising situations involving high-risk suicidal subjects;
- Suppress prison riots;
- Support civil police in combat of any kind;
- Providing superior assault firepower in certain situations;
- Armed patrols around the favelas;
- Special missions in swamps or mountainous terrains such as reconnaissance, planning and infiltration;
- Engage in combat-serving state sovereignty;
- Crime suppression;
- Resolving high-risk situations with minimal loss of life, injury, or property damage;
- Engage strongly armed criminal factions.

== Equipment ==
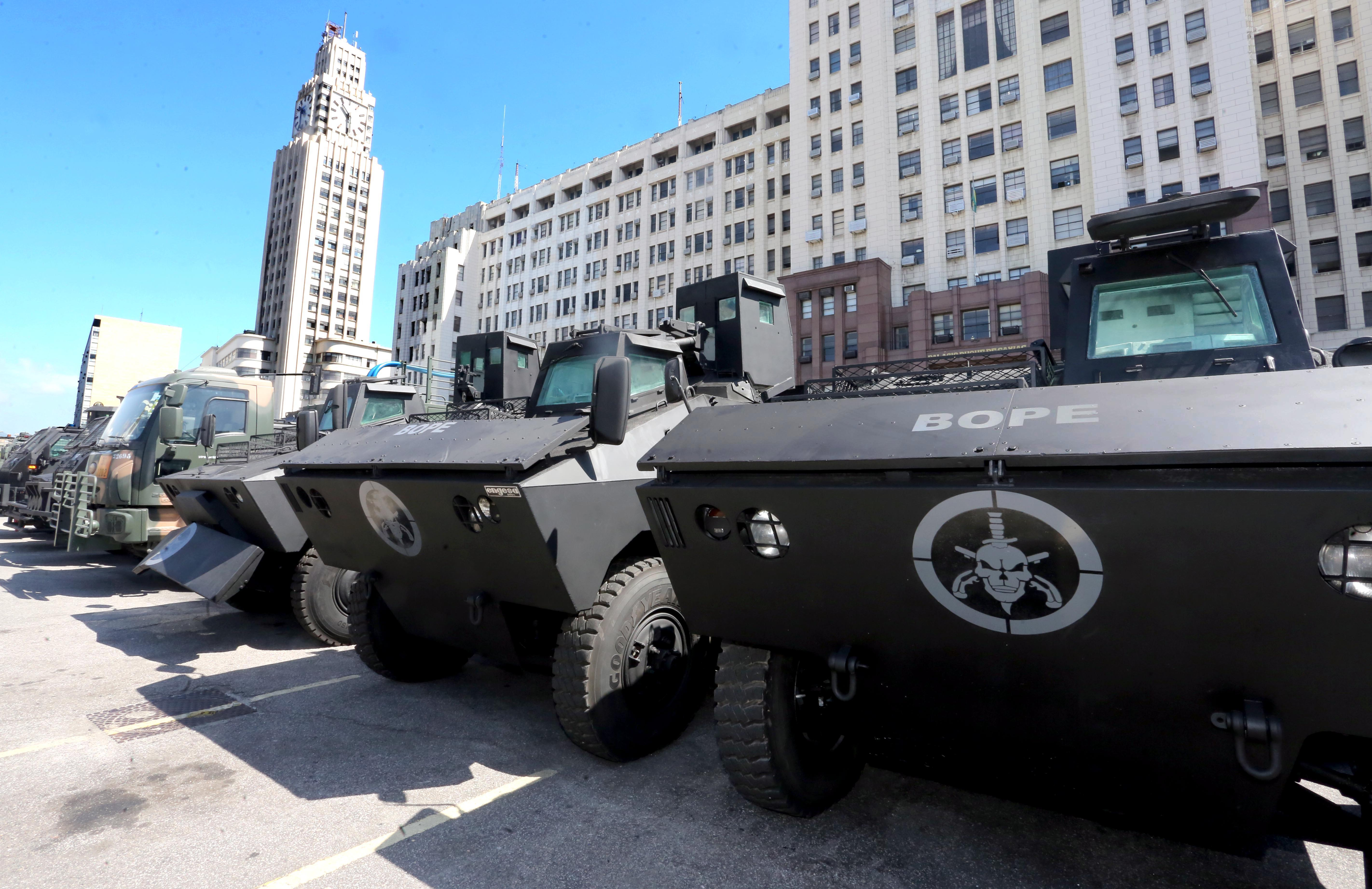
E-11 Urutu units in front of Duque de Caxias Palace and Central do Brasil, Rio de Janeiro.

Due to the nature of crime in favelas, BOPE units utilise equipment deemed more powerful than traditional civilian law enforcement, and have extensive experience in urban warfare as well as progression in confined and restricted environments.

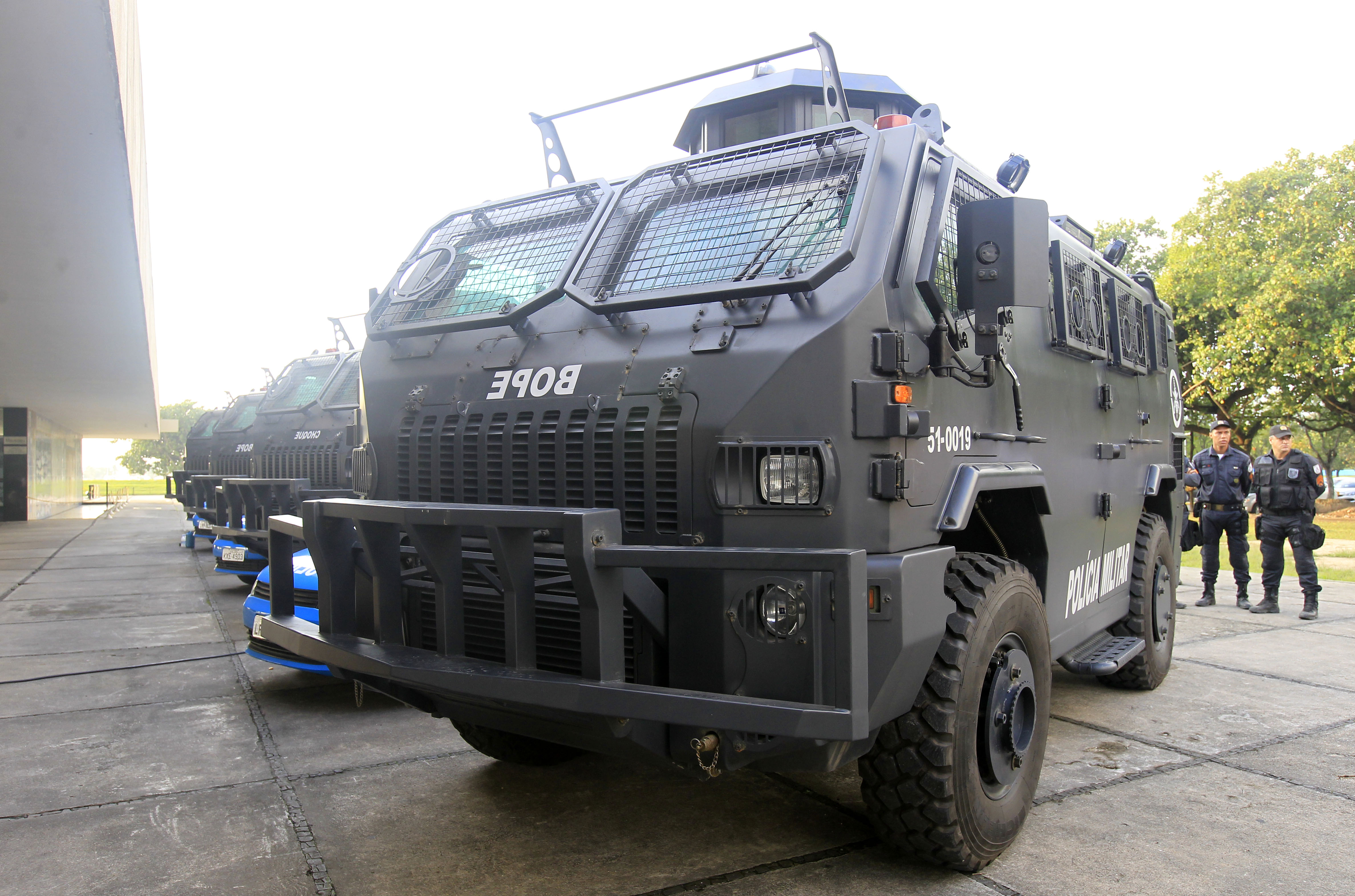
Paramount Maverick.

=== Small arms ===
BOPE soldiers are equipped with heavy armaments:

Model	Origin	Type
Taurus PT92	Brazil	Semi-automatic pistol
IMBEL 9mm	Brazil	Semi-automatic pistol
Heckler & Koch MP5	Germany	Submachine gun
FN P90	Belgium	Submachine gun
Benelli M3	Italy	Shotgun
IMBEL MD97	Brazil	Assault rifle
M1 carbine	United States	Assault rifle
M4 carbine	United States	Assault rifle
M16 rifle	United States	Assault rifle
M727 carbine	United States	Assault rifle
Armalite AR-10A4	United States	Assault rifle
Heckler & Koch G3	West Germany	Assault rifle
FN FAL	Belgium	Assault rifle
FN PARA FAL	Belgium	Assault rifle
Heckler & Koch PSG1	West Germany	Sniper rifle
Heckler & Koch HK21	West Germany	Machine gun
Browning M2	United States	Machine gun

=== Vehicles ===
The force has a fleet of armoured fighting vehicles, which are known as "Pacificador" ("Peacemaker"), or "Caveirão" ("Big Skull") and one UH-1 Huey.

These vehicles are used in operations in the slums (favelas) where BOPE face intense conflicts with heavily armed drug dealers.

=== Uniform ===
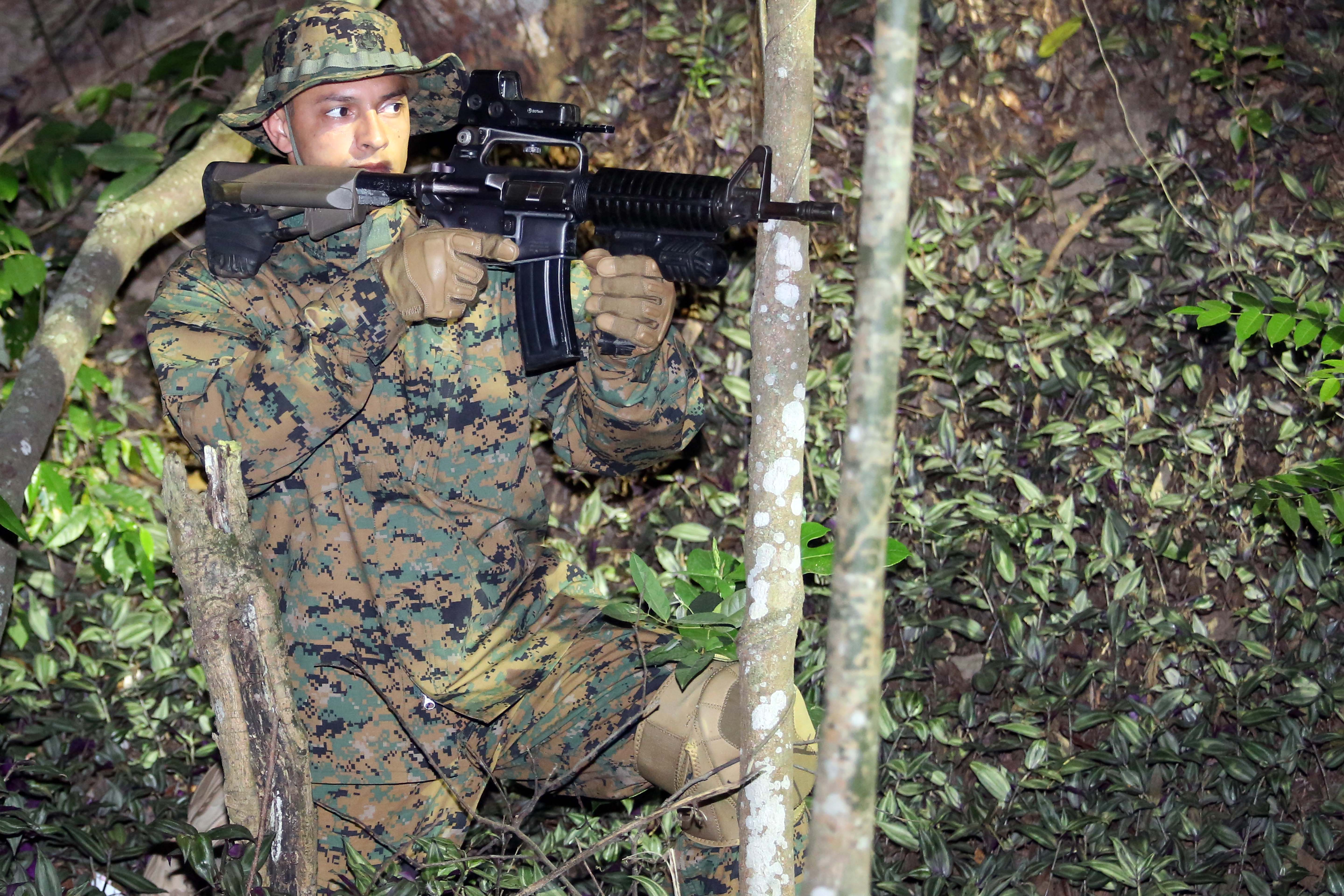
BOPE operator with MARPAT fatigues

BOPE initially used black fatigues, which with time would become the trademark of the unit. In 2016, BOPE adopted the MARPAT camouflage pattern as its main uniform, which would help BOPE operators in operations in favelas and woodland environments, leaving black as mostly a ceremonial color.

=== Miscellaneous ===
BOPE also operates a wheel loader in order to remove obstacles, barricades and street blockades.

== Controversy ==
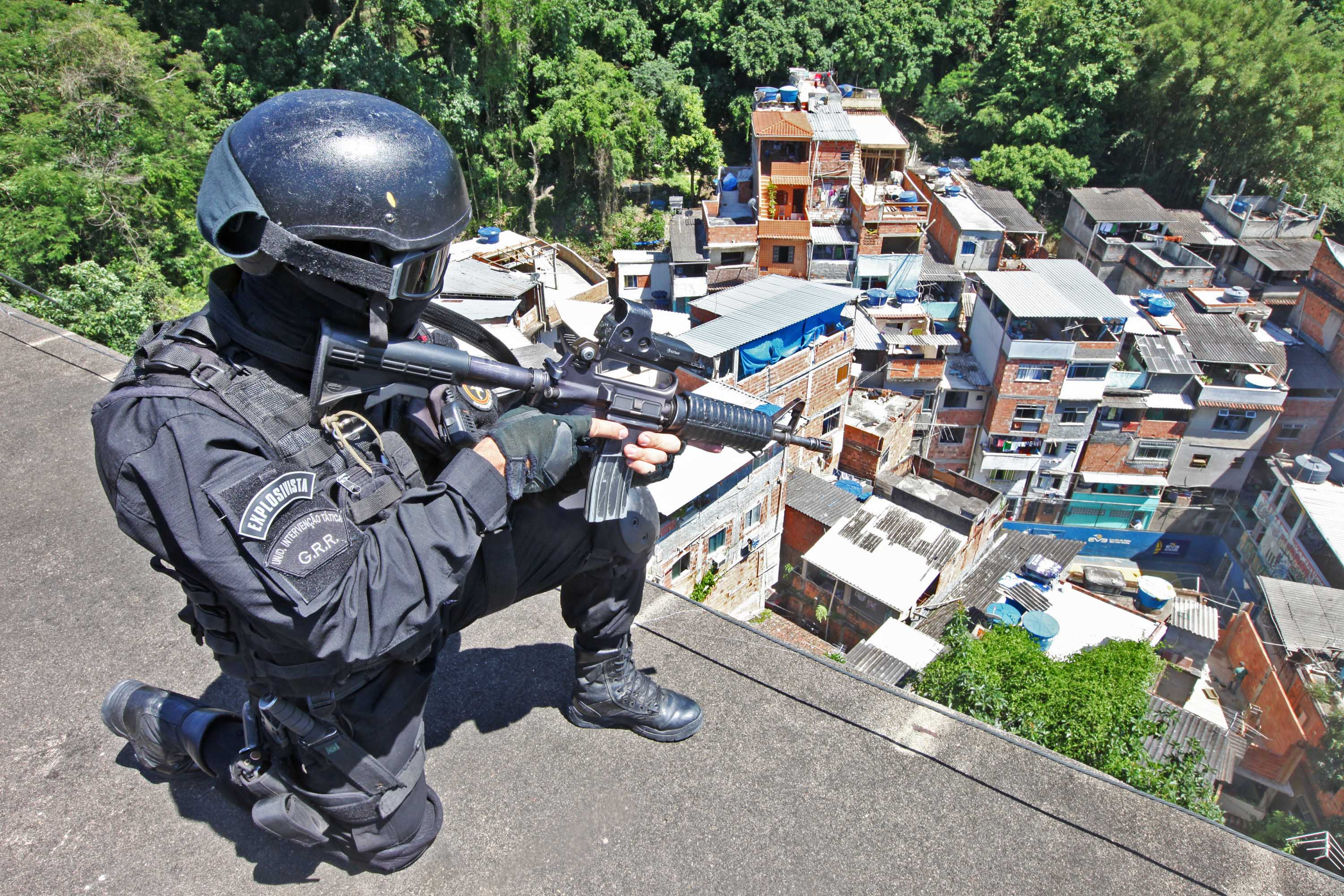
BOPE Operator during training

BOPE has generated notoriety due to their role in the violent drug war in the favelas of Rio de Janeiro and they have been referred to as a "Death Squad" by multiple newspapers. One aspect that has been pointed out specifically is their logo, which bears a knife in a skull over crossed pistols (Portuguese: faca na caveira, lit. 'knife in the skull'). According to the official BOPE website, the knife in the skull symbolizes "victory over death" and the crossed pistols are the symbol of the military police.

A 2005 report on extra judicial executions by the New York University School of Law indicated that BOPE was involved in the deaths of 4 teenagers under the pretext that they were drug traffickers who were resisting arrest:

BOPE officers falsified the crime scene in order to incriminate the victims. Hoping this way to make them appear to be gang members. No weapon was found on any of the victims. None of them had any previous history of criminal activity.

Amnesty International declared that "the police forces in Brazil adopt violent and repressive methods. These cause violations of fundamental rights of large parts of the population on a regular basis", and attributes a certain number of killed civilians to BOPE in particular. In March 2006, Amnesty International specifically condemned the use of vans with armoured plating, known as a Caveirão. It stated that deploying the vehicle aggressively, indiscriminately targeting whole communities, highlighted the ineffectiveness of excessive use of force.

BOPE "played a central role" in the 2025 Operation Containment. A purchase of rifles from a United States company by the unit was objected to by then ambassador Elizabeth Bagley with a memo describing the unit as "among the most notorious police units in Brazil in regard to killings of civilians" previously, the unit had imported at least 800 rifles from the United States.

== Similar named police units ==
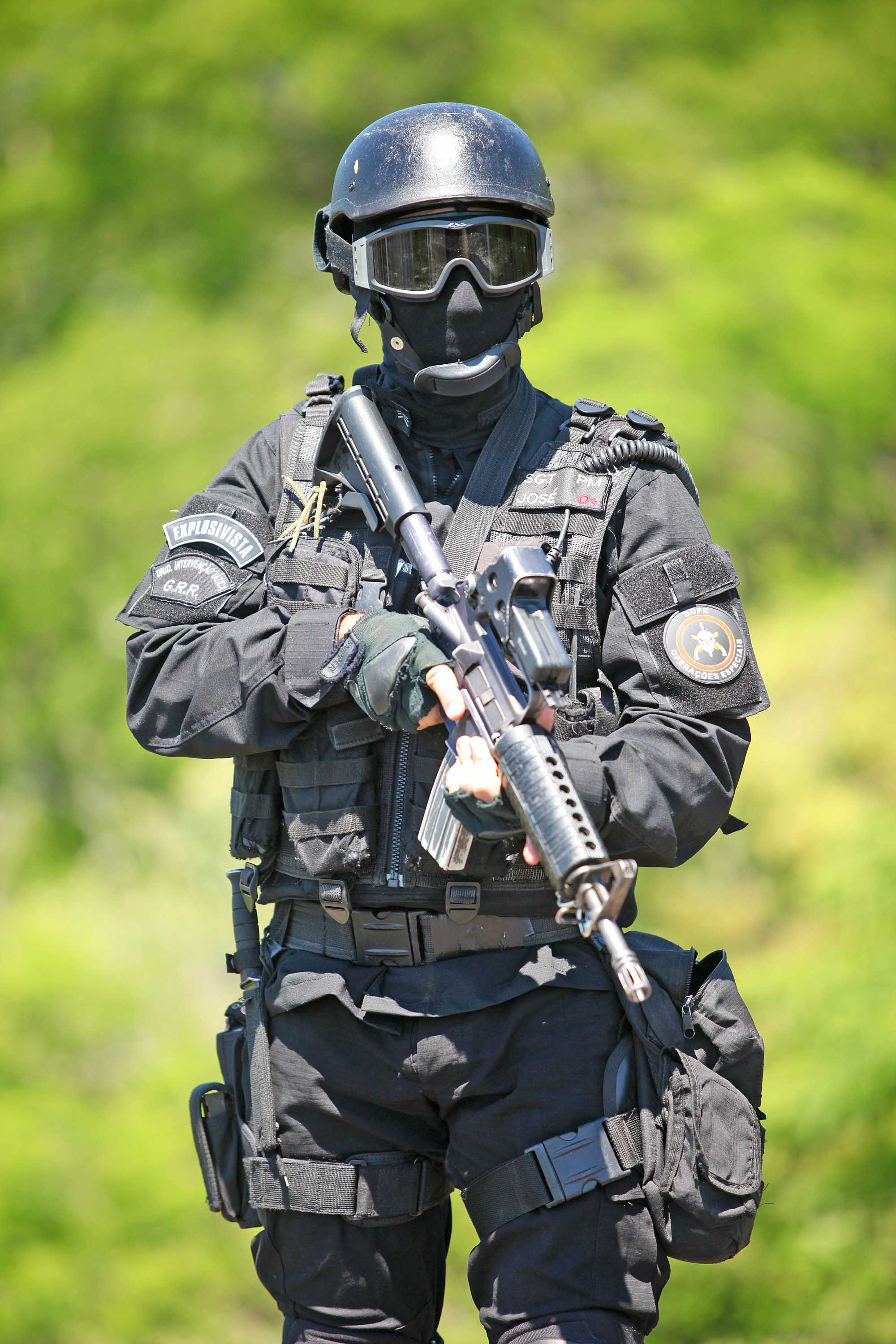
Due to the 2016 Summer Olympics, BOPE has received considerably more investments from the Brazilian government.

Military Police of Alagoas, Pernambuco, Rio Grande do Sul and Santa Catarina states also call their tactical units BOPE, while the military police of the Federal District and Piauí states call their forces "Special Operations Battalion(s)" ("Batalhão de Operações Especiais" or "BOE").

BOpE or BOPE are acronyms that can refer to the following specialized military police units:

=== BOpE (Batalhão de Operações Especiais) units ===
- Special Operations Battalion (PMAC) – in Acre
- Special Operations Battalion (PMDF) – in the Federal District
- Specials Battalion Operations (PMMT) – in the state of Mato Grosso
- Special Operations Battalion (PMPR) – the state of Paraná
- Special Operations Battalion (PMPI) – the state of Piauí

=== BOPE (Batalhão de Operações Policiais Especiais) units ===
- Special Police Operations Battalion (PMBA) – the state of Bahia
- Special Police Operations Battalion (PMAL) – the state of Alagoas
- Special Police Operations Battalion (PMRR) – in the state of Roraima
- Special Police Operations Battalion (PMSC) – the state of Santa Catarina
- Special Police Operations Battalion (PMERJ) – in the state of Rio de Janeiro
- Special Police Operations Battalion (PMRN) – in Rio Grande do Norte state

== In popular culture ==
In 2006, the book Elite da Tropa was published. Written by sociologist Luiz Eduardo Soares and two BOPE officers, Major André Batista and Captain Rodrigo Pimentel, it provides a semi-fictional account of the daily routine of BOPE as well as some historical events, based on the experiences of the latter two. It describes BOPE as a "killing machine" and details an alleged aborted assassination attempt by some police officers on then-governor Leonel Brizola. The book was controversial at the time of release, and reportedly resulted in Batista being reprimanded and censored by the Military Police. The book has been made into a movie, Tropa de Elite (Elite Squad), directed by José Padilha (the director of Bus 174), with a screenplay by Academy Award-nominated screenwriter Bráulio Mantovani. In 2010 the movie gained a sequel, Elite Squad: The Enemy Within.

Two BOPE operators make an appearance in Tom Clancy's Rainbow Six Siege as playable operators. These operators are Capitão (Captain) and Caveira (Skull).

OPES is a Brazilian special police unit in the South Korean online 2007 first-person shooter Crossfire. The OPES logo features a skull and a knife similar to that of the BOPE. The OPES were introduced with the release of the 2011 Brazilian release of the game.

BOPE is featured on Season 1, Episode 2 of Elite World Cops, a television show hosted by former SAS soldier and author Chris Ryan.

The UFE, one of the main antagonist factions that the protagonist Max goes up against in Max Payne 3, are based on the BOPE with many of them violating fundamental rights of civilians and using violent and lethal actions against denizens of favelas.

== See also ==
- Military Police of Rio de Janeiro State
- Pacifying Police Unit
- GATE and COE (São Paulo Military Police)
- ROTA (São Paulo Military Police)
- National Force of Public Safety (Brazilian federal special response unit)
- COT (Brazilian Federal Police)
- List of police tactical units
- Eastern Military Command, also known as Duque de Caxias Palace
