= Titi Müller =

Brazilian blogger, television presenter and actress

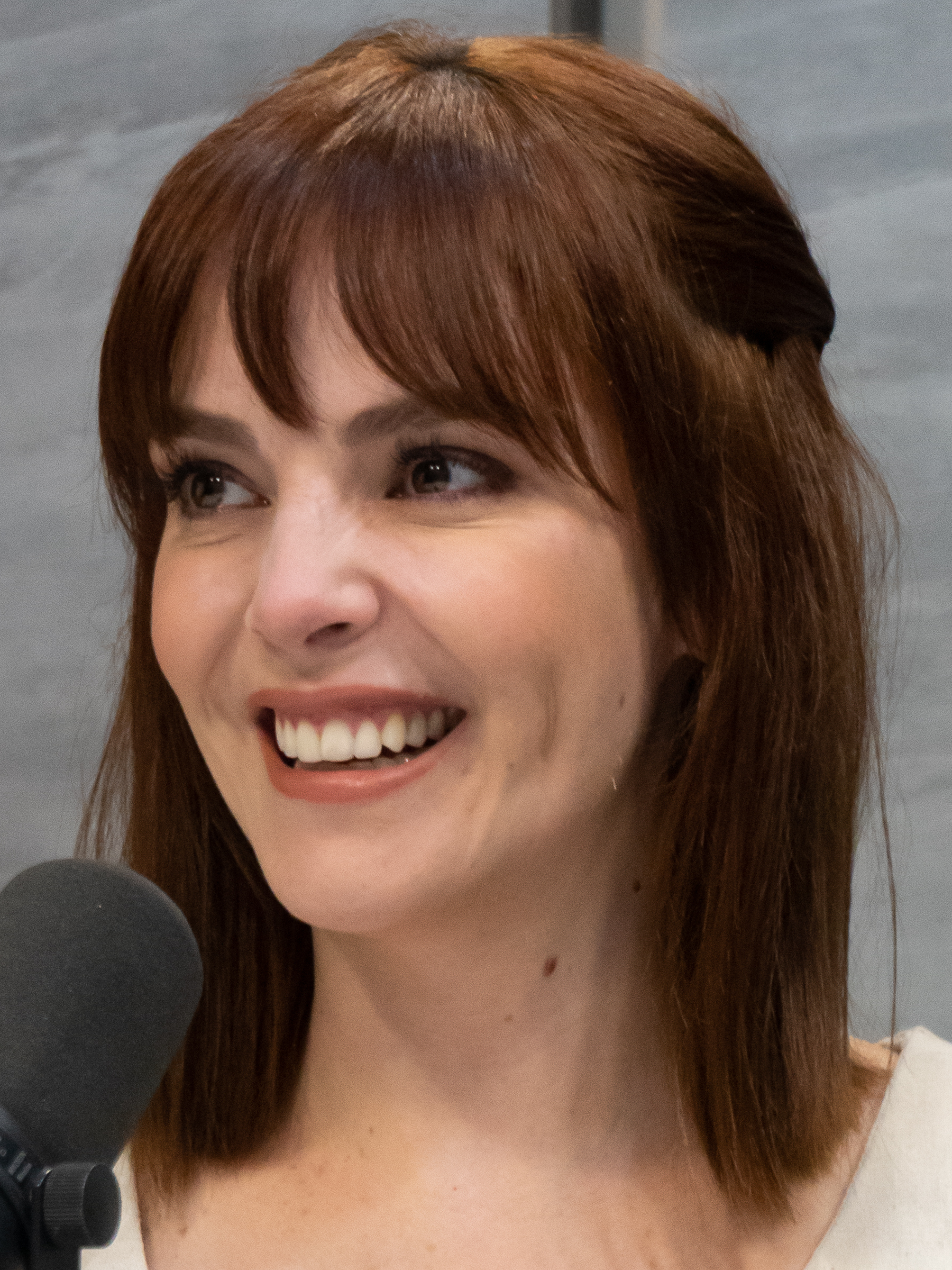
- Müller in 2023
- Born: Tielen Müller; 23 September 1986 (age 38); Porto Alegre, Rio Grande do Sul, Brazil
- Citizenship: brazilian
- Years active: 2009–present
- Spouse: Tomas Bertoni
- Children: Benjamim
- Relatives: Tainá Müller (sister)

Tielen Müller, best known as Titi Müller (born September 23, 1986) is a Brazilian blogger, television presenter and actress.

== Filmography ==
=== Television ===
Year	Program	Broadcasting station	Notes
2009	Podsex	MTV Brasil	Television presenter
2009-2010	Viva! MTV	MTV Brasil	Television presenter
2010-2013	Acesso MTV	MTV Brasil	Television presenter
2012-2013	Jovem Pan Morning Show	Jovem Pan FM	Television presenter
2012-2013	MTV Sem Vergonha	MTV Brasil	Television presenter
2013	Mochilão MTV	MTV Brasil	Television presenter
2013	Rock in Rio 2013	Multishow	Television presenter
2014-2016	Anota Aí	Multishow	Television presenter

=== Cinema ===
Year	Title	Role
2014	Do Lado de Fora	Marília (Mah)
