= Enrique Fernández (director) =

Uruguayan film director

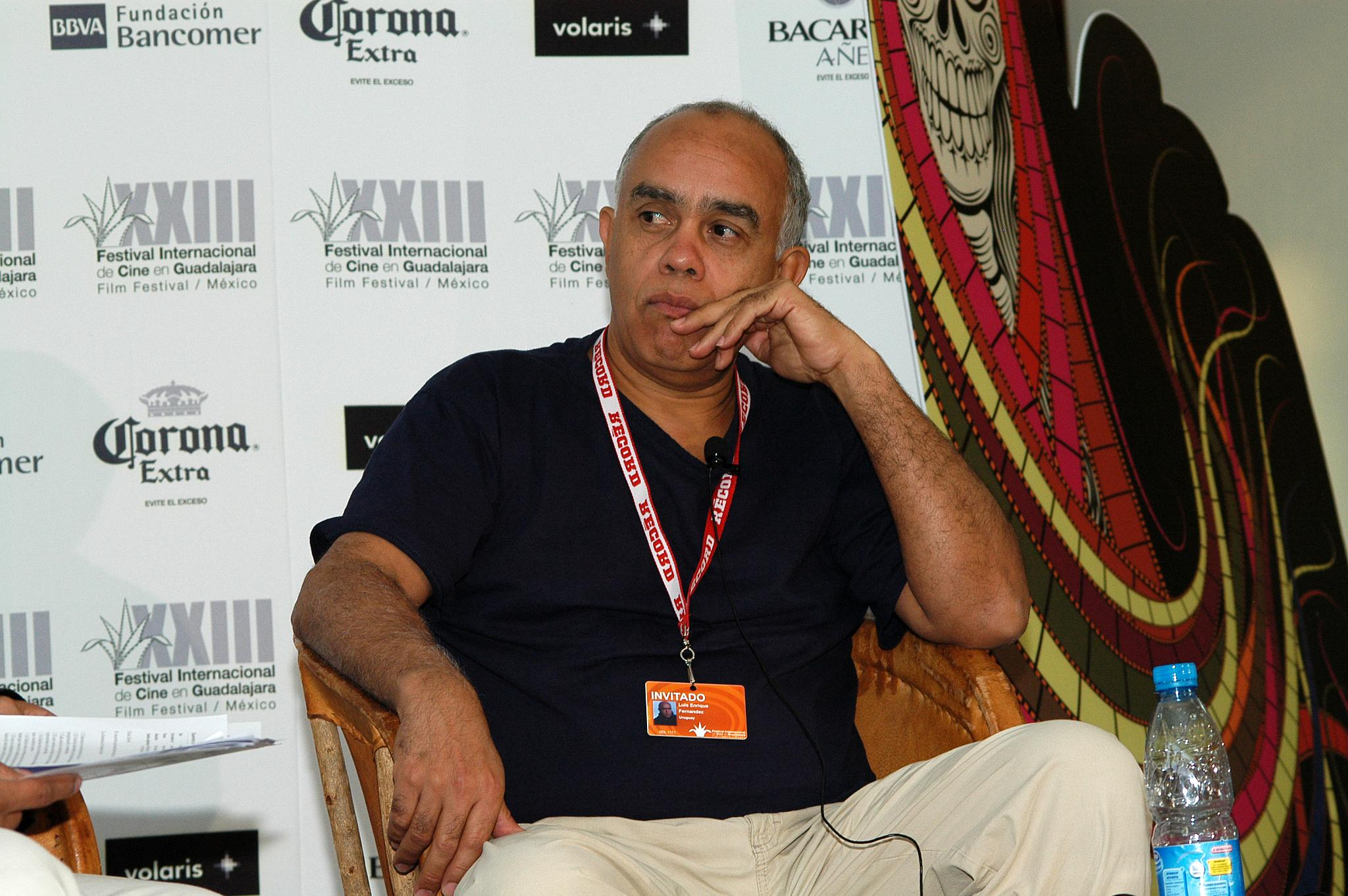

Enrique Fernández (born 11 March 1953 as Luis Enrique Fernández Marta in Melo, Uruguay) is a Uruguayan film director. He became famous for the 2007 film The Pope's Toilet, which he directed together with César Charlone.
