= Destino (Brazilian TV series) =

- Genre: Drama
- Written by: Fábio Mendonça; Teodoro Poppovic
- Directed by: Alex Gabassi; Fábio Mendonça
- Country of origin: Brazil
- Original languages: Portuguese; English; Spanish; Korean
- No. of seasons: 3
- No. of episodes: 18

Production
- Running time: 42 minutes
- Production company: O2 Filmes

Original release
- Network: HBO Latin America
- Release: November 25, 2012

Destino is a drama anthology television series that premiered on the Brazilian branch of the HBO Latin America. The series was produced by O2 Filmes, and directed by Alex Gabassi and Fábio Mendonça. It first aired on November 25, 2012.

The series consists of episodes focusing on the lives of immigrants in the Brazilian cities of São Paulo, Rio de Janeiro and Salvador. Each episode follows the life of a different group, portraying the frustrations, joys, and culture shock they face daily. Most of the characters are played by immigrants who were selected for the production, playing with their native language.

== Episodes ==
Season	Episodes	Originally released
1	6	November 25, 2012
2	6	December 21, 2013
3	6	January 7, 2018

== See also ==
- Immigration to Brazil
