= Cuiabá Film and Video Festival =

The Cuiabá Film and Video Festival (Portuguese: Festival de Cinema e Vídeo de Cuiabá) is a national Brazilian film and video festival held in Cuiabá that exhibits audiovisual productions from Brazil and Latin America. It was first held in 1992 and had its 19th edition in 2014.
