= The Pope's Toilet =

- Promotional release poster
- Directed by: César Charlone; Enrique Fernandez
- Written by: César Charlone; Enrique Fernandez
- Produced by: Bel Berlinck; Claudia Büschel; Serge Catoire; Fernando Meirelles; Elena Roux; Sandino Saravia Vinay
- Starring: César Troncoso; Virginia Méndez; Mario Silva
- Cinematography: César Charlone
- Edited by: Gustavo Giani
- Music by: Lucianno Supervielle
- Release date: 2007
- Running time: 90 minutes
- Countries: Uruguay; Brazil; France
- Language: Spanish

The Pope's Toilet (Spanish: El Baño del Papa) is a 2007 Uruguayan film directed by César Charlone and Enrique Fernandez, starring César Troncoso, Virginia Méndez, and Mario Silva.

== Plot ==
It is 1988, and Melo, a Uruguayan town on the Brazilian border, awaits the visit of Pope John Paul II. Numbers begin circulating: hundreds of people will come, thousands say the media. To the poor citizens of Melo this means pilgrims in need of food and drink, paper flags, souvenirs, and commemorative medals. Brimming with enthusiasm, the locals hope not only for divine blessing but also a small share of material happiness. Petty smuggler Beto is certain that he's found the best business idea of all: "The Pope’s Toilet", where the thousands of visiting pilgrims can find relief.

Beto is thwarted by lack of funds and the local mobile customs enforcement officer. Ultimately the promised "60,000 to 200,000" Brazilians do not materialise. Apparently (in the film's postscript) only 400 Brazilians came, disproportionately served by 387 stalls for food and trinkets. The film makes it clear that the visit was a financial disaster to the town rather than bringing any wealth as promised. Beto has spent his daughter's college fund to no avail, but she forgives him, and at least he has a nice toilet.

Regardless of the claims made in the film's postscript committed to uphold a good sense of humor at all costs, international media reported the Pope's open-air mass in the town of Melo with 39,000 inhabitants was attended by a crowd of about 50,000 people.

== Cast ==
- César Troncoso as Beto
- Virginia Méndez as Carmen
- Virginia Ruiz as Silvia
- Mario Silva as Valvulina
- Henry de Leon as Nacente
- Jose Arce as Tica
- Nelson Lence as Meleyo
- Rosário dos Santos as Tereza
- Hugo Blandamuro as Tartamudo

== Release ==
The film was Uruguay's submission to the 80th Academy Awards for the Academy Award for Best Foreign Language Film, but was not accepted as a nominee. It is available in the United States from filmmovement.com.

BBC Four premiered the film on British television on 1 August 2010.

== See also ==
- Cinema of Uruguay
- List of submissions to the 80th Academy Awards for Best Foreign Language Film
