= Luiz Eduardo Soares =

Brazilian anthropologist and author

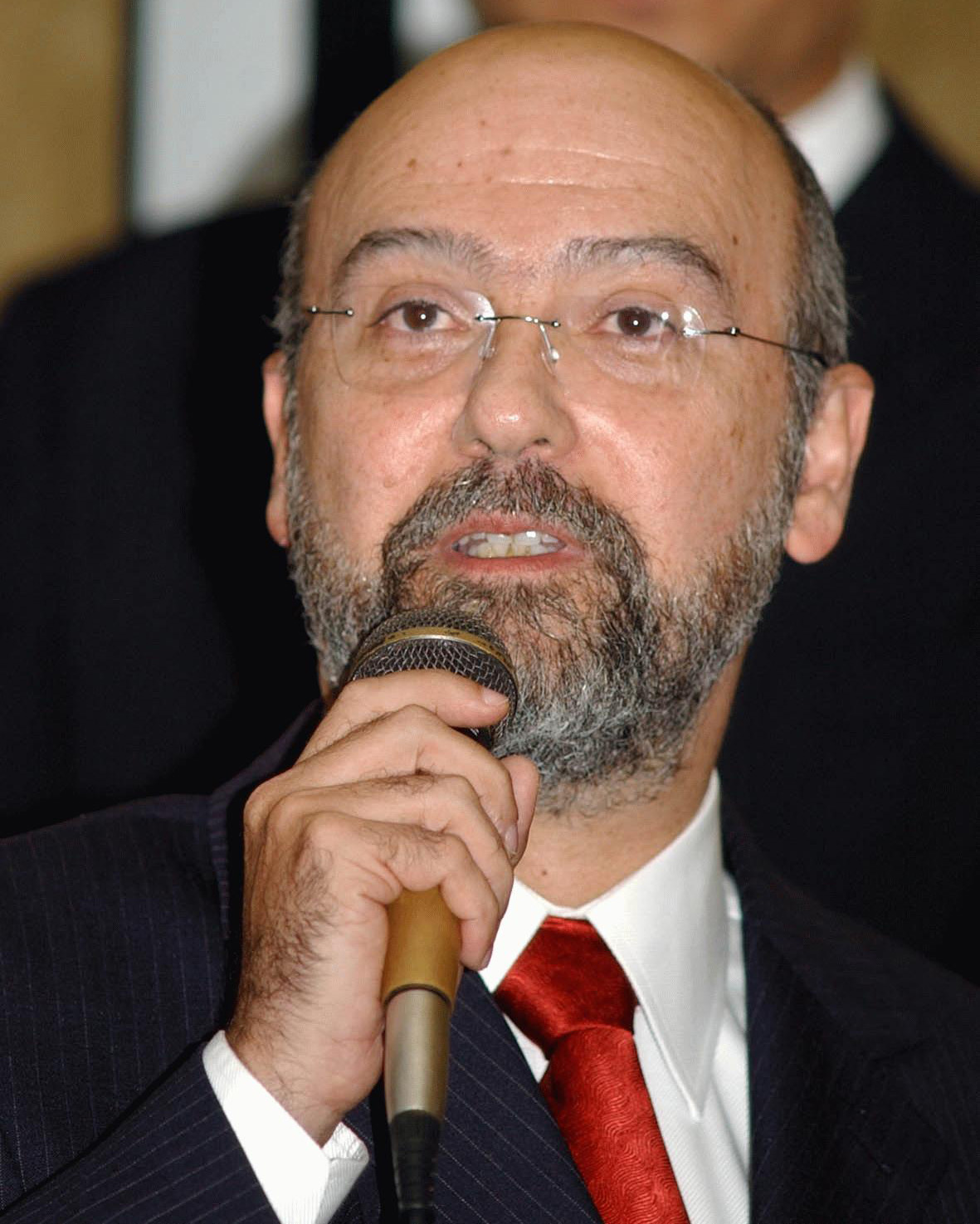
Luiz Eduardo Soares

Luiz Eduardo Soares (born March 12, 1954, in Nova Friburgo, Rio de Janeiro), is a Brazilian anthropologist, philosopher and political scientist.

== Activities ==
Between 1999 and 2000, Soares coordinated the department of public safety in Rio de Janeiro. Between January and October, 2003, he was the National Secretary of Public Security. Currently, he occupies the post of Secretary of Municipal Valuation of Life and Prevention of Violence at Nova Iguaçu (RJ). He is a professor at ESPM (School of Advertising and Marketing) in Rio de Janeiro.

He was also a professor at UERJ, Iuperj, Ucam and Unicamp, researcher at the ISER and at the Vera Institute of Justice, New York City, and a visiting professor at Columbia University, University of Virginia and University of Pittsburgh.

== Books ==
- Meu casaco de general: 500 dias no front da Segurança Pública do Estado do Rio de Janeiro. Cia. das Letras, 2000.
- Cabeça de porco (with MV Bill and Celso Athayde). Objetiva, 2005.
- Elite da Tropa (with André Batista and Rodrigo Pimentel). Objetiva, 2006.
- Segurança tem saída. Sextante, 2006.

== Journal articles ==
- Soares, Luiz Eduardo (2019). "Crime, Power, and Authoritarian Capitalism: A Dystopian Realism Experiment". Journal of Illicit Economies and Development. 1 (2): 243–250. doi:10.31389/jied.39. hdl:10419/320586.
