= Garapa (film) =

2009 film by José Padilha

- Directed by: José Padilha
- Produced by: Mariana Bentes; James Darcy; Luiza Dutra; José Padilha; Marcos Prado
- Starring: Sandro do Nascimento
- Cinematography: Marcela Bourseau
- Edited by: Felipe Lacerda; José Padilha
- Music by: Sacha Amback; João Nabuco
- Production company: Zazen Produções
- Distributed by: Downtown Filmes
- Release dates: 11 February 2009 (Berlin International Film Festival); 15 May 2009 (Brazil)
- Running time: 110 minutes
- Country: Brazil
- Language: Portuguese (Brazilian)

Garapa is a 2009 Brazilian documentary film directed by José Padilha.

It follows the daily lives of three families dealing with food insecurity in Fortaleza, the state capital of Ceará in the northeastern part of Brazil, over a few weeks in order to study hunger not merely from a macroscopic perspective but rather from the perspective of those who live with it. "Garapa" refers to sugar water given to children to tide them over in times of hunger. It was filmed in black and white by cinematographer Marcela Bourseau.

== Release ==
The film debuted at the Berlin International Film Festival on 11 February 2009. It then played at the Tribeca Film Festival on 25 April 2009 before its theatrical release in Brazil on 15 May 2009.

== Reception ==
Lidz-Ama Appiah of CNN wrote that "the film is a powerful illustration of the impact of chronic starvation."

Kirk Honeycutt of the Associated Press criticized the film's lack of background information about and discussion with its subjects, writing that "the film simply shows the families getting through the day without any concern for filling the audience in on their pasts, their relationships or what they think about their dire conditions. Padilha says he chose this approach to provoke empathy about hunger. But empathy requires understanding of people, not simply observing or pitying them. You don't, in fact, understand these people. You only understand their horrifying condition."
