= Elite Squad =

2007 film directed by José Padilha

- Theatrical release poster
- Directed by: José Padilha
- Written by: Bráulio Mantovani; José Padilha; Rodrigo Pimentel
- Based on: Elite da Tropa by André Batista; Luiz Eduardo Soares; Rodrigo Pimentel
- Produced by: José Padilha; Marcos Prado
- Starring: Wagner Moura; Caio Junqueira; André Ramiro
- Cinematography: Lula Carvalho
- Edited by: Daniel Rezende
- Music by: Pedro Bromfman
- Production companies: Zazen Produções; The Weinstein Company; Posto 9 Feijão Filmes
- Distributed by: Universal Studios
- Release dates: August 17, 2007 (Rio de Janeiro) (premiere): October 5, 2007
- Running time: 115 minutes
- Country: Brazil
- Language: Portuguese
- Budget: R$ 11 million (US$ 8 million)
- Box office: R$ 28 million (US$ 14.1 million)

Elite Squad (Portuguese: Tropa de Elite, pronounced [ˈtɾɔpɐ dʒi eˈlitʃi] lit. '"Elite Corps"') is a 2007 Brazilian crime film based on the novel Elite da Tropa by Luiz Eduardo Soares, André Batista, and Rodrigo Pimentel. Directed by José Padilha (from a screenplay by Padilha, Bráulio Mantovani, and Pimentel), the film stars Wagner Moura, Caio Junqueira, and André Ramiro, and tells the story of Roberto Nascimento (Moura), a captain in the Battalion of Special Police Operations who leads a police crackdown on a series of Rio de Janeiro favelas in-preparation for the 1997 Brazilian state visit of Pope John Paul II.

Inspired by the Military Police of Rio de Janeiro, and their related arms, Elite Squad is Padilha's second film, after the documentary Bus 174 (2002), and his first narrative feature. The film was a box office hit in Brazil and became a cultural phenomenon there. Elite Squad won the Golden Bear at the 2008 Berlin Film Festival, but received mixed critical reviews. Its sequel, Elite Squad: The Enemy Within, was released in Brazil on October 8, 2010, and holds industry records in the country for high ticket sales and gross revenue.

In 2015, the Brazilian Film Critics Association aka Abraccine voted Elite Squad the 30th greatest Brazilian film of all time, in its list of the 100 best Brazilian films.

== Plot ==
In 1997, Captain Roberto Nascimento of the Battalion of Special Police Operations (BOPE) leads an operation to secure the Turano neighbourhood before Pope John Paul II's overnight visit at the Archbishop's home near the favela. He searches for a successor at the unit in order to switch to a desk job before his pregnant wife Rosane gives birth to his son.

Rookie PMERJ officers and best friends André Matias and Neto Gouveia handle menial work as instructed to them by their corrupt seniors: Neto supervises the police auto mechanic shop, whilst André is responsible for registering and filing police complaints in a small archive office. André also attends law school, where he begins a relationship with Maria, and meets her friends Roberta and Edu; all three are members of a NGO that operates in an area ruled by drug lord Baiano. Baiano provides marijuana to André's friends, who sell it on campus. André also befriends Romerito, a boy who, like himself, suffers from myopia.

Neto applies to another department, but his transfer is denied. Disgusted by corruption and led by fellow officer Fábio, Neto and André steal the police's bribe money to fix as many police cars as possible. Their superior, Captain Oliveira, finds out and demotes them to kitchen work as punishment and orders Fábio – who he believes stole from him – to meet drug traffickers at a community funk party in Morro da Babilônia to enquire about payment. Fábio believes this is a set-up to kill him and discreetly warns Neto and André, who rush to a vantage point and, presuming Fabio will be shot by another officer, accidentally fire a sniper rifle, causing a deadly gunfight between the officers and traffickers; as André and Neto attempt to flee the scene, Nascimento and his men arrive and rescue all the officers. After the shootout, André is photographed by the press. André and Neto apply for BOPE, motivated by their honesty and devotion, and eagerness for action. At the NGO office, Baiano confronts Maria and her friends with a newspaper featuring André's picture and threatens to kill them if they bring policemen inside his territory.

The BOPE training proves to be gruesome, both as a way to weed out weak candidates, and also to terrorize and force out known corrupt police officers. Many candidates quit – including Fábio (who applied as a way to avoid Oliveira) – but both Neto and André successfully pass; Neto celebrates by getting a BOPE tattoo on his arm. André's relationship with Maria ends and he confronts Edu, ordering him to arrange a meet with Romerito the next day to give him a pair of glasses. Edu reveals André's plan to Baiano, who sets an ambush to kill him. Neto informs André of a job interview at a law firm that will conflict with meeting Romerito, and volunteers to deliver the glasses in his place: this results in Neto being mortally wounded. When Baiano prepares to finish him, he notices his BOPE tattoo and goes into hiding for fear of retaliation, but not before abducting and executing Roberta and Rodriguez as his payback for allowing a BOPE officer into the slum.

After Neto's funeral, André, Nascimento and other BOPE officers make daily incursions into Baiano's slum, torturing several dealers into revealing his whereabouts; when one of them reveals Edu tipped Baiano, an enraged André storms into a peace walk, beats Edu, and insults Maria and the others. BOPE interrogates several of the locals before finally locating and cornering Baiano; due to Baiano's pleas to not hurt his face for the wake, Nascimento orders André to summarily execute him with a shotgun shot to the face, both as revenge for Neto's death and as a final rite of passage for BOPE. André cocks the gun and the screen fades to white as the shot is heard.

== Cast ==
- Wagner Moura as Roberto Nascimento – A captain in the BOPE squad, who is awaiting a promotion that will make his job safer and enable him to spend time with his wife and newborn son. In order to move into his new position he needs to find a worthy successor.
- Caio Junqueira as Aspirant Neto Gouveia – He is a rookie police officer and André's best friend. Nascimento describes Neto as being similar to himself when he was younger. He is a tough man, but has a fierce temper as well, and never gives up on his mission. He later joined BOPE to seek out justice and was groomed for Nascimento's spot.
- André Ramiro as Aspirant André Matias – Another rookie police officer, he is also a law student, who wants to specialize in criminal law. He is a resourceful and calculating tactician. He joins BOPE along with Neto Gouveia.
- Maria Ribeiro as Rosane Nascimento – Nascimento's wife. They are expecting their first child. She dislikes Nascimento's frequent absence from home and the dangers associated with his job.
- Milhem Cortaz as Capitão Fábio Barbosa – One of the captains where André and Neto work he develops a sort-of friendship with the two. A former pimp in Copacabana he also runs a protection racket scheme. After André and Neto stole the drug payoff he feared that Oliveira would blame him and have him killed.
- Fernanda Machado as Maria – A law student and founding member of the NGO, she is also a marijuana user. She befriends André and falls in love with him, but when Baiano finds out that he is a cop, she abandons him for lying to her and because she fears Baiano's retribution. She later helps André by giving him the name of Baiano's girlfriend. In the end, André insults her and her friends and walks away, ending their relationship.
- André Di Mauro as Pedro Rodrigues – A student who works in the favela's NGO and dates Roberta. As a punishment for bringing a cop into the drug dealer's circle of friends, Rodrigues is necklaced.
- Paulo Vilela as Edu – Nicknamed "Playboy", he is the main university drug dealer and is close to Baiano, although he is afraid of him. He despises André for his defense of police officers.
- Fábio Lago as Baiano – He is a ruthless drug lord who sells marijuana and heroin throughout the university using several students. Unlike many other drug lords, he hates all cops, even the corrupt ones, and avoids having business with them. Edu is his main seller on the university. He has a small auxiliary that protects the NGO.
- Marcelo Valle as Capitão Oliveira – He is Fabio's rival and superior in the police force, taking over his territory for protection rackets and later allegedly setting him up to be killed.
- Fernanda de Freitas as Roberta Alunde
- Alex Avellar, as 02
- Ricardo Pagotto Piai, as 08
- Guilherme Aguilar, as 07
- Pedro Bonfim, as PM Robson

== Inspiration ==
The movie is based on Elite da Tropa, a book by two Battalion of Special Police Operations (BOPE) officers, André Batista and Rodrigo Pimentel, together with sociologist & anthropologist Luiz Eduardo Soares, which provided a semi-fictional account of the daily routine of the BOPE as well as some historical events, based on the experiences of the two BOPE policemen. The book was controversial at the time of release, in its description of the BOPE as a "killing machine", as well as the detailed allegation of an aborted assassination attempt on then left-wing governor of Rio de Janeiro, Leonel Brizola, and reportedly resulted in Batista being reprimanded and censured by the Military Police. The writing contained some discrepancies, however Soares did not retract his novel. The novel had a unique reception when it was translated in 2010. There were many fans of the original novel and film who felt that the Portuguese-English translation was poor and did not follow the film and vice versa. Ultimately the novel (before translation) was more like the film than the novel in English.

== Production leak ==
In August 2007, prior to the movie's release to theaters, a preliminary cut of the film was leaked and made available for download on the Internet. The cut, which included English title cards but no subtitles, was leaked from the company responsible for subtitling the film, resulting in one person being fired and a criminal investigation. It was estimated that about 11.5 million people had seen the leaked version of the movie in 2007.

== Reception ==
=== Popularity and box office ===
Tropa de Elite became one of the most popular Brazilian movies in history. According to Datafolha, 77% of São Paulo residents knew about the movie. The word of mouth was also important for the disclosure of the film, with 80% of the people rating the movie as "excellent" or "good", according to the same poll. The movie was released in Rio de Janeiro and São Paulo on October 5, 2007 (with the intention of being considered by the Ministry of Culture to compete as the Brazilian entry for the Best Foreign Language Film Oscar). It was released nationwide on October 12, 2007. By January 2008, 2.5 million people had seen it in theaters. In Rio and São Paulo, with no promotion other than billboards, 180,000 people saw the movie during its opening weekend.

The movie was also the cover issue for the two Brazil's most important weekly magazines, Veja and Época. In the beginning of 2008 it was confirmed that Rede Globo would produce a TV series based on the movie. In 2011 Rockstar Games recommended Elite Squad to fans of its video game Max Payne 3, which is set in Brazil and depicts battles between special police units and favela gangs.

=== Critical response ===
Outside Brazil reviews of the film were initially mixed, but after time the film was received more positively. Elite Squad has an approval rating of 51% on review aggregator website Rotten Tomatoes, based on 35 reviews, and an average rating of 5.2/10. The website's critical consensus states: "Brutal, action-heavy Brazilian cop film with a pointless voiceover. Lacks flair, overdoes the violence and is never quite sure where its morals lie". Metacritic assigned the film a weighted average score of 33 out of 100, based on 6 critics, indicating "generally unfavorable reviews". The film won the Golden Bear at the 2008 Berlin Film Festival.

=== Criticism ===
When the first version of the film leaked, it caused a major controversy for its portrayal of Captain Nascimento's unpunished police brutality in slums (favelas); some saw it as glamourizing police violence. After its exhibition in Berlin Film Festival, critic Jay Weissberg, in a Variety article, called the movie "a one-note celebration of violence-for-good that plays like a recruitment film for fascist thugs". Michel Misse, a researcher of urban violence in the Federal University of Rio de Janeiro, in an article by Carta Capital, tried to explain why some people cheered at Captain Nascimento's actions: "as the judiciary system cannot keep up with the demand for punishment, some may think civil rights leads to unpunishment. And then, they want illegal solutions. That's why Captain Nascimento is called".

=== Awards ===
==== Brazilian Awards ====
Elite Squad would become one of Brazil's most awarded movies, both at home and abroad. In the 2008 Vivo Brazilian Academy Film Awards Elite Squad won nine awards: Best Director, Best Actor, Best Photography, Best Special Effects, Best Make-up, Best Fiction Editing, and Best Sound.

The movie would also sweep the Guarani Brazilian Film Awards [pt], winning nine awards for Best Movie, Best Director, Best Actor, Best Supporting Actor, Best Soundtrack, Best Sound, Best Editing, Best Special Effects and Best Movie according to the public. It would tie with City of God as the movie with the most Guarani Awards.

On August 19, 2008, Elite Squad won four awards at the Contigo! Cinema Awards, winning Best Movie, Best Screenplay, Best Director and Best Secondary Character. Director André Padilha did not attend, so the prize was received by André Ramiro.

At the ACIE Prize of Cinema, it won Best Movie, Best Director, Best Actor, Best Photography and Popular Jury. At the SESC Festival of Best Movies, Elite Squad won both by critics and public for Best Actor, while winning the public vote for Best Movie and Best Director but losing in the critic vote to Playing. It also won Best Movie Sound at the 2008 ABC Prize.

At the 2007 Arte Qualidade Brasil Award [pt], Tropa de Elite won Best Film, Best Director, Best Actor, Best Supporting Actor, Best Supporting Actress and Best Promising Actor.

On March 25, 2008, Director José Padilha and Editor Daniel Rezende won the APCA Award for Best Film for best Director and Editor.

==== Foreign Awards ====
On February 16, 2008, Elite Squad won the Best Movie award at the 58th Berlin International Film Festival, the Golden Bear.

On August 8, 2008, it won the popular jury for Best Movie at the Lima Film Festival. On August 11, 2009, it won the Best Ibero-American Movie award at the 2009 Silver Condor Awards.

== Soundtrack ==
The soundtrack of the film was a collection of popular hits, with "Lado B Lado A" by O Rappa being used as the film's ending theme, but even the soundtrack would not escape controversy as the Brazilian authorities demanded the removal of MC Leonardo's "Rap das Armas" from the film, because of alleged promotion of violence like use of illegal arms and drugs. The filmmakers complied two weeks after the official release.

1. "Rap das Armas" - Bateria da Rocinha, MC Junior & MC Leonardo
2. "Tropa de Elite" - Tihuana
3. "Rap da Felicidade" - MC Cidinho, MC Doca
4. "Passa Que é Teu" - Pedro Bromfman
5. "Brilhar a Minha Estrela" - Sangue da Cidade
6. "Kátia Flávia, a Godiva do Irajá" - Fausto Fawcett
7. "Teatro de Bonecos" - Guilherme Flarys, Pedro Guedes
8. "Polícia" - Titãs
9. "Invasão do BOPE" - Pedro Bromfman
10. "Lado B Lado A" - O Rappa
11. "Andando Pela África" - Barbatuques
12. "Nossa Bandeira" - Bateria da Rocinha, MC Leonardo
13. "Rap das Armas (Samba School)" - MC Leonardo, MC Junior, Bateria da Rocinha

== Sequel ==
A sequel, named Tropa de Elite 2: O Inimigo Agora É Outro, was released in Brazil on October 8, 2010, and in the U.S. on November 11, 2011.

== See also ==
- Bus 174
- City of God
- Rota 66: A Polícia que Mata
