= Elite Squad: The Enemy Within =

2010 Brazilian crime film directed by José Padilha

- Theatrical release poster
- Directed by: José Padilha
- Written by: José Padilha; Bráulio Mantovani; Rodrigo Pimentel
- Produced by: José Padilha; Marcos Prado
- Starring: Wagner Moura; Irandhir Santos; André Ramiro; Milhem Cortaz; André Mattos; Maria Ribeiro
- Cinematography: Lula Carvalho
- Edited by: Daniel Rezende
- Music by: Pedro Bromfman
- Production companies: Zazen Produções; Globo Filmes; Feijão Filmes; RioFilme
- Distributed by: Zazen Produções
- Release date: October 8, 2010
- Running time: 115 minutes
- Country: Brazil
- Language: Portuguese
- Budget: R$ 16 million (US$ 9,509,650)
- Box office: $63,027,681

Elite Squad: The Enemy Within (Tropa de Elite 2: O Inimigo Agora é Outro; also known as Elite Squad 2) is a 2010 Brazilian action thriller film directed and co-produced by José Padilha, who co-wrote it with Bráulio Mantovani and Rodrigo Pimentel. The sequel to 2007's Elite Squad, it furthers the plot of a semi-fictional account of BOPE, the special operations force of the Rio de Janeiro Military Police, with a focus on the relationship between law enforcement and politics. The film was released in Brazil on October 8, 2010.

Like its predecessor, the film was met with critical acclaim and became the largest box office ticket seller and highest-grossing film of all time in Brazil, ahead of Dona Flor and Her Two Husbands and Avatar, respectively. It was selected as the Brazilian entry for the Best Foreign Language Film at the 84th Academy Awards, but did not make the final shortlist.

== Plot ==
Thirteen years after the events of the first film, BOPE Lieutenant Colonel (formerly Captain) Nascimento is ambushed while leaving a hospital. While his car is sprayed with bullets, his voiceover narrates the events leading to that point.

Four years prior, Nascimento arrives at Bangu Penitentiary Complex to quell a riot started by gangleader Beirada. Diogo Fraga, a teacher and human rights activist married to Nascimento's ex-wife Rosane, is summoned and escorted to the place to negotiate a peaceful surrender, and eventually convinces Beirada to release the hostages, but Captain André Matias, commander-in-field and Nascimento's protégé, shoots Beirada against Nascimento's orders, ruining the entire operation and leading to multiple inmate deaths.

Upon learning PMERJ commander Formoso plans to dismiss him due to the bad publicity, Nascimento enters a restaurant to confront him, only to be cheered by other diners for his tough line. Rio de Janeiro's State Secretary for Public Safety Guaracy, who's dinnering with Formoso, seizes the opportunity and promotes Nascimento to the position of "Subsecretary", while demotes Matias back to the PMERJ as a scapegoat; enraged, Matias speaks to journalist Clara Vidal about corruption in the government and lack of support to BOPE, leading to a month of jail. Nascimento visits and promises to help him using his position, but André dismisses his offers, telling him "the only person who'll change with him in the government is himself". Meanwhile, Fraga is elected to Rio's State Assembly.

Through his new commanding position, Nascimento expands BOPE's arsenal and personnel, granting it armored vehicles and a helicopter and enabling the battalion to fully eliminate entire drug cartels from favelas, thus drastically reducing police corruption. However, the absence of ancontrolling parallel power in these areas leads corrupt PMERJ Major Rocha and his men to form a police militia, whicy quickly takes over the community by extorting the residents and eventually building a political machine, with support from the State Governor, Guaracy and Fortunato, a former television host elected Representative for Rio.

In the present day, Rocha's militia has taken nearly all of Western Rio. Disguised militiamen steal rifles from a police station in Tanque, one of the last drug dealing strongholds, providing a pretext to authorize a police operation to expel the drug dealers (vonsequently clearing the way for the militia to take over). Nascimento listens to phonetaps of drug dealers and assures Guaracy they are uninvolved; however, corrupt Lieutenant-Colonel Fabio Barbosa claims an informant has implicated them and the raid is authorized. Matias, returned to BOPE by Rocha, occupies the station and ambushes the fleeing dealers, torturing captured drugleader Pepa to learn where the stolen weapons are. As Rocha arrives and inexplicably shoots Pepa, Matias confronts him, but is shot and killed by Rocha's men.

Devastated by Matias' death and aware Fraga has been investigating the militia, Nascimento taps his phone. Clara and her photographer sneak into one of Rocha's favelas and find the Governor's re-election campaign material; she calls Fraga, but both are caught and killed by Rocha's men. Nascimento overhears the call, realizes Fraga is now a target, takes the recording and goes after him; as he waits outside Fraga's building, Fraga, Rafael and Rosane's car is attacked in a drive-by shootingupon arriving. Nascimento shoots the assailant, but Rafael is wounded. They take him to the hospital and Nascimento hands the recording to Fraga, whereupon he detains and assaults Guaracy, threatening to kill everyone involved if his son dies.

The Assembly opens an investigation into the journalists' disappearances based on the recording delivered by Fraga. However, Nascimento is accused of tapping Fraga's phone to spy on Rosane, forcing his resignation. Believing the militia will be scapegoats, Rocha and his men ambush him after a visit to Rafael; however, Nascimento expected to become a target and has his fellow BOPE officers aiding him. They shoot some of the assailants, but Rocha escapes.

Nascimento is called to testify and implicates the Governor, Guaracy, Fortunato and many other individuals, as many of them are murdered to prevent them from testifying. The Governor, however, is re-elected and Guaracy is elected a Federal Representative for Rio. The final scene shows Nascimento reflecting over the political scenario in Brazil and stating that "as long as the conditions for the system remain, it will remain". He visits Rafael as he slowly wakes from his coma.

== Cast ==
- Wagner Moura as Roberto Nascimento, lieutenant colonel of the PMERJ and State Subsecretary for Public Safety.
- Irandhir Santos as Diogo Fraga, a history teacher who becomes a state representative after the Bangu I controversy. Rosane's new husband, he is a left-wing politician who runs for state representative in the Federal Chamber of Deputies. Fraga's role was inspired by real life politician Marcelo Freixo.
- André Ramiro as Captain André Matias, a BOPE officer.
- Maria Ribeiro as Rosane Fraga, ex-wife of Nascimento current wife of Fraga.
- Pedro Van-Hel as Rafael "Rafa" Nascimento, the teenage son of Nascimento and Rosane.
- Sandro Rocha (article on Portuguese Wikipedia) as Captain/Major Rocha, one of the main antagonists of the film. Rocha had a small role in the first film, being one of the sargeants under Fabio's control.
- Milhem Cortaz portrays Lieutenant Colonel/Colonel Fabio Barbosa.
- Tainá Müller plays Clara, a journalist. In the film, Matias reads her interview on the scrapping of the BOPE, after being expelled from the same battalion because of the events in the rebellion in Bangu I and then assists the Deputy Diogo Fraga in investigating of the militias.
- André Mattos as Gregorio Fortunato, state representative and host of a tabloid TV show.
- Seu Jorge as Beirada, a convict responsible for the Bangu I uprising.

== Production ==
=== Casting and characters ===
The first member to be acknowledged was Wagner Moura, who returns with his character Roberto Nascimento, now promoted from captain to lieutenant colonel. In Elite Squad: The Enemy Within, Nascimento is 40 years old and has a slightly grayer hair. André Ramiro is also back as Captain André Matias (promoted from Officer Cadet); the actor was prepped by professionals from the CATI-SWAT to give orders to the cops on-screen. Musician and actor Seu Jorge (who played Mané Galinha in City of God) was invited by director José Padilha to act as one of the antagonists, Beirada; Maria Ribeiro is also back as Roseane, who is no longer married to Nascimento, but to a left wing Congressman. Tainá Müller, who was not in the first film, plays Clara, representing the media. Sandro Rocha, who had little on-screen time during the first film, has a bigger role now, playing Major Rocha, known as Russo (Russian), boss of the militia.

=== Cast preparation ===
Between November and December 2009, before recording for the film started, every actor - except Maria Ribeiro, pregnant at the time - had a training routine, led by Fátima Toledo. Part of the cast also went through a boot camp in Rio, coordinated by Paulo Storani, security adviser, and with the participation of members from BOPE and CATI. André Ramiro said, "They treated us like real cops. No 'I'm-too-important'. I also had to say 'No, sir. Yes, sir'". Wagner Moura had Jiu-Jitsu lessons from fighter Rickson Gracie. The training helped bring a degree of reality to the film; actors had to learn the proper techniques to handle weapons and also action strategies in risk-zones, besides a strong fitness program, laid heavy on those who weren't in the first movie.

=== Filming and post-production ===
Filming started on January 25 of 2010, with the participation of eighty real cops as extras. On February 1, recording took place at Morro Dona Marta, in the Botafogo borough, with the use of two helicopters and heavy guns, leading to next-door neighbors thinking it was a real shoot-out. For the scenes happening at the Bangu 1 prison, forty professionals worked during two months constructing a 500m² detention center, based on notations from art director Tiago Marques about the place, since they didn't get clearance to take pictures of the real building. The scenes at the prison were recorded during the four days of the 2010 carnival. One of the film scenes would be shot at the House of Congress in Brasília, but production couldn't get permission. A fake Ethics Committee was built inside the Federation of Industries of Rio de Janeiro, recording took place at April 15. Filming was done in the same month and the film went to post-production.

== Release ==
=== Strategy against leaks ===
After the first film leaked and got in the hands of millions of people before the official release date, the Elite Squad 2 crew created a strategy to avoid the same thing happening to the prequel. Before production began, Marcos Prado informed that, "This time we will have a special security scheme. We will have a security team watching over the editing, transporting the reels, and paying close attention to every little detail. The raw material will be preserved". Director José Padilha concluded, "We won't outsource any of the steps. We are doing the whole post-production at our company, inside our 'caveirão'". The script was sent to the National Agency of Cinema under the title "Organized crime" and was printed with red ink, to avoid photocopying. The production unit rented an apartment, monitored by cameras, where editing took place. Four people had access to the place, only through passwords, and no means of accessing the Internet. Another strategy used was the marking of each copy sent to the theaters; that way if any of the copies was illegally recorded, they would know where it came from. Military policemen from São Paulo also helped in avoiding the leak. The final picture, still with no sound, was put in a safe.

=== Domestic release ===
Elite Squad: The Enemy Within broke national opening weekend records in Brazil, with more than 1.25 million spectators during its first weekend. This opening was the fifth biggest in Brazilian history and the biggest one for a Brazilian film, so far. A total of 696 theaters screened the film, some as often as eight times per day. In three weeks, the film surpassed the mark of R$ 60 million in gross revenue and over six million viewers becoming the most successful Brazilian film of the 21st century so far on local theaters. In just nine weeks, the film surpassed ten million viewers on theaters throughout the country, becoming the highest box office of a local film in Brazilian history.

=== United Kingdom release ===
Elite Squad: The Enemy Within was released in the UK by Revolver Entertainment on August 12, 2011.

=== United States release ===
The film held its United States premiere in January 2011 at the Sundance Film Festival. Since, it has screened at several festivals, including Austin's Fantastic Fest. The film was released in New York City on November 11, 2011, and in Los Angeles on November 18, 2011.

== Reception ==
The review aggregator website Rotten Tomatoes gives the film a 91% approval rating based on reviews from 46 critics, and a weighted average of seven out of ten. The website's critical consensus states: "Elite Squad: The Enemy Within is a bleak, violent descent into the Brazilian underbelly, ripping into the favelas with unstoppable and kinetic force." At Metacritic, the film received an average score of 71% based on 18 reviews, indicating "generally favorable reviews".

== Possible sequel ==
At a press conference after the exhibition of Elite Squad: The Enemy Within at the Berlin Festival José Padilha was asked about the possible follow-up. He ruled out the possibility of making an Elite Squad 3. "I told you everything I wanted to say about violence," the director said. Wagner Moura raised the possibility that the third film would be made without the character he played. "Captain Nascimento has nowhere to go from the point of view of dramaturgy, for the big money that it can produce," he said in an interview with GQ in September of 2016.

== See also ==
- List of submissions to the 84th Academy Awards for Best Foreign Language Film
- List of Brazilian submissions for the Academy Award for Best Foreign Language Film
