= Prêmio ACIE de Cinema =

ACIE Awards
- Awarded for: Excellence in cinematic achievements
- Country: Brazil
- First award: 2004
- Website: www.premioaciedecinema.com.br/index.htm

Prêmio ACIE de Cinema was a Brazilian film awards program, created in 2004. It was last awarded in 2013. Inspired by the Golden Globe Awards, the awards were the brainchild of Michael Astor, a correspondent for the Associated Press who was then president of the Foreign Press Correspondents Association (ACIE).

Brazilian feature films released in theaters during the previous year were evaluated by an awards committee made up of ACIE members, during a special screening. The categories included: Film (fiction), Director, Actress, Actor, Documentary, Cinematography, Screenplay, and Soundtrack. A ninth category called "Blockbuster Brazil" was added in 2012 for films that sold over one million tickets at the box office. From 2007, the awards also featured a special tribute to a person in their film industry for their body of work.

== Special Tribute Award ==
The following individuals have received the Special Tribute Award for lifetime achievement:

Year	Recipient	Ref.
2007	Eduardo Coutinho	
2008	Paulo José	
2009	Domingos Oliveira	
2010	Carlos Manga	
2011	Carlos Diegues	
2012	Fernando Meirelles	
2013	Fernanda Montenegro	
