= José Padilha =

Brazilian film director (born 1967)

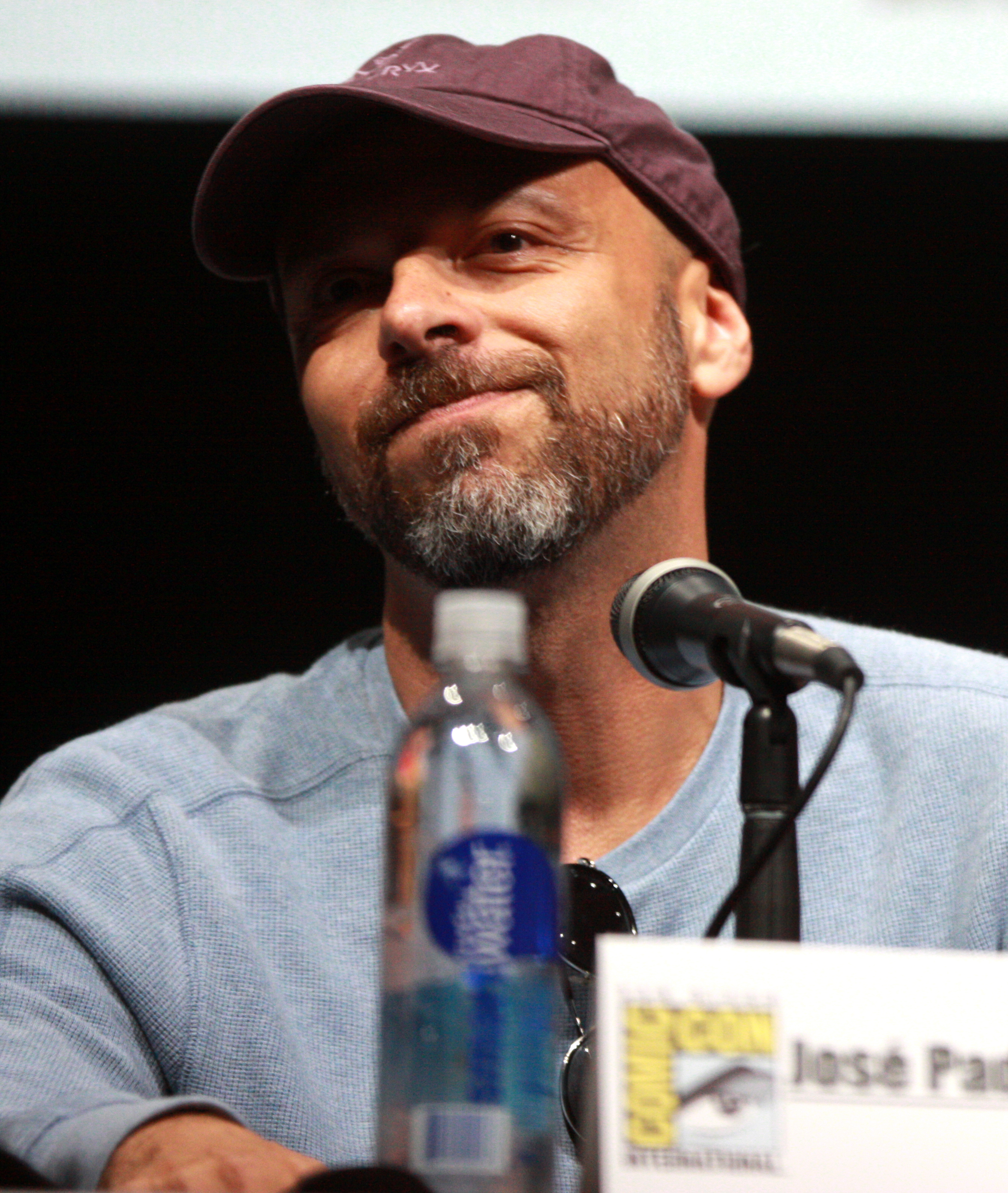
- Padilha at San Diego Comic-Con in 2013
- Born: José Bastos Padilha Neto; 1 August 1967 (age 59); Rio de Janeiro, Brazil
- Education: Oxford University
- Occupations: Film director, producer and screenwriter
- Years active: 2000–present
- Known for: Elite Squad; Elite Squad: The Enemy Within; RoboCop

José Bastos Padilha Neto (Brazilian Portuguese: [ʒuˈzɛ paˈdʒiʎɐ]; born 1 August 1967) is a Brazilian film director, producer and screenwriter. He is best known for directing the Brazilian critical and financial successes Elite Squad and Elite Squad: The Enemy Within and the 2014 remake of RoboCop. He has won the Golden Bear at the Berlin International Film Festival for Elite Squad in 2008. He is also the producer of the Netflix original series Narcos, starring frequent collaborator Wagner Moura, and directed the first two episodes in the series.

== Early life ==
Padilha was born in Rio de Janeiro on 1 August 1967. Before making films, he studied business, politics, and economics in Rio de Janeiro. He attended Oxford University and studied literature and international politics.

In 1997, Padilha co-founded the production company Zazen Produções with Marcos Prado, whom he met at Oxford. In the years to come, Zazen Produções would become hugely instrumental in his film making affairs.

== Career ==
Padilha emerged onto the Brazilian movie scene with his first feature film Bus 174 (2002). The film was a documentary feature produced by his production company; it detailed the story of a bus hijacking in his hometown. Employing his interest in politics, Padilha used the film to show how social engineered poverty in Rio de Janeiro had an effect on crime. The movie was a success, earning $217,201 at the box office, but caused controversy for some who believed that Padilha was sympathizing with a criminal, and portraying the police as incompetent and corrupt. The film received a lot of attention in several film festivals, including Vancouver, Sundance, and San Francisco.

In 2007, Padilha directed Elite Squad, his first semi-fictional film. The film was a commercial and critical success, seen by more than 11 million people in Brazil, coming in at number 1 in 2007. In 2008, Padilha won the Golden Bear at the Berlin Film Festival for Elite Squad, bringing him international attention. The budget was just over 6 million dollars and included funding from the Weinstein Company, and several others. This film sparked discussions regarding police brutality in Brazil, as well as their alleged involvement with gang related activities. Due to the success of Elite Squad, a 2010 sequel was released: Elite Squad: The Enemy Within. It still holds the record highest domestic grossing film and all-time largest box office ticket sales in Brazil. This film was selected as Brazil's official Academy Awards' entry in 2012 for Best Foreign Film, but it did not make the final shortlist. The films form part of a planned trilogy, examining the influence of media, police and politicians on society.

After Elite Squad, Padilha made two more documentary films. The first documentary was Garapa, which follows a family of three fighting to stave off hunger in Brazil. The documentary film Secrets of the Tribe premièred at the 2010 Sundance Film Festival to critical acclaim. This film explores certain allegations first brought to light in Patrick Tierney's book Darkness in El Dorado (2000), that anthropologists studying the Yanomami Indians in the 1960s and 1970s engaged in bizarre and inappropriate interactions with the tribe, including sexual and medical violations.

After the huge success of both Elite Squad films, Padilha was offered several films by Sony Pictures Entertainment. He declined them all before deciding to film a reboot of the 1987 sci-fi classic, RoboCop. Padilha said, "I went to into Sony and they were offering me a lot of movies, but none of them were Robocop. I didn't want to make any of those movies they were talking about. And there was a Robocop poster in the room. Eventually I said to them, do you own Robocop? And they go like, 'Yeah'…and I said, you know, I want to do it…" On March 2, 2011, it was announced that Padilha would direct the rebooted RoboCop film. The film was released on February 12, 2014. Padilha continued with his political narrative by using the film to illustrate the dangers and moral hazards of automated violence.The film grossed over $240 million worldwide and was met with a mixed reception by critics.

== Filmography ==
=== Film ===
Year	Title	Language	Awards
2002	Bus 174	Portuguese	
2007	Elite Squad	Portuguese	Golden Bear
2009	Garapa	Portuguese	
2010	Elite Squad: The Enemy Within	Portuguese	
2010	Secrets of the Tribe	Yanomaman/Spanish/Italian/English	
2014	RoboCop	English	
2014	Rio, I Love You	English	
2018	Entebbe	English	
2024	American Cancer Story	English	

=== Television ===
Year	Title	Language	Notes	Role
2015	Narcos	English/Spanish	Netflix series	Director (2 episodes), executive producer
2018	O Mecanismo	Portuguese	Netflix series	Director (8 episodes), executive producer
2018	Narcos: Mexico	English/Spanish	Netflix series	Executive producer

=== Music video ===
Year	Title	Artist	Language	Notes
2018	"Let Me"	Zayn	English	

== Bibliography ==
Tauris, I.B. ‘Revisiting the "realism" of the cosmetics of hunger: Cidade de Deus and Ônibus 174’.
