= List of French films of 2002 =

A list of films produced in France in 2002.

Title	Director	Cast	Genre	Notes
8 Women	François Ozon		Comedy mystery	5 wins & 19 nominations
Adolphe	Benoît Jacquot	Isabelle Adjani	Drama	1 win
The Adversary	Nicole Garcia			Entered into the 2002 Cannes Film Festival
Aram	Robert Kechichian	Simon Abkarian	Drama	1 win, 1 nomination
Asterix & Obelix: Mission Cleopatra	Alain Chabat	Gérard Depardieu, Christian Clavier	Adventure comedy	1 win & 4 nominations
L'Auberge espagnole	Cédric Klapisch	Romain Duris, Judith Godrèche, Audrey Tautou	Drama	
Balzac and the Little Chinese Seamstress	Dai Sijie	Zhou Xun, Liu Ye	Period drama	
Carnage	Delphine Gleize	Chiara Mastroianni	Drama	Screened at the 2002 Cannes Film Festival
La cité de Dieu	Fernando Meirelles, Kátia Lund (co-director)	Alexandre Rodrigues, Leandro Firmino Da Hora, Jonathan Haagensen, Phellipe Haagensen, Douglas Silva, Daniel Zettel, Seu Jorge	Epic crime	Brazilian-French-German co-production
Demonlover	Olivier Assayas	Connie Nielsen	Thriller drama	Nominated for Palme d'Or at Cannes, +3 wins, +2 nom.
Décalage Horaire	Danièle Thompson	Juliette Binoche, Jean Reno	Romantic comedy	Nominated for César Awards
Les Diables	Christophe Ruggia	Adèle Haenel, Vincent Rottiers	Drama	
Femme Fatale	Brian De Palma	Rebecca Romijn, Antonio Banderas	Crime thriller	
Filles perdues, cheveux gras	Claude Duty	Amira Casar, Marina Foïs, Olivia Bonamy, Charles Berling	Musical comedy-drama	Screened at the 2002 Cannes Film Festival, Best French Script at the 2002 Deauville Film Festival
Glowing Eyes	Jacques Nolot	Jacques Nolot	Drama	Screened at the 2002 Cannes Film Festival
He Loves Me... He Loves Me Not	Laetitia Colombani	Audrey Tautou	Romance thriller	1 nomination
L'homme du train	Patrice Leconte	Jean Rochefort, Johnny Hallyday	Crime drama	Nominated for Golden Lion, +6 wins, +2 nom.
Irréversible	Gaspar Noé	Monica Bellucci, Vincent Cassel	Crime drama	Nominated for Palme d'Or, +2 wins, +4 nom.
A Loving Father	Jacob Berger	Gérard Depardieu, Guillaume Depardieu	Drama	
Marie-Jo and Her Two Lovers	Robert Guédiguian	Ariane Ascaride		Entered into the 2002 Cannes Film Festival
A Piece of Sky	Bénédicte Liénard	Séverine Caneele		Screened at the 2002 Cannes Film Festival
Rue des plaisirs	Patrice Leconte	Vincent Elbaz, Laetitia Casta	Romance	
Secret Things	Jean-Claude Brisseau	Coralie Revel, Sabrina Seyvecou	Drama	
Seventeen Times Cecile Cassard	Christophe Honoré	Béatrice Dalle		Screened at the 2002 Cannes Film Festival
Summer Things	Michel Blanc	Charlotte Rampling, Jacques Dutronc, Carole Bouquet, Karin Viard	Comedy, Drama, Romance	1 win & 3 nominations at the César Awards
The Son	Dardenne brothers	Olivier Gourmet	Drama	8 wins & 7 nominations
The Soul Keeper	Roberto Faenza	Emilia Fox, Iain Glen, Craig Ferguson	romance-drama	Italian-French-British co-production
The Spanish Apartment	Cédric Klapisch	Romain Duris, Judith Godrèche	Romantic comedy	7 wins & 8 nominations
Speak to Me of Love	Sophie Marceau	Judith Godrèche	Drama	1 win & 1 nomination
