= Washington D.C. Area Film Critics Association Award for Best Adapted Screenplay =

Annual US film award

The Washington D.C. Area Film Critics Association Award for Best Adapted Screenplay is one of the annual awards given by the Washington D.C. Area Film Critics Association.

== Winners and nominees ==
=== 2000s ===
Year	Writer(s)	Film	Source	Ref.
2002	Charlie Kaufman	Adaptation.	The Orchid Thief by Susan Orlean	
2002	Peter Hedges, Chris Weitz, and Paul Weitz	About a Boy	About a Boy by Nick Hornby	
2003	Brian Helgeland	Mystic River	novel by Dennis Lehane	
2003	Bráulio Mantovani	City of God (Cidade de Deus)	novel by Paulo Lins	
2003	Peter Jackson, Frances Walsh, and Philippa Boyens	The Lord of the Rings: The Return of the King	novel by J. R. R. Tolkien	
2003	Billy Ray	Shattered Glass	article by H. G. Bissinger	
2003	Peter Weir and John Collee	Master and Commander: The Far Side of the World	novels by Patrick O'Brian	
2004	Alexander Payne and Jim Taylor	Sideways	novel by Rex Pickett	
2005	Dan Futterman	Capote	In Cold Blood by Truman Capote	
2005	Larry McMurtry and Diana Ossana	Brokeback Mountain	short story by Annie Proulx	
2005	Arthur Golden, Robin Swicord, and Doug Wright	Memoirs of a Geisha	novel by Arthur Golden	
2005	Tony Kushner and Eric Roth	Munich	book by George Jonas	
2005	Deborah Moggach	Pride and Prejudice	novel by Jane Austen	
2006	Jason Reitman	Thank You for Smoking	novel by Christopher Buckley	
2007	Aaron Sorkin	Charlie Wilson's War	novel by George Crile III	
2008	Simon Beaufoy	Slumdog Millionaire	Q & A by Vikas Swarup	
2009	Sheldon Turner and Jason Reitman	Up in the Air	novel by Walter Kirn	
2009	Nick Hornby	An Education	memoir by Lynn Barber	
2009	Geoffrey Fletcher	Precious	novel by Sapphire	
2009	John Lee Hancock	The Blind Side	book by Michael Lewis	
2009	Joe Penhall	The Road	novel by Cormac McCarthy	

=== 2010s ===
Year	Writer(s)	Film	Source	Ref.
2010	Aaron Sorkin	The Social Network	The Accidental Billionaires by Ben Mezrich	
2010	Danny Boyle and Simon Beaufoy	127 Hours	Between a Rock and a Hard Place by Aron Ralston	
2010	Michael Arndt	Toy Story 3	characters by John Lasseter	
2010	Joel Coen and Ethan Coen	True Grit	novel by Charles Portis	
2010	Debra Granik and Anne Rosselini	Winter's Bone	novel by Daniel Woodrell	
2011	Alexander Payne, Nat Faxon, and Jim Rash	The Descendants	novel by Kaui Hart Hemmings	
2011	Tate Taylor	The Help	novel by Kathryn Stockett	
2011	John Logan	Hugo	The Invention of Hugo Cabret by Brian Selznick	
2011	Steven Zaillian and Aaron Sorkin	Moneyball	novel by Charles Portis	
2011	Bridget O'Connor and Peter Straughan	Tinker Tailor Soldier Spy	novel by John le Carré	
2012	David O. Russell	Silver Linings Playbook	The Silver Linings Playbook by Matthew Quick	
2012	Chris Terrio	Argo	The Master of Disguise by Tony Mendez	
2012	David Magee	Life of Pi	novel by Yann Martel	
2012	Tony Kushner	Lincoln	Team of Rivals: The Political Genius of Abraham Lincoln by Doris Kearns Goodwin	
2012	Stephen Chbosky	The Perks of Being a Wallflower	novel by Stephen Chbosky	
2013	John Ridley	12 Years a Slave	memoir by Solomon Northup	
2013	Richard Linklater, Ethan Hawke, and Julie Delpy	Before Midnight	characters by Richard Linklater and Kim Krizan	
2013	Billy Ray	Captain Phillips	A Captain's Duty: Somali Pirates, Navy SEALs, and Dangerous Days at Sea by Richard Phillips	
2013	Scott Neustadter and Michael H. Weber	The Spectacular Now	novel by Tim Tharp	
2013	Terence Winter	The Wolf of Wall Street	memoir by Jordan Belfort	
2014	Gillian Flynn	Gone Girl	novel by Gillian Flynn	
2014	Graham Moore	The Imitation Game	Alan Turing: The Enigma by Andrew Hodges	
2014	Paul Thomas Anderson	Inherent Vice	novel by Thomas Pynchon	
2014	Anthony McCarten	The Theory of Everything	Travelling to Infinity: My Life with Stephen by Jane Hawking	
2014	Nick Hornby	Wild	memoir by Cheryl Strayed	
2015	Emma Donoghue	Room	novel by Emma Donoghue	
2015	Nick Hornby	Brooklyn	novel by Colm Tóibín	
2015	Phyllis Nagy	Carol	The Price of Salt by Patricia Highsmith	
2015	Drew Goddard	The Martian	novel by Andy Weir	
2015	Aaron Sorkin	Steve Jobs	biography by Walter Isaacson	
2016	Eric Heisserer	Arrival	"Story of Your Life" by Ted Chiang	
2016	August Wilson	Fences	play by August Wilson	
2016	Luke Davies	Lion	A Long Way Home by Saroo Brierley	
2016	Patrick Ness	A Monster Calls	novel by Patrick Ness	
2016	Tom Ford	Nocturnal Animals	Tony and Susan by Austin Wright	
2017	Virgil Williams and Dee Rees	Mudbound	novel by Hillary Jordan	
2017	Hampton Fancher and Michael Green	Blade Runner 2049	characters from Do Androids Dream of Electric Sheep? by Philip K. Dick	
2017	James Ivory	Call Me by Your Name	novel by André Aciman	
2017	Scott Neustadter and Michael H. Weber	The Disaster Artist	memoir by Greg Sestero and Tom Bissell	
2017	Aaron Sorkin	Molly's Game	memoir by Molly Bloom	
2018	Nicole Holofcener and Jeff Whitty	Can You Ever Forgive Me?	memoir by Lee Israel	
2018	Spike Lee, David Rabinowitz, Charlie Wachtel, and Kevin Willmott	BlacKkKlansman	Black Klansman by Ron Stallworth	
2018	Ryan Coogler and Joe Robert Cole	Black Panther	characters by Jack Kirby and Stan Lee	
2018	Barry Jenkins	If Beale Street Could Talk	novel by James Baldwin	
2018	Bradley Cooper, Will Fetters, and Eric Roth	A Star Is Born	A Star Is Born by William A. Wellman, Robert Carson, Dorothy Parker, and Alan Campbell	
2019	Greta Gerwig	Little Women	novel by Louisa May Alcott	
2019	Micah Fitzerman-Blue and Noah Harpster	A Beautiful Day in the Neighborhood	article "Can You Say ... Hero?" by Tom Junod	
2019	Taika Waititi	Jojo Rabbit	Caging Skies by Christine Leunens	
2019	Todd Phillips and Scott Silver	Joker	characters created by Bill Finger, Bob Kane, and Jerry Robinson	
2019	Steven Zaillian	The Irishman	I Heard You Paint Houses by Charles Brandt	

=== 2020s ===
Year	Writer(s)	Film	Source	Ref.
2020	Chloé Zhao	Nomadland	book by Jessica Bruder	
2020	Charlie Kaufman	I'm Thinking of Ending Things	novel by Iain Reid	
2020	Kemp Powers	One Night in Miami...	play by Kemp Powers	
2020	Jonathan Raymond and Kelly Reichardt	First Cow	The Half-Life by Jonathan Raymond	
2020	Ruben Santiago-Hudson	Ma Rainey's Black Bottom	play by August Wilson	
2021	Jane Campion	The Power of the Dog	novel by Thomas Savage	
2021	Sian Heder	CODA	La Famille Bélier by Victoria Bedos, Thomas Bidegain, Stanislas Carré de Malberg, and Éric Lartigau	
2021	Eric Roth, Jon Spaihts, and Denis Villeneuve	Dune	novel by Frank Herbert	
2021	Steven Levenson	tick, tick... BOOM!	musical by Jonathan Larson	
2021	Tony Kushner	West Side Story	musical by Jerome Robbins, Leonard Bernstein, Stephen Sondheim, and Arthur Laurents	
2022	Rian Johnson	Glass Onion: A Knives Out Mystery	characters by Rian Johnson	
2022	Guillermo del Toro and Patrick McHale	Guillermo del Toro's Pinocchio	The Adventures of Pinocchio by Carlo Collodi	
2022	Rebecca Lenkiewicz	She Said	book by Jodi Kantor and Megan Twohey	
2022	Samuel D. Hunter	The Whale	play by Samuel D. Hunter	
2022	Sarah Polley	Women Talking	novel by Miriam Toews	
2023	Cord Jefferson	American Fiction	Erasure by Percival Everett	
2023	Eric Roth and Martin Scorsese	Killers of the Flower Moon	book by David Grann	
2023	Christopher Nolan	Oppenheimer	American Prometheus by Kai Bird and Martin J. Sherwin	
2023	Ava DuVernay	Origin	Caste: The Origins of Our Discontents by Isabel Wilkerson	
2023	Tony McNamara	Poor Things	novel by Alasdair Gray	
2024	Peter Straughan	Conclave	novel by Robert Harris	
2024	Denis Villeneuve and Jon Spaihts	Dune: Part Two	novel by Frank Herbert	
2024	RaMell Ross, and Joslyn Barnes	Nickel Boys	novel by Colson Whitehead	
2024	Clint Bentley and Greg Kwedar	Sing Sing	"The Sing Sing Follies" by John H. Richardson, Breakin' the Mummy's Code	
2024	Winnie Holzman and Dana Fox	Wicked	musical by Stephen Schwartz and Winnie Holzman	
