= Cidade de Deus =

Cidade de Deus can refer to:

- Cidade de Deus, Rio de Janeiro, neighborhood in Rio de Janeiro, Brazil
- Cidade de Deus (Osasco), building complex in Osasco, São Paulo, Brazil
- City of God (Lins novel) (original title: Cidade de Deus), 1997 novel by Paulo Lins
- Cidade de Deus (film), 2002 Brazilian film by Fernando Meirelles and Kátia Lund, based on the above
