= City of Men (film) =

2007 film directed by Paulo Morelli

- Brazilian theatrical release poster
- Portuguese: Cidade dos Homens
- Directed by: Paulo Morelli
- Screenplay by: Elena Soarez
- Story by: Elena Soarez; Paulo Morelli
- Based on: Cidade dos Homens by: Fernando Meirelles; Kátia Lund
- Produced by: Andrea Barata Ribeiro; Bel Berlinck; Fernando Meirelles; Paulo Morelli
- Starring: Darlan Cunha; Douglas Silva; Jonathan Haagensen; Rodrigo dos Santos; Camila Monteiro; Naima Silva; Eduardo Br; Luciano Vidigal; Pedro Henrique; Vítor Olivera; Vincus Olivera
- Cinematography: Adriano Goldman
- Edited by: Daniel Rezende
- Music by: Antonio Pinto
- Production companies: O2 Filmes; Globo Filmes; Fox Film
- Distributed by: Petrobras Distribuidora (Brazil); Miramax Films (United States)
- Release date: August 31, 2007
- Running time: 106 minutes
- Countries: Brazil; United States
- Language: Portuguese
- Box office: $2.6 million

City of Men (Portuguese: Cidade dos Homens) is a 2007 Brazilian drama film directed by Paulo Morelli. The screenplay was written by Elena Soarez, based on a story by Morelli and Soarez. It is a film version of the TV series Cidade dos Homens that ran for four seasons in Brazil following the international success of the film City of God (2002); both directed by producer Fernando Meirelles. The film was released on August 31, 2007, in the United States by Miramax Films (who also distributed City of God in the US) and in Brazil by Petrobras Distribuidora. It received positive reviews from critics.

== Plot ==
Best friends Acerola ("Ace") and Laranjinha ("Wallace") live in the favelas of Rio de Janeiro, and have been raised without their fathers. They are turning eighteen as a war between rival drug gangs begins around them. Wallace, with Ace's help, gets to meet his father, Heraldo, in person, a parolee living not very far away, only to witness the police arrest of his father a few days after. Wallace and Ace discover that their fathers were best friends, but Heraldo killed Ace's father in a robbery incident. Each discovers things about his missing father that could potentially compromise their solid friendship. At the end, they decide to leave "the Hill" and lead a responsible life.

== Cast ==
- Douglas Silva as Acerola, "Ace"
- Darlan Cunha as Laranjinha, or "Wallace"
- Jonathan Haagensen as Madrugadão
- Rodrigo dos Santos as Heraldo
- Camila Monteiro as Cris
- Naima Silva as Camila
- Eduardo Br as Nefasto
- Luciano Vidigal as Fiel
- Pedro Henrique as Caju
- Vítor and Vincus Olivera as Clayton

== Reception ==
=== Critical response ===
On review aggregator website Rotten Tomatoes, City of Men currently has an approval rating of 74% and an average score of 6.7 out of 10, based on 82 critic reviews. The site's critical consensus reads, "Brutal and unflinching, City of Men is both a harrowing look at Brazil's favela life, and a touching tale of youths rushed into adulthood." The film also receives a weighted average rating of 63 out of 100 on Metacritic based on 25 critic reviews, indicating "generally favorable" reviews.

=== Accolades ===
- Best Special Effects - 2007 Cinema Brazil Grand Prize (nominated)
