= Washington D.C. Area Film Critics Association Awards 2003 =

Annual US film awards ceremony

2nd WAFCA Awards
- Date: December 19, 2003

Highlights
- Best Film: The Lord of the Rings: The Return of the King
- Best Director: Peter Jackson for The Lord of the Rings: The Return of the King
- Best Actor: Bill Murray
- Best Actress: Naomi Watts

The 2nd Washington D.C. Area Film Critics Association Awards, honoring the best in filmmaking in 2003, were given on December 19, 2003.

== Winners and nominees ==
Best Film

- The Lord of the Rings: The Return of the King

- City of God
- Lost in Translation
- Master and Commander: The Far Side of the World
- Mystic River

Best Actor

- Bill Murray – Lost in Translation

- Johnny Depp – Pirates of the Caribbean: The Curse of the Black Pearl
- Chiwetel Ejiofor – Dirty Pretty Things
- Ben Kingsley – House of Sand and Fog
- Sean Penn – Mystic River

Best Actress

- Naomi Watts – 21 Grams

- Cate Blanchett – Veronica Guerin
- Keisha Castle-Hughes – Whale Rider
- Diane Keaton – Something's Gotta Give
- Evan Rachel Wood – Thirteen

Best Supporting Actor

- Benicio del Toro – 21 Grams

- Alec Baldwin – The Cooler
- Tim Robbins – Mystic River
- Peter Sarsgaard – Shattered Glass
- Ken Watanabe – The Last Samurai

Best Supporting Actress

- Anna Deavere Smith – The Human Stain

- Sarah Bolger – In America
- Holly Hunter – Thirteen
- Ludivine Sagnier – Swimming Pool
- Renée Zellweger – Cold Mountain

Best Director

- Peter Jackson – The Lord of the Rings: The Return of the King

- Sofia Coppola – Lost in Translation
- Clint Eastwood – Mystic River
- Fernando Meirelles and Kátia Lund – City of God
- Peter Weir – Master and Commander: The Far Side of the World

Best Ensemble

- Love Actually

- The Lord of the Rings: The Return of the King
- Master and Commander: The Far Side of the World
- A Mighty Wind
- Mystic River

Best Original Screenplay

- Sofia Coppola – Lost in Translation

- Guillermo Arriaga – 21 Grams
- Steven Knight – Dirty Pretty Things
- Andrew Stanton, Bob Peterson, and David Reynolds – Finding Nemo
- Catherine Hardwicke and Nikki Reed – Thirteen

Best Adapted Screenplay

- Brian Helgeland – Mystic River

- Bráulio Mantovani – City of God
- Peter Jackson, Fran Walsh, and Philippa Boyens – The Lord of the Rings: The Return of the King
- Peter Weir and John Collee – Master and Commander: The Far Side of the World
- Billy Ray – Shattered Glass

Best Animated Film

- Finding Nemo

- Brother Bear
- The Triplets of Belleville
- Looney Tunes: Back in Action
- Rugrats Go Wild

Best Documentary Film

- The Fog of War

- Amandla!: A Revolution in Four-Part Harmony
- Capturing the Friedmans
- Step into Liquid
- Tupac: Resurrection

Best Guilty Pleasure

- Pirates of the Caribbean: The Curse of the Black Pearl

- 2 Fast 2 Furious
- Charlie's Angels: Full Throttle
- Freaky Friday
- Willard
