= Adriano Goldman =

Brazilian television director and cinematographer

- Born: February 1966 (age 60); São Paulo, Brazil
- Occupations: Television director, cinematographer
- Awards: Primetime Emmy Award; Excellence in Cinematography Award (2009 Sundance Film Festival)

Adriano Goldman (born February 1966) is a Brazilian television director and cinematographer born in São Paulo, Brazil. He won "Excellence in Cinematography Award: Dramatic" during the 2009 Sundance Film Festival for his cinematography in Cary Joji Fukunaga's 2009 film Sin Nombre.

His first short, Is Reinaldo Still Swimming?, won top prize at both the São Paulo Fotoptica Video Festival and the Havana Film Festival (Festival Internacional del Nuevo Cine Latinoamericano) in Havana, Cuba.

Goldman worked in music videos and commercials, and filmed a number of musical concerts, particularly with MTV Brasil, where he directed the inaugural acoustic program "Unplugged". His video of Sepultura's "Orgasmatron," won the International Viewer's Choice Award at the MTV Video Music Awards.

He also won three ABC Trophies for Rede Globo/O2 Filmes hit series City of Men (winning 2002 ABC Trophy for Best Cinematography in a Television Series) as well as for Sons of Carnival (Filhos do Carnaval) directed by Cao Hamburger and for cinematography of Hamburger's The Year My Parents Went on Vacation (O Ano em Que Meus Pais Sairam de Férias).

For his work on the Netflix series The Crown, he won a Primetime Emmy Award in the category of Outstanding Cinematography for a Single-Camera Series (One Hour) in the 70th Primetime Creative Arts Emmy Awards.

== Filmography ==
=== Film ===
Year	Title	Director	Notes
2003	Casseta & Planeta: A Taça do Mundo É Nossa	Lula Buarque de Hollanda	
2005	O Casamento de Romeu e Julieta	Bruno Barreto	
2006	The Year My Parents Went on Vacation	Cao Hamburger	
2007	City of Men	Paulo Morelli	
2008	Romance	Guel Arraes	
2009	Sin nombre	Cary Joji Fukunaga	
2009	Som & Fúria: O Filme	Fernando Meirelles; Toniko Melo	With André Modugno and Marcelo Trotta
2010	Conviction	Tony Goldwyn	
2011	Jane Eyre	Cary Joji Fukunaga	
2011	360	Fernando Meirelles	
2012	Xingu	Cao Hamburger	
2012	The Company You Keep	Robert Redford	
2013	Closed Circuit	John Crowley	
2013	August: Osage County	John Wells	
2014	Trash	Stephen Daldry	
2015	Burnt	John Wells	
2017	Dark River	Clio Barnard	
2019	Gully	Nabil Elderkin	
2026	Savage House	Peter Glanz	

Short film

Year	Title	Director
1997	Lápide	Paulo Morelli

Documentary film

Year	Title	Director	Notes
2002	Surf Adventures: O Filme	Arthur Fontes	With Sérgio Leandro and Mauro Pinheiro Jr.

=== Television ===
Year	Title	Notes
2000	A Família Braz	Documentary series
2002	Cidade dos Homens	
2006	Filhos do Carnaval	
2008	Alice	12 episodes
2009	Som & Fúria	
2016-2023	The Crown	28 episodes
2022	Andor	6 episodes
2026	Harry Potter	
