= Daniel Rezende =

Brazilian film editor and director (born 1975)

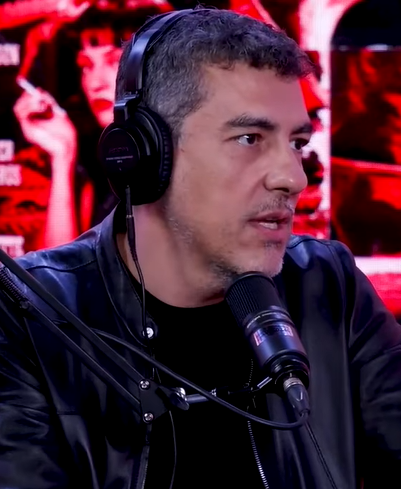
- Rezende in 2025
- Born: May 5, 1975 (age 51); São Paulo, Brazil
- Years active: 2002–present

Daniel Rezende (born May 5, 1975) is a Brazilian film editor and director. He won the BAFTA Award for Best Editing for his work on the 2002 film City of God and was also nominated for an Academy Award for Best Film Editing for the same film. City of God was listed as the 17th best-edited film of all time in a 2012 survey of members of the Motion Picture Editors Guild. In a 2003 interview to Channel 4, Rezende has described the editing process of City of God, saying he tried to "provoke differing sensations in each of the film's phases". In addition to the international nominations and awards received for City of God, Rezende's editing has frequently been recognized by regional awards in his native Brazil and in Argentina. Rezende has also given a master editing class at the prestigious international film school EICTV in 2011.

In 2017, Rezende made his debut as film director with Bingo: The King of the Mornings (Bingo: O Rei das Manhãs).

== Filmography ==
=== Editor ===
- 2002 - Armas e Paz (Walter Salles and Daniela Thomas)
- 2002 - City of God (Fernando Meirelles and Kátia Lund)
- 2003 - Narradores de Javé (Eliane Caffé)
- 2004 - The Motorcycle Diaries (Walter Salles)
- 2005 - Dark Water (Walter Salles)
- 2006 - The Year My Parents Went on Vacation (Cao Hamburger)
- 2007 - Elite Squad (José Padilha)
- 2007 - City of Men (Paulo Morelli)
- 2008 - Blindness (Fernando Meirelles)
- 2010 - As Melhores Coisas do Mundo (Laís Bodanzky)
- 2010 - Elite Squad: The Enemy Within (José Padilha)
- 2011 - The Tree of Life (Terrence Malick)
- 2011 - 360 (Fernando Meirelles)
- 2014 - RoboCop (José Padilha)
- 2018 - Entebbe (José Padilha)

=== Director ===
- 2017 - Bingo: The King of the Mornings
- 2019 - Monica and Friends: Bonds
- 2019 - Nobody's Looking

== See also ==
- List of film director and editor collaborations
