= Blindness (2008 film) =

2008 film directed by Fernando Meirelles

- Theatrical release poster
- Directed by: Fernando Meirelles
- Screenplay by: Don McKellar
- Based on: Blindness by José Saramago
- Produced by: Niv Fichman; Andrea Barata Ribeiro; Sonoko Sakai
- Starring: Julianne Moore; Mark Ruffalo; Alice Braga; Yusuke Iseya; Yoshino Kimura; Don McKellar; Maury Chaykin; Mitchell Nye; Danny Glover; Gael García Bernal
- Cinematography: César Charlone
- Edited by: Daniel Rezende
- Music by: Uakti
- Production companies: O2 Filmes; Rhombus Media; Bee Vine Pictures
- Distributed by: 20th Century Fox (Brazil); Alliance Films (Canada); GAGA USEN (Japan); Pathé (United Kingdom); Focus Features International (International)
- Release date: 14 May 2008 (Cannes)
- Running time: 121 minutes
- Countries: Brazil; Canada; Japan; United Kingdom
- Languages: English; Japanese
- Budget: $25 million
- Box office: $19.8−20.1 million

Blindness is a 2008 English-language thriller film about a society that suffers an epidemic of blindness. The film is an adaptation of the 1995 novel by Portuguese author José Saramago. The film was written by Don McKellar and directed by Fernando Meirelles, and stars Julianne Moore as the doctor's wife and Mark Ruffalo as the doctor. Saramago originally refused to sell the rights for a film adaptation, but the producers were able to acquire it with the condition that the film would be set in an unnamed and unrecognizable city. Blindness premiered as the opening film at the Cannes Film Festival on May 14, 2008, and was released in Canada as part of the Toronto International Film Festival on September 6, 2008.

== Plot ==
The film begins with a young professional suddenly going blind in his car while at an intersection, with his field of vision turning white. A seemingly kind passerby offers to drive him home. However, he then steals the blind man's car. When the blind man's wife returns home, she takes him to an ophthalmologist who can identify nothing wrong and refers him for further evaluation.

The next day, the doctor goes blind, and recognizes that the blindness must be caused by a communicable disease. Around the city, more citizens are struck blind, causing widespread panic, and the government organizes a quarantine for the blind in a derelict asylum. When a hazmat crew arrives to pick up the doctor, his wife lies that she has also gone blind in order to accompany him.

In the asylum, the doctor and his wife are first to arrive and agree they will keep her sight a secret. They are joined by several others, including the driver, the thief, and other patients of the doctor. At this point, the "white sickness" has become international, with hundreds of cases reported every day. The government is resorting to increasingly ruthless measures to try to deal with the epidemic, including refusing aid to the blind.

As more blinded people are crammed into what has become a concentration camp, overcrowding and lack of outside support cause hygiene and living conditions to quickly degrade. The doctor serves as the representative of his ward, and his sighted wife does what she can to assist her fellow inmates without revealing her ability. Anxiety over the availability of food undermines morale and introduces conflict between the prison's wards, as the soldiers who guard the camp become increasingly hostile.

A man with a handgun appoints himself "king" of his ward, and takes control of the food deliveries, first demanding the other wards' valuables, and then for the women to have sex with their men. In an effort to obtain necessities, several women reluctantly submit to being raped. One of the women is killed by her assailant, and the doctor's wife retaliates, killing the "king" with a pair of scissors. Independently, other raped women sneak to the dead king's ward and set it on fire, which rapidly engulfs the building, with many inmates dying in the ensuing chaos. The survivors who escape the building discover that the guards have abandoned their posts, and they venture out into the city.

Society has collapsed, with the city's population reduced to an aimless, zombie-like struggle to survive. The doctor's wife leads her husband and a few others from their ward in search of food and shelter. She discovers a well-stocked basement storeroom beneath a grocery store, barely escaping with aid from her husband when the throng around her smell the fresh food she is carrying.

The doctor and his wife invite their new "family" to their apartment, where they establish a mutually supportive long-term home. Then, just as suddenly as his sight had been lost, the driver – the first person to lose his sight – recovers his sight, indicating that the body had fought off the disease, and that the blindness is ultimately temporary. They celebrate and their hope is restored.

== Cast ==
- Julianne Moore as the Doctor's Wife, the only person immune to the epidemic of blindness. Her sight is kept a secret by her husband and others, though as time goes on, she feels isolated in being the only one with sight. Moore described her character's responsibility: "Her biggest concern in the beginning is simply her husband. But her ability to see ultimately both isolates her and makes her into a leader." The director also gave Moore's character a wardrobe that would match the actor's skin and dyed blond hair, giving her the appearance of a "pale angel".
- Mark Ruffalo as the Doctor. The doctor also becomes something of a leader; in an early scene, he reveals that he has been elected as his ward's official representative to the rest of the community. Meirelles originally sought to cast actor Daniel Craig as Doctor, but negotiations were not finalized. Ruffalo said that his character loses the illusion of his self-perspective and perceives his wife as being a person he could aspire to. Ruffalo said, "That's a very difficult moment for anybody, to have all their perceptions completely shattered, but I think the Doctor finally comes to a peace about his inabilities and his downfall, and admits to an admiration for his wife's strengths." The actor wore a layer of makeup to appear older and also wore contact lenses to be blind while having his eyes open. The actor said of the experience as a blind character, "At first it's terrifying and then it's frustrating and then it gets quiet... we're tormented by our eyesight... you don't know this until you go blind... As an actor I suddenly felt free."
- Danny Glover as Man with Black Eye Patch. Glover described his character: "The Man with the Black Eye Patch comes into this new world of blindness already half blind, so I think he understands where he is within his own truth, within himself. I did feel like this character was very much like Saramago because he is completely unapologetic—he is who he is and he accepts who he is." Glover explained his involvement with the role, "When you are blind you try to adopt another kind of sensitivity, so this role is definitely a challenge from a physical point of view."
- Gael García Bernal as Bartender/King of Ward 3, one of the film's villains. In defiance of the doctor's democratic efforts and election as leader of Ward 1, the bartender declares himself "King of Ward 3" and gains immediate popularity from his "subjects" by prioritizing food over his ward's community responsibilities such as burying the dead. He somehow obtains a revolver and uses it to bully the other wards by controlling the food supply. Meirelles followed the advice of Brazilian stage director Antunes Filho and changed the character from the novel by making him more ambiguous, explaining, "In the book, he is really a mean guy, terribly evil from the beginning... but I thought it was more interesting to have him be not evil but more like a child with a gun." Bernal described the result of his character, "I think the King is just very practical, very pragmatic. He appears cold because he is not an idealist and does not see hope, but he is a survivor, the same as all the others." The doctor's wife kills him with a pair of medical scissors to the neck. His death marks the point when Ward 1 takes back control, with the doctor's wife's threat to kill one of the men from Ward 3 for every day her ward goes without food.
- Maury Chaykin as Accountant, who helps the King of Ward 3 bully the members of the other wards. Because he has been blind since birth, the Accountant is much more used to relying on his other senses, which gives him a major advantage over the other prisoners; he assumes control over Ward 3 and the food supplies for the community after the King is murdered.
- Alice Braga as woman with dark glasses. Braga described her character as mysterious, believing, "While she does sleep with men because it is easy money, I did not want to treat her purely as a prostitute. She starts out quite tough, but she develops very strong maternal feelings." Meirelles explained that the character's glasses and cascading hair gave her a cold appearance, but through her scenes with the orphaned Boy with the Squint, she develops warmth.
- Don McKellar as thief. McKellar, who wrote the screenplay for the film, had also acted in the past and was cast as the character. The screenwriter described the Thief, "I like the trick where you think the Thief is a bad guy. He's a pathetic character you first believe is the villain of the piece and then you realize that, no, he's not even close to that. There's something charming about his desperation because, after a point, you meet the King of Ward Three and learn what real desperation is."
- Sandra Oh as Minister of Health.
- Yusuke Iseya as first blind man.
- Yoshino Kimura as first blind man's wife.
- Niv Fichman as Israeli scientist.
- Douglas Silva as an onlooker. Silva has previously acted in many Meirelles films, including the 2002 film City of God.
- Daniel Zettel as an onlooker. Zettel has previously acted in many Meirelles films, including the 2002 film City of God.

Meirelles chose an international cast. Producer Niv Fichman explained Meirelles' intent: "He was inspired by [Saramago's] great masterwork to create a microcosm of the world. He wanted it cast in a way to represent all of humanity."

== Production ==
=== Development ===
The rights to the 1995 novel Blindness were closely guarded by author José Saramago. Saramago explained, "I always resisted because it's a violent book about social degradation, rape, and I didn't want it to fall into the wrong hands." Director Fernando Meirelles had wanted to direct a film adaptation in 1997, perceiving it as "an allegory about the fragility of civilization". Saramago originally refused to sell the rights to Meirelles, Whoopi Goldberg, or Gael García Bernal. In 1999, producer Niv Fichman and Canadian screenwriter Don McKellar visited Saramago in the Canary Islands; Saramago allowed their visit on condition that they not discuss buying the rights. McKellar explained the changes he intended to make from the novel and what the focus would be, and two days later he and Fichman left Saramago's home with the rights. McKellar believed they had succeeded where others had failed because they properly researched Saramago; he was suspicious of the film industry and had therefore resisted other studios' efforts to obtain the rights through large sums of money alone. Conditions set by Saramago were for the film to be set in a country that would not be recognizable to audiences, and that the canine in the novel, the Dog of Tears, should be a big dog.

Meirelles originally envisioned doing the film in Portuguese similar to the novel's original language, but instead directed the film in English, saying, "If you do it in English you can sell it to the whole world and have a bigger audience." Meirelles set the film in a contemporary large city, seemingly under a totalitarian government. Meirelles chose to make a contemporary film so audiences could relate to the characters. The director also sought a different allegorical approach. He described the novel as "very allegorical, like a fantasy outside of space, outside the world", and he instead took a naturalistic direction in engaging audiences to make the film less "cold."

=== Writing ===
Don McKellar said about adapting the story, "None of the characters even have names or a history, which is very untraditional for a Hollywood story. The film, like the novel, directly addresses sight and point of view and asks you to see things from a different perspective." McKellar wrote the script so audiences would see the world through the eyes of the protagonist, the doctor's wife. He sought to have them question the humanity of how she observes but does not act in various situations, including a rape scene. He consulted Saramago about why the wife took so long to act. McKellar noted, "He said she became aware of the responsibility that comes with seeing gradually, first to herself, then to her husband, then to her small family, then her ward, and finally to the world where she has to create a new civilization." The screenwriter wrote out the "actions and circumstances" that would allow the wife to find her responsibility. While the completed script was mostly faithful to the novel, McKellar went through several drafts that were not. One such saw him veer away from the novel by creating names and backstories for all the characters. Another significantly changed the chronology. Only after these abortive attempts did McKellar decide to cut the backstories and focus primarily on the doctor and his wife. He attempted to reconnect with what originally drew him to the novel: what he called its "existential simplicity". The novel defines its characters by little more than their present actions; doing the same for the adaptation became "an interesting exercise" for McKellar.

McKellar attended a summer camp for the blind as part of his research. He wanted to observe how blind people interacted in groups. He discovered that excessive expositional dialogue, usually frowned upon by writers, was essential for the groups. McKellar cut one of the last lines in the novel from his screenplay: "I don't think we did go blind, I think we are blind. Blind but seeing. Blind people who can see, but do not see." McKellar believed viewers would by that point have already grasped the symbolism and didn't want the script to seem heavy-handed. He also toned down the visual cues in his screenplay, such as the "brilliant milky whiteness" of blindness described in the novel. McKellar knew he wanted a stylistically adept director and didn't want to be too prescriptive, preferring only to hint at an approach.

=== Filming and casting ===
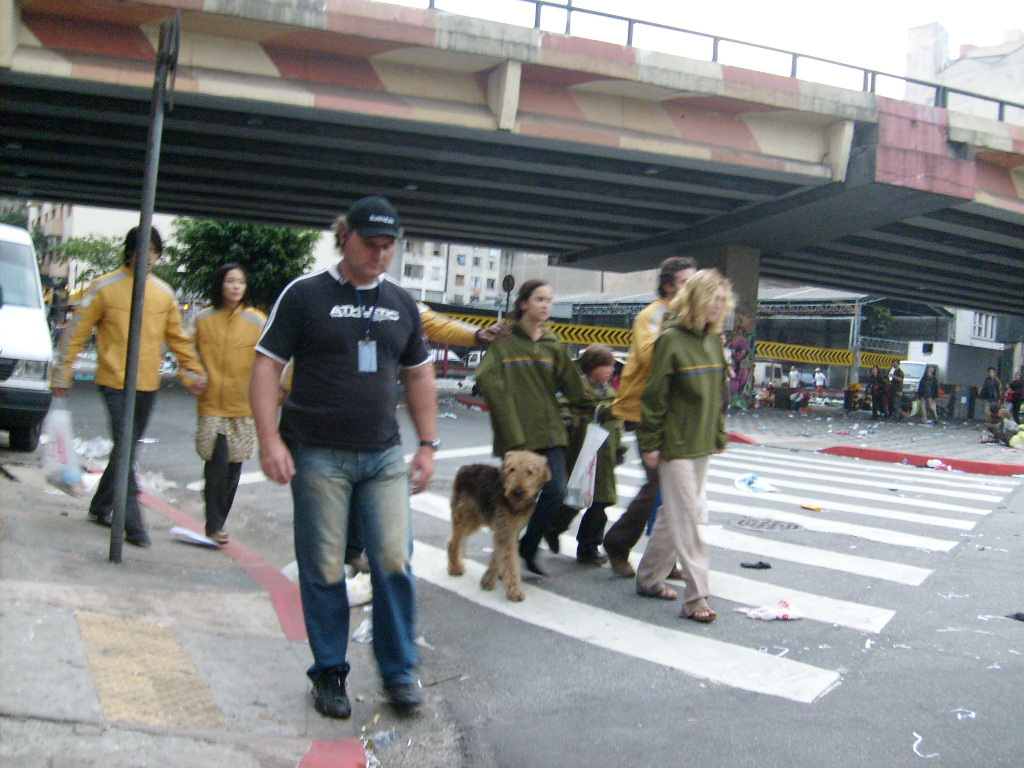
Filming in São Paulo

Meirelles chose São Paulo as the primary backdrop for Blindness, though scenes were also filmed in Osasco, São Paulo, Brazil; Guelph, Ontario, Canada; and Montevideo, Uruguay. With all the characters aside from Julianne Moore's character being blind, the cast was trained to simulate blindness. The director also stylized the film to reflect the lack of point of view that the characters would experience. Meirelles said several actors he talked to were intimidated by the concept of playing characters without names: "I offered the film to some actors who said, 'I can't play a character with no name, with no history, with no past. With Gael (García Bernal), he said, 'I never think about the past. I just think what my character wants.'"

By September 2006, Fernando Meirelles was attached to Blindness, with the script being adapted by Don McKellar. Blindness, budgeted at $25 million as part of a Brazilian and Canadian co-production, was slated to begin filming in summer 2007 in the towns of São Paulo and Guelph. Filming began in early July in São Paulo and Guelph. Filming also took place in Montevideo, Uruguay. São Paulo served as the primary backdrop for Blindness, as it is a city mostly unfamiliar to North American and European audiences. With its relative obscurity, the director sought São Paulo as the film's generic location. Filming continued through autumn of 2007.

The cast and crew included 700 extras who had to be trained to simulate blindness. Actor Christian Duurvoort from Meirelles' City of God led a series of workshops to coach the cast members. Duurvoort had researched the mannerisms of blind people to understand how they perceive the world and how they make their way through space. Duurvoort not only taught the extras mannerisms, but also to convey the emotional and psychological states of blind people. One technique was reacting to others as a blind person, whose reactions are usually different from those of a sighted person. Meirelles described, "When you're talking to someone, you see a reaction. When you're blind, the response is much flatter. What's the point [in reacting]?"

=== Filmmaking style ===
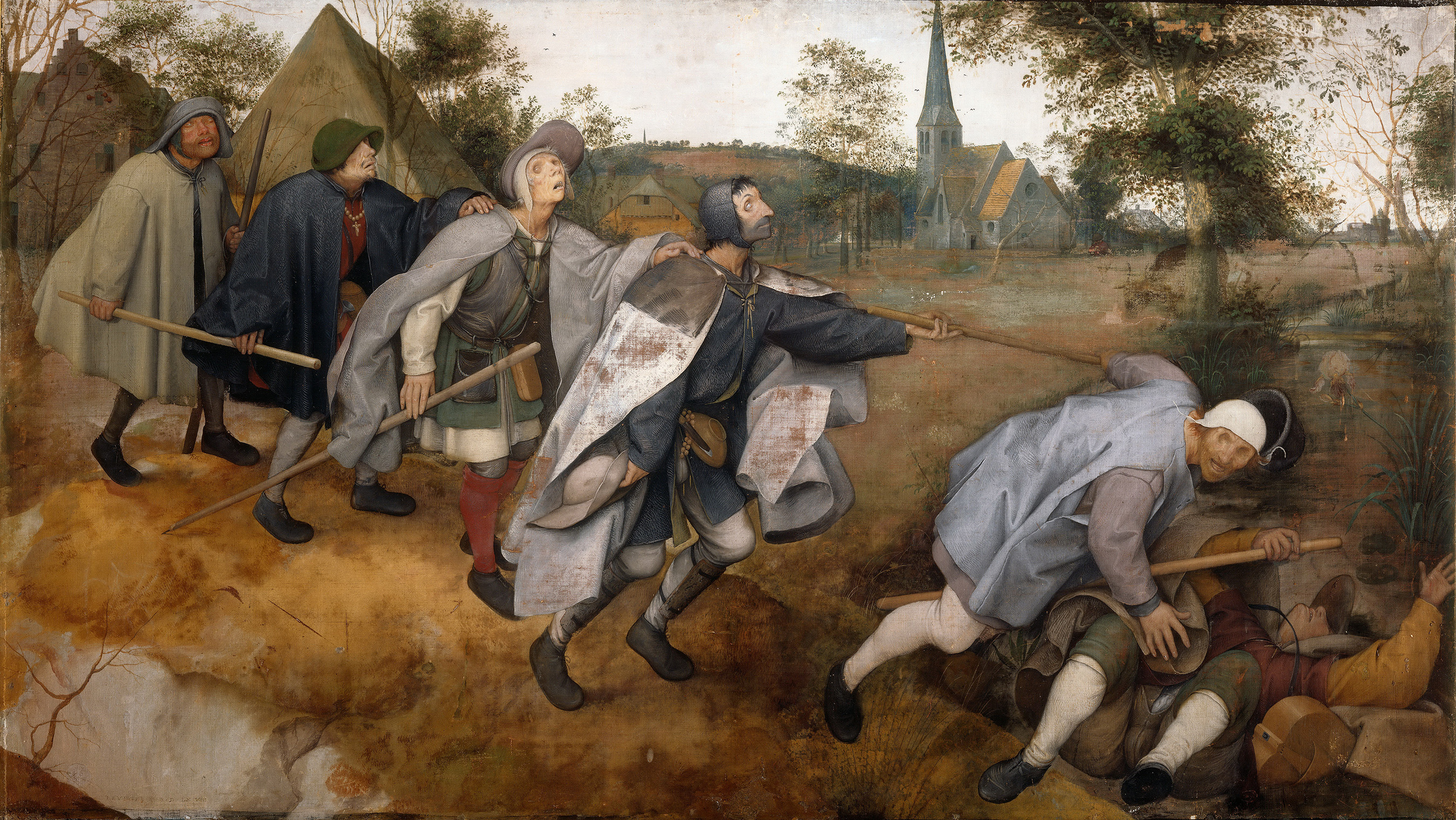
Director Fernando Meirelles alludes to Pieter Bruegel the Elder's 1568 painting The Parable of the Blind in the film Blindness.

Meirelles acknowledged the challenge of making a film that would simulate the experience of blindness to the audience. He explained, "When you do a film, everything is related to point of view, to vision. When you have two characters in a dialogue, emotion is expressed by the way people look at each other, through the eyes. Especially in the cut, the edit. You usually cut when someone looks over. Film is all about point of view, and in this film there is none." Similar to the book, blindness in the film serves as a metaphor for human nature's dark side: "prejudice, selfishness, violence and willful indifference."

With only one character's point of view available, Meirelles sought to switch the points-of-view throughout the film, seeing three distinct stylistic sections. The director began with an omniscient vantage point, transited to the intact viewpoint of the doctor's wife, and changed again to the Man with the Black Eye Patch, who connects the quarantined to the outside world with stories. The director concluded the switching with the combination of the perspective of the Doctor's Wife and the narrative of the Man with the Black Eye Patch.

The film also contains visual cues, such as the 1568 painting The Parable of the Blind by Pieter Bruegel the Elder. Allusions to other famous artworks are also made. Meirelles described the intent: "It's about image, the film, and vision, so I thought it makes sense to create, not a history of painting, because it's not, but having different ways of seeing things, from Rembrandt to these very contemporary artists. But it's a very subtle thing."

== Release ==
=== Theatrical run ===
Prior to public release, Meirelles screened Blindness to test audiences. A screening of his first cut in Toronto resulted in ten percent of the audience, nearly 50 people, walking out of the film early. Meirelles ascribed the problem to a rape scene that takes place partway through the film, and edited the scene to be much shorter in the final cut. Meirelles explained his goal, "When I shot and edited these scenes, I did it in a very technical way, I worried about how to light it and so on, and I lost the sense of their brutality. Some women were really angry with the film, and I thought, 'Wow, maybe I crossed the line.' I went back not to please the audience but so they would stay involved until the end of the story." He also found that a New York City test screening expressed concern about a victim in the film failing to take revenge; Meirelles ascribed this as a reflection of what Americans have learned to expect in their cinema.

Focus Features acquired the right to handle international sales for Blindness. Pathé acquired UK and French rights to distribute the film, and Miramax Films won U.S. distribution rights with its $5 million bid. Blindness premiered as the opening film at the 61st Cannes Film Festival on May 14, 2008, where it received a "tepid reception". Straw polls of critics were "unkind" to the film.

Blindness was screened at the Toronto International Film Festival in September 2008 as a Special Presentation. The film also opened at the Atlantic Film Festival on September 11, 2008, and had its North American theatrical release on October 3, 2008. It also premiered in Japan at the Tokyo International Film Festival on October 19, 2008, before releasing theatrically on November 22.

=== Critical reception ===
Despite being on a number of critics' top 10 lists for 2008, the film received "mixed or average" reviews on Metacritic, which sampled 31 critic reviews and calculated a weighted average score of 45 out of 100. According to Rotten Tomatoes, 44% of 160 critics have given the film a positive review, and the average rating is 5.3/10. The consensus on the website reads, "This allegorical disaster film about society's reaction to mass blindness is mottled and self-satisfied; provocative but not as interesting as its premise implies."

Screen International's Cannes screen jury which annually polls a panel of international film critics gave the film a 1.3 average out of 4, placing the film on the lower-tier of all the films screened at competition in 2008. Of the film critics from the Screen International Cannes critics jury, Alberto Crespi of the Italian publication L'Unità, Michel Ciment of French film magazine Positif and Dohoon Kim of South Korean film publication Cine21, all gave the film zero points (out of four).

Kirk Honeycutt of The Hollywood Reporter described Blindness as "provocative but predictable cinema", startling but failing to surprise. Honeycutt criticized the film's two viewpoints: Julianne Moore's character, the only one who can see, is slow to act against atrocities, and the behavior of Danny Glover's character comes off as "slightly pompous". Honeycutt explained, "This philosophical coolness is what most undermines the emotional response to Meirelles' film. His fictional calculations are all so precise and a tone of deadly seriousness swamps the grim action." Justin Chang of Variety described the film: "Blindness emerges onscreen both overdressed and undermotivated, scrupulously hitting the novel's beats yet barely approximating, so to speak, its vision." Chang thought that Julianne Moore gave a strong performance but did not feel that the film captured the impact of Saramago's novel. Roger Ebert called Blindness "one of the most unpleasant, not to say unendurable, films I've ever seen." A. O. Scott of The New York Times stated that, although it "is not a great film, ... it is, nonetheless, full of examples of what good filmmaking looks like."

Stephen Garrett of Esquire complimented Meirelles' unconventional style: "Meirelles [honors] the material by using elegant, artful camera compositions, beguiling sound design and deft touches of digital effects to accentuate the authenticity of his cataclysmic landscape." Despite the praise, Garrett wrote that Meirelles' talent at portraying real-life injustice in City of God and The Constant Gardener did not suit him for directing the "heightened reality" of Saramago's social commentary.

Peter Bradshaw of The Guardian called it "an intelligent, tightly constructed, supremely confident adaptation": "Meirelles, along with screenwriter Don McKellar and cinematographer Cesar Charlone, have created an elegant, gripping and visually outstanding film. It responds to the novel's notes of apocalypse and dystopia, and its disclosure of a spiritual desert within the modern city, but also to its persistent qualities of fable, paradox and even whimsy." "Blindness is a drum-tight drama, with superb, hallucinatory, images of urban collapse. It has a real coil of horror at its centre, yet is lightened with gentleness and humour. It reminded me of George A Romero's Night of the Living Dead, and Peter Shaffer's absurdist stage-play Black Comedy. This is bold, masterly, film-making."

The Boston Globe's Wesley Morris raved about the leading actress: "Julianne Moore is a star for these terrible times. She tends to be at her best when the world is at its worst. And things are pretty bad in "Blindness," a perversely enjoyable, occasionally harrowing adaptation of José Saramago's 1995 disaster allegory. [...] "Blindness" is a movie whose sense of crisis feels right on time, even if the happy ending feels like a gratuitous emotional bailout. Meirelles ensures that the obviousness of the symbolism (in the global village the blind need guidance!) doesn't negate the story's power, nor the power of Moore's performance. The more dehumanizing things get, the fiercer she becomes."

The film appeared on some critics' top ten lists of the best films of 2008. Bill White of the Seattle Post-Intelligencer named it the 5th best film of 2008, and Marc Savlov of The Austin Chronicle named it the 8th best film of 2008.

=== Awards and accolades ===
Award	Category	Recipient	Result
Saturn Awards	Best Actress	Julianne Moore	Nominated
Cannes Film Festival	Palme d'Or	Fernando Meirelles	Nominated

=== Author's reaction ===
Meirelles screened Blindness privately for Saramago. When the film ended, Saramago was in tears, and said: "Fernando, I am as happy to have seen this movie as I was the day I finished the book."

=== Protests ===
The film has been strongly criticized by several organizations representing the blind community. Dr. Marc Maurer, President of the National Federation of the Blind, said: "The National Federation of the Blind condemns and deplores this film, which will do substantial harm to the blind of America and the world." A press release from the American Council of the Blind said "...it is quite obvious why blind people would be outraged over this movie. Blind people do not behave like uncivilized, animalized creatures." The National Federation of the Blind announced plans to picket theaters in at least 21 states, in the largest protest in the organization's 68-year history. José Saramago has described his novel as allegorically depicting "a blindness of rationality". He dismissed the protests, stating that "stupidity doesn't choose between the blind and the non-blind."

== See also ==
- The Day of the Triffids, the 1951 John Wyndham novel (and its many adaptations) about societal collapse following widespread blindness.
- "Many, Many Monkeys", an episode from The Twilight Zone (1985 TV series) with a similar premise.
- "The Country of the Blind", a short story by H. G. Wells.
