= Zé Pequeno =

Brazilian drug trafficker (1957–1985)

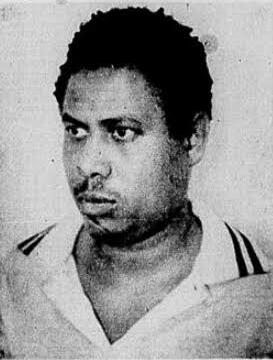
José (Zé Pequeno) in 1980.

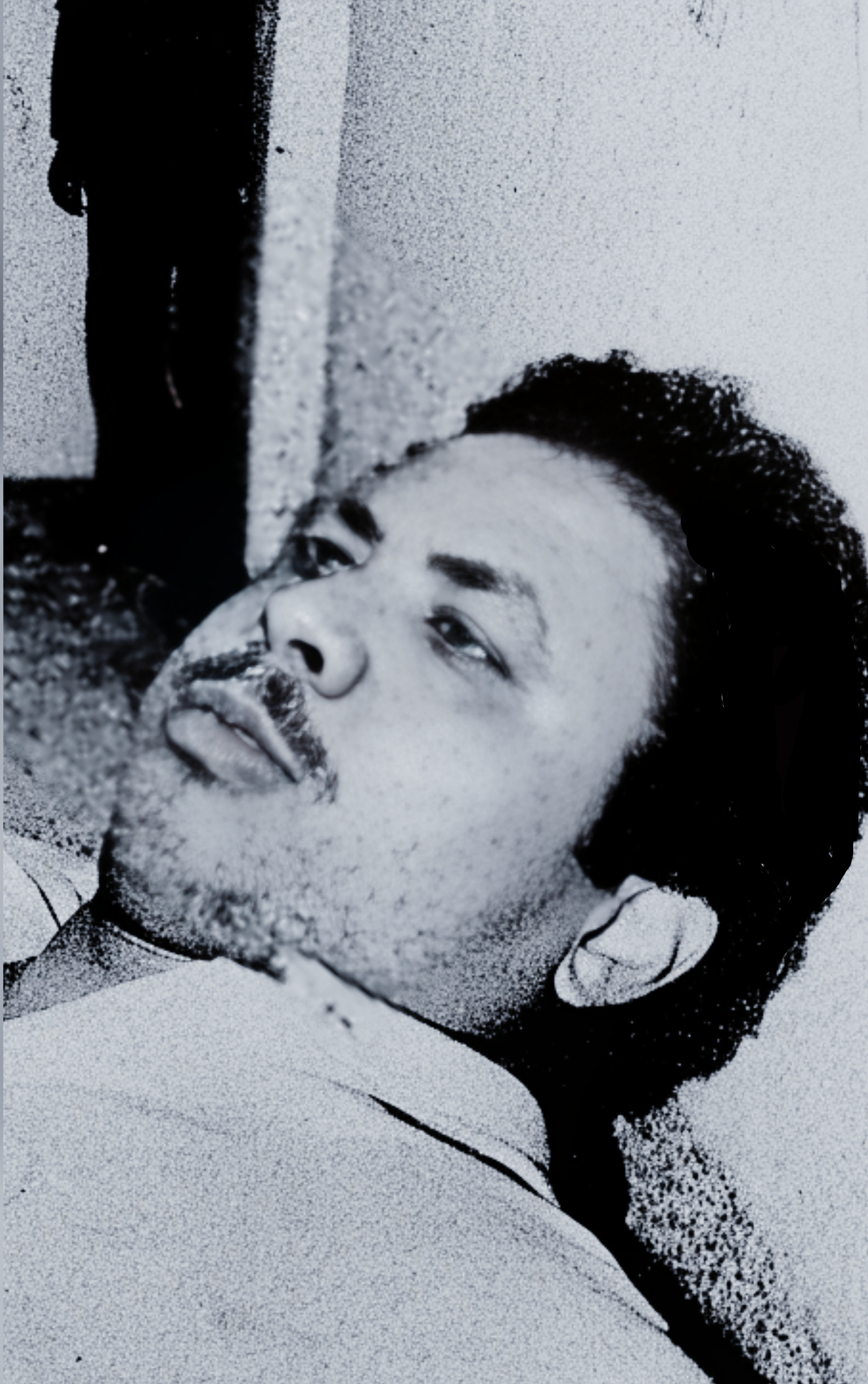
The body of Ze Pequeno in 1985

José Eduardo Barreto Conceição (1957–1985), better known by the nickname Zé Pequeno (and formerly as Dadinho), was a Brazilian drug trafficker. He was a major criminal figure in the Cidade de Deus favela of Rio de Janeiro during the 1970s and 1980s. He rose to posthumous fame, thanks to the success of the 2002 Brazilian film City of God, in which he was played by Leandro Firmino (as an adult) and Douglas Silva (as a child). Starting out as a petty thief, Zé Pequeno became notorious in the favela for his cruel methods. He had a longstanding rivalry with Mane Galinha, and was eventually killed by the Valzinho gang in 1985.
