= Jonathan Haagensen =

Brazilian actor, model, and singer

- Occupations: Actor; model; singer
- Years active: 2000–present
- Height: 1.74 m (5 ft 9 in)
- Partner: Cintia Rosa
- Relatives: Phellipe Haagensen (brother)

Jonathan Haagensen is a Brazilian actor, model, and singer.

== Life and career ==
A resident of the Vidigal community since birth, Haagensen has Norwegian ancestry from his father, whom he has not seen since he was six years old. "I never knew anything about my father. I only know that he lives in Vitória, the capital city of the state of Espírito Santo," he has said.

He appeared in the film City of God, directed by Fernando Meireles and Kátia Lund, alongside his brother, Phellipe Haagensen, who is also an actor. Haagensen was discovered in Vidigal's theatrical company Nós do Morro.

In addition to acting, he has worked as a model, participating in the Fashion Rio event, campaigning for Dolce & Gabbana, and working in promotional events for the NBA. He also took part in the reality show A Fazenda, broadcast by TV Record.

His television roles include portraying Dodo in Da Cor do Pecado and Cláudio in Paraíso Tropical. He is also member of the hip hop music group Melanina Carioca composed of members of "Nós do Morro".

== Filmography (partial) ==
The director's name is listed in parentheses.

- 2000 - Palace II - Short - (Fernando Meirelles and Kátia Lund)
- 2002 - City of God (Cidade de Deus) - (Fernando Meirelles and Kátia Lund)
- 2002 - Seja o que Deus Quiser - (Murilo Salles)
- 2004 - Four for None (O Diabo a Quatro) - (Alice de Andrade)
- 2002/05 - City of Men (Cidade dos Homens) - TV series - (Fernando Meirelles, Kátia Lund, Paulo Morelli, Cao Hamburger and others)
- 2006 - The Samba Poet (Noel - Poeta da Vila) - (Ricardo Van Steen)
- 2007 - City of Men (Cidade dos Homens) - (Paulo Morelli)
- 2008 - Embarque Imediato - (Allan Fiterman)
- 2018 - O Mecanismo - (José Padilha)
- 2020 - Omniscient
- 2023 - Vai na Fé - (Orfeu Caruso)

== Discography ==
- Melanina Carioca (Haagensen is part of the hip hop group, including actors Marcello Melo Jr. and Roberta Rodrigues.)
