= Phellipe Haagensen =

Brazilian actor (born 1984)

Phellipe Haagensen Cerqueira (born 26 June 1984 in Rio de Janeiro, Brazil) is a Brazilian actor best known for his role of Bené in the 2002 film, City of God (Cidade de Deus). He is the younger brother of model and actor Jonathan Haagensen. He is a member of the band Guerreiros de Jorge.

== Credits ==
- Cidade de Deus (City of God) – 2002
- Sonhos de Peixe
- Cidade dos Homens (City of Men)
- Vidas Opostas (Opposite Lives)
- Mancora – 2008
