= The Year My Parents Went on Vacation =

2006 film by Cao Hamburger

- Theatrical release poster
- Portuguese: O Ano em Que Meus Pais Saíram de Férias
- Directed by: Cao Hamburger
- Written by: Claudio Galperin; Bráulio Mantovani; Anna Muylaert; Cao Hamburger; Adriana Falcão
- Produced by: Caio Gullane; Cao Hamburger; Fabiano Gullane; Sonia Hamburger; Fernando Meirelles; Daniel Filho
- Starring: Germano Haiut; Simone Spoladore; Caio Blat; Eduardo Moreira; Liliana Castro; Rodrigo dos Santos; Michel Joelsas; Daniela Piepszyk; Paulo Autran
- Cinematography: Adriano Goldman
- Edited by: Daniel Rezende
- Music by: Beto Villares
- Production companies: Gullane Filmes; Caos Produções; Miravista; Globo Filmes; Lereby; Teleimage; Locall
- Distributed by: Buena Vista International
- Release dates: 26 September 2006 (Festival do Rio); 2 November 2006 (Brazil)
- Running time: 103 minutes
- Country: Brazil
- Languages: Portuguese; Yiddish
- Budget: R$441,000

The Year My Parents Went on Vacation (Portuguese: O Ano em Que Meus Pais Saíram de Férias) is a 2006 Brazilian drama film directed by Cao Hamburger. The screenplay, which took four years to be completed, was written by Hamburger, Adriana Falcão, Claudio Galperin, Anna Muylaert and Bráulio Mantovani. It won 36 awards in 18 film festivals where it competed.

It was submitted by the Ministry of Culture for the 2007 Academy Award for Best Foreign Language Film, but was not one of the finalists. For some, this choice was unexpected, since it was thought that José Padilha's Elite Squad would be submitted, with there being some supposition that the criticism of Elite Squad appearing to be in favor of using violence to end trafficking and accusations of promoting fascism contributed to the decision to nominate The Year... instead.

Michel Joelsas, who plays Mauro, received a nomination in the 2007 Young Artist Awards for Leading Young Performer.

In 2015, the Brazilian Film Critics Association aka Abraccine voted O Ano... the 98th greatest Brazilian film of all time, in its list of the 100 best Brazilian films.

== Plot ==
The story takes place entirely during a few months in 1970, in the city of São Paulo. Mauro, a 12-year-old boy, is suddenly deprived of the company of his young parents, Bia and Daniel Stein, who are political activists on the run from the harsh military government, which was strongly repressing leftists all over the country. Against this backdrop of fear and political persecution, the country is at the same time bursting with enthusiasm for the upcoming World Cup, to be held in Mexico, the first one to be transmitted live via satellite.

Unable to take care of their only child, the Steins, who live in Belo Horizonte, drive all the way to São Paulo to deliver the boy to his paternal grandfather, Mótel, who is a barber. To their son, they say they will travel on vacation and promise to return for the World Cup games. However, the grandfather dies on the same day the boy arrives, and he is left clueless and without support in Bom Retiro, a working-class neighborhood inhabited mainly by Jews, many of whom speak Yiddish, an unknown language to the boy. As his father is Jewish, the close-knit Bom Retiro community rally in support of the child and Shlomo, a solitary elder and religious Jew who was a close neighbor and friend of Mauro's grandfather, assumes the care of Mauro.

Mauro is a football enthusiast and wants to be a goalkeeper. He gradually mixes in with other neighborhood children and becomes acquainted with a number of colorful characters, including Hanna, a girl his age; Ítalo, a politically active student from the Pontifical Catholic University of São Paulo; Irene, a beautiful female bartender and her boyfriend, the mulatto ace goalkeeper of one of the local football teams; the local rabbi and assorted Jewish elders, Italian immigrants, and so on.

To Mauro's great disappointment, his parents neither appear as promised at the World Cup nor give any notice. Fearing the worst, Shlomo starts to investigate by himself and is arrested by the political police because of his meddling. Finally, he achieves the release of Mauro's mother, who is severely ill after the prison term. Her reunion with her child happens on the very same day as Brazil's final victory at the World Cup. (Mauro's father disappears while in the dictatorship's clutches, never to return.) At the end of the film, Mauro says farewell to his recent friends and playmates as he and his mother leave Bom Retiro and prepare to go into exile.

== Cast ==
- Michel Joelsas as Mauro
- Germano Haiut as Shlomo
- Daniela Piepszyk as Hanna
- Caio Blat as Ítalo
- Liliana Castro as Irene
- Paulo Autran as Mótel, Mauro's grandfather
- Simone Spoladore as Bia, Mauro's mother
- Eduardo Moreira as Daniel, Mauro's father
- Rodrigo dos Santos as Edgar
- Felipe Hanna Braun as Caco
- Gabriel Eric Bursztein as Bóris
- Abrahão Farc as Anatol
- Kaim Fridman as Duda
- Edu Guimarães as Alfredo
- Hugueta Sendacz as Dona Eidel

== Production ==
Originally, the film was approved for production funding from the Brazilian government under the title My Life as a Goalkeeper (Portuguese: Minha Vida de Goleiro), but the title was changed due to concerns that female audiences would be less inclined to watch it with soccer so prominent in the title. The name change was approved on 1 November 2006, with funding approved through 31 December 2006. The Year... was approved to receive R$441,000 for production, and received an additional R$150,000 for its campaign to win the Oscar. Gullane Filmes and Caos Produções, in association with Disney's Latin American Miravista studio produced the film.

The Year... was filmed on location in Bom Retiro, with a majority of the film's cast not being professional actors. Hamburger stated that over 1,200 children auditioned for the role of Mauro before he chose Joelsas. About seventy percent of the auditions for the children's roles were held in the Jewish community, at schools and clubs.

It has also been considered a partially auto-biographical film in that Ernst Hamburger and Amélia Hamburger (pt), Cao Hamburger's parents, were both arrested during Médici's dictatorship for hiding activists.

Speaking with Comunicação & Educação, Hamburger stated that the soundtrack was incorporated as part of the narrative intentionally. In the program for the 2007 Berlinale, Hamburger is quoted as stating that his intent was to examine the mythos surrounding the 1970 Brazilian team as well as to attempt to dispel prejudices that Brazil is limited to "Indios, the jungle and the favelas." In the official script release, the introduction from Hamburger notes the process the script went through, including a year hiatus while he was working on a project with HBO. He also states that the script underwent a partial rewrite after filming had begun. In an interview in 2008, Hamburger stated that he intended to capture the concepts of both time and space in the film, a concept he attributed to inspiration from Wim Wenders.

== Release ==
The film debuted in Brazil to an audience of 70,000 on 26 September 2006. It reportedly opened to a "modest" box office. The official tabulation from the Agência Nacional do Cinema on a report for films produced from 1995 to 2011 showed a public audience count of 368,986 with a box office of R$3,169,763.

After playing at Berlinale, The Year... was released in nearly 30 countries at film festivals, such as the 22nd Guadalajara International Film Festival, which opened with a screening of The Year....

At Cannes in 2006, RB Cinema 1 announced it would invest in three films from Latin America, including The Year..., covering nine percent of equity. The firm then took charge of selling distribution rights, such as to Vértigo Films in Spain and to Indie Circle, which covered France, Italy, Switzerland, Belgium, and the Netherlands.

City Lights Pictures obtained the distribution rights for the film in the United States in July 2007. It played at various theaters in the U.S. throughout January and February 2008. The official theater release date for the United States was 15 February 2008. In its first two weekends, the film played on 22 screens and earned a total of US$174,423. According to The Numbers, the film grossed US$804,047 with 22 weeks in theaters.

Worldwide, the film grossed US$2,607,117.

The Year... was released on DVD in the U.S. on 15 July 2008, with distribution through City Lights Home Entertainment.

== Reception ==
=== Critical response ===
Reception for the film was mixed, though Brazilian reviewers tended to be more positive. Critics from publications in the United States tended to be the most negative in their appraisal of the film.

=== Brazil ===
Marcelo Hessel, writing for Omelete, mentioned that the press release for The Year... did note inspiration from Kamchatka as well as directors Steven Spielberg and Sergio Leone. Hessel praised Hamburger for contrasting the innocence of childhood with the insecurity inherent in periods of political unrest without verbalizing it. Eduardo Valente, writing for Revista Cinética, praised the film for its handling of the social and political turmoil of 1970s Brazil without being heavy-handed in its execution, focusing on the characters rather than the environment. Valente made a point of noting that the political characters, Mauro's parents, only appear at the beginning and end of the film, which Valente said strengthened the coming-of-age narrative. Wander Cabral, reviewing for Cineplayers, rated the film eight out of ten stars, also pointing out that the film's focus is on Mauro's reactions to the turmoil - how it affects his childhood and innocence - rather than on the political turmoil that is a frequent setting in Brazilian historical films. Cabral also praises the technical aspects of the film, specifically mentioning the cinematography and music, and how they are utilized to express Mauro's emotions. Though Cabral did mention that the film could have been more melodramatic and emotional, he felt that such trappings weren't its purpose.

Ailton Monteiro, writing for ScoreTrack, gave the film four out of four stars and mentioned how Hamburger captured the mixed feelings that come with winning the World Cup among the political discord that permeated Brazil in 1970. Marcelo Sobrinho for Plano Crítico points out that the film doesn't spend time in either debauchery or denouncing the regime; rather it is focused on Brazil's melancholy. Sobrinho praises Goldman's cinematography for visually capturing that emotion. Yara Fernandes, writing for Opinião Socialista, stated that while showing the perils of a dictatorship and political turmoil in Latin America from a child's perspective wasn't a new concept, contrasting that familiar narrative with the atmosphere in Brazil surrounding the 1970 World Cup created "a great national film" that also explained how Médici's regime exploited the Brazilian love of football as a cover for repression.

Thomas Boeira, writing for Papo de Cinema (pt), stated the choice to view the political turmoil of 1970 from a child's perspective is what made the film so interesting. Boeira does, however, note that there are some issues within the film, such as Schlomo and Mauro's relationship development, which he calls "predictable", and moments which he stated at times felt more like watching a serial's narrative. Luiz Joaquim of Cinema Escrito praised the film for its "simple (but not simplistic) narrative", as well as saying that the film cemented Hamburger's reputation as a director. Joaquim's review emphasized that the human element in the film set it apart from other contemporary Latin American productions that sought to use the same perspective of a child's naiveté as a lens. Rubens Ewald Filho, writing for Universo Online when the film was released on DVD, pointed out that while the film does depict the story of an outsider forced into a new culture, it neither relies on the sentimentality of acceptance into that new environment nor does it make light of the cultural dissonance Mauro experiences. (Note: Filho was one of the critics on the panel that chose which film would be sent to the 2007 Academy Awards, and admitted that the selection of The Year... "was not for the best film of the year" but rather the one that fell most in line with what the jury at the Academy Awards would be likely to award the Oscar to.)

Roberta Pennafort, writing for Veja, found the film to be "weak" and stated that it was made for children rather than adults. In a harsh criticism against the selection panel, Pennafort stated that they chose a film more likely to succeed in the Oscars than to represent Brazil and its culture. Pennafort commented that the decision to choose The Year... as the submission for the 2007 Academy Awards indicated that the jury was making the statement that Brazilian culture shouldn't be treated as "adult", going on to state that perhaps audiences should expect to be treated as infants when consuming Brazilian media. Pennafort also stated that the film is very much like Hamburger's television show Castelo Rá-Tim-Bum with very little change and that the film was reminiscent of Disney's Bambi.

=== Canada ===
Maureen Curry of the Vernon Film Society, writing for The Vernon Morning Star, described Joelsas' and Haiut's performances as "touching", and stated that the film focuses on the religious and generational differences between the characters more than the political backdrop. Philip Marchand writing for the Toronto Star gave the film three out of four stars, and praised Hamburger's handling of the developing relationship between Mauro and Schlomo for not being heavy-handed. Marchand also commented that some of the similes used to describe Mauro aren't carried through and notes that Hamburger is anything but subtle in his use of soccer as a unifying force in 1970 Brazil. Greg Ursic, writing for Westender, stated that Hamburger employed a deliberate pacing in the film, focusing on positivity and unifying force of "the nationalist spirit" even while showing how Médici exploited the Brazilian love of soccer to distract the public from the jailing of his political opponents.

John Griffin of the Montreal Gazette gave the film four out of five stars, also focusing on the ability of soccer to unify the Brazilian people. Griffin praised the performances of Joselas and Piepszyk alongside the cinematography and score. Katherine Monk, syndicated by the Canwest News Service, described the film as "politically correct" and stated that Daniel is more interested in revolution than in "watching sports on television". Monk did comment on Hamburger's use of Mauro's gradual acceptance into his new environment as a vehicle to incrementally move the focus of the film to the broader picture of Brazil's political turmoil. Monk also stated that while some of the film is well developed, she found that several parts of the story were not. Monk's rating was recorded as both a B minus and three out of four stars. National Post's Chris Knight gave the film three out of four stars and called it a "charmer", adding that Hamburger's choice to leave Mauro without all of the answers he craves throughout the film is a wise decision given that "attaining wisdom takes even longer than winning the World Cup."

=== United States ===
The Year My Parents Went on Vacation has an approval rating of 81% on review aggregator website Rotten Tomatoes, based on 54 reviews, and an average rating of 7/10. The website's critical consensus states: "Hamburger deftly refracts the sociopolitical tumult of early '70s Brazil through the lens of a young boy's coming of age, and Joelsas' performance is wise beyond his years". Metacritic assigned the film a weighted average score of 67 out of 100, based on 19 critics, indicating "generally favorable reviews".

After its showing in Berlin in 2007, Deborah Young of Variety hailed the film as "sensitive, delicate and involving", going on to say that "Hamburger feels no need (nor is there any) to underline the obvious. He has a magician's ability to keep the story light and believable". It also notes that "the humorous central part of the screenplay is bereft of surprises". Kirk Honeycutt, syndicated by the Associated Press, also reviewed the film after its debut at Berlinale, praising it for its subtlety and for not relying on a sense of nostalgia to make its points. Honeycutt commented that the cinematography brought out the details of the set production, and that the music was not intrusive.

Marta Barber of the Miami Herald rated the film two-and-a-half out of four stars and praised Daniela Piepszyk's performance. A. O. Scott, writing for the New York Times stated that though the setting of the film would be novel for many viewers, the emotions were "disappointingly familiar" and found the story to be commonplace. Nick Schager of Slant Magazine found the film to be just another in a long line of coming-of-age stories set in a period of political dissent. While Schager found the film "predictable", he did praise Hamburger for his "understatement" while lamenting that he found the story itself unremarkable. Jeffrey Anderson of Combustible Celluloid also commented on how similar the story is to other films of the same genre, specifically comparing it to My Life as a Dog and Cinema Paradiso and saying that the film "has little to do with any actual human experience and everything with re-creating experiences from other movies."

Fernando Croce, a film critic for Slant Magazine but writing for the website CinePassion, found the film lacking, describing it as "painless". Croce referred to is as a "brand x" film and unfavorably compared Hamburger to Marjane Satrapi. Wesley Morris of The Boston Globe found the film lacking, stating that Hamburger limited himself to the scope of the 1970 World Cup despite demonstrating his understanding of a child's psyche and "some of the finer points of childhood". Morris called it "underbearing", arguing that Mauro is sheltered throughout and not allowed to grasp the larger issues.

Jean Westmore, writing for The Buffalo News, gave the film three out of four stars, stated that Hamburger's previous work in children's television gave the neighborhood scenes a more realistic quality and found the use of Mauro's innocence as a lens through which to show the government's actions "interesting". Lawrence Toppman of The Charlotte Observer gave the film three out of four stars, pointing out that Hamburger uses the constant presence of the police without openly revealing their intentions to create a vague sense of danger. Toppman also noted that the film includes a theme of girls being just as noteworthy as boys, stating that this is atypical of Brazilian men. John Beifuss, writing for The Commercial Appeal, found the film to be an accurate depiction of the loneliness an adolescent can feel, and noted that the way the tension of political strife builds before Mauro becomes fully cognizant of it allows the viewer to keenly experience his loss of innocence.

=== Awards and nominations ===
==== 2008 ====
The film won Best Fiction Feature Film, Best Art Direction (Cassio Amarante), and Best Adapted Screenplay at the 2007/2008 Academia Brasileira de Cinema (pt) Awards. The Year... was also nominated for Best Picture at the 48th Festival Internacional de Cine y TV de Cartagena, or FICCI, in 2008. The Year... won the Special Critics Award; Best Picture was awarded to Maldeamores.

==== 2007 ====
The film was picked as Brazil's submission for the 2007 Academy Award for Best Foreign Language Film (and was shortlisted alongside nine other films), but it was not included among the finalists. It was also nominated in the 29th Young Artist Awards for Best International Feature Film and Best Performance in an International Feature Film – Leading Young Performer (Michel Joelsas).

At the 33rd Huelva Ibero-American Film Festival, The Year... received the Special Jury Award. The Year... was among twenty-two films nominated for the Golden Bear at the 57th Berlin International Film Festival, though the prize that year went to Tuya's Marriage. The Year... was also the official selection for the 2007 Tribeca Film Festival.

At the 2007 FIESP/SESI-SP Awards, The Year... received Best Film, Best Director (Cao Hamburger), Best Supporting Actress (Daniela Piepszyk), Best Supporting Actor (Germano Haiut), and Best Art Direction (Cassio Amarante). The Year... won in all four of the categories where it was a finalist in the 2007 Associação Brasileira de Cinematografia (ABC) Awards: Feature Film Cinematography (Adriano Goldman), Feature Film Art Direction (Cassio Amarante), Feature Film Sound (Romeu Quinto, Alessandro Laroca, Armando Torres Jr), and Feature Film Editing (Daniel Rezende). In the Oslo Films From the South Festival in 2007, the film won the Audience Award. At the 11th Lima Latin American Film Festival, it won the Jury Award for Best Screenplay.

The Year... tied with Zuzu Angel for the second highest number of nominations at the 2007 Guarani de Cinema Brasileiro Awards (pt), with both in competition for eleven awards. The Year... won Best Direction, Best Original Screenplay, and received the Popular Jury award. In the 2007 Prêmio ACIE de Cinema, The Year... won for Best Film and Best Screenplay, as well as the Popular Jury Award; it had also been nominated in the Best Director, Best Actor (for Michel Joelsas), and Best Cinematography categories. The Year... also won the Grand Coral second prize at the 29th Havana Film Festival in December 2007, as well as Best Score (Beto Villares), and the Cybervote Award for Best First Fiction Work.

In the second Prêmio Contigo! de Cinema Nacional (pt), The Year... was nominated for Best Film, Best Director, Best Actor (Michel Joelsas), Best Supporting Actor (Germano Haiut), Best Supporting Actress (Daniela Piepszyk), and Best Screenplay. It won Best Film, Best Director, and Best Screenplay. At the third CinePort (pt), it was nominated for Best Film, Best Screenplay, and Best Art Direction. It won Best Art Direction (Cassio Amarante). At the ninth Santo Domingo International Film Festival, The Year... won the Golden Ciguapa for Best Film as well as Best Director, Best Score (Beto Villares), and the Audience Award. At the eighth Monterrey International Film Festival (es), The Year... won the Special Jury Award for Best Cinematography.

The Year... was nominated for Best Film at the 16th Festival de Biarritz Amérique Latine in 2007; the award ultimately went to Postcards from Leningrad. It was nominated in the 2007 Prêmio Arte Qualidade Brasil (pt) for Best Film, Best Director, Best Actor (Germano Haiut), Best Supporting Actor (Caio Blat), Best Supporting Actress (twice: once for Simone Spoladore, once for Liliana Castro), Best New Actor (Michel Joelsas); each of those categories was won by Elite Squad.

==== 2006 ====
The Year... shared the Petrobrás Cultural de Difusão award for Best Fiction Feature Film with Antônia at the São Paulo International Film Festival in 2006. It also won the Best Fiction Feature, Brazil award at the 2006 Rio de Janeiro International Film Festival, and Best Screenplay at the 2006 Associação Paulista de Críticos de Arte Awards.

== Other acknowledgements ==
The Year... was included as required viewing at the University of Oregon as a part of the elective course "Soccer and Society in Modern Latin America" offered for the BA in Latin American studies in 2014, and was still a part of the course in 2022.

== See also ==
- List of submissions to the 80th Academy Awards for Best Foreign Language Film
- List of Brazilian submissions for the Academy Award for Best Foreign Language Film
