= Douglas Silva =

Brazilian actor and singer (born 1988)

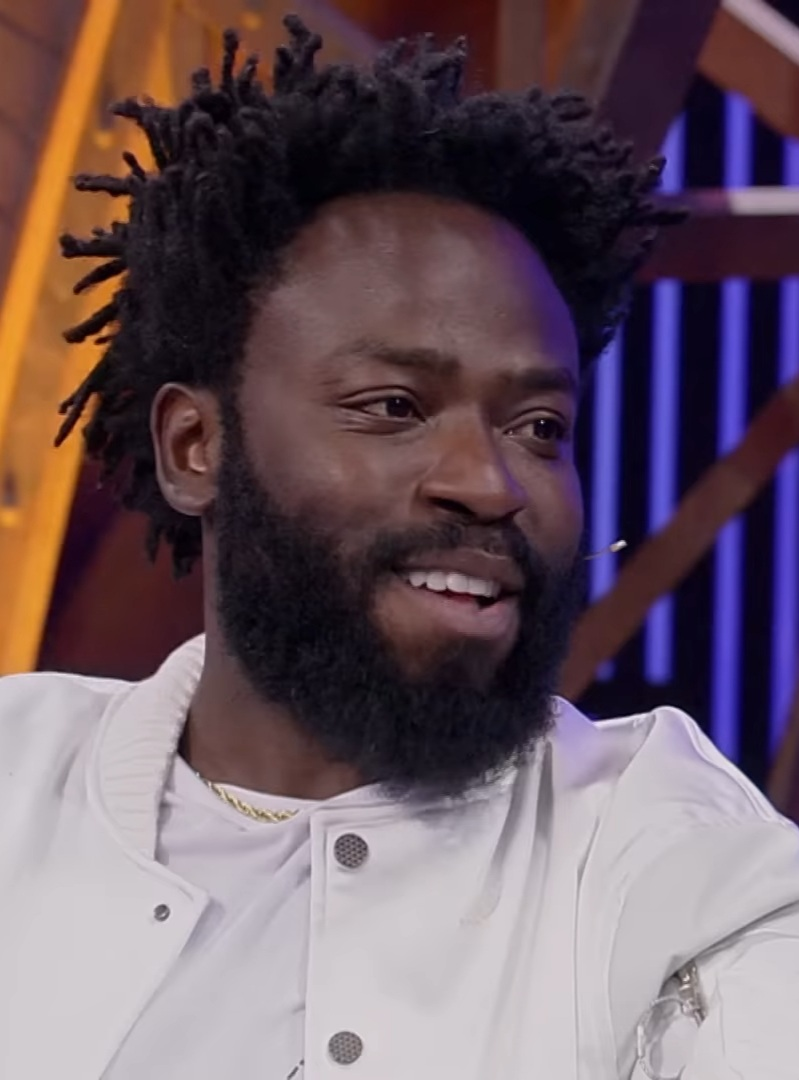
- Silva in 2022, during an interview with the Lady Night program
- Born: 27 September 1988 (age 37); Rio de Janeiro, Brazil
- Occupation: Actor
- Years active: 2000–present
- Spouse: Carolina Brito (m. 2008)
- Children: 2

Douglas Silva (born 27 September 1988), or simply DG, is a Brazilian actor and singer who won the Best Actor award at the Havana Festival. He is best known for his role as Dadinho (also known as Li'l Dice) in the 2002 Brazilian film City of God. Silva also portrayed Acerola in the spin-off television series City of Men and its 2007 film adaptation.

He made his acting debut playing Dadinho in the epic action film City of God (2002), for which he was nominated for the Grande Otelo for Best Supporting Actor at the age of 15 and won the best actor award at the Havana International Festival. It has also received nominations for a Grande Otelo, a Guarani Award and an International Emmy.

Between 2002 and 2005 he acted as Acerola in the series Cidade dos Homens, on TV Globo. His character was successful and for his performance he became the first Brazilian actor to receive an International Emmy nomination for Best Actor. A film of the same name (2007) was also derived from the series. Twelve years later, he revived the character with the release of the fifth and sixth seasons of the series, in 2017 and 2018, respectively.

== Career ==
He became famous for playing the childhood of the criminal Dadinho in the Oscar-nominated film City of God, in 2004. He also gained notoriety for playing Acerola in the series Cidade dos Homens, on TV Globo. He became the first Brazilian actor to be nominated for an International Emmy.

He was part of the band Soul Mais Samba, where he worked as a vocalist.

On January 14, 2022, Douglas was confirmed as one of the 20 participants in the twenty-second season of the reality show Big Brother Brasil, on TV Globo. He finished the program in third place.

== Personal life ==
He married on 7 November 2008 with Carolina Brito at a party house in Jacarepaguá. The same day Carolina was celebrating her birthday. They have two children: Maria Flor, and Morena.

== Filmography ==
=== Television ===
Year	Title	Role	Notes
2001	Brava Gente	Luís Cláudio Cunha "Acerola"	Episode: "Palace II"
2002	O Natal no Sítio do Picapau Amarelo	Zé	End of Year Special
2002–2005	Cidade dos Homens	Luís Cláudio Cunha "Acerola"	
2005	Casseta e Planeta, Urgente!	Luís Cláudio Cunha "Acerola"	Episode: "October 11th"
2007	Toma Lá, Dá Cá	Préa	Episode: "O Y do Problema"
2007	Carga Pesada	Cid	Episode: "Dupla Ação"
2008–2009	Chamas da Vida	Janjão	
2009	Caminho das Índias	Juliano Goulart	
2010–2011	Os Gozadores	Guiga	
2011–2013	Aventuras do Didi	Dodô	
2010	Papai Noel Existe	Jalmir	End Of Year Special
2011–2017	Esquenta!	Comentarist	
2012–2013	Acampamento de Férias	Estevão / Bené	
2017	Malasartes	Baco	
2017–2018	Cidade dos Homens	Luís Cláudio Cunha "Acerola"	
2018	Carcereiros	Capivara	Episode: "Um Preso Comum"
2018–2019	Samantha!	Douglas Matias "Dodói"	
2019–2021	Amor de Mãe	Marconi Eduardo Silva	
2022	Big Brother Brasil	Participant	Season 22 (3rd place)
2022	Sob Pressão	Josué	Episode: "4"
2022–2023	Todas as Flores	Oberdan Nascimento Paixão	
2023	Dança dos Famosos	Participant	Season 20 (7th place)
2023	Anderson Spider Silva	Max Freitas	
2023	How To Be a Carioca	Luiz Henrique	
2023–2024	Fuzuê	Cláudio Gomes de Braga e Silva	
2023–2024	Show da Virada	Presenter	
2024	Encantado's	DG	Episode: "Um Presente pro Ator"
2025	BBB: O Documentário	Himself	
2025	The Masked Singer Brasil	Candinho (from Êta Mundo Bom!)	Season 5

=== Film ===
Year	Title	Role	Notes
2002	City of God	Child Dadinho	
2007	City of Men	Acerola	
2008	Blindness	Pedestrian	
2008	Last Stop 174	Patola	
2010	The Best Things in the World	Gabriel	
2012	City of God – 10 Years Later	Himself	
2017	Malasartes e o Duelo com a Morte	Baco	
2023	Transformers: Rise of the Beasts	Mirage	Brazilian Dubbing
2026	O Gênio do Crime	Caíque	

== Awards and nominations ==
Year	Award	Category	Work	Results
2002	Havana Film Festival	Best Actor	City of God	Won
2003	Grande Prêmio do Cinema Brasileiro	Best Supporting Actor	City of God	Nominated
2005	International Emmy Awards	Best Actor	City of Men	Nominated
