= Paulo Lins =

Brazilian author (born 1958)

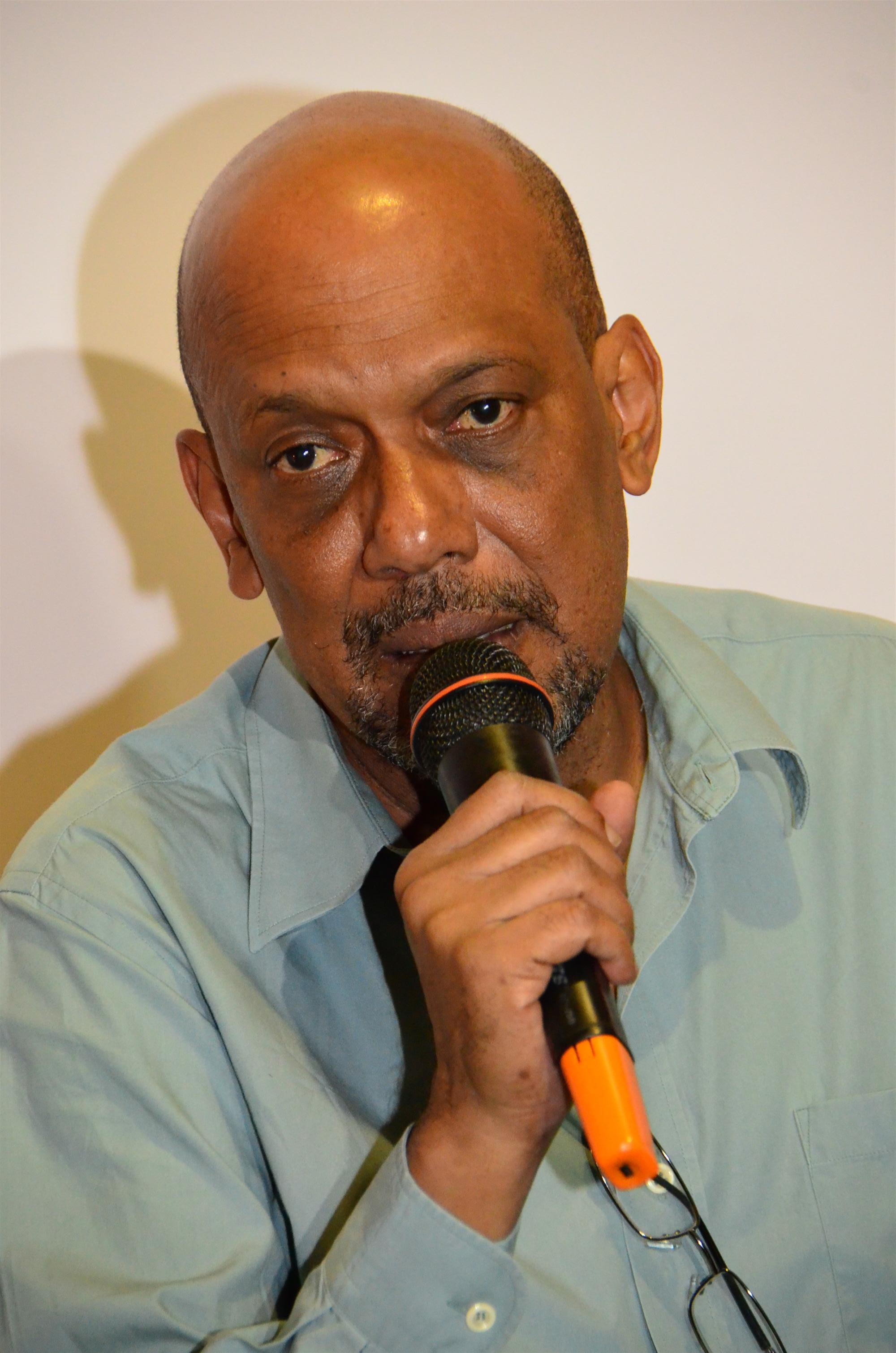
- Lins in 2014
- Born: 11 January 1958 (age 68); Rio de Janeiro, Brazil
- Occupation: Author

Paulo Lins (born January 11, 1958, Rio de Janeiro) is a Brazilian author.

Lins grew up in Rio de Janeiro, and moved to the City of God favela at the age of seven. His parents came from the impoverished northeastern region of Brazil. He later said "Brazil is a racist country and a racist society, but the funny thing is that nobody will admit to being a racist, and that's the problem. Blacks in Brazil are always in an inferior, subaltern position, but you can't find a white person who is a racist."

His literacy and verbal skill enabled Lins to begin writing sambas and contributing to local culture, which enabled him to escape the cycle of gang violence in the favela and become a writer. His 1997 novel City of God was adapted into the 2002 film of the same name.
