= Cidade de Deus, Rio de Janeiro =

Neighborhood in Rio de Janeiro, Brazil

Cidade de Deus
- Neighborhood
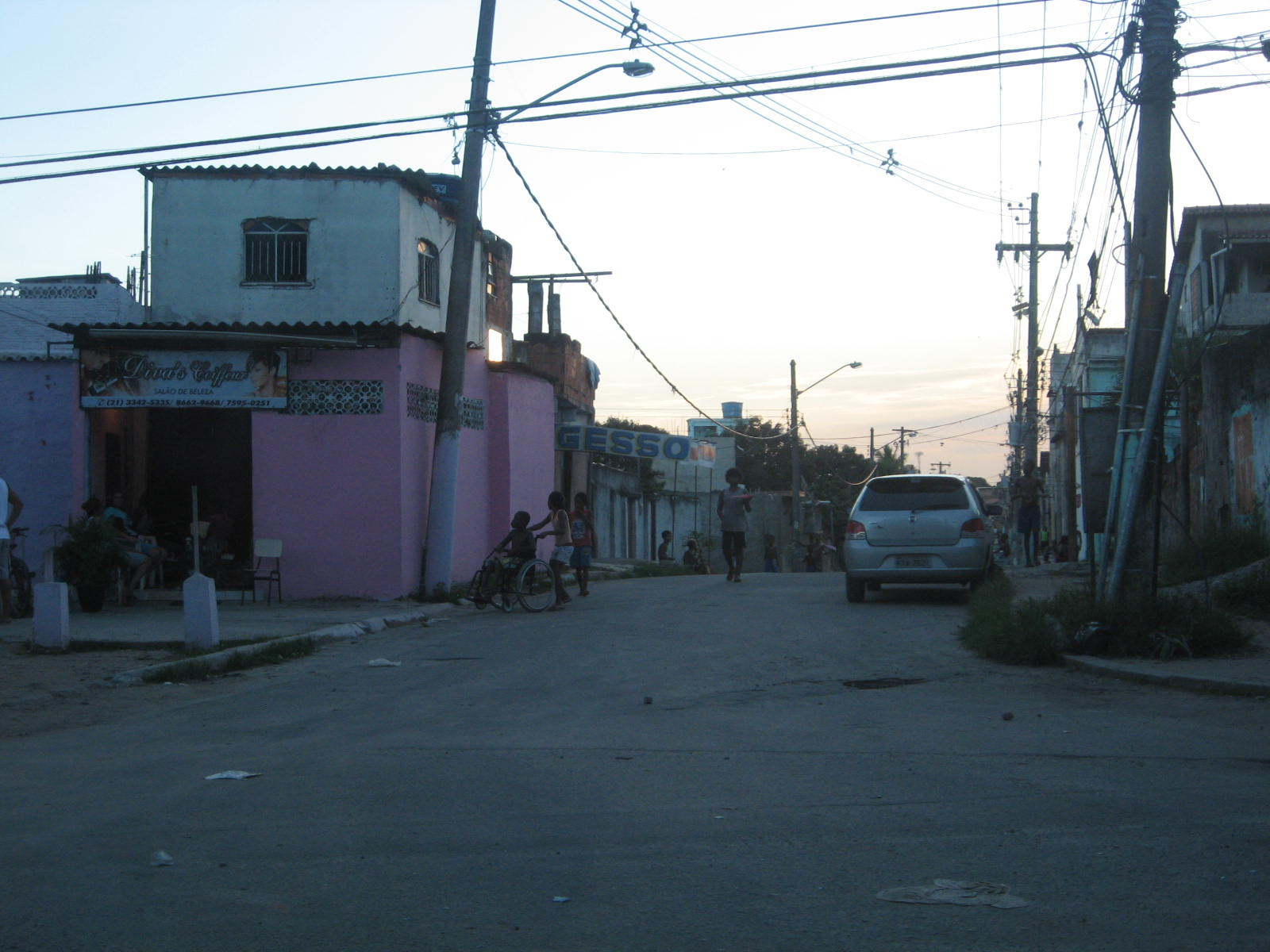
- The favela of Cidade de Deus

- Location in Rio de Janeiro Cidade de Deus (Brazil)
- Coordinates: 22°56′53″S 43°21′47″W
- Country: Brazil
- State: Rio de Janeiro
- Municipality/city: Rio de Janeiro
- Zone: Southwest Zone

Area
  - Total: 1.2058 km^{2} (0.4656 sq mi)

Population
  - Total: 38,016
  - Density: 31,528/km^{2} (81,656/sq mi)

The Cidade de Deus (Portuguese pronunciation: [siˈdadʒi dʒi ˈdews]; lit. 'City of God') is a Southwest Zone neighborhood of the city of Rio de Janeiro. It is also known as CDD among its inhabitants.

The neighborhood was founded in 1960, planned and executed by the government of Guanabara State as part of the policy to systematically remove slums (favelas) from the center of Rio de Janeiro and resettle their inhabitants in the suburbs.

It was used as backdrop in the 2002 film City of God. In 2009, it was occupied by a Pacifying Police Unit.

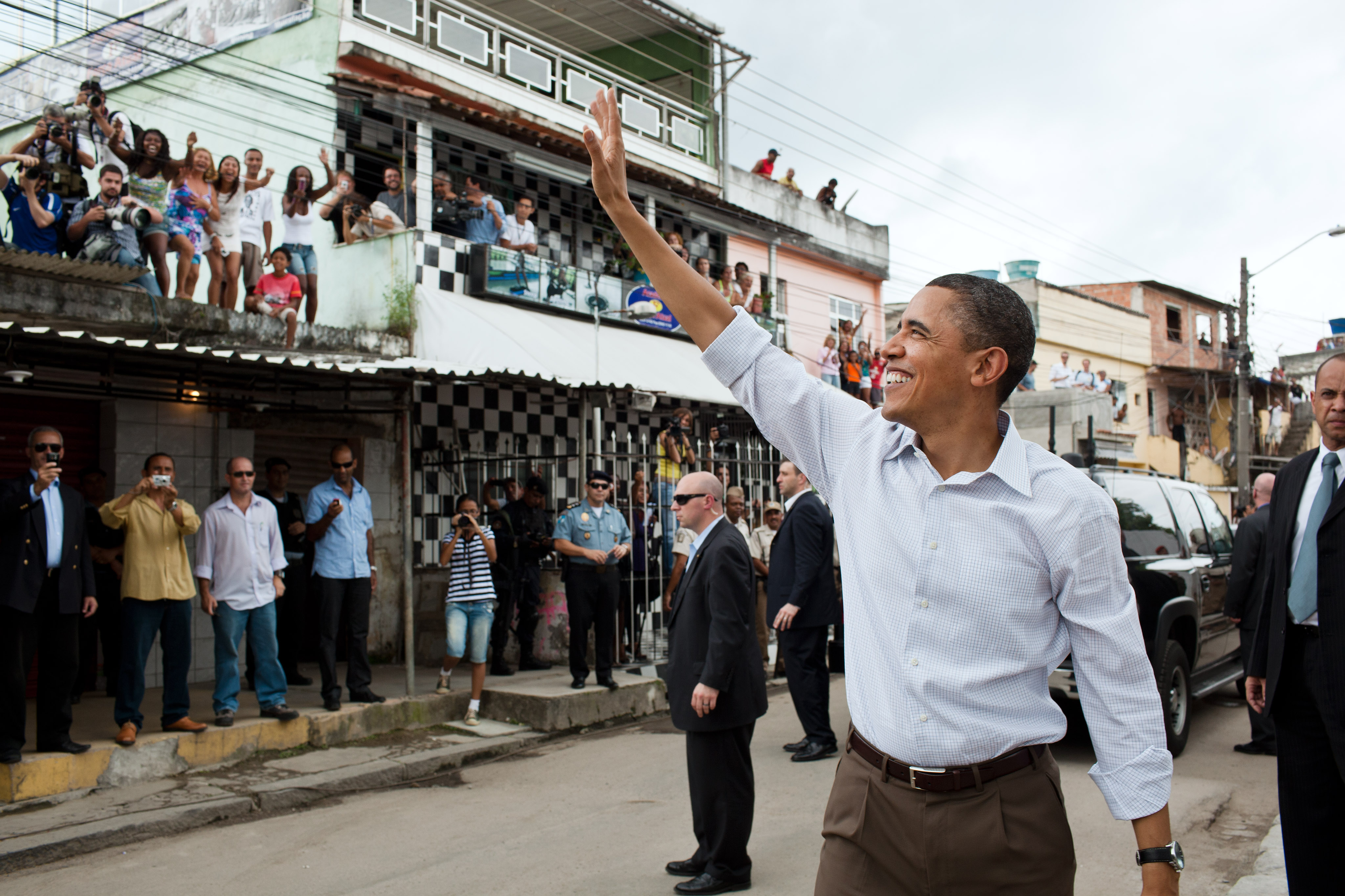
U.S. president Barack Obama visiting Rio's Cidade de Deus (City of God) favela. This favela started out as public housing built on marshy flatlands in the city's Western suburbs

== In literature and film ==
Known in English as City of God, Cidade de Deus is the eponymous name of a 1997 semi-autobiographical novel by Paulo Lins, about three young men and their lives of petty crime during the 1960s, 1970s and 1980s in the favela where Lins grew up. An English translation by Alison Entrekin was published in 2006. The novel was filmed by Fernando Meirelles (director of The Constant Gardener and Blindness) in 2002 under the same title City of God, with most of the cast from real-life favelas and in some cases, from Cidade de Deus itself. After filming, the producers set up help groups promising to help those involved to build more promising futures. In 2004, the film received four Academy Award nominations for cinematography, for director Meirelles, for editing and for adapted screenplay by Mantovani. In 2005, Time chose it as one of the 100 greatest films of all time. The tagline "If you run, the beast catches; if you stay, the beast eats", is analogous to the English aphorism "Damned if you do, damned if you don't".

== Local currency ==
In 2011, a local currency called CDD was created for use exclusively in the Cidade de Deus, to encourage inhabitants to spend more locally, thus boosting the local economy. The currency is subsidized. Its value is indexed to about 20% higher than the national currency, the Brazilian real.

== See also ==
- Jacarepaguá
- Favelas in the city of Rio de Janeiro
- Ballymun Flats
