= Bráulio Mantovani =

Brazilian screenwriter and author (born 1963)

- Born: July 1963 (age 61); São Paulo, Brazil
- Education: Pontifícia Universidade Católica de São Paulo
- Occupation: Screenwriter
- Notable work: City of God

Bráulio Mantovani (born July 1963 in São Paulo) is a Brazilian screenwriter and author.

== Career ==
Graduating in Portuguese Language and Literature from the Pontifícia Universidade Católica de São Paulo, he began his career writing professionally for theatre groups in 1987. Before becoming a writer, Mantovani was an amateur actor working in plays, training he later said was crucial in helping writing characters. In the early 1990s, he moved to New York City where he worked as camera operator and assistant director for Zbigniew Rybczyński.

Back in Brazil, he wrote the script for the short film Palace II, directed by Fernando Meirelles in 2001. During the next year, the partnership extended to City of God, which earned him an Academy Award nomination for Best Adapted Screenplay.

He also wrote the play "Menecma" and the book "Perácio - Relato Psicótico".

== Awards and Recognitions ==
- 2003 Academy Awards — Nominated for Best Adapted Screenplay for City of God
- 2011 São Paulo Prize for Literature — Shortlisted in the Best Book of the Year - Debut Author category for Perácio - Relato Psicótico

== Filmography ==
- Cidade de Deus (2002)
- Palace II (2002)
- Cidade dos Homens (2003) (TV series)
- Nanoilusão (2005)
- O Ano em Que Meus Pais Saíram de Férias (2006)
- Tropa de Elite (2007)
- Linha de Passe (2008)
- Última Parada 174 (2008)
- Tropa de Elite 2 (2010)
