= City of God (Lins novel) =

1997 novel written by Paulo Lins

- Author: Paulo Lins
- Original title: Cidade de Deus
- Translator: Alison Entrekin
- Language: Portuguese
- Genre: Crime fiction
- Publisher: Bloomsbury Publishing
- Publication date: 1997
- Publication place: Brazil
- English publication date: 1 May 2006
- Media type: Print (Paperback)
- Pages: 496 pages
- ISBN: 0-7475-7680-7
- OCLC: 63399081

City of God (Portuguese: Cidade de Deus) is a 1997 semi-autobiographical novel by Paulo Lins, about three young men and their lives in Cidade de Deus, a favela in Western Rio de Janeiro where Lins grew up. It is the only novel by Lins to be published and took 8 years to complete.

It was made into a feature film of the same name in 2002, which went on to be nominated for four Oscars. An English translation of the book was published in 2006. Thanks to the international recognition of the film, the book continued to be translated into several more languages, including Italian, French, Spanish and German.

== Title ==
The book is named after the favela in which the novel takes place, Cidade de Deus. Cidade de Deus was established in 1960 in the western zone of Rio de Janeiro as part of a government strategy to systematically move favelas away from the city centre and relocate inhabitants to the suburbs.

== Synopsis ==
City of God is set in a city renowned for its natural beauty. The novel follows the lives of gangsters and petty criminals living in the favela. The novel is set from the 1960s through to the 1980s. In the beginning, delinquents make money through hold-ups. In the 1970s, cocaine arrives and takes its place in the criminals' lives, both dealing and consuming vast amounts. Drug lords use their wealth to buy guns, which give them more power. Conflicts over who controls the drug trade in the favela result in gang wars. Written laws do not apply; power is held by criminals and drug lords who rule the favela. The poorly paid police monitor the gangs, not for the sake of public safety, but to ensure their corrupt income from the gangs.
