= Andrea Barata Ribeiro =

Brazilian film producer

Andrea Barata Ribeiro is a Brazilian film producer. She is best known for producing the Academy Award-nominated 2002 film City of God.

She is a founding partner of O2 Filmes.
