= City of God (2002 film) =

2002 Brazilian epic crime film by Fernando Meirelles and Kátia Lund

- Brazilian theatrical release poster
- Brazilian Portuguese: Cidade de Deus
- Directed by: Fernando Meirelles
- Screenplay by: Bráulio Mantovani
- Based on: City of God by Paulo Lins
- Produced by: Andrea Barata Ribeiro; Maurício Andrade Ramos; Hank Levine
- Starring: Alexandre Rodrigues; Leandro Firmino Da Hora; Jonathan Haagensen; Phellipe Haagensen; Douglas Silva; Daniel Zettel; Seu Jorge
- Cinematography: César Charlone
- Edited by: Daniel Rezende
- Music by: Antônio Pinto; Ed Cortês
- Production companies: O2 Filmes; VideoFilmes; Hank Levine Film; Globo Filmes; Studio Canal; Wild Bunch
- Distributed by: Lumière (Brazil); Mars Distribution (France); Constantin Film (Germany); Miramax Films (United States)
- Release dates: 18 May 2002 (Cannes); 30 August 2002 (Brazil); 17 January 2003 (United States); 12 March 2003 (France); 8 May 2003 (Germany)
- Running time: 130 minutes
- Countries: Brazil; France; Germany; United States
- Language: Portuguese
- Budget: R$10 million ($3.3 million)
- Box office: $30.6 million

City of God (Portuguese: Cidade de Deus) is a 2002 Brazilian epic crime film directed by Fernando Meirelles and co-directed by Kátia Lund. The screenplay, written by Bráulio Mantovani, is adapted from the 1997 novel of the same name by Paulo Lins, though the plot is also loosely based on real events. The film portrays the rise of organized crime in the Cidade de Deus suburb of Rio de Janeiro between the late 1960s and early 1980s, culminating in a war between drug dealer Li'l Zé and vigilante-turned-criminal Knockout Ned. Its tagline is, "If you run, the beast catches you; if you stay, the beast eats you."

The film features a cast including Alexandre Rodrigues, Leandro Firmino, Jonathan and Phellipe Haagensen, Douglas Silva, Daniel Zettel, Seu Jorge, and the film debut of Alice Braga. Most of the actors were actual residents of favelas such as Vidigal and Cidade de Deus itself.

City of God received widespread critical acclaim and earned four nominations at the 76th Academy Awards: Best Cinematography (César Charlone), Best Director (Meirelles), Best Film Editing (Daniel Rezende), and Best Adapted Screenplay (Mantovani). At the previous 75th Academy Awards, it was Brazil's submission for the Academy Award for Best International Feature Film but was not selected as a finalist. In 2015, the Brazilian Film Critics Association (Abraccine) ranked City of God 8th on its list of the 100 greatest Brazilian films.

Following the success of City of God, Meirelles and Lund created the City of Men TV series and its 2007 film adaptation. Both projects share some actors (notably leads Silva and Darlan Cunha) and the same setting as City of God.

== Plot ==
An armed gang chases after an escaped chicken in a favela called the City of God. The chicken stops between the gang and a young man nicknamed Rocket.

In the 1960s, three impoverished, amateur thieves known as the "Tender Trio"—Shaggy, Clipper, and Rocket's older brother, Goose—rob business owners and share the money with the community who, in turn, hide them from the police.

Li'l Dice, a young boy, convinces them to hold up a motel and rob its occupants. The gang resolves not to kill anyone and tells Li'l Dice to be a lookout. Instead, Li'l Dice guns down the motel occupants after falsely warning the trio that the police are coming. The massacre attracts so much police attention that the trio is forced to split up: Clipper joins the Church, Shaggy is shot by the police while trying to escape the favela, and Goose is shot by Li'l Dice after taking his money while Li'l Dice's friend Benny, Shaggy's brother, watches.

In the 1970s, Rocket has joined a group of young hippies. He enjoys photography and likes one girl, Angélica, but his attempt to get close to her is ruined by a gang of petty criminal kids known as "The Runts". Li'l Dice, who now calls himself "Li'l Zé", has established a drug empire with Benny by eliminating all of the competition, except for Carrot, who is a good friend of Benny's. Rocket witnesses Li'l Zé take over 'the apartment', a known drug distribution center, and forces Carrot's underboss Blacky, to work for him instead.

Because of this monopoly, a relative peace comes over the City of God under the reign of Li'l Zé, who manages to avoid police attention by executing petty criminals, including a member of The Runts. Benny decides to branch out of the drug dealer crowd and befriends Tiago, Angélica's ex-boyfriend, who introduces him to his friend group. Benny and Angélica begin dating. Together, they decide to leave the city and the drug trade.

During Benny's farewell party, Zé and Benny get into an argument about Benny leaving; the argument is interrupted by Blacky accidentally killing Benny while trying to shoot Li'l Zé. Benny's death leaves Li'l Zé unchecked. Carrot kills Blacky for endangering his life. Li'l Zé and a group of his soldiers start to make their way to Carrot's hideout to kill him.

On the way, Zé follows a girl who dismissed his advances at Benny's party. He beats up her boyfriend, a peaceful ex-soldier named Knockout Ned, and rapes her. After Ned's brother stabs Li'l Zé, his gang retaliates by shooting into his house, killing his brother and uncle in the process. A gang war breaks out between Carrot and Li'l Zé. A vengeful Ned sides with Carrot, initially trying to stay true to his ideals of only harming criminals, but he quickly loses his morals after having to shoot a policeman during a bank robbery. Tiago also is drawn into the conflict to support his drug addiction, siding with Li'l Zé.

The war is still ongoing a year later, in 1981, the origin forgotten. Both sides enlist more "soldiers" and Li'l Zé gives the Runts weapons. One day, Li'l Zé has Rocket take photos of him and his gang. A reporter publishes the photos, a significant scoop since no outsiders can safely enter the City of God anymore. Rocket believes Li'l Zé will kill him for publishing the photo of him and his gang. The reporter takes Rocket in for the night, and he loses his virginity to her. Unbeknownst to him, Li'l Zé, jealous of Ned's media fame, is pleased with the photos and with his own increased notoriety.

Rocket returns to the city for more photographs. Rocket finds himself caught between Zé's gang and the arriving police, who quickly withdraw when they realize they are outnumbered and outgunned. Rocket is surprised that Zé asks him to take pictures, but as he prepares to take the photo, Carrot's gang arrives. In the ensuing gunfight, Ned kills Tiago but is then killed by a boy who has infiltrated Carrot's gang to avenge his father, the policeman whom Ned shot during the bank robbery. The police capture Li'l Zé and Carrot and plan to show Carrot off to the media. Since Li'l Zé has been bribing the police, they take all of Li'l Zé's money and let him go, but Rocket secretly photographs the scene. The Runts meet with Zé, seeming to want to talk, but tackle him to the floor, mock him, and shoot him dozens of times in the head, back and legs in retaliation for Li'l Zé murdering their friend a year prior to set an example for the Runts previous petty crimes spree. Rocket approaches Zé's mangled body, and takes a final photograph.

Rocket contemplates whether to publish the cops' photo, expose corruption, and become famous, or the picture of Li'l Zé's dead body, which will get him an internship at the newspaper. He decides on the latter, and the Runts walk around the City of God, making a hit list of the dealers they plan to kill to take over the drug business.

== Cast ==
- Alexandre Rodrigues as Rocket – The narrator, who dreams of becoming a photographer. His real name is Wilson Rodrigues.
- Leandro Firmino as Li'l Zé/Li'l Dice – A power-hungry psychopath, who takes sadistic pleasure in killing. "Dado" is a common nickname for Eduardo and means "dice", and "inho" is a diminutive suffix in Portuguese. As an adult, he is given the name Zé Pequeno in a Candomblé ceremony, which may be unrelated to his actual name and more to his short stature. Zé is a nickname for José, while pequeno means "little". Douglas Silva portrays Li'l Dice as a child.
- Phellipe Haagensen as Benny – Zé's longtime partner in crime, he is a friendly City of God drug dealer who fancies himself a sort of Robin Hood and eventually wants to lead an honest life. Michel Gomes portrays Benny as a child.
- Matheus Nachtergaele as Carrot – A drug dealer who is friendly with Benny but is constantly threatened by Zé.
- Seu Jorge as Knockout Ned [pt] – A handsome, charismatic gentleman. As a veteran, he is an excellent shot and can shoot better than most "soldiers". His name was changed from "Mané Galinha" for the English subtitles because in English, "chicken", which "Galinha" translates to, is a term for a coward (in Brazil it denotes womanizing tendencies and popularity among women). "Mané" is a nickname for Manuel, but also denotes an individual not intellectually gifted.
- Jonathan Haagensen as Shaggy – Older brother of Benny and the leader of the Tender Trio ("Trio Ternura"), a group of thieves who share their profits with the population of the City of God.
- Roberta Rodrigues as Berenice – Shaggy's girlfriend, who convinces him to leave the favela and his criminal past.
- Renato de Souza as Goose – One of the Tender Trio, and Rocket's brother. He sleeps with a bartender's wife and gets kicked out by his father when the police arrive, he is killed by Li'l Dice later that day.
- Jefechander Suplino as Clipper – One of the Tender Trio. He later gives up crime to join the Church.
- Edson Oliveira as Stringy – Childhood friend of Rocket. Emerson Gomes portrays Stringy as a child.
- Alice Braga as Angélica – A friend and love interest of Rocket, and later Benny's girlfriend, who motivates Benny to abandon the criminal life.
- Daniel Zettel as Tiago – Angélica's ex-boyfriend, who later becomes Li'l Zé's associate and a drug addict.
- Darlan Cunha as Steak n' Fries – A young boy who joins Zé's gang.
- Rubens Sabino as Blacky – Carrot's manager.
- Charles Paraventi as Charles / Uncle Sam – A weapons dealer who's supplied by the police. After returning from a deal empty-handed, the police kill him.
- Graziella Moretto as Marina Cintra – A journalist for Jornal do Brasil, who hires Rocket as a photographer.
- Luiz Carlos Ribeiro Seixas as Touro – An honest police officer.
- Maurício Marques as Melonhead – A corrupt police officer.
- Thiago Martins as Lampião – Child leader of the Runts gang.
- Marcos Junqueira as Otávio – Child leader of the Runts gang.
- Arlindo Lopes as young man.

== Production ==
City of God was filmed on 16mm film stock.

On the bonus DVD, it is revealed that the only professional actor in the film was Matheus Nachtergaele, who played the supporting role of Carrot. Most of the remaining cast were from real-life favelas, and in some cases, even the real-life City of God favela itself. According to Meirelles, amateur actors were used for two reasons: the lack of available professional black actors, and the desire for authenticity. Meirelles explained: "Today I can open a casting call and have 500 black actors, but just ten years ago this possibility did not exist. In Brazil, there were three or four young black actors and at the same time I felt that actors from the middle class could not make the film. I needed authenticity."

Beginning around 2000, about a hundred children and young people were hand-picked and placed into an "actors' workshop" for several months. In contrast to more traditional methods (e.g. studying theatre and rehearsing), it focused on simulating authentic street war scenes, such as a hold-up, scuffle, and shoot-out. Much came from improvisation, as it was thought better to create an authentic, gritty atmosphere. This way, the inexperienced cast soon learned to move and act naturally. After filming, the crew could not leave the cast to return to their old lives in the favelas. Assistance groups were set up to help those involved in the production to build more promising futures.

Meirelles went into the film with the intention of staying true to the "casual nature" of the violence in the novel by Lins. Critic Jean Oppenheimer wrote on the production of the film saying that: "A second guiding principle was to avoid glamorising the violence" and that "many of the killings are either shown indistinctly or kept out of frame."

Because the real Cidade de Deus favela was in the middle of a conflict, a large majority of the film was shot in Cidade Alta, a different favela within Rio. During the production, slumlords did not allow for the production company to have their own security, so local security guards were hired for the safety of the set.

Lund and Meirelles filmed the short film Golden Gate as a test run while casting for City of God was in the initial stages.

== Music ==
The score to the film composed by Antonio Pinto and Ed Córtes. It was followed by two remix albums. Songs from the film:

- "Alvorada" (Cartola / Carlos Cachaça / Herminio B. Carvalho) – Cartola
- "Azul Da Cor Do Mar" (Tim Maia) – Tim Maia
- "Dance Across the Floor" (Harry Wayne Casey / Ronald Finch) – Jimmy Bo Horne
- "Get Up (I Feel Like Being a) Sex Machine" (James Brown / Bobby Byrd / Ronald R. Lenhoff) – James Brown
- "Hold Back the Water" (Randy Bachman / Robin Bachman / Charles Turner) – Bachman–Turner Overdrive
- "Hot Pants Road" (Charles Bobbit / James Brown / St Clair Jr Pinckney) – The J.B.'s
- "Kung Fu Fighting" (Carl Douglas) – Carl Douglas
- "Magrelinha" (Luiz Melodia) – Luiz Melodia
- "Metamorfose Ambulante" (Raul Seixas) – Raul Seixas
- "Na Rua, Na Chuva, Na Fazenda" (Hyldon) – Hyldon
- "Nem Vem Que Não Tem" (Carlos Imperial) – Wilson Simonal
- "O Caminho Do Bem" (Sérgio / Beto / Paulo) – Tim Maia
- "Preciso Me Encontrar" (Candeia) – Cartola
- "So Very Hard to Go" (Emilio Castillo / Stephen M. Kupka) – Tower of Power

== Reception ==
=== Box office ===
The film was screened out of competition at the 2002 Cannes Film Festival. The film could not be part of the official selection because Walter Salles, one of the executive producers, was in the festival jury. In Brazil, City of God garnered the largest audience for a domestic film in 2002, with over 3.1 million tickets sold, and a gross of R$18.6 million ($10.3 million). The film grossed over $7.5 million in the U.S. and over US$30.5 million worldwide.

=== Critical response ===
On Rotten Tomatoes, City of God has an approval rating of 91% based on reviews from 162 critics, with an average rating of 8.6/10. The website's consensus reads, "City of God offers a shocking and disturbing—but always compelling—look at life in the slums of Rio de Janeiro." On Metacritic, the film holds a score of 79 out of 100 based on 33 critic reviews, indicating "generally favorable" reviews.

Colin Kennedy from Empire awarded the film a full 5 out of 5 stars, comparing it favorably to Goodfellas and writing in his review, "At once a laboratory for cinema technique and a victory for raw heart, this is a snot-nosed, blood-stained masterpiece. If you see even one or two better movies this year, you will be very lucky indeed." In 2008, the magazine chose City of God as the 177th-best film of all time.

Film critic Roger Ebert awarded the film 4 stars out of 4, writing in his review, "City of God churns with furious energy as it plunges into the story of the slum gangs of Rio de Janeiro. Breathtaking and terrifying, urgently involved with its characters, it announces a new director of great gifts and passions: Fernando Meirelles. Remember the name."

Filmmaker Robert Altman stated, "I don't know how Fernando Meirelles made City of God. It's so courageous, so truthful. I think it's the best picture I've ever seen". Meirelles himself cited Altman's work as an influence on his own career.

The film was not without criticism. Peter Rainer of New York magazine stated that while the film was "powerful", it was also "rather numbing". John Powers of LA Weekly wrote that although "[the film] whirs with energy for nearly its full 130-minute running time, it is oddly lacking in emotional heft for a work that aspires to be so epic—it is essentially a tarted up exploitation picture whose business is to make ghastly things fun".

Ivana Bentes, a Brazilian film critic, criticised the film for its depiction of the favela and her view that it glorified issues of poverty and violence as means of "domestication of the most radical themes of culture and Brazilian cinema ... as products for export." Bentes targets the film specifically in saying that: "City of God promotes tourism in hell".

City of God was ranked No. 3 in Film4's "50 Films to See Before You Die", and No. 7 in Empire magazine's "The 100 Best Films of World Cinema" in 2010. It was also ranked No. 6 on The Guardian's list of "the 25 Best Action Movies Ever". It was ranked No. 1 in Paste magazine's 50 best movies of the decade of the 2000s. Time listed it as one of the 100 greatest films of all time.

In 2012, the Motion Picture Editors Guild listed City of God as the 17th-best-edited film of all time based on a survey of its members.

==== Top ten lists ====
The film appeared on several American critics' top ten lists of the best films of 2003.

- 2nd – Chicago Sun-Times (Roger Ebert) (for 2002)
- 2nd – The Charlotte Observer (Lawrence Toppman)
- 2nd – Chicago Tribune (Marc Caro)
- 4th – New York Post (Jonathan Foreman)
- 4th – Time (Richard Corliss)
- 5th – Portland Oregonian (Shawn Levy)
- 7th – Chicago Tribune (Michael Wilmington)
- 10th – The Hollywood Reporter (Michael Rechtshaffen)
- 10th – New York Post (Megan Lehmann)
- 10th – The New York Times (Stephen Holden)

It ranked number 38 on the BBC list of best 100 films of the 21st century. In 2021, members of Writers Guild of America West (WGAW) and Writers Guild of America, East (WGAE) voted its screenplay 70th in WGA's 101 Greatest Screenplays of the 21st Century (so far). In June 2025, it ranked number 15 on The New York Times' list of "The 100 Best Movies of the 21st Century" and number 37 on the "Readers' Choice" edition of the list. In July 2025, it ranked number 96 on Rolling Stone's list of "The 100 Best Movies of the 21st Century."

=== MV Bill's response ===
Brazilian rapper MV Bill, a resident of Cidade de Deus, said the film had "brought no good to the favela, no social, moral, or human benefit." He said, "The world will know that they exploited the image of the children who live here in Cidade de Deus. What is obvious is that they are going to carry a bigger stigma throughout their lives; it has only become greater because of the film."

=== Awards and nominations ===
City of God won fifty-five awards and received another twenty-nine nominations. Among those:

Organization	Award	Recipient	Result	Ref
Academy Awards	Best Director	Fernando Meirelles	Nominated	
Academy Awards	Best Adapted Screenplay	Bráulio Mantovani	Nominated	
Academy Awards	Best Cinematography	César Charlone	Nominated	
Academy Awards	Best Film Editing	Daniel Rezende	Nominated	
AFI Fest	Audience Award		Won	
Broadcast Film Critics Association Awards	Best Foreign Language Film		Nominated	
British Academy Film Awards	Best Editing	Daniel Rezende	Won	
British Academy Film Awards	Best Foreign Film	Andrea Barata Ribeiro, Mauricio Andrade Ramos, Fernando Meirelles	Nominated	
British Independent Film Awards	Best Foreign Independent Film		Won	
Chicago Film Critics Association Awards	Best Foreign Language Film		Won	
Golden Trailer Awards	Best Independent Foreign Film		Won	
Grande Prêmio do Cinema Brasileiro	Best Film		Won	
Grande Prêmio do Cinema Brasileiro	Best Director	Fernando Meirelles	Won	
Grande Prêmio do Cinema Brasileiro	Best Adapted Screenplay	Bráulio Mantovani	Won	
Grande Prêmio do Cinema Brasileiro	Best Cinematography	César Charlone	Won	
Grande Prêmio do Cinema Brasileiro	Best Editing	Daniel Rezende	Won	
Grande Prêmio do Cinema Brasileiro	Best Sound	Guilherme Ayrosa, Paulo Ricardo Nunes, Alessandro Laroca, Alejandro Quevedo, Carlos Honc, Roland Thai, Rudy Pi, Adam Sawelson	Won	
Grande Prêmio do Cinema Brasileiro	Best Actor	Leandro Firmino	Nominated	
Grande Prêmio do Cinema Brasileiro	Best Actress	Roberta Rodrigues	Nominated	
Grande Prêmio do Cinema Brasileiro	Best Supporting Actor	Jonathan Haagensen	Nominated	
Grande Prêmio do Cinema Brasileiro	Best Supporting Actor	Douglas Silva	Nominated	
Grande Prêmio do Cinema Brasileiro	Best Supporting Actress	Alice Braga	Nominated	
Grande Prêmio do Cinema Brasileiro	Best Supporting Actress	Graziela Moretto	Nominated	
Grande Prêmio do Cinema Brasileiro	Best Art Direction	Tulé Peak	Nominated	
Grande Prêmio do Cinema Brasileiro	Best Costume Design	Bia Salgado, Inês Salgado	Nominated	
Grande Prêmio do Cinema Brasileiro	Best Makeup	Anna Van Steen	Nominated	
Grande Prêmio do Cinema Brasileiro	Best Soundtrack	Antonio Pinto, Ed Côrtes	Nominated	
Independent Spirit Awards	Best Foreign Language Film	Fernando Meirelles	Nominated	
Las Vegas Film Critics Society Awards	Best Foreign Language Film		Won	
Motion Picture Sound Editors	Best Sound Editing in a Foreign Film	Martín Hernández, Roland N. Thai, Alessandro Laroca	Won	
New York Film Critics Circle Awards	Best Foreign Language Film		Won	
Prism Awards	Best Theatrical Film		Won	
Satellite Awards	Best Foreign Language Film		Won	
Southeastern Film Critics Association Awards	Best Foreign Language Film		Won	
Toronto Film Critics Association Awards	Best Foreign Language Film		Won	
Toronto International Film Festival	Visions Award – Special Citation		Won	

== Legacy ==
In an interview with Slant Magazine, Meirelles states he had met with Brazil's former and current president Luiz Inácio Lula da Silva who told him about the impact the film has had on both policies and public security within the country. The film has also sparked major increase in film productions, with over 45 being done during 2002. Films such as The Motorcycle Diaries and The Intruder are some of the films which have used Brazil for film production.

The 2013 documentary City of God – 10 Years Later reunites the cast and crew of City of God and takes a look at how their lives have changed after the original film's release. In a BBC article written at the time of the documentary's release, Firmino mentions that the cast had mixed careers after the film's release. Firmino says that Jefechander Suplino, who played Clipper, could not be found by the documentary producers. His mother, however, believes him to still be alive, but is unaware of his whereabouts. Seu Jorge, who played Knockout Ned, had a better career after the film and became a major musician, performing at the London 2012 Olympic Games closing ceremony.

City of God: The Fight Rages On, a miniseries set two decades after the events of the film, premiered in August 2024.

== Home media ==
=== North America ===
The film's international distributor Miramax released the film on DVD in the United States on June 8, 2004.

In 2010, Miramax was sold by Disney (their owners since 1993), with the studio being taken over by private equity firm Filmyard Holdings that same year. Filmyard sublicensed the home video rights for several Miramax titles to Lionsgate, who released City of God on Blu-ray on December 13, 2011.

Filmyard sold Miramax to Qatari company beIN Media Group during March 2016. In April 2020, ViacomCBS (now known as Paramount Skydance) acquired the rights to Miramax's library, after buying a 49% stake in the studio from beIN. The film was made available on their streaming service Paramount+, and in 2021, Paramount Home Entertainment reissued City of God on Blu-ray, along with many other Miramax titles. Paramount Home Entertainment also issued the film on a double-feature Blu-ray with City of Men, another Miramax title they had acquired in 2020.

== See also ==
- Docufiction
- List of docufiction films
- List of hood films
- List of submissions to the 75th Academy Awards for Best Foreign Language Film
- List of Brazilian submissions for the Academy Award for Best International Feature Film
- Sambhavami Yuge Yuge (2006 film), an Indian remake
