= Kátia Lund =

Brazilian film director and screenwriter (born 1966)

Kátia Lund (born March 13, 1966) is a Brazilian film director and screenwriter. Her most notable work was as co-director of the film City of God.

== Early life ==
Lund was born in São Paulo, to American parents who emigrated to Brazil before she was born. She graduated from Escola Maria Imaculada, an American Catholic school in São Paulo where she excelled in art. She then attended Brown University, where she became interested in filmmaking.

== Career ==
After she graduated magna cum laude, she landed jobs as an assistant director on many music videos, commercials and films. Having grown up in a middle-class family, she had little knowledge of the plight of those living in Rio de Janeiro's favelas. Then, she was hired to work on the Spike Lee-directed music video for Michael Jackson's "They Don't Care About Us" which was filmed in a favela. (Note: The favela where the "They Don't Care About Us" music video was recorded is Favela Santa Marta, located in the neighborhood of Botafogo, South Zone of Rio de Janeiro.) The experience opened her eyes and she became determined to make films about the dwellers of these poor neighborhoods to help raise social consciousness in Brazil. She has caused controversy for her friendship with, and admiration for, deceased Brazilian drug dealer Marcinho VP. (It's important to note that Lund’s friend was Márcio Amaro de Oliveira, the Marcinho VP who controlled drug trafficking in Rio’s Santa Marta/Dona Marta favela during the 1990s. He was killed by strangulation inside the Bangu III prison in July 2003. He should not be confused with Márcio dos Santos Nepomuceno, another, still-living trafficker known by the same nickname and associated with the Complexo do Alemão and the Comando Vermelho). (Note: In the Brazilian criminal underworld, there are/were two notorious drug lords in Rio de Janeiro with the nickname "Marcinho VP": Márcio dos Santos Nepomuceno, better known as "Marcinho VP do Complexo do Alemão" (top boss of the Comando Vermelho, the largest criminal organization of Rio de Janeiro) and Márcio Amaro de Oliveira, better known as "Marcinho VP da Favela Santa Marta" (head of drug trafficking in the Favela Santa Marta, in Rio de Janeiro/RJ). The Marcinho VP mentioned in this Wikipedia article is Márcio Amaro de Oliveira ("Marcinho VP da Favela Santa Marta") who was murdered on July 29, 2003 in Rio de Janeiro/RJ, allegedly at the behest of Márcio dos Santos Nepomuceno ("Marcinho VP do Complexo do Alemão").).

Lund oversees an organization called Nós do Cinema (We of Cinema), which began with the young people from the cast of City of God who are real dwellers of Rio's favelas. Lund initially started her non-profit acting school to find the cast for City of God. Nós do Cinema offers courses and job opportunities in films to poor children and holds screenings and discussions that help to raise social consciousness through film. She also directed the segment "Bilú e João" of the 2005 anthology film All the Invisible Children.

== Filmography ==
Year	Title
1997	Anaconda
1999	News From a Personal War
2001	Golden Gate
2002	City of God
2005	All the Invisible Children
2014	Boys from Vila Belmiro
2016	Guti & the Theater of Dreams
2016	Gira & the Circus of Life
2016	Bad & the Birdieman
2016	Movie Motion Magic
2016	Jongo Fever

== Awards and nominations ==
In 1996, she began work on the documentary Notícias de uma Guerra Particular (News of a Private War), an exploration of the ongoing battle between the favelas' heavily armed drug dealers (many of whom are small children) and Rio de Janeiro's police. It was released in 1999 to critical acclaim and was nominated for an Emmy after airing on PBS. The success of the film made her an in-demand director of music videos for Brazil's hip-hop artists. She won numerous MTV Video Music Awards Latin America.

In 2001, Lund was invited by Fernando Meirelles to co-direct Golden Gate (Palace II), a short film about two young boys in a favela. The film won several awards in film festivals all over the world. Lund and Meirelles continued their collaboration with the film City of God which received international acclaim and was nominated for four Academy Awards including best director (Lund was not nominated, only Meirelles received recognition from the academy). The success of that film was the springboard for the television series City of Men, a continuation of the story told in Golden Gate. Lund produced the show with Meirelles and directed four episodes. The show was a major hit in Brazil.
