= Cidade dos Homens =

Brazilian television show

- Title design
- Created by: Fernando Meirelles; Kátia Lund
- Country of origin: Brazil
- Original language: Portuguese
- No. of seasons: 6
- No. of episodes: 27

Production
- Running time: approx. 30 minutes

Original release
- Network: TV Globo
- Release: October 15, 2002 – December 16, 2005
- Release: January 15, 2017 – January 5, 2018

Cidade dos Homens (English title: City of Men) is a Brazilian television show created by Kátia Lund and Fernando Meirelles, the directors of the film City of God. The series was watched by 35 million viewers in Brazil and was released internationally on DVD shortly after the film. In 2007, a feature-length film based on the series (produced by Fox and TV Globo), also titled City of Men, was released.

It is often cited as a "spin-off" of the film City of God. City of Men is a less violent and more light-hearted affair with dramedy elements (the film adaptation is darker, sharing its roots of City of God). However, the two do share some common aspects: the directors, some of the actors, and the setting of the Brazilian favela with its background of gangsters and poverty.

The show tells the stories of Luis Cláudio and Uólace, better known by their nicknames Acerola (Douglas Silva) and Laranjinha (Darlan Cunha), respectively, who are two best friends who live in a notorious Rio slum, in a community of drug dealers, hustlers, and teenagers struggling to fulfill their dreams.

== Production ==
A co-production of Meirelles (through his studio, O2 Filmes) and Globo TV, the largest TV channel in Brazil, the show aired Fridays, at 11 p.m. (local Brazilian time: -3 UTC) for four seasons.

Each season aired roughly one year after the previous one, and the characters, as it happens with the actors who portray them, are shown to age from one season to the next. As a result, the stories of each season reflect the struggles of poor kids from Rio de Janeiro in the appropriate age group: in Season 1, the characters are about 13 years old, that is, barely out of childhood and into adolescence; Season 4 (the final season) shows them age 17, on the verge of adulthood, and the evolution of their dilemmas. A film in which Laranjinha and Acerola are turning eighteen, also titled City of Men, was released in Brazil and in the United States in 2007.

Silva and Cunha starred in the 2000 short film Palace II, directed by Meirelles, a dry run for the film City of God. In the short, Silva played Larinjinha and Cunha played Acerola.

== Episodes ==
=== Original Series ===
The dates listed below are the original air dates on Globo TV and original DVD releases in Brazil (except for the international DVD release).

==== Season 1 ====
Produced in 2002 (aired between October 4 and October 18), released on DVD on February 12, 2003

1. A Coroa do Imperador (The Emperor's Crown)
  - When their history teacher announces a surprise plan to take the class on an educational field trip to see The Emperor's Crown and learn more about the Napoleonic Wars, Laranjinha and Acerola greet the news with ambivalence as they need to come up with the R$6.50 it will cost each of them to go. A war breaks out in the favela and Acerola comes to realize its similarity to the Napoleonic Wars.
2. O Cunhado do Cara (The Man's Brother-in-Law)
  - When Acerola's sister starts dating the "Favela boss" (a drug dealer) everybody suddenly starts to respect him. He has never had this much status in the neighborhood before—and he has never had this much temptation to abuse it. Acerola goes too far with his newfound powers and strains his friendship with Laranjinha.
3. Correio (The Post)
  - Laranjinha and Acerola become the favela's postmen. Acerola's favela is so dangerous that even the government will not deliver mail there, a serious problem that irks the residents and prompts a local drug lord to make Acerola the ad hoc postmaster. Acerola and Laranjinha try to make some improvements to the system and initiate a scheme to name the streets of the favela.
4. Uólace e João Vitor (Uólace and João Vitor)
  - A day in the life of Uólace (Laranjinha) and João Victor. On any given day, 13-year-old Laranjinha is struggling to survive in his dangerous favela, where violence runs rampant and hunger is a way of life. Meanwhile, in a well-appointed apartment overlooking Laranjinha's neighborhood, 13-year-old João Vitor (Thiago Martins) has a radically different perspective. João Vitor is a middle-class boy raised by his single mother. The apparent differences between the two lives are subsumed by their similarities.

==== Season 2 ====
Produced in 2003 (aired between October 14 and November 11), released on DVD on February 27, 2004

1. Sábado (Saturday)
  - Like most teenagers living in favelas, Larajinha and Acerola cannot wait for the funk carioca dance. Armed with a new hairstyle, Laranjinha looks forward to an all-night dance party, where he aims to make out with at least four pretty girls. Meanwhile, Acerola hopes his performance with a funk dance group will impress a classmate (Camila Monteiro).
2. Dois Pra Brasília (Two Tickets to Brasília)
  - Determined to help a girl he likes get her grandfather out of prison (he has been in prison for two and half years longer than his sentence), Acerola enlists Laranjinha and a borrowed camcorder from the neighborhood to film his journey from Rio to the capital city of Brasília, all so he can deliver a letter to President Luiz Inácio Lula da Silva.
3. Tem Que Ser Agora (It Has to Be Now)
  - The beach, the great leveller of Brazilian society, where all the social classes meet. Laranjinha and Acerola are on a mission to deliver some surfboards, head to the coast and find that everyone else in Rio had the same idea. The holiday takes an unexpected turn when the boys catch wind of a rumor that, if true, could have serious implications. Laranjinha flirts with Camila and finds out she is an upper middle-class girl. Duda tries to avoid João when she finds he is from the favela. Suddenly, a group of middle-class 'playboys' starts a confrontation. In the middle of all this confusion the teenagers only think about one thing: losing their virginity.
4. Os Ordinários (The Ordinaries)
  - While surfing, Acerola saves a wealthy Japanese-Brazilian boy from drowning at the beach, his actions spark an unexpected friendship that crosses color and socioeconomic boundaries. They bond and Acerola, Laranjinha and João start hanging out with the boy and his brother, who are from São Paulo. The result is a group they dub The Ordinaries.
5. Buraco Quente (Hot Spot)
  - Laranjinha's Cousin Espeto (Phelipe Haagensen) manages drug dealing in his area. When Espeto has a near-death experience, it prompts him to reevaluate his life, and his career as a criminal. Espeto wants out, but leaving the business can be tough, so Laranjinha and Acerola help out.

==== Season 3 ====
Produced in 2004 (aired between September 24 and October 22), released on DVD on March 30, 2005

1. A Estréia (Opening Night - First Time)
  - When Acerola's mother goes out of town for the weekend and leaves him without a chaperone, the boys vow to practice their romantic skills with some local girls.
2. Foi Sem Querer (It Was an Accident)
  - When Laranjinha romances a pretty girl who already has a boyfriend, he has to enlist Acerola for protection. Meanwhile, the boys try their hand at a small business to raise money for the favela's community center.
3. Vacilo É Um Só (Can't Screw Up Twice - Take It Like a Man)
  - Learning about the breeding habits of tiny ants in school prompts Laranjinha, Acerola and their classmates to think about their own sexuality. Meanwhile, Acerola strives to stay out of trouble by spending the day with the leader of the favela's community association.
4. Hip Sampa Hop
  - When Laranjinha's cousin, Espeto, announces that he is taking a trip to São Paulo, Laranjinha and Acerola decide to tag along. Once there, they discover the city's vibrant hip-hop scene and become immersed in the culture—and the drama that goes along with it.
5. Pais e Filhos (Fathers and Sons - Parents and Kids)
  - When Laranjinha and Acerola apply for social security at work, it prompts thoughts about their futures and jump-starts Laranjinha's quest for his own "lost" father.

==== Season 4 (final season) ====
Produced in 2005 (aired between November 18 and December 16), released on DVD on April 25, 2006

1. A Fila (The Line)
2. Tá Sobrando Mês (Too Many Days in a Month)
3. Atração Fatal (Fatal Attraction)
4. As Aparências Enganam (Appearances Can Be Deceiving)
5. Em Algum Lugar do Futuro (Somewhere in the Future)^{N}

^{N} Finale special: animated episode projecting the future of the main characters.

=== Sequel Series ===
In 2017 (10 years after the movie) a new series was aired, continuing the story about Laranjinha and Acerola, now fathers of their own sons: Davi (Luan Pessoa) and Clayton (Carlos Eduardo Jay), respectively. The boys have the same relationship as their fathers had when youngsters.

==== Season 5 (2017) ====
The first season follows the discovery of a fatal heart disease in Davi. The situation develops when Clayton steals money from a drug lord. Laranjinha wants to use the money to pay for his son's surgery, as Acelora fears retaliation from the drug dealers.

==== Season 6 (2018) ====
Laranjinha faces the return of his ex-wife and mother of Davi. Poderosa (Roberta Rodrigues), who left the boy when he was still a baby, and now intends to do everything to see him again, despite the father's disagreement. The second season sees the return of João Vitor, now Davi and Clayton's teacher.

== International DVD release ==
Internationally, a DVD was released including the episodes from both seasons 1 and 2. The DVD was released on 27 September 2004.

1. The Emperor's Crown
2. The Man's Brother-in-Law
3. The Post
4. Uólace And João Vitor
5. Saturday/Sunday
6. The Two On Their Way To Brasília
7. It Has To Be Now
8. The Ordinaries
9. Hot Spot

=== Entire Series - US DVD ===
- Actors: Leandro Firmino, Alexandre Rodrigues, Daniel Zettel, See more
- Directors: Philippe Barcinski, César Charlone
- Format: Box set, Color, Full Screen, Subtitled, NTSC
- Language: Portuguese
- Region: Region 1 (U.S. and Canada only.)
- Number of discs: 3
- Rating NR
- Studio: Palm Pictures / Unvd
- DVD Release Date: September 26, 2006
- Run Time: 570 minutes
- DVD Features:
  - Available Subtitles: English
  - Available Audio Tracks: Portuguese (Unknown Format)
  - 19 episodes on three discs

== Soundtrack ==
- "Homem Amarelo" - O Rappa
- "Qual é?" - Marcelo D2
- "A Fumaça Já Subiu pra Cuca" - Bezerra da Silva
- "Morro e Asfalto" - Darlan Cunha / Thiago Martins
- "Vem Cristiane" - MC Tam
- "Us Mano e As Mina" - Xis
- "Sonho Juvenil (Garoto Zona Sul)" - Jovelina Pérola Negra
- "João Teimoso" - MC Pé de Pano
- "Prioridades" - Bnegão
- "Quando Eu Contar (Iaiá)" - Zeca Pagodinho
- "Dama Tereza" - Sabotage
- "Sou Feia Mas Tô na Moda" - Tati Quebra Barraco
- "Menina Crioula" - Jorge Ben Jor
- "Lixo do Mangue" - Chico Science e Nação Zumbi

== Reception ==
Cidade dos Homens received highly positive reviews from the American press upon release. On Metacritic, the first season of the show has a score of 87 out of 100 based on 7 professional reviews, indicating "[u]niversal acclaim". Tim Goodman, writing for San Francisco Chronicle, praised it for having "the kind of energy you don't get often on American television, and the realness of the shot-on-location scene really makes each episode feel like a minimovie." Whilst noting its stylistic similarities to City of God, Goodman wrote that "the series lacks the relentless violence of the film," even though "it's not without the same ominous sense of death." According to Charles McGrath of The New York Times, "[t]he closest American popular television has ever come to this kind of close-up realism is probably the drug-dealing scenes in "The Wire" on HBO, and even they seem a little tame and stagey compared with what takes place in Dona Marta." ""City of Men" is more than just a fictionalized documentary, though;" he continues, "it has real humor and sweetness, much of it derived from the interaction of Acerelo and Laranjinha, who are an inspired buddy pair." Slate's Troy Patterson wrote that it "smoothly toggles between working as a crime melodrama and a coming-of-age tale, as a harrowing piece of social commentary and a gentle bit of farce. It eludes genre categorization, but if one of the nihilistic children it depicts were to put his gun to my head, I’d say it was a situation comedy—one in which the situation is that life is both cheap and beautiful." Heather Havrilesky of Salon called it "[u]nlike anything else you've ever seen on TV." The Los Angeles Times' Robert Lloyd took issue with the show's "occasional paroxysms of style or hammered-home points" in an otherwise positive review where he praised the show for its "immense vitality and persuasive naturalism".
