= The Many Faces of Jesus =

1973 screenplay and abandoned film by Jens Jørgen Thorsen

The Many Faces of Jesus, alternately The Sex Life of Jesus or The Love Affairs of Jesus, (Note: The Many Faces of Jesus and The Sex Life of Jesus are the two primary titles used to refer to the film. The Love Affairs of Jesus was the title in use when the screenplay was published as the book Thorsens Jesusfilm ('Thorsen's Jesus Film'). Contemporaneous news reports use a variety of other titles, and some also change "Jesus" to "Christ" or "Jesus Christ".) is a screenplay and abandoned film by Danish writer and director Jens Jørgen Thorsen, which pornographically depicts Jesus engaged in homosexual and heterosexual sex acts, as well as drunkenness and robbery. After Thorsen announced his plans for a film in 1973, having secured funding from the government-run Danish Film Institute, the depiction of Jesus' sexuality immediately created controversy in Denmark and abroad: Thousands of Christians protested in the street, two parties ran on a platform against the film in the 1973 Danish general election, and opponents of the film firebombed the Danish ambassador's residence in Rome shortly after Pope Paul VI condemned it. Thorsen failed to secure funding in at least three countries, was blocked from producing the film in at least two, (Note: Thorsen failed to secure funding in Denmark (twice), Sweden, and the United States; the second failure in Denmark and the failure in Sweden were due to government intervention. France banned Thorsen from producing the film, while Israel said it would not allow him entry if he intended to produce it (but did not ban him personally). Brief, sometimes conflicting references in news articles assert production bans or failure to secure funding in Finland (where a ban was, at a minimum, attempted), Italy, Spain, and West Germany.) and was personally banned from entering the United Kingdom—where Queen Elizabeth II made a rare comment on a public matter, calling the planned film "obnoxious" through a spokesman. Even after Thorsen abandoned his plans in 1978, Canada's Revenue Minister banned import of the film despite acknowledging uncertainty as to whether it existed.

A Danish translation of the screenplay was published as a book in Denmark in 1975; Grove Press in the United States declined to publish an English version in subsequent years. (Note: There is some dispute as to when Grove declined the manuscript.) Thorsen won a partial legal victory in 1989, when a Danish court overturned the government's determination that The Many Faces of Jesus violated the moral rights of the authors of the canonical gospels, but declined to regrant the funding. He subsequently made a non-pornographic film about Jesus, The Return, which received lackluster reviews. In the United States, a long-running hoax emerged falsely claiming that a movie similar to The Many Faces was in production, which has endured as a chain letter for 40 years.

== Background: Pornography in Denmark; Thorsen's plans ==
After Denmark legalized pornography in 1969, director Jens Jørgen Thorsen became involved in the production of erotic films, including Quiet Days in Clichy, then post-war Denmark's most successful film. Thorsen, a provocateur, used pornography to, in the words of author Jack Stevenson, "provoke the authorities and unsettle the bourgeoisie" in a country that used censorship to control the population. Thorsen was fascinated with both Jesus and sex, appearing on a magazine cover in 1963 as a crucified Santa Claus with a cannon for a penis. Creating a pornographic film about Jesus became his greatest goal. He explained:

I believe the best way to give the Pope a forceful kick in the ass is to turn up the heat on Jesus. ... In the film when Jesus rises up out of the grave he'll ball a farmer girl. A nice blonde girl. That by itself signifies in my opinion what Jesus ought to stand for, instead of standing for the repression of life and eroticism.

Thorsen repeatedly criticized the government-run Danish Film Institute (DFI)'s filmmaking fund in the 1960s. In 1972, the DFI rejected an application to fund Thorsen's desired film about Jesus. The same year, however, the funding system was changed by act of the Folketing (Parliament). Journalist Flemming Behrendt and director Gert Fredholm both had authority to approve grants of the DFI. Behrendt declined to fund Thorsen's plans, but Fredholm authorized a grant of 600,000 kr., at the same time acknowledging that the film was poised to be "blasphemous, pornographic, sadistic, obscene, and poetic". Thorsen secured a location for shooting in Apt, Vaucluse, France.

Thorsen's planned film, The Many Faces of Jesus, would depict Jesus as a drunk, a bank robber, and a lover of both John the Baptist and Mary Magdalene. In one scene, Jesus was to strip in the presence of a group of prostitutes and chant "Prophet save us, God Hare Krishna, Hallelujah, Red Front, Heil Hitler". Previous artists like Luis Buñuel and Pier Paolo Pasolini had depicted Jesus in film in provocative manners, but Thorsen deliberately courted controversy and criticism.

== 1973: Scandal in Denmark; condemnation by Paul VI; ban in France ==
Denmark and France's decisions quickly led to both domestic and international controversy, exacerbated by media coverage that included Thorsen astride a rocket, which he said Jesus' penis would match in size in the film. Five thousand Christians protested in the street in Denmark. The German Catholic newspaper Neue Bildpost unsuccessfully sought the intervention of Queen Margrethe II. Denmark's blasphemy law was discussed but never invoked. The film became a major campaign issue in the 1973 Danish general election, contributing to the Christian People's Party and Progressive Party's entrance to power.

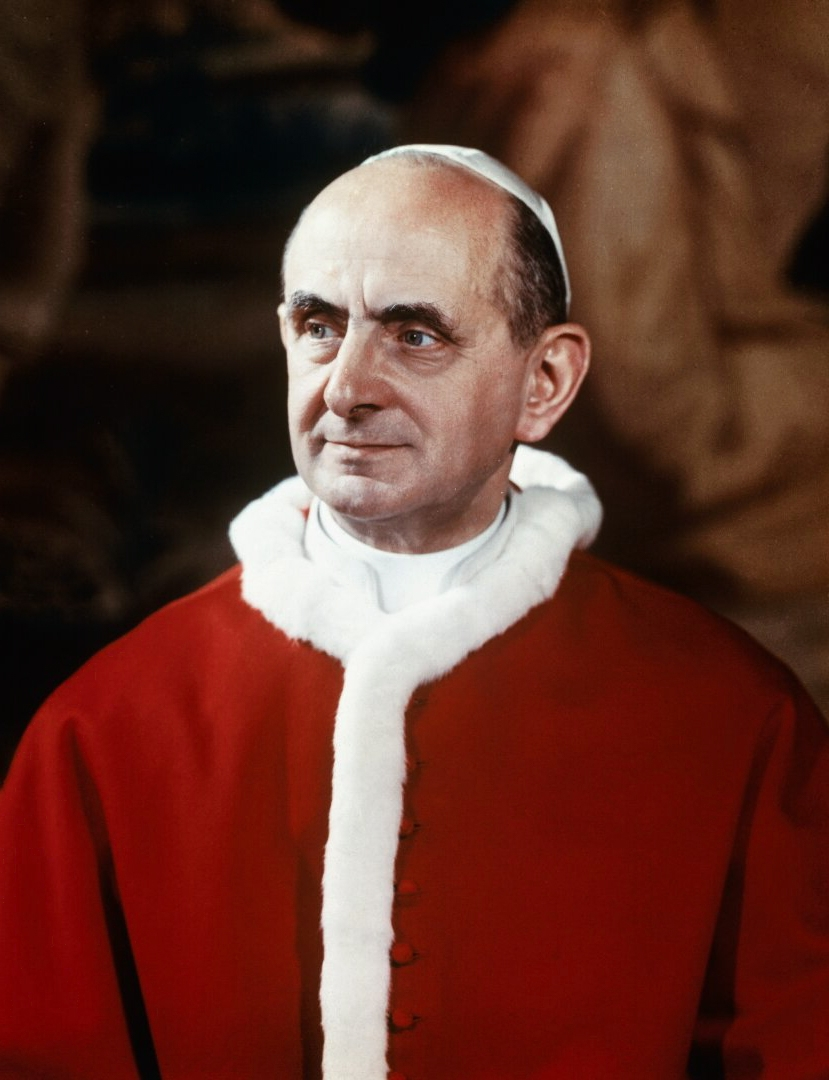
Pope Paul VI condemned the film in a Sunday sermon.

Internationally, Pope Paul VI condemned the film on 26 August, to which Thorsen responded with an offer to play Judas. The Danish ambassador's residence in Rome was attacked with Molotov cocktails on 28 August, while the embassy in Madrid received bomb threats around the same time. Culture Minister Niels Matthiasen criticized the church as "reactionary", a characterization which was in turn criticized by Minister for Ecclesiastical Affairs Dorte Bennedsen. Also on 28 August, André Astoux, director of the French Centre national du cinéma et de l'image animée, banned the film from being produced in the country, where it was on the eve of being filmed in Apt. Astoux cited a desire to not blaspheme against the world's one billion Christians. The leftist newspaper L'Humanité condemned the decision as setting a "grave precedent" for suppressing freedom of expression at the whims of pressure groups. Thorsen, no longer able to provide a shooting schedule, lost his grant.

== 1975: Further funding issues in Denmark and Sweden ==
Thorsen's first attempt at producing the film led to calls to reform the DFI grant process. Under Poul Hartling's Venstre government, Justice Minister Nathalie Lind vowed to block any further efforts at producing the film in the absence of such a reform. In 1975, with the Social Democrats back in power, Thorsen again applied for funding, having secured a new location in Turkey. Director Stig Björkman, a DFI consultant, recommended approving a grant of 900,000 kr., 30% of the film's budget. According to DFI member Sven Grønlykke, Matthiasen implied potential political consequences to granting the request. Member Erik Thygesen said that Matthiasen feared a grant of funding could lead to the Anker Jørgensen government's removal from power. The DFI nonetheless approved a grant of 900,000 kr., and then resigned en masse. In 1976, however, the Danish Ministry of Culture ruled the project to be against the moral rights of the apostles Matthew, Mark, Luke, and John, overruling the DFI. Later that year, the Swedish Film Institute refused to fund the film. Finnish members of Parliament moved to prevent production in May 1976; a 1977 National Catholic News Service item mentions in passing an unsuccessful effort at production there.

Thorsen did publish a Danish translation of his screenplay, which at that point had the working title The Love Affairs of Jesus Christ, as a book in Denmark in 1975—Thorsens Jesusfilm ('Thorsen's Jesus film'). The Director of Public Prosecutions subsequently declined a request to prosecute Thorsen for the book. An unrelated hardcore pornographic film, Jesus Is in the House, was produced in Denmark in 1975 to capitalize on the controversy about The Many Faces of Jesus. It depicts Jesus amidst groups of people having sex, but does not show him engaging in it.

== 1976–1977: Condemnation by Elizabeth II; denial of entry to UK; ban in Israel ==
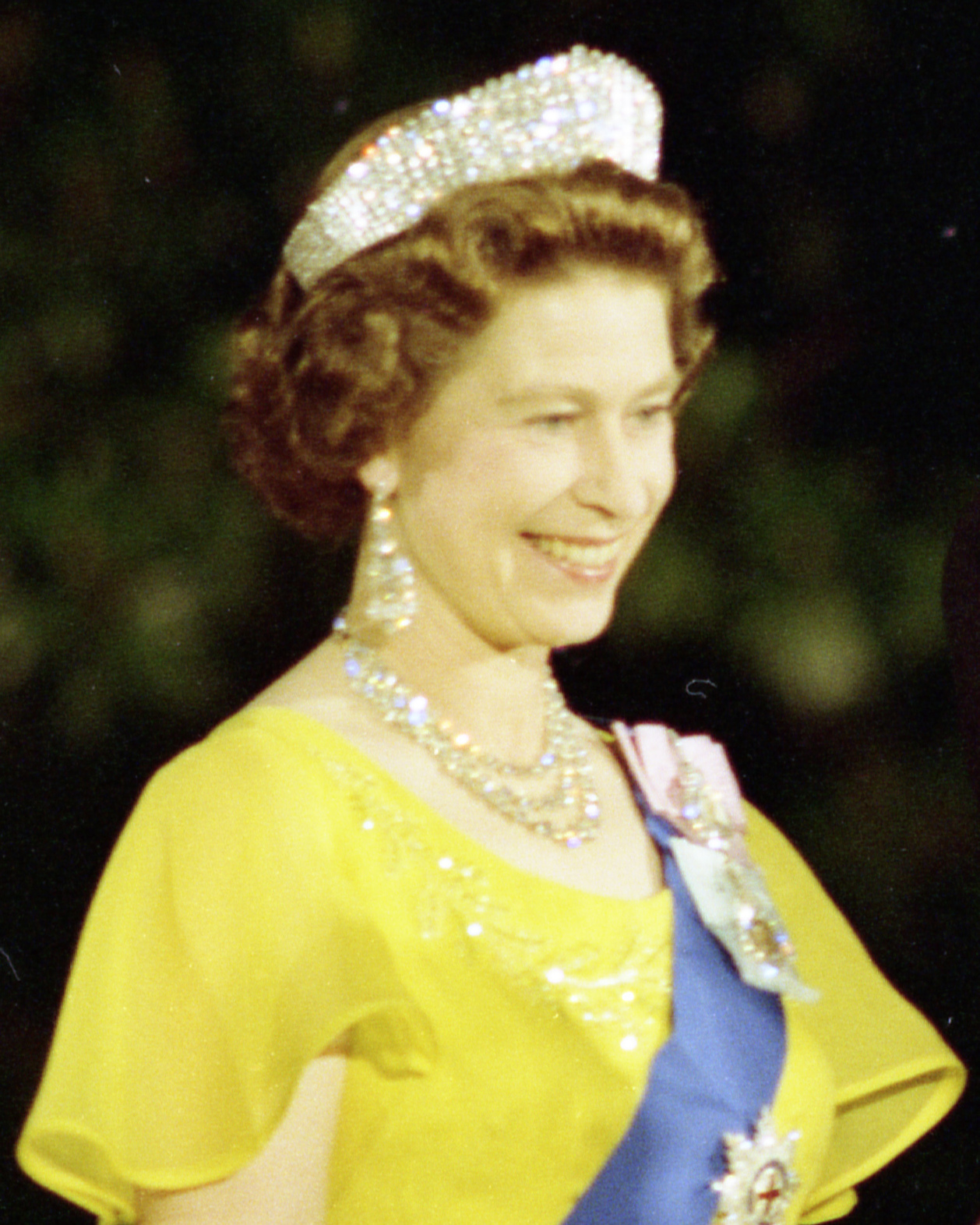
Queen Elizabeth II called Thorsen's plans "obnoxious", a rare statement on a public matter.

In 1976, Thorsen initiated plans to produce the film in the United Kingdom. Conservative activist Mary Whitehouse and the National Viewers' and Listeners' Association (NVALA) strongly objected both to the notion of the film and to Thorsen's presence in the country. Michael Ramsey (the Anglican Archbishop of Canterbury) and Basil Hume (the Catholic Archbishop of Westminster) opposed the film, and Hume called for Equity actors to refuse to participate in the production, a request the union refused. Prime Minister James Callaghan said that Thorsen would be "a most unwelcome and undesirable visitor to these shores"; NVALA members wrote letters to Queen Elizabeth II, who through a spokesman responded that the planned film was "obnoxious", an unusual comment on a matter of public debate. In response, Thorsen criticized Elizabeth for "talk[ing] about my future famous film without knowing anything at all about it".

Britons were overwhelmingly opposed to Thorsen. Ramsey, Callaghan, and The Times raised the prospect of action under the United Kingdom's blasphemy laws. None was brought, but it did influence Whitehouse's subsequent blasphemy prosecution of Gay News over a poem depicting Jesus as gay. The NVALA commissioned an English translation of the screenplay (Note: Thorsens Jesusfilm, published in 1975, bears the subtitle "An Unabridged Translation into Danish by the Author" (en uforkortet overættelse til dansk ved forfatteren). Whitehouse, however, wrote in 1977 that she had had a copy of the script translated into English, a description repeated by academics Peter Jones and Tim Newburn. Whitehouse did not specify whether the version translated from was Thorsens Jesusfilm, a Danish-language manuscript, or something else.) and sent it to William Whitelaw, the shadow home secretary, and urged the Home Office to deny Thorsen entry. Member of Parliament Ivan Lawrence sought to have the film banned outright; Home Secretary Merlyn Rees said that this was not within the office's power, but expressed openness to denying Thorsen entry. Thorsen countered that he had a right to enter the United Kingdom as a citizen of a European Economic Community (EEC) country, a point which was debated in legal circles for several months.

On 9 February 1977, Thorsen arrived at Heathrow Airport to promote a different film, Promise of 13. Upon learning that Thorsen was carrying a copy of The Many Faces of Jesus screenplay, the immigration officer denied him entry. Rees explained, to cheers in Parliament, that the action was "on the grounds that his exclusion was conducive to the public good", an exception to EEC freedom of movement rules. Thorsen, before departing the country, told the press that the queen's commentary on the matter was not "bright", but that "then again, it was the first time she had used her brains, so perhaps it was a good thing". Whitehouse's biographers Michael Tracey and David Morrison describe the affair as "one of the few occasions for a very long time when there had been a massive and public consensus on a moral issue".

Overlapping with the British controversy, Thorsen sought to produce the film in Israel. The Israeli Ministry of Interior said in January 1977 that it would act "to prevent offense to the sensitivities of the believers of any faith". In response to a query by Rabbi Marc H. Tanenbaum on behalf of Mother Basilea Schlink, the ministry wrote that Thorsen had "not applied to enter Israel for the purposes of filming", but that if he did so "he would be denied entry" because of the offense the film might cause.

== 1977–1978: Funding issues in U.S.; import ban in Canada ==
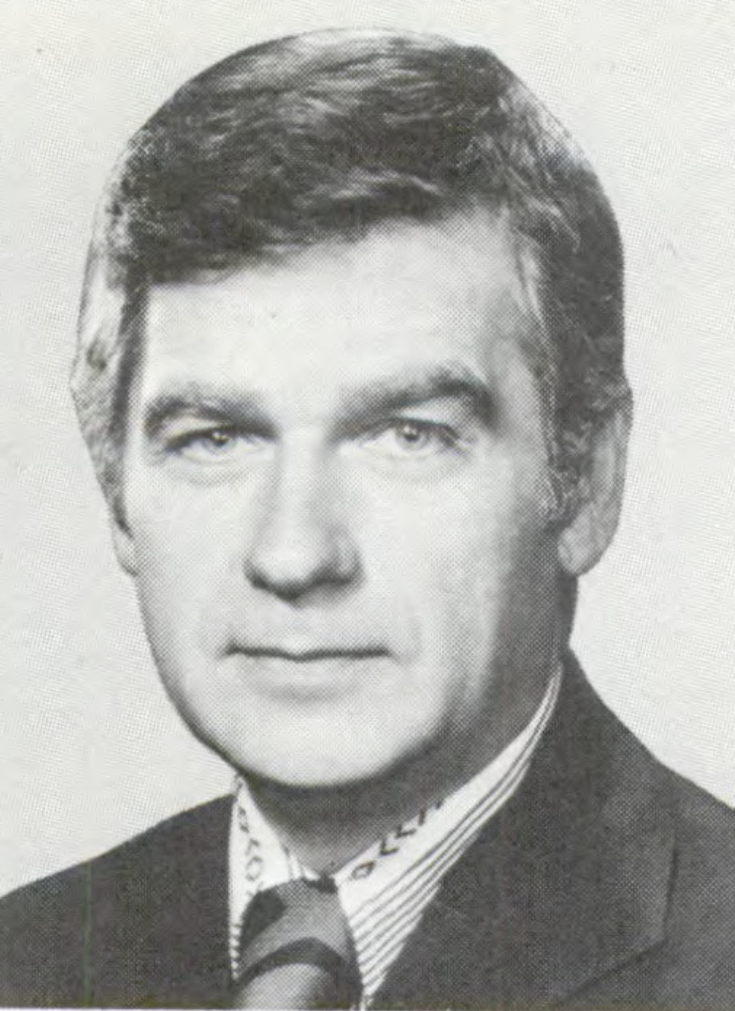
Senator Mark Hatfield corresponded with Grove Press about Thorsen's efforts to publish the screenplay as a book.

Thorsen next attempted to produce the film in the United States, which he felt had relatively strong freedom of speech and of the press. In August 1977, U.S. media reported that David Grant, a British producer of pornographic films, had facilitated a deal to publish the screenplay as a book in the United States, with a US$600,000 advance going to Thorsen. By September, Grant was reporting that he had raised most of a $1.2 million budget to shoot the film in the United States. As in other countries, the plans sparked controversy, including inspiring a country song, "Hey Jesus, Don't You Worry", written by Edward A. Boucher and performed by Van Trevor. Outrage among Baptists, partly due to a prominent pastor's incorrect statement that the film was under production in the United States, prompted letters to Grove Press, to which Thorsen had submitted the book version of the screenplay, and to Senator Mark Hatfield, requesting legislation to censor the book. Hatfield, also a Baptist, responded that neither Congress nor president Jimmy Carter had the power to prevent the film's production.

In February 1978, the Baptist Press reported that Thorsen had failed to find a producer, but remained in discussions with Grove Press. Several weeks later, they reported that that plan had fallen through as well, with Grove's Barney Rosset rejecting the work on "aesthetic grounds". However, in a statement to The Tennessean in the intervening period, Rosset's wife (Note: The Tennessean does not specify Rosset's wife's name. He married five times.) said that Grove had rejected the book over a year prior and "never had any intention of publishing it". An aide to Hatfield countered that he had spoken to a Grove employee during that year and had been told the book remained under consideration. Hatfield's office had thus directed concerned letter-writers to Grove, which was in turn inundated with letters requesting that they not publish the book. Rosset's wife stressed that the decision not to publish predated the letter-writing campaign.

Similar letter-writing campaigns took place to senior government officials in Canada. Two months after Thorsen abandoned his plans to shoot the film, the Canadian government banned importation of a film "variously titled as The Many Faces of Jesus or The Three Faces of Jesus" under the Customs Act, which permits the seizure and destruction of works deemed immoral. The Canadian Press wrote that the government was "not sure of the origin or name of the movie or whether it actually exists", nor "whether anyone actually plans to bring it into Canada, [with] no certainty of its country of origin and kn[owing] of no Canadian who has seen it". In response to a statement by Senator Jack Marshall that the film had been banned in many countries, Revenue Minister Joseph-Philippe Guay later said that, despite having ordered the ban, he did "not believe that the film ha[d] been made at all", although he was aware of a previous attempt to do so.

=== Gay Jesus film hoax ===
Even after Thorsen's U.S. plans fell through, conservative Christian outcry over the film continued, leading to a decades-long hoax. In 1977, Modern People News of Illinois ran an article on the planned film and polled its readers on whether it should be filmed in the United States. A few months later they announced the results of the poll—99% opposed—and noted that Thorsen had desisted from the attempt. (They would later argue that, by forwarding objections to the film's would-be producers, they played a role in its demise.) Beginning in 1979, however, Modern People Productions (the magazine's publisher) began to receive thousands of letters protesting the film, based on a misunderstanding that Modern People Productions was itself to produce the film. This was the result of a widely forwarded chain letter, which described The Many Faces of Jesus in broad terms without naming it or Thorsen.

Over the decades the hoax has morphed to incorporate Corpus Christi, a 1997 play that depicts Jesus as gay (although not in sexualized terms). As of 2018, regulators around the world still receive complaints about the non-existent film.

== 1978–1992: Danish lawsuit and The Return ==
Thorsen went through various rounds of litigation with the DFI and the Ministry of Culture over the course of 11 years, centering on the decision that the screenplay violated the apostles' moral rights. A number of Danish cultural figures testified on Thorsen's behalf, including a young Lars von Trier, who was a fan of Quiet Days in Clichy.

At trial in 1989, Thorsen rebutted the claim of moral rights, arguing that the gospels were not a single work because they had too many authors and that his screenplay was not an adaptation of the Bible. The state argued that the work was blasphemous and pornographic and that the DFI members had approved it against their chairman's wishes to get a legal position, in some cases without having read the screenplay. On 10 October 1989, after a five-week trial, the court ruled that Thorsen had not violated the apostles' moral rights, but found the Ministry of Culture not liable and refused to reinstate the grant. Thorsen walked out of the courtroom midway through the verdict being read, protesting it as an act of "cultural pick-pocketing". The Christian People's Party criticized the decision from the opposite direction.

The Return features the pope dancing to "The Vatican Rag" by Tom Lehrer.

While Thorsen did not recoup the rescinded grant money, he did apply under a revised system for a grant for a new Jesus film, this one not containing pornographic content. He received 3 million kr. The resulting film, titled The Return (Danish: Jesus vender tilbage; alternately The Return of Jesus Christ), was released on 13 March 1992. It depicts Jesus in a romantic relationship with a woman, but was described by Maren Pust in Information as "compared to the rumors ... exceedingly chaste". Pust compared it to a 1960s comedy, noting a scene in which the pope dances to Tom Lehrer's "The Vatican Rag". Critic Morten Piil wrote that "This Thorsen provocation, especially the erotic component, is in 1992 hopelessly past its sell-by date, and what remains is a clumsy, slow-moving allegory full of old effects and shabby preachments". Jack Stevenson summarizes the reaction thusly:

Thorsen had become a bit of an artifact. His vision of sex as an assault on bourgeoisie conformity was so very '60s and clearly out of synch with the early '90s when it was well known that (unprotected) sex could just as easily kill you as liberate you. Thorsen was very much a creature of his times, for better or for worse, and the movie evinced that in every frame.

== Legacy ==
Thorsen died eight years after the release of The Return. During the Muhammad cartoons controversy of 2005, in which many Danish Muslims criticized Jyllands-Posten for publishing images of Muhammad, a number of commentators recalled the Many Faces controversy, leading in some cases to a reversal of positions. Jyllands-Posten itself had sided against Thorsen regarding Many Faces; Jytte Klausen in 2009 speculated that its position would be the opposite were the controversy to happen then. Stevenson wrote in 2015 that "Ironically the Danish right, so passionate today in their defense of freedom of speech when it applies to the satirizing of Islam, was somewhat less so back when Thorsen was satirizing Christianity".

== See also ==
- List of works depicting Jesus as LGBT, including:
  - Him (film), a gay pornographic film about Jesus
  - The First Temptation of Christ, a comedy depicting Jesus as non-heterosexual
- The Passover Plot (film), involved in some parallel controversies

== Notes and references ==
=== Sources ===
==== Academic sources and books ====
- Tracey, Michael; Morrison, David (1979). Whitehouse. Communications. London & Basingstoke: Macmillan. doi:10.1007/978-1-349-16200-0. ISBN 978-1-349-16200-0.
- Jones, Peter (April 1980). "Blasphemy, Offensiveness and Law". British Journal of Political Science. 10 (2): 129–148. doi:10.1017/S0007123400002064. S2CID 154999006.
- Newburn, Tim (1988). Permission and regulation: Sexual morality and the criminal law in Britain, 1955-75 (PhD thesis). University of Leicester.
- Holland, Geoff (2006). "Drawing the Line—Balancing Religious Vilification Laws and Freedom of Speech" (PDF). UTS Law Review (8). University of Technology Sydney: 9–21.
- Klausen, Jytte (2009). "The Danish Cartoons and Modern Iconoclasm in the Cosmopolitan Muslim Diaspora" (PDF). Harvard Middle Eastern and Islamic Review (8): 86–118.
- Sundholm, John; Thorsen, Isak; Anderssen, Lars Gustaf; Hedling, Olof; Iversen, Gunnar; Møller, Birgir Thor (2012). Historical Dictionary of Scandinavian Cinema. Scarecrow Press. ISBN 9780810878990.
- Larsen, S. E. (2013). "Towards the Blasphemous Self: Constructing Societal Identity in Danish Debates on the Blasphemy Provision in the Twentieth and Twenty-first Centuries". Journal of Ethnic and Migration Studies. 40 (2): 194–211. doi:10.1080/1369183X.2013.851471. S2CID 147112390.
- Stevenson, Jack (2015). "Appendix I: Jens Jørgen Thorsen: The Jesus Chronicles". Scandinavian Blue: The Erotic Cinema of Sweden and Denmark in the 1960s and 1970s. McFarland & Co. pp. 233–246. ISBN 9781476612591.
- Gade, Rune (9 March 2018). "Liderlighedens fædreland—Noter om pornografiens frigivelse og religionsspørgsmålet" [Homeland of Lust—Notes on the Release of Pornography and the Question of Religion]. Slagmark—Tidsskrift for idéhistorie [Battlefield—Journal of the history of ideas] (in Danish) (61): 17–32. doi:10.7146/sl.v0i61.104057.

==== News sources and magazines ====
- "Pope Denounces Film On the 'Loves' of Jesus". The New York Times. 27 August 1973. ProQuest 119829467. Archived from the original on 3 December 2023.
- "Jesus Film Banned". The Los Angeles Times. Reuter. 29 August 1973. p. 5 – via Newspapers.com.
- Rorich, Eric (29 August 1973). "Fire bombs attack over Christ film". The Daily Telegraph. London. p. 3 – via Newspapers.com.
- Frappat, Bruno (30 August 1973). "Une provocation et son écho" [A provocation and its echo]. Le Monde (in French). Paris. ProQuest 2532024538.
- "Attack on Rome Raises a Storm of Protest by Danes". The New York Times. 1 September 1973. ProQuest 119813402. Archived from the original on 3 December 2023.
- "Ban sought on Christ film". Calgary Herald. Reuter. 28 May 1976. p. 15 – via Newspapers.com.
- "Archbishop's Call Rejected". The Vancouver Sun. Agence France-Presse. 2 September 1976. p. 26 – via Newspapers.com.
- Eliaser, Elga (6 September 1976). "Actors eager to be in Jesus sex film, Thorsen claims". The Daily Telegraph. p. 13 – via Newspapers.com.
- "Queen calls proposed film on Jesus obnoxious". The Free Lance-Star. Fredericksburg, Va., U.S. Associated Press. 16 September 1976. p. 30 – via Google News Archive.
- "Queen's beef put down". The Daily Herald-Tribune. Grande Prairie, Alta., Canada. Reuter. 28 September 1976. p. 12 – via Newspapers.com.
- Taylor, Peter (10 October 1976). "How Jesus is shown in porn film". Sunday Telegraph. London. p. 6 – via Newspapers.com.
- "Ivan Lawrence in film controversy". Burton Daily Mail. 25 October 1976. p. 6 – via Newspapers.com.
- "Ban 'Jesus' film with new laws—Wall". Hull Daily Mail. 26 October 1976. p. 5 – via Newspapers.com.
- "Director banned". The Montreal Star. Associated Press. 6 January 1977. p. 22 – via Newspapers.com.
- Knewstub, Nikki (10 February 1977). "Thorsen sent back". The Guardian. London. pp. 1, 20 – via Newspapers.com.
- "Israeli government refuses to allow pornographic film about Jesus". The Catholic Advance. National Catholic News Service. 24 March 1977. p. 7 – via Newspapers.com.
- "Israel Vetoes Jesus Film". St. Louis Jewish Light. Jewish Telegraphic Agency. 30 March 1977. p. 11 – via Newspapers.com.
- "Books: Degustibus non est disputandum". The Philadelphia Inquirer. 15 August 1977. p. 18-C – via Newspapers.com.
- "Star Wars Becomes Endurance Contest". Detroit Free Press. 21 August 1977. p. 19-A – via Newspapers.com.
- Cosford, Bill (2 September 1977). "Theaters' 'Dog Days' Aren't Over; Long Weekend Brings More of Same". The Miami Herald. p. 6C – via Newspapers.com.
- "Lewiston Recording Takes Aim at X-Rated Movie on Christ". The Lewiston Daily Sun. 20 January 1978. p. 19 – via Newspapers.com.
- Hastey, Stan (17 February 1978). "No U.S. Producer Found For Blasphemous Movie". The Leaf-Chronicle. Clarksville, Tenn., U.S. Baptist Press. p. 9 – via Newspapers.com.
- Gallagher, Kathleen (1 March 1978). "Letter Flood Causes Stir Over Jesus Book". The Tennessean. p. 21 – via Newspapers.com.
- "Grove Press Will Not Publish Book on Sex Life of Jesus". Word and Way. Missouri. Baptist Press. 9 March 1978. p. 9 – via Newspapers.com.
- "Canada Bans Mystery Film". Times Colonist. Victoria, B.C., Canada. The Canadian Press. 11 May 1978. p. 27 – via Newspapers.com.
- "Guay doubts existence of controversial film". Star-Phoenix. Saskatoon, Sask., Canada. The Canadian Press. 3 July 1978. p. 7 – via Newspapers.com.
- Simbro, William (18 May 1980). "That Jesus sex movie never existed". The Des Moines Register. pp. 1B–2B – via Newspapers.com.
- Wilson, Jackman (3 June 1980). "A gay Jesus? There'll be no movie". Corvallis Gazette-Times. p. 1 – via Newspapers.com.
- Simbro, William (18 June 1984). "Crusade revives war on non-existent sex film". The Des Moines Register. p. 3A – via Newspapers.com.
- Dean, Wayne (2 December 1989). "Danish Blue: The Jesus Sex Film Scandal". The Sydney Morning Herald. p. 79 – via Newspapers.com.
- Schmidt, Kaare (1992). "Thorsen og kaos" [Thorsen and chaos] (PDF). Kosmorama (in Danish). No. 199. Danish Film Institute. Archived (PDF) from the original on 4 December 2023.
- McNatt, Glenn (21 October 1998). "Protests hotter than play's reviews: Controversy: Demonstrators say Terrence McNally's Corpus Christi is blasphemous; theater critics call it bland". Baltimore Sun. ProQuest 406372670. Archived from the original on 26 November 2023.
- McConnell, Glenn (12 January 2018). "Censor receives complaints about non-existent film depicting Christ as gay". Stuff. Archived from the original on 26 November 2023.

==== Other sources ====
- Thorsen, Jens Jørgen (1975). Thorsens Jesusfilm: en uforkortet overættelse til dansk ved forfatteren [Thorsen's Jesus Film: An Unabridged Translation into Danish by the Author] (in Danish). Copenhagen: Borgen. ISBN 8741835247.
- Mikkelson, Barbara (17 January 2017) [April 21, 2000]. "Will Jesus Be Portrayed as Homosexual in an Upcoming Film?". Snopes. Archived from the original on 26 November 2023.
