= List of works depicting Jesus as LGBTQ =

Artistic works that depict Jesus as LGBTQ

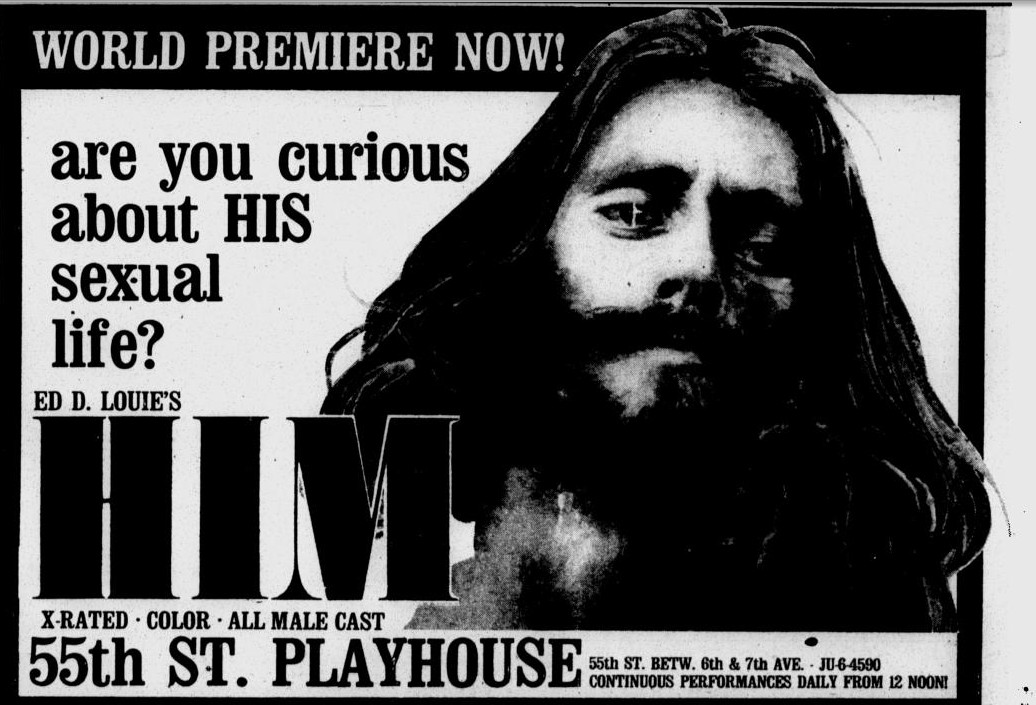
Advertisement in The Village Voice magazine in 1974 for the film Him

A number of artistic works have depicted Jesus as LGBTQ or involved in same-sex romantic or sexual relationships. Jesus' sexuality is a topic of significant academic discussion.

== Films and screenplays ==
- The Many Faces of Jesus, also called The Sex Life of Jesus and The Love Affairs of Jesus, a 1973 pornographic screenplay by Jens Jørgen Thorsen that depicted Jesus in sex acts with both men and women. After outcry and government intervention in multiple countries, Thorsen abandoned plans at producing the film, instead making a less explicit film, The Return, in 1992.
  - Thorsens Jesusfilm, a 1975 Danish book translating the screenplay.
- Him, a lost 1974 gay pornographic film by Ed D. Louie.
- Jesus – The Film, a 1986 West German experimental film which depicts Jesus as gay.
- The First Temptation of Christ, a 2019 satirical comedy by Porta dos Fundos in which Jesus is depicted as having a boyfriend.

=== See also ===
- Corpus Christi: Playing with Redemption, a 2011 documentary about the play Corpus Christi, but not itself a depiction of Jesus as LGBTQ.
- The gay Jesus film hoax, a long-running chain letter that claims that a film will soon be released depicting Jesus as gay, initially related to The Many Faces of Jesus and later including references to Corpus Christi.

== Literary works ==
- "The Love That Dares to Speak Its Name", a 1976 poem by James Kirkup published in Gay News, which led to a successful private prosecution by Mary Whitehouse for blasphemy.
- Jesus in Love: A Novel (2006) and Jesus in Love: At the Cross (2008), novels by Kittredge Cherry depicting Jesus as a bisexual, transgender, gender-fluid erotic mystic.
- "Dayspring", a 2019 short story by Anthony Oliveira which describes the events of the gospels from the perspective of the disciple whom Jesus loved.
  - Dayspring, a 2024 novel by Oliveira adapting the short story.

== Music ==
- "Gay Messiah", a 2004 song by Rufus Wainwright from the album Want Two, which depicts a Second Coming wherein Jesus is "reborn / from 1970s porn" as the titular gay messiah.

== Photography ==
- Elisabeth Ohlson Wallin's Ecce Homo (1998) consisted of depictions of Jesus in a LGBTQ context.

== Stage ==
- Corpus Christi, a 1997 play depicting Jesus as a gay man from Corpus Christi, Texas, who is murdered for being gay.
- The Gospel According to Jesus, Queen of Heaven, a 2009 monologue written by Jo Clifford, depicts Jesus as a trans woman. A Portuguese translation by Natalia Mallo was performed in 2014 by Renata Carvalho.
- The performer Heath V. Salazar has played the drag king persona Gay Jesus since 2016.
