= Gay Jesus film hoax =

"Modern People News has revealed plans for the filming of a movie based on the SEX LIFE OF JESUS in which Jesus is portrayed as a swinging HOMOSEXUAL. ..."

— An early version of the chain letter

Since around 1979, a chain letter has falsely claimed that a film is in the works in which Jesus will be depicted as gay and involved in a promiscuous swinger lifestyle. (Note: While films have existed that depict Jesus as gay or bisexual, including Him and The First Temptation of Christ, none exist as described in the chain letter. Corpus Christi: Playing with Redemption is a documentary about the play Corpus Christi, not an adaptation, and in either case the play is not a sexualized depiction.) Born of half-truths regarding The Many Faces of Jesus, Jens Jørgen Thorsen's abandoned pornographic film about Jesus, the hoax initially implied that the film's would-be producer was a magazine that had run a poll about Thorsen's plans. The narrative has morphed over time to claim that the supposed film is an adaptation of the 1997 play Corpus Christi, which does depict Jesus as gay, although not in a sexualized manner.

Many letters have directed recipients to contact the attorney general of Illinois to demand a ban of the supposed film, peaking at roughly 2,000 letters per week. In 1985, Attorney General Neil Hartigan wrote a letter to advice columnist Ann Landers asking for her help in publicizing the film's nonexistence. Entities to fall for the hoax in subsequent decades include the county council of Pictou County, Nova Scotia. Forty-seven years after its inception, the hoax persists as of 2026, now spread on Facebook. Film regulators across the globe have received complaints as recently as 2018.

== Background ==
The sexuality of Jesus has long been the topic of both theological and popular speculation. The 1974 gay pornographic film Him depicts Jesus as gay, but was extremely obscure, and Snopes views it as very unlikely that it influenced the emergence of the hoax.

The 1970s saw a massive letter-writing campaign seeking Christians' assistance in preventing a fictitious attempt by atheist activist Madalyn Murray O'Hair to ban religious content on television. In reality, O'Hair was involved in no such effort and the Federal Communications Commission terminated an investigation into religious programming on educational networks.

Around the same time, Danish director Jens Jørgen Thorsen's plans to produce The Many Faces of Jesus, a pornographic movie about Jesus, caused outcry in Denmark, the United Kingdom, and several other countries. After being denied entry to the United Kingdom, Thorsen tried to produce the film in the United States or to publish the screenplay as a book. Outrage grew among Baptists, partly due to an incorrect statement by a prominent pastor that the film was under production in the United States. This prompted letters to Grove Press, to which Thorsen had submitted the book, and to Senator Mark Hatfield, requesting legislation to censor the book. Hatfield, also a Baptist, responded that neither Congress nor president Jimmy Carter had the power to prevent the film's production. He instead directed letter-writers toward Grove, which later said that the book had already been rejected and was never seriously considered. Publisher Barney Rosset cited "aesthetic grounds" for the rejection.

== Modern People News ==
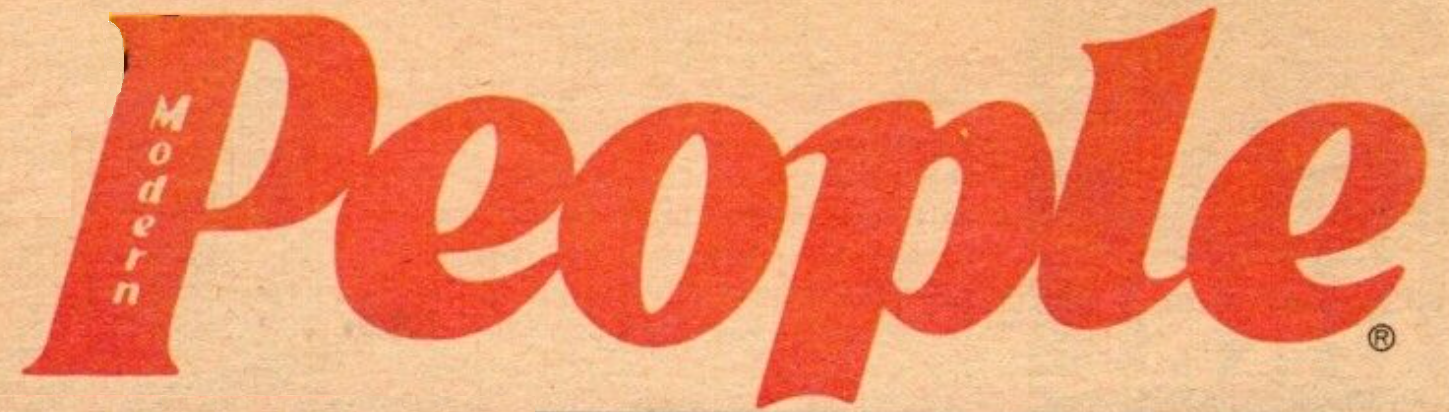
Modern People News was a weekly magazine based in Franklin, Illinois.

In 1977, Modern People Productions of Franklin, Illinois, reported on Thorsen's plans in its weekly magazine, Modern People News. (Modern People Productions would later say that the article was reprinted from an unnamed other publication.) Four months later, Modern People News reported that the tentative plans had been dropped, and gave the results of a poll that had been included with the first article: 99% of respondents opposed a production. According to a manager of Modern People News, they forwarded the negative responses to the potential film's producers, which she speculated may have played a role in the decision to not go forward. Two years later, however, Modern People Productions—which had never itself expressed any intention to make the film—began to receive new messages of protest, often assuming that it was the would-be producer.

In 1980, The Des Moines Register traced the spread of a chain letter throughout Iowa, a letter from the Woman's Christian Temperance Union's "venerable—and embarrassed" national office to its Iowa chapters, to pastors and some lay members of the Churches of Christ in Iowa, to a prayer chain in Des Moines. Recipients used mimeographs to send the same unsigned letter onward. A representative example reads (spelling and grammar errors sic):

Modern People News has revealed plans for the filming of a movie based on the SEX LIFE OF JESUS in which Jesus is portrayed as a swinging HOMOSEXUAL. This film will be shot in the U.S.A. this year unless the public outcry is great. Already a French Prostitute has been named to play the part of Mary Magdalene, with who Christ has a blatant affair. We CANNOT AFFORD to standby and DO NOTHING about this disgrace. We must not allow this perveted world to drag our Lord through the dirt. PLEASE HELP us to get this film banned from the U.S.A. as it has been in Europe. Let us show how we feel.

"We're getting hundreds of calls, thousands of letters. Oh, God, I'm all tired out."

— An employee of Modern People Productions

An early version included a form to be sent to the "Jesus Sex Film Poll" at Modern People News—by then out of print. The small publication received thousands of letters and created a form letter with which to reply, but was overwhelmed by the volume. The letter closed with a plea to explain the confusion to others.

Not all devout Christians were credulous. Christianity Today, the main publication of the evangelical movement, debunked the hoax in 1980. The Register the same year described a Des Moines pastor who read in a religious publication that it was a hoax and explained this to a parishioner who gave him a copy of the chain letter. Charles Loise, a pastor from Salem, Oregon, who fact-checked the claims with the National Association of Evangelicals, told the Statesman Journal that "It is unfortunate that we as Christians are so gullible, or perhaps I should say naïve".

== Letters to attorneys general ==
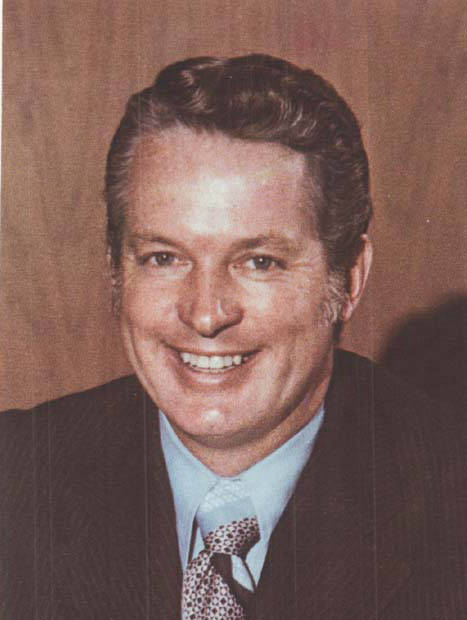
William J. Scott, the intended recipient of most of the letters, was in federal prison during the time that many were sent.

The chain letter evolved to call for writing to state attorneys general. Recipients were encouraged to tear out a form letter, make copies for their friends, and send it to the attorney general of Illinois, or in some versions the attorney general of Alabama. The Alabama letters also often included a claim—attributed to evangelist Jimmy Swaggart—that the film had been completed and was due for release during the Christmas season.

In 1980, Illinois attorney general William J. Scott began to receive letters demanding that he ban the non-existent film. Scott was removed from office that year upon conviction for tax fraud, but his successors, Tyrone C. Fahner and Neil Hartigan, continued to receive the same letters, mostly addressed to Scott, even after Modern People Productions went out of business around 1982. Most letters came from the Bible Belt and Western United States. Mail came at a rate of around 1,000 per week in 1980, reaching 2,000 by late 1983, consuming about 3 person-hours a day to process.

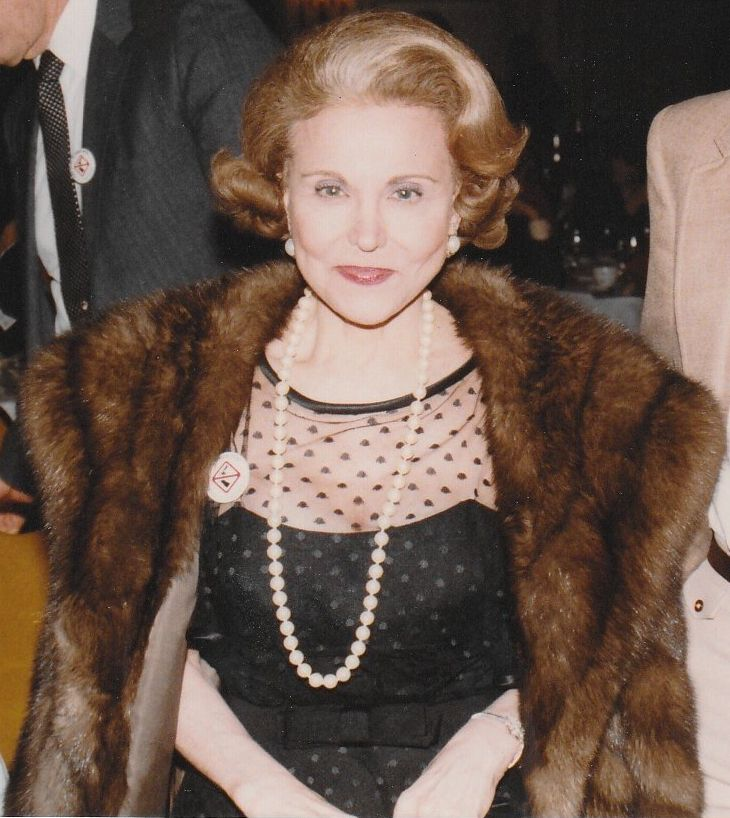
Eppie Lederer, who wrote as Ann Landers from 1955 to 2002

In January 1985, Hartigan wrote to the Chicago-based syndicated advice columnist Ann Landers, explaining that his office was receiving "approximately 1,000 protests a week" and that the matter was "distressing hundreds and thousands of Christians and those of other faiths as well" from "41 states, Canada, Puerto Rico, New Zealand, Australia, Cambodia, Spain, Brazil, the Dominican Republic, India, the Philippines, Guatemala, Costa Rica, and Portugal". He asked Landers for her help spreading the word that the film did not in fact exist. Landers replied that "Hoaxes die hard, and the zanier the hoax, the more difficult it is to try to convince people that it is not true". She advised readers not to believe the hoax and said (incorrectly (Note: As Landers would correctly state in a later column about a different chain letter, chain letters are only illegal in the United States if they involve a promise of remuneration, in which case they are considered illegal lotteries.)) that chain letters were illegal.

== Subsequent spread and Corpus Christi ==
The county council of Pictou County in Nova Scotia, Canada, which had banned Thorsen's never-produced film in the 1980s, voted unanimously in 1996 to condemn the never-planned Modern People News–produced film. Jim Ryan, the fifth Illinois attorney general of the gay Jesus film hoax era, rebutted the film's existence, and a local group called the Homosexualist Agenda invited the council to a workshop on homophobia. A councillor argued in response that the resolution was not homophobic.

Terrence McNally's 1997 play Corpus Christi (lit. 'body of Christ'), first staged in 1998, depicts Jesus as gay, although not in a sexualized manner. Protests by Christians led multiple theaters to cancel performances of the play. The hoax chain letter, by then distributed by e-mail as well as the post, came to reference Corpus Christi, sometimes as a "play that went on for a while", sometimes by name. A version of the e-mail quoted in 2012 begins (grammatical and typographical errors sic):

The movie Corpus Christi is due to be released this June to August. Let's stand for what we believe in and stop the mockery of Jesus Christ our Saviour. If the Muslims do what they believe to be right when films or mockery appears against their religion , where do we stand as Christians?

This disgusting film set to appear in America later this year and it depicts Jesus and his disciples as homosexuals! As a play, this has already been in theatres for a while. It's called Corpus Christi ' which means 'The Christ Body.' It's a revolting mockery of our Lord. But, we can make a difference. That's why I am sending this e-mail to you. If you do send this around, we may be able to prevent this film from showing in America and South Africa .

(While the film Corpus Christi: Playing with Redemption was released in 2011 in relation to the play, it is a documentary about the play's history, not an adaptation of its narrative.)

Complaints about a supposed Corpus Christi adaptation have continued worldwide. In 2002, South Africa's Film and Publication Board, having received two complaints and fearing a greater influx, released a statement saying that they were not aware of any such film. In 2012, Craig Lapper of the British Board of Film Classification said that the hoax had been a "constant issue" over the decades, with the board receiving six complaints in 2011 and two in 2012. In 2014, a Christian minister who served as the affirmative action officer for Schenectady County, New York, used his work email to forward a chain email about the fictitious Corpus Christi film. Another minister, who called the email "biased" and "inappropriate", reported him to county officials for the email, leading to an internal investigation. In 2018, an official at New Zealand's Office of Film and Literature Classification said that they received complaints every few years to ban screenings of the non-existent film in the country. In 2025, Africa Check observed the hoax's longevity, enough to merit a Wikipedia article, and described a new iteration of the hoax spreading on Facebook. New iterations in Africa falsely describe gay Brazilian politician Jean Wyllys as the film's director; some use the poster for the unrelated 2019 film Corpus Christi as supposed evidence of the film's existence. Africa Check noted that Wyllys was, at the time, working on a PhD in fake news.

== See also ==
- List of spurious works of fiction – Fictional works not confirmed to exist
- Jesus – The Film, a 1986 experimental feature film depicting Jesus as gay
- The First Temptation of Christ, a 2019 comedy depicting Jesus as gay, which led to a large petition in protest and the firebombing of its creators' office
- Piss Christ, a 1987 photograph that led to complaints by Christians
- Innocence of Muslims, an anti-Muslim film that drew worldwide protests in 2012

== Notes and references ==
=== Sources ===
- "Chain Letters". United States Postal Inspection Service. n.d. Archived from the original on May 8, 2012.
- Hastey, Stan (February 17, 1978). "No U.S. Producer Found For Blasphemous Movie". The Leaf-Chronicle. Clarksville, Tenn., U.S. Baptist Press. p. 9 – via Newspapers.com.
- Gallagher, Kathleen (March 1, 1978). "Letter Flood Causes Stir Over Jesus Book". The Tennessean. p. 21 – via Newspapers.com.
- "Grove Press Will Not Publish Book on Sex Life of Jesus". Word and Way. Missouri. Baptist Press. March 9, 1978. p. 9.
- Simbro, William (May 18, 1980). "That Jesus sex movie never existed". The Des Moines Register. pp. 1B–2B – via Newspapers.com.
- Wilson, Jackman (June 3, 1980). "A gay Jesus? There'll be no movie". Corvallis Gazette-Times. p. 1 – via Newspapers.com.
- Maust, John (June 27, 1980). "'Conscientious Objectors' See No Relief in Women Elders Conflict". Christianity Today. p. 56.
- Arends, Lewis H. Jr. (August 2, 1980). "Churchman chases rumors, labels 'gay Jesus' film hoax". Statesman Journal. Salem, Ore. p. 2E – via Newspapers.com.
- Simbro, William (June 18, 1984). "Crusade revives war on non-existent sex film". The Des Moines Register. p. 3A – via Newspapers.com.
- Landers, Ann (January 20, 1985). "Rumor of film on gay Jesus a hoax". Ask Ann Landers. The Atlanta Journal. p. 6-ZG – via Newspapers.com.
- Landers, Ann (August 26, 1996). "A Chain of Men?". Ask Ann Landers. Sun Sentinel. Ft. Lauderdale, Fla.
- "County trying to protect Jesus from slander on film". Nanaimo Daily News. The Canadian Press. December 4, 1996. p. 2B – via Newspapers.com.
- "Council urged to get counselling". Nanaimo Daily News. The Canadian Press. January 8, 1997. p. A10 – via Newspapers.com.
- McNatt, Glenn (October 21, 1998). "Protests hotter than play's reviews: Controversy: Demonstrators say Terrence McNally's Corpus Christi is blasphemous; theater critics call it bland". Baltimore Sun.
- "Gay Jesus film non-existent". News24. South Africa. July 24, 2002.
- "'Gay Jesus' Film Corpus Christi Sparks Complaints—Even Though It Doesn't Exist". HuffPost UK. Press Association. December 26, 2012.
- Nelson, Paul (May 15, 2014). "Schenectady County eyes worker's anti-gay email about hoax Jesus film". Times Union. Albany, N.Y.
- Mikkelson, Barbara (January 17, 2017) [April 21, 2000]. "Will Jesus Be Portrayed as Homosexual in an Upcoming Film?". Snopes.
- McConnell, Glenn (January 12, 2018). "Censor receives complaints about non-existent film depicting Christ as gay". Stuff. New Zealand.
- Cosser, Kirsten (March 4, 2025). "No 'Gay Jesus' film: the Frankenstein hoax that keeps on giving". Africa Check.
