= Death erection =

Postmortem erection often found in those executed by hanging

A death erection, angel lust, rigor erectus, or terminal erection is a post-mortem erection, technically a priapism, observed in the corpses of men who have been executed, particularly by hanging.

== Overview ==
The phenomenon has been attributed to pressure on the cerebellum created by the noose. Spinal cord injuries are known to be associated with priapism. Injuries to the cerebellum or spinal cord are often associated with priapism in living patients.

Death by hanging, whether an execution or a suicide, has been observed to affect the genitals of both men and women. In women, the labia and clitoris may become engorged and there may be a discharge of blood from the vagina while in men, "a more or less complete state of erection of the penis, with discharge of urine, mucus or prostatic fluid is a frequent occurrence ... present for one in three cases." Other causes of death may also result in these effects, including fatal gunshots to the head, damage to major blood vessels, and violent death by poisoning. A postmortem priapism is an indicator that death was likely swift and violent.

== In popular culture ==
- In The Sexuality of Christ in Renaissance Art and in Modern Oblivion, art historian and critic Leo Steinberg alleges that several Renaissance-era artists depicted Jesus Christ with an emphasis on his genitalia—including after the crucifixion with a post-mortem erection—a motif which Steinberg named ostentatio genitalium. The artwork was suppressed by the Roman Catholic Church for several centuries.
- The "Cyclops" section of James Joyce's Ulysses makes multiple uses of the terminal erection as a motif.
- In The Decline and Fall of the Roman Empire, Edward Gibbon relates an anecdote attributed to Abulfeda that Ali, on the death of Muhammad, exclaimed, O propheta, certe penis tuus cælum versus erectus est (O prophet, thy penis is erect unto the sky). This understanding of the anecdote, however, is based on a mistranslation of the Arabic source by John Gagnier, who translated Abulfeda's Life of Muhammad into Latin. The English translation of the Arabic source should read: "In one account, ʿAlī, may God be best pleased with him, was called upon, while he was washing him [the Prophet], to raise his gaze to the sky."
- This phenomenon is a recurring theme in the writing of William S. Burroughs, appearing in many of his books including Naked Lunch and Cities of the Red Night.

== See also ==
- Lazarus sign
- Livor mortis
- Ostentatio genitalium
