= Michael Tracey =

Michael Tracey may refer to:

- Michael Tracey (commentator), an American commentator
- Michael Tracey (producer), a British-American academic, mostly known for his involvement in the JonBenét Ramsey case
- Tracy 168, name used by Michael Tracy, a graffiti artist
