= Spectator Index =

Popular news account on Twitter

The Spectator Index is the name of a popular Twitter account and website run by Abdul-Latif Halimi, a doctor from Melbourne, Australia. Its Twitter account has over 3 million followers.

== History ==
Started in 2013 as The International Spectator using the Twitter handle @INTLSpectator, the account described itself as a “new online magazine website, offering analysis and insight into the world’s international political, economic, scientific, cultural and entertainment developments". The site rebranded as the Spectator Index on 31 December 2016 due to a conflict with an Italian foreign affairs magazine also called the International Spectator. The site also has no connection to The Spectator, a British magazine.

== Criticism ==
In 2017, the website Africa Check reported that the Spectator Index tweeted false statistics about the frequency of rapes committed in South Africa. Africa Check also reported that the Spectator Index had misreported the suicide rate in Nigeria.

== Ownership ==
In an investigation published by the New Statesman, journalist Henry Dyer found that the account was owned by Australian doctor Abdul-Latif Halimi after looking at the Australian business filings of the Spectator Index. The New Statesman reported that Halimi is "well connected with the devout practising Muslim world, those who consider themselves to be traditionalists". Halimi did not respond to requests for an interview from Dyer.
