= Corpus Christi (play) =

Play by Terrence McNally

- Original language: English
- Written by: Terrence McNally in 1997

Premiere
- Date: New York City, 1998

Corpus Christi is a 1998 American play by Terrence McNally, written in 1997 and first staged in New York in 1998, dramatizing the story of Jesus and the Apostles, depicting Jesus and the Apostles as gay men living in modern-day Texas. McNally arranges the narrative through anachronisms that represent Roman occupation.

== Character list ==
The play was written for 13 male actors, all of which will play a variety of roles except Joshua and Judas.

- Joshua – represents Jesus
- John – a writer, brother to James
  - Also plays: Angry Man in motel, Dub Taylor, Hypocrite, Simon of Cyrenae
- James – a teacher
  - Also plays: Woman Next Door in motel, Jimmy, Little Boy
- Peter – a young man who sells fish
  - Also plays: Mary, Spider Sloan
- Andrew – a masseur
  - Also plays: Man Next Door in motel, Bert Moody, Pilate's Wife
- Philip – a hustler
  - Also plays: Joseph, Mrs. McElroy, Carpenter, Pontius Pilate
- Bartholomew – a doctor and James’ lover
  - Also plays: Motel Manager, Peggy Powell, Nun
- Judas Iscariot – a restaurateur
- Matthew – a lawyer
  - Also plays: Frightened Woman in motel, Priest, High Priest, Philistine
- Thomas – an actor
  - Also plays: Room Service #3, Sister Joseph, Patricia, Lazarus, Soldier
- James the Less – an architect
  - Also plays: God, Billy Brown, Poor Woman
- Simon – a singer
  - Also plays: Room Service #1
- Thaddeus – a hairdresser
  - Also plays: Room Service #2, Roman Centurion, Barrabas

== Stage design ==
The stage is very minimal with benches upstage for the characters to sit on while not participating in a scene. When the actors enter and exit scenes, they simply step forward to the stage or backward to the benches. The play was written with only two design elements in mind— a small pool of water and a fire, both on the stage floor.

== Synopsis ==
The audience meets each character at the very beginning of the play after each is baptized by the character John. After each baptism, the actor speaks directly to the audience to give a description of their character. In this scene, Joshua is told by John he is the Son of God, and then Joshua baptizes John. The next scene is a description of Mary birthing Joshua in a motel which begins and ends with the actors singing lyrics of modern-day Christmas songs. The play cuts rapidly between conversations amongst the characters at the motel where God eventually speaks to Joshua to direct him and tell him what will happen in his life.

Next, the characters move quickly through different settings of high school, focusing on prom where Joshua wins the superlative "Most Likely to Take it Up the Hershey Highway." Then, Joshua and Judas kiss in the boys' bathroom and later make out on the beach. The next day Joshua begins to wander and travel. He hitches a ride with a blind truck driver and Joshua heals him of leprosy and heals his eyes so that he can see. The truck driver kicks Joshua out so that he can help the world with his powers.

The next scene first takes place with Joshua in the desert, representing the Bible story of Jesus' 40 days and nights spent in the desert. Then, Joshua finds his way into the city where he performs the many miracles that Jesus is capable of. After these miracles, all twelve actors stand together to represent the twelve disciples. Joshua goes on to marry James and Bartholomew to each other because no one else would. McNally emphasizes here that Joshua chose to focus on the love aspect of scripture rather than the judgement aspect.

They all return to Corpus Christi to act out the Last Supper and then Joshua's crucifixion. Judas betrays Joshua and turns him in to Pontius Pilate. The disciples then act as the city's people and vote to save the life of Barabbas the thief and have Joshua crucified for being gay. For the crucifixion, Thaddeus nails the first nail, Matthew nails the second and third nails that pin Joshua to the cross. From the crowd, some disciples mock Joshua and accuse him of not being the Son of God because he is being murdered for being gay. This scene is gruesome to emphasize the pain that hate causes.

Similar to the beginning, the play ends with the actors addressing the audience to provide an explanation. They state that Joshua, in reference to Jesus, loved everyone despite their potential sins.

== Reception ==
The play received critical attention for its exploration of gay themes in Christianity. It was also condemned by Catholic League, a Roman Catholic watchdog group, for what they viewed as blasphemy, sacrilege, and anti-Christian bigotry. The play was subsequently cited in chain letters that falsely claimed it would be adapted as a film, part of a hoax that predated the play.

== Productions ==
The planned production of the play in New York City was canceled and then reinstated. Because of protests, the producer of the play, the Manhattan Theatre Club, withdrew the play in May 1998, worried about possible violence. They then quickly reinstated it, stating that they did not believe in censorship but also noting that security precautions would be taken. The play opened Off-Broadway in a Manhattan Theatre Club production at New York City Center Stage 1 on October 13, 1998, directed by Joe Mantello, and closed on November 29, 1998. The original production featured the following cast:

- Joshua – Anson Mount
- John – Michael Irby
- James – Sean Dugan
- Peter – Michael Hall
- Andrew – Greg Zola
- Philip – Matthew Mabe
- Bartholomew – Jeremy Shamos
- Judas Iscariot – Josh Lucas
- Matthew – Drew McVety
- Thomas – Christopher Fitzgerald
- James the Less – Ken Leung
- Simon – Ben Sheaffer
- Thaddeus – Troy Sostillio

Corpus Christi received its British premiere in 2000, produced by Theatre 28 and directed by Stephen Henry. When it was produced as part of the Sydney Gay and Lesbian Mardi Gras, Anglican bishop Robert Forsyth considered the play to be offensive and historically incorrect.

A 2004 production at University of St. Andrews in Scotland, staged while Prince William, The Duke of Cambridge was still a student there, received much attention and was protested daily by radical conservative group Christian Voice, who lodged complaints with local police to prevent performances from going ahead on claims of blasphemy. This same production later traveled to the Edinburgh Fringe Festival.

The play was revived by the Off-Off-Broadway Rattlestick Playwrights Theater, running in October 2008. Jason Zinoman, reviewing for The New York Times, wrote that the premiere production was "an earnest and reverent spin on the Jesus story, with some soft-spoken, gay-friendly politics thrown in." He further noted that the play was "fragile, heartfelt" and "seems more personal than political, a coming-of-age story wrapped in religious sentiment." The New York Times also published an article linking the uproar in 1998 to the death of gay student Matthew Shepard.

In March 2010, a student performance of the play was cancelled at Tarleton State University in Stephenville, Texas. The university had received many complaints about the play's scheduled performance, but its president, F. Dominic Dottavio, citing freedom of speech, declared that the play would be performed. Dottavio's condemnation of the play in the same letter, though, has been criticized by campus free speech groups as giving encouragement to people trying to shut down the production. After Texas's Lieutenant Governor David Dewhurst weighed in saying, "No one should have the right to use government funds or institutions to portray acts that are morally reprehensible to the vast majority of Americans," the performance was cancelled citing safety concerns.

The planned staging of the play in Athens, Greece, in October 2012 led to violent protests by party members and clergymen, with journalists and audience members being banned in the theater, and the premiere was cancelled. An Off West End production took place at the Arcola Theatre in London UK, March 2018 as part of the Creative Disruption Festival.

== Documentary film ==
A film about the staging of the play and its reception, titled Corpus Christi: Playing with Redemption, was released in 2011. It was previewed at the Atlanta Film Festival on May 7, 2011.

== See also ==
- List of works depicting Jesus as LGBT
- Mystery play
- Sexuality of Jesus

== Sources ==
- Eyre, Richard and Nicholas Wright. 2000. Changing Stages: A View of British Theatre in the Twentieth Century. London: Bloomsbury. ISBN 0-7475-4789-0
- McNally, Terrence. 1999. Corpus Christi. New York: Grove. ISBN 0-8021-3635-4
