= Him (1974 film) =

1974 lost pornographic film by Ed Lui

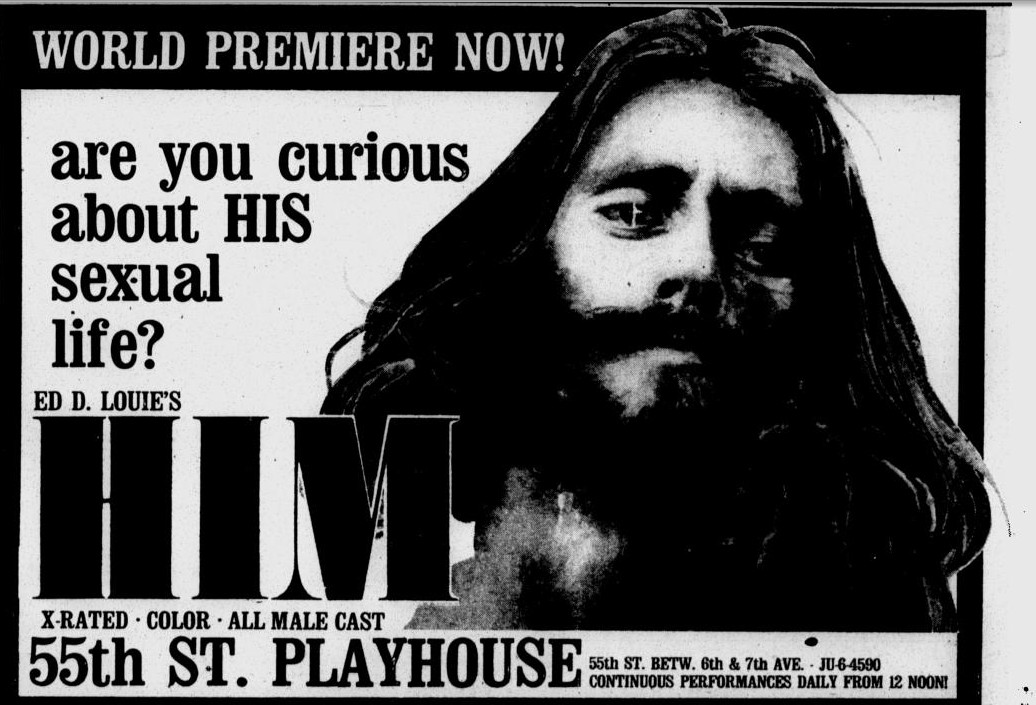
- Advertisement in The Village Voice magazine in 1974
- Directed by: Ed Lui (credited as Ed D. Louie)
- Starring: Gustav "Tava" Von Will
- Distributed by: Hand in Hand Films
- Release date: 27 March 1974
- Country: United States
- Language: English

Him is a lost 1974 American gay pornographic film directed by Ed Lui (credited under the pseudonym "Ed D. Louie") and distributed by Hand in Hand Films. The plot follows a young gay man who develops an erotic fixation on Jesus Christ, played by mural artist Gustav "Tava" Von Will. After premiering at the 55th Street Playhouse in March 1974, it received mixed reviews, including a notice from Variety calling it "brazen". Him gained lasting notoriety when it was included in Michael Medved and Harry Medved's 1980 book The Golden Turkey Awards. As of 2026, no copies of the film are known to survive.

== Plot ==
A young gay man, (Note: The name of the "young gay man" is unknown.) in contemporary America, develops an erotic fixation on Jesus Christ which will help him understand the hidden meaning of the Gospels. The young man confesses his desire to a priest in the confessional, saying "I keep having these dreams where I'm having sex with Jesus." He says this while the priest masturbates. After he ejaculates, the priest says "My son, everyone is allowed to have their own fantasy." Near the end, Jesus is first seen naked carrying a cross past the Pan-Am Building in Manhattan. The young man finally meets Jesus, and then has sexual intercourse with him.

== Production ==
Little is known about the production of Him. It was distributed by Hand in Hand Films, and was directed by Ed Lui, a multidisciplinary bisexual artist, under the alias "Ed D. Louie". He is the nephew of the 55th Street Playhouse owner Frank Lee. Wakefield Poole, an adult filmmaker who made the 1971 gay porn Boys in the Sand, said in an interview that he "clearly remembered" Ed D. Louie, and repudiated online speculation that "Ed D. Louie" was a pseudonym for noted B-movie director Edward D. Wood Jr. The actor who played Jesus was Gustav Von Will, an Austrian muralist who is better known under the alias "Tava". He was first publicly identified in July 2012 by New York artist Vinny Parrillo. Parrillo also shared a production still from Him, showing a naked Tava carrying the cross as Jesus. Tava died in 1991 from AIDS-related complications.

== Release and reception ==
Him premiered on 27 March 1974 at the 55th Street Playhouse at 154 West 55th Street in New York City. (Note: Most sources say the film premiered on 27 March, however Hall 2021 said it premiered on 28 March.) This run lasted until 23 May 1974. It returned to the Playhouse in December 1974, and January 1976. The film also played at the Bijou Theater in Chicago, the Nob Hill Theatre in San Francisco, the Sansom Cinema in Philadelphia, the Gay Paree Theatre in Atlanta, the Wood-Six Twin Theater in Highland Park, the David Theatre in New York City, and the Penthouse Theater in Pittsburgh. According to Corey Sinclair of the Star Observer, Him was also screened in Canada, Spain, and Scandinavia. It was never released on home media. Advertisements for Him touted it as an "X-rated" color movie with an "all-male cast".

=== Initial reception ===
Him received a mixed reception from critics. In the April 17, 1974, issue of Variety, they described Him as being "brazen". Variety also noted that it "seems to be the first pic to actually depict Chirst [sic] engaged in sexual acts, and in homosexual acts to boot." Also on April 17, David Tipmore of The Village Voice said when compared to the religious pornographic film Bible! by Wakefield Poole, "Him is bad religious raunch." It received a positive review in the April 29, 1974, issue of Screw magazine by Al Goldstein, who was shocked by the film's extreme content despite his experience reviewing adult movies. Goldstein described the film as a "hymn to sodomy and the other brazen activities that mark the twilight world of perversity with so much pain and prurience," despite the low budget and "mismatched editing". On May 13, 1974, Time wrote an article about the decline of adult movie theaters and films in the genre, which briefly mentioned Him. A snippet of their article was used in an advertisement for Him in The Village Voice. In July 1975, James Martin of Hustler gave Him a "half-erect," or two out of four rating, calling it "one of the better-made male-for-male films."

=== Legacy ===
In 1980, American film critics Michael Medved and his brother Harry Medved drew attention to the film in their book about cataloging films considered the worst, The Golden Turkey Awards. Writer Andrew Sullivan of The Atlantic said if it were not for the Medveds, the film would have "probably been forgotten". The Golden Turkey Awards gave it the award for "Most Un-Erotic Concept in Pornography". The Medveds were very negative in their review, criticizing the advertisement used for the film and the tagline of "Are You Curious about HIS Sexual Life?" They also said "For sheer tastelessness, this film has no equals", although it is unclear if they went to a gay porn theater to see the film or if they based their summary on the scattered media reports already in circulation. Due to the book challenging the reader to find a single non-existent film, online commentators attempted to debunk Him as a hoax. The actual hoax entry was Dog of Norway, a fictitious film illustrated with a photograph of the Medveds' pet dog. The same dog was featured on the cover of the book with the authors.

In the 21st century, Him has been suggested as an origin for the gay Jesus film hoax which circulated in the 1980s, although Snopes found this claim "hard to imagine" given the film's obscurity. In 2010, an anonymous blogger known as "Captain Obscurity" launched a Blogger page that provided an in-depth investigation of the film's history. In 2017, Irish academic (Note: Sources differ on their occupation.) Jack Holman self-published an essay titled "Why Are They Talking About 'Him'?" The document was designed to collect all publicly-available information about the film. As of 2026, no extant copies of Him have been located, making it a lost film. In 2007, online magazine Film Threat cited it among the most sought-after lost films.

== See also ==
- The Many Faces of Jesus – 1973 screenplay and abandoned film about Jesus engaging in homosexual and heterosexual activity
- List of lost films
- List of works depicting Jesus as LGBT

== Bibliography ==
- Medved, Harry; Medved, Michael (1980). The Golden Turkey Awards: Nominees and Winners, The Worst Achievements in Hollywood History. NY: Perigee Books. ISBN 9780399504631.
- Campbell, Richard H.; Pitts, Michael R. (1981). The Bible on film: a checklist, 1897-1980. Metuchen, N.J: Scarecrow Press. ISBN 978-0-8108-1473-8.
- Malone, Peter (2012). Screen Jesus: Portrayals of Christ in Television and Film. Lanham: Scarecrow Press, Inc. ISBN 978-0-8108-8389-5.
- Hall, Phil (2016). In Search of Lost Films. Albany, Georgia: BearManor Media. ISBN 978-1-59393-938-0.
- Hall, Phil (2021a). Jesus Christ Movie Star. BearManor Media. ISBN 9781629336985.
