= Dry Wind =

2020 Brazilian drama film

- Portuguese: Vento seco
- Directed by: Daniel Nolasco
- Written by: Daniel Nolasco
- Produced by: Daniel Nolasco; Lidiana Reis
- Starring: Leandro Faria Lelo; Allan Jacinto Santana; Rafael Theophilo; Renata Carvalho
- Cinematography: Larry Machado
- Edited by: Will Domingos
- Music by: Natalia Petrutes
- Production companies: Estudio Giz; Panaceia Films
- Distributed by: TLA Releasing
- Release date: February 26, 2020 (Berlin)
- Running time: 110 minutes
- Country: Brazil
- Language: Portuguese

Dry Wind (Portuguese: Vento seco) is a Brazilian drama film, directed by Daniel Nolasco and released in 2020. The film stars Leandro Faria Lelo as Sandro, a shy, middle-aged gay factory worker in a small town in Goiás who initiates a casual sexual hookup with his co-worker Ricardo (Allan Jacinto Santana), only to become consumed with jealousy when Maicon (Rafael Theophilo) subsequently arrives in town and becomes a rival for Ricardo's affections.

The film premiered in the Panorama section at the 70th Berlin International Film Festival.

== Critical response ==
Jessica Kiang of Variety wrote that "Tom of Finland has a lot to answer for. His gorgeously lurid illustrations of bulging male musculature, tumescent crotches, extravagant mustaches and granite jawlines not only defined the iconography for a joyously irreverent gay subculture that had previously been given little expression, it also established a hypermasc gay dreamboat ideal that derives a lot of its power from its sheer unattainability. That gap, between everyday reality and oiled, leather-daddy fantasy certainly tortures Sandro (Leandro Faria Lelo), the central character of Dry Wind, and if it’s one that Daniel Nolasco’s offbeat, mischievous, explicit debut also cannot quite bridge, damned if it doesn’t have a good XXX-rated go at it."

For Metro Weekly, Doug Rule wrote that "Dry Wind would benefit from greater character development and growth as well as refinements in plot. Yet as is, it’s exactly the kind of film that any other year would have packed in — and pleased — festivalgoers at a late-night theater screening. But even a solitary viewing of it at home makes one appreciate Larry Machado’s gorgeously rendered, vivid cinematography, which helps ensure Dry Wind is as visually stunning as it is erotically charged. Which is another way of saying the film is as handsome as its cast."

For That Shelf, Manuel Betancourt wrote that "From its opening scene to its delectable final image, Nolasco places viewers in Sandro’s leery headscape: his camera lingers in crotches, in sweaty armpits, in luscious lips and, in its more audacious scenes, in engorged members. But there’s always an apprehension about this gaze. Sandro’s eyes may direct our view toward the smorgasbord of men around him — including Maicon, a newcomer who looks like a blond Tom of Finland figure made flesh (an oppressively sculpted Rafael Teóphilo) — but they constantly telegraph a hesitation, an insecurity that reveals his own hangups. Doughier than those he lusts after and less comfortable in his own skin than even the co-worker who starts openly flirting with Maicon much to Sandro’s chagrin (and earning the ire of Maicon’s very macho brother), Sandro’s erotic fantasies remain riddled with the spectre of self-doubt, which ends up animating Nolasco’s steamy tale. Intent on pushing the boundaries of how sex (on and off screen) can help drive narrative storytelling, Vento Seco is an erotic fever dream that’s also a wistful character portrait."

== Awards ==
The film was the winner of the Grand Prix at the 2020 Chéries-Chéris film festival.

At the 2020 Iris Prize festival, Leandro Faria Lelo won the award for Best Performance in a Male Role.
