= Sue Innes =

British journalist, writer, historian, researcher, teacher, artist and campaigner

- Born: 4 May 1948
- Died: 24 February 2005 (aged 56)
- Alma mater: Peterhead Academy; University of St Andrews; University of Edinburgh; Gray's School of Art
- Occupation: Journalist, writer, historian, researcher, teacher, artist
- Spouse(s): Jo Clifford

Susan Innes (4 May 1948 – 24 February 2005) was a British journalist, writer, historian, researcher, teacher, artist and feminist campaigner.

== Early life and education ==
Susan (Sue) Innes was born 4 May 1948 in Weymouth, Dorset, the daughter of Jean Corbin, housewife, and Alec Innes, a professional gardener. She was raised in North Wales and in Peterhead, the hometown of her father.

She went to Peterhead Academy and to Gray's School of Art in Aberdeen, which she gave up in the late 1960s, travelling to San Francisco to join the hippy movement.

She became an activist in the second-wave feminist movement as she started studying English and philosophy at the University of St. Andrews in 1970. She was editor of the university newspaper, Aien.

== Career ==
After her graduation, Sue Innes worked as a journalist for BBC Radio, The Scotsman and Scotland on Sunday.

She returned to academia in 1993 and graduated from the University of Edinburgh in 1998 with a PhD in the areas of politics, history and sociology.

She published a book, Making It Work: women, change and challenge in the 1990s, in 1995.

== Personal life and death ==
At St. Andrews, Innes met Jo Clifford, a Scottish playwright and her lifelong partner. Innes and Clifford had two daughters in 1980 and 1985.

She died on 24 February 2005, aged 56, as a result of a brain tumour.
