= The First Fallen =

- Portuguese: Os Primeiros Soldados
- Literally: The First Soldiers
- Directed by: Rodrigo de Oliveira
- Screenplay by: Rodrigo de Oliveira
- Produced by: Rodrigo de Oliveira; Vitor Graize
- Starring: Johnny Massaro; Renata Carvalho; Victor Camilo; Clara Choveaux; Alex Bonin; Daniel Monjardim; Higor Campagnaro
- Cinematography: Lucas Barbi
- Edited by: Rodrigo de Oliveira
- Music by: Giovani Cidreira
- Production company: Pique-Bandeira Filmes
- Distributed by: Olhar Distribuidora
- Release dates: November 12, 2021 (IFFMH); July 7, 2022
- Running time: 107 minutes
- Country: Brazil
- Language: Portuguese

The First Fallen (in Portuguese: Os Primeiros Soldados, lit. 'The First Soldiers') is a 2021 Brazilian drama film written and directed by Rodrigo de Oliveira. Starring Johnny Massaro, Renata Carvalho, and Victor Camilo, the film portrays members of the LGBTQ community fighting the AIDS epidemic in the early 1980s. It also features the performances of Clara Choveaux, Alex Bonin, Higor Campagnaro, and Daniel Monjardim.

== Plot ==
Set in Vitória, Espírito Santo, Brazil, in the early 1980s, the film depicts people who contracted AIDS and the stigma that accompanied the early days of the disease. Suzano, a biology student who recently returned from studying abroad and, aware that something unknown is affecting his body, seeks to understand the disease and find a cure, while at the same time protecting his sister Maura and his nephew Muriel from its impact. The lack of information about the virus and the uncertain prognosis for those affected leads Suzano to approach transgender performer Rose and film student Humberto, both living with the virus.

== Cast ==
- Johnny Massaro as Suzano Morais
- Renata Carvalho as Rose
- Victor Camilo as Humberto
- Clara Choveaux as Maura Morais
- Alex Bonin as Muriel Morais
- Higor Campagnaro as Joca
- Daniel Monjardim as Ramon
- Vinícius Duarte as Juan
- Jackson Leão as Luiz
- Matheus Muniz as Vicente
- Carlos Rosado as Dr. Caesar
- Verônica Gomes as nurse Norma
- Remi Stengel as Adrian (voice)

== Production ==
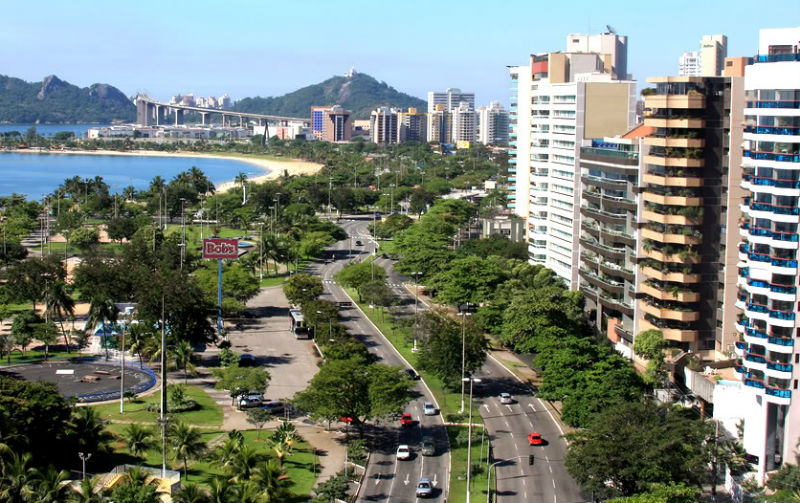
The film is set in Vitória (pictured), the capital of Espírito Santo state.

The First Fallen was produced by Pique-Bandeira Filmes, and according to Oliveira, funding was made possible by the State Department of Culture (Secult), in partnership with the Fundo Setorial do Audiovisual (FSA). Its original screenplay was developed from research into historical AIDS cases that occurred in Vitória, Espírito Santo. When researching the film, Rodrigo Oliveira noticed that deaths within the Espírito Santo state has been counted only since 1985, despite "newspaper headlines, groups of friends, and the silence of nightclubs" indicating that the deaths from HIV/AIDS have already taken place prior to this date. The premise of The First Fallen imagines what the impact of HIV/AIDS on the first infected people would be. The characters Rose, Suzano, and Humberto, become united by the physical and emotional adversity of the then-mysterious disease.

As well as prejudice the infected suffered, the film also aims to show some of the venues that may have been frequented by LGBTQ people at the time. Although the film treats death and other distressing issues at various points in the plot, director Rodrigo Oliveira believes that the film is not about an end, but about new beginnings and ways to survive and live with the virus, saying: "At that time [in which the film is set], death was very likely, but that does not erase the taste, the pleasure, the pain, and the delight of having lived, even without knowing what was happening to oneself".

=== Development ===
The film had an all-queer cast, and Oliveira stated that he would always have queer actors playing queer roles. The actors Johnny Massaro, Clara Choveaux, and Alex Bonin all lived together as a family in an apartment in Rio de Janeiro, which, as Oliveira explained in an interview, was intended to create authentic relationships and a sense of belonging among the actors, so that everything seemed as natural as possible when filming began. Massaro, Victor Camilo, and Renata Carvalho lived together on a farm in Domingos Martins to prepare for their roles.

Due to budget constraints, the production team faced challenges when recreating the city of Vitória of the early 1980s. Oliveira chose the locations in the present-day Vitória that still maintained the appearance of 1983. The fictional gay club Genet, which in the film is located on Maria Ortiz's Staircase in the Historic Center, was recreated within the premises of Hotel Cidade Alta.

== Release and reception ==
The First Fallen premiered internationally at the 70th Mannheim-Heidelberg International Film Festival (IFFMH), in Germany, on November 12, 2021. It was voted Best Film by the Young Jury and received the Audience Award for Best Film. The film had its Asian premiere at the 52nd International Film Festival of India (IFFI), in Goa, where actress Carvalho received the Special Jury Prize for her portrayal of Rose. The film had its Brazilian premiere at the Rio Film Festival, between December 9 and 19, with in-person sessions. On July 7, 2022, the film was commercially released in cinemas throughout Brazil by the distribution company Olhar Filmes. In Espírito Santo, the film was shown at the Cine Metrópolis, located on the campus of the Federal University of Espírito Santo (UFES) in Vitória.

=== Critical response ===
The film has received positive reviews upon its release, and Carvalho's performance in particular received critical acclaim. At its screening at the 52nd International Film Festival of India, the jury awarded Carvalho a special trophy, saying: "[her] contribution to the film goes beyond the performance. She brought authenticity to the complexities of the situation and the era portrayed in society."

Michel Guwilen's review at Plano Critico says that The First Fallen functions as a retroactive exercise, which affects the viewer's feelings and shows an extreme transformation movement from the middle of the film, demanding that the viewer rethink everything that was seen previously. Guwilen also highlights, as one of its main characteristics, the film's lacunar aspect, where missing elements are filled in later. Lucas Lopes Aflitos, a critic from Cine Set, praised the performance of the cast, especially Johnny Massaro who delivered an excellent interpretation of his melancholic, catatonic, and withdrawn character. He adds that the film is important for bringing to light the issue of HIV/AIDS and its stigmatization, noting that even today the disease is seen as a "gay disease" by some.

Bruno Ghetti, a critic for the Folha de S.Paulo, believed that the film starts without much unity, with characters appearing and disappearing seemingly without control from the director. In particular, he criticized the scene where Suzano reappears at a party distributing photos of his own sick body, which seemed too sensationalist for the character. However, Ghetti praised the second half of the film, which he considered extraordinarily solid. He was especially moved by the scenes on the farm, where the protagonists shoot themselves on VHS to immortalize their story, and he considered the film moving as a whole.

=== Awards ===
Year	Associations	Category	Nominee(s)	Result	Ref.
2021	Mannheim-Heidelberg International Film Festival	Best Film (Young Jury)	The First Fallen	Won	
2021	Mannheim-Heidelberg International Film Festival	Best Film (Audience Award)	The First Fallen	Won	
2021	International Film Festival of India	Special Jury Prize	Renata Carvalho	Won	
2021	Rio de Janeiro International Film Festival	Acting Jury Prize	Renata Carvalho	Won	
2022	Mostra de Cinema de Tiradentes	Best Film (Olhos Livres Showcase)	The First Fallen	Won	

== See also ==
- List of Brazilian films of 2021
