= Renata Carvalho =

Brazilian actress, playwright and theater director

- Born: 1981 (age 44–45); Santos, São Paulo
- Occupations: Actress, playwright, theater director

Renata Carvalho (born 1981) is a Brazilian actress, playwright and theater director. She is from the city of Santos in São Paulo and began her career in the 1990s. She is trained in social sciences, and has dubbed herself a transpologist, (Note: Portuguese: transpóloga) a combination of the terms transgender and anthropologist to describe her work on trans experiences and bodies.

== Early life and childhood ==
Born in 1981, Carvalho was born in Santos, São Paulo. Carvalho was forced out of her home and was involved in sex work and temporary work in a salon before formally taking up acting. She is a travesti, and began her gender transition while working as a volunteer against sexually transmitted infections in 2007.

== Career ==
In theatre, she has appeared in Body Your Autobiography, Manifesto Transpofágico (2012), Domínio Público, The Gospel According to Jesus, Queen of Heaven (2016) and Dentro de Mim Mora Outra (Inside Me Lives Another, 2013). On television, she appeared on the HBO Max series Pico da Neblina. In film, she appeared as Paula in Dry Wind (2020) as well as the documentary Quem Tem Medo? (Who's Afraid?, 2020), which discusses censorship in the arts. She played a trans artist in The First Fallen (2022), a film about those affected by the HIV/AIDS crisis of the 1980s in Brazil, as well as the short film Se Trans For Mar (2023). She has also appeared in Um Inimigo do Povo (An Enemy of the People, 2023).

Carvalho played Jesus Christ in the show The Gospel According to Jesus, Queen of Heaven, a translation by Natalia Mallo of the original play of Jo Clifford. Clifford later collaborated with Carvalho to premier the play in Brazil. Carvalho performed the title role over 200 times. This brought Carvalho to wider recognition and caused controversy, including being banned in several cities in the country, such as Jundiaí, Salvador and Rio de Janeiro.

Manifesto Transpofágico (based on a book of the same name that she wrote) received positive reviews.

For her work as an actress in the film The First Fallen, she received the Special Jury Award at the 52nd International Film Festival of India and the Special Jury Award (Troféu Redentor) at the 23rd Festival do Rio – Rio de Janeiro International Film Festival. She was also nominanted for the Shell Theater Award for Best Actress for Um Inimigo do Povo (An Enemy of the People, 2023).

== Activism ==
She is the founder of Monart (Movimento Nacional de Artistas Trans, National Movement of Trans Artists), a Brazilian national network for registering transgender artists to ensure greater representation in the arts. In 2020, she received a grant of US$7,000 for Monart through Afield, an international support network for artists.
