= Leo Steinberg =

American art critic (1920–2011)

- Zalman Lev Steinberg
- Citizenship: American

Academic background
- Education: New York University Institute of Fine Arts (Ph.D.)

Academic work
- Discipline: Art historian
- Institutions: Hunter College (1961-1975); University of Pennsylvania (1975-1991)
- Notable works: Other Criteria: Confrontations With Twentieth-Century Art (1972) and The Sexuality of Christ in Renaissance Art and in Modern Oblivion (1983)

Leo Steinberg (July 9, 1920 – March 13, 2011) was an American art critic and art historian. Between 1961 and 1975 he taught at Hunter College of the City University of New York, and from 1975 until his retirement in 1991 he served as Benjamin Franklin Professor of the History of Art at the University of Pennsylvania. Steinberg made important contributions to the study of both twentieth-century art and the Italian Renaissance, and was described by The New York Times as "one of the most brilliant, influential and controversial art historians of the last half of the 20th century".

== Biography ==
=== Early life and education ===
Steinberg was born Zalman Lev Steinberg in Moscow, Russian SFSR, the son of Isaac Nachman Steinberg, a Jewish lawyer and Socialist Revolutionary Party politician who was People's Commissioner for Justice under Vladimir Lenin from 1917 to 1918. His family left the Soviet Union in 1923, and settled in Berlin, Germany. In 1933, after the Nazis came to power, the Steinbergs were forced to move again, this time to the United Kingdom. Intending to become an artist, Steinberg studied at the Slade School of Fine Art (part of the University of London) and received his diploma in 1940.

In 1945, encouraged by his older sister and her husband, Steinberg moved to New York City. For years he made a living writing art criticism and teaching art, including at the Parsons School of Design. In 1957, William Kolodney invited Steinberg to give a lecture series at the Metropolitan Museum of Art. "Change and Permanence in Western Art" focused on ten periods of art, dealing with problems or solutions with special relevance to modern thought and taste. The importance of his criticism of modern art was proven by his being included in Tom Wolfe's 1975 book The Painted Word, in which Steinberg, Harold Rosenberg, and Clement Greenberg were all labeled the "kings of Cultureburg" for the influence of their criticism. Steinberg eventually moved away from art criticism and developed a scholarly interest in such artists and architects as Francesco Borromini, Michelangelo, and Leonardo da Vinci.

=== Academic career ===
In 1960, he earned his PhD at New York University's Institute of Fine Arts with a dissertation on the architectural symbolism of Borromini's San Carlo alle Quattro Fontane in Rome. Subsequently, he taught at Hunter College of the City University of New York. In 1975, he was appointed Benjamin Franklin Professor of the History of Art at the University of Pennsylvania, where he taught until retiring in 1991. From 1995 to 1996, Steinberg was a guest professor at Harvard University, delivering the Charles Eliot Norton lectures on "The Mute Image and the Meddling Text."

Steinberg approached the history of art in a revolutionary manner, helping to move it from a dry consideration of factual details, documents, and iconographic symbols to a more dynamic understanding of meaning conveyed via various artistic choices. For example, in 1972, Steinberg introduced the idea of the "flatbed picture plane" in his book Other Criteria, a collection of essays. The whole of the Summer, 1983, issue of the journal October was dedicated to Steinberg's essay The Sexuality of Christ in Renaissance Art and in Modern Oblivion, later published as a book by Random House and by publishers in other countries. In that essay, Steinberg examined a previously ignored pattern in Renaissance art, which he named ostentatio genitalium: the prominent display of the genitals of the infant Christ and the attention also drawn to that area in images of Christ near the end of his life, in both cases for specific theological reasons involving the concept of the Incarnation – the word of God made flesh. Steinberg died on March 13, 2011, in New York City at the age of 90.

Steinberg's collection of 3,200 prints is held at The Leo Steinberg Collection, Blanton Museum of Art, University of Texas, Austin. His papers are held at the Getty Research Institute.

== Personal life ==
In 1962 Steinberg married Dorothy Seiberling, an art editor for Life magazine; the marriage ended in divorce. For more than 40 years, Sheila Schwartz was his "indispensable collaborator", assistant and editor. Steinberg had no children.

== Awards ==
- 1983 Award in Literature from the American Academy and Institute of Arts and Letters
- 1984, Frank Jewett Mather Award in Art Journalism, College Art Association
- 1986 MacArthur Fellows Program

== Thesis ==
Steinberg's research particularly focused on the works of Michelangelo, Leonardo da Vinci, and other Italian Renaissance artists and their depictions of Christ in art. As a critic, he produced important work on Pablo Picasso, Jasper Johns and Willem de Kooning. One of his most significant essays was Contemporary Art and the Plight of its Public, which appeared in March 1962 in Harper's Magazine.

Steinberg took an informal approach to criticism, sometimes using a first-person narrative in his essays, which personalized the experience of art for readers. This was in juxtaposition to many formalist critics at the time, such as Clement Greenberg, who were known to be resolute in their writing. In many of his writings, he expressed his love for art's ability not only to reflect life but also to become it and commented, "Anything anybody can do, painting does better." He believed that the difference between modern painting and that of the Old Masters was the viewer's subjective experience of that artwork. He also believed that Abstract Expressionist action painters, such as Jackson Pollock, were more concerned with creating good art than with merely expressing a personal identity on canvas, a point of view contrary to that held by Harold Rosenberg, another American art critic of Steinberg's era.

== Works ==
- Renaissance and Baroque Art: Selected Essays, edited by Sheila Schwartz (University of Chicago Press, 2020).
- Michelangelo's Painting: Selected Essays, edited by Sheila Schwartz (University of Chicago Press, 2019).
- Michelangelo's Sculpture: Selected Essays, edited by Sheila Schwartz (University of Chicago Press, 2018).
- Leo Steinberg: Selections
- Other Criteria: Confrontations with Twentieth Century Art, (Oxford University Press, 1972; reprinted University of Chicago Press, 2007).
- "Pontormo's Capponi Chapel." Art Bulletin 56, no. 3 (1974): 385–399.
- "Borromini's San Carlo alle quattro fontane: A Study in Multiple Form and Architectural Symbolism (Ph.D. diss., New York University, 1960). Garland Publishing, 1977.
- The Sexuality of Christ in Renaissance Art and in Modern Oblivion. (Pantheon, 1983; revised edition University of Chicago Press, 1996.)
- Leonardo's Incessant Last Supper (Zone Books, 2001).
- "Contemporary Art and the Plight of its Public" Harper's 224 no. 1,342 (March 1962): 31–39.
