= Jens Jørgen Thorsen =

Danish artist, director, and jazz musician (1932–2000)

Jens Jørgen Thorsen (2 February 1932 Holstebro – 15 November 2000) was a Danish artist, director, and jazz musician whose works sometimes created controversy.

Thorsen began his artistic career attending periodically the Royal Danish Academy of Fine Arts. Jens Jørgen Thorsen was part of the Situationist International Movement, in particular his happenings and collaboration with Jørgen Nash are well documented.

Thorsen also wrote, directed, and starred in a number of films, the most notable of them being Quiet Days in Clichy (Stille dage i Clichy,1970), based on the Henry Miller novel.

In painting, Thorsen painted a number of abstract works, which have become increasingly collectible. He also stirred up controversy with a work depicting Jesus in a manner some considered pornographic. Thorsen planned a film called The Many Faces of Jesus, later The Sex Life of Jesus, and was to have involved both heterosexual and homosexual acts. The film plans met with strong national and international protests and accusations of blasphemy resulting in the Danish Film Academy withdrawing its financial support. The film was to have been made in Britain, but it faced intense opposition from Christian morality campaigner Mary Whitehouse, pressure groups, as well as from the Queen, then Prime Minister James Callaghan, the Archbishop of Canterbury Donald Coggan, and Pope Paul VI, who called the film "an insult ... which transforms Christ into sacrilegious bait for filthy falseness". The Return of Jesus (1992) (a completely different project) was made after the ban on the original project was rescinded in 1990. The controversy, and particularly Thorsen's reported interest in producing the film in the United States, led to a decades-long hoax that the release of such a film was imminent.

Thorsen was also a jazz musician and co-founder of the group Papa Bue's Viking Jazzband.
