= The First Temptation of Christ =

2019 film by Rodrigo Van Der Put

- Promotional poster
- Portuguese: A Primeira Tentação de Cristo
- Directed by: Rodrigo Van Der Put
- Written by: Fábio Porchat; Gustavo Martins
- Produced by: Tereza Gonzales
- Starring: Gregorio Duvivier; Antonio Tabet; Fábio Porchat
- Cinematography: Rodrigo Graciosa
- Edited by: Aruan Lotar
- Music by: Heaven Loops; Ilan Becker; Lucas Cassano; Ariel Donato
- Production company: Porta dos Fundos
- Distributed by: Netflix
- Release date: 3 December 2019
- Running time: 46 minutes
- Country: Brazil
- Language: Portuguese

The First Temptation of Christ (Portuguese: A Primeira Tentação de Cristo) is a 2019 Brazilian satirical comedy film produced by the comedy troupe Porta dos Fundos. It was released on Netflix on 3 December 2019.

== Plot ==
Jesus returns home after 40 days in the desert, where a surprise 30th birthday party awaits him. At the party, Mary and Joseph reveal to Jesus that his true father is God.

== Cast ==
- Gregorio Duvivier as Jesus
- Antonio Tabet as God
- Fábio Porchat as Orlando/Devil
- Evelyn Castro as Mary
- Rafael Portugal as Joseph
- Robson Nunes as Balthazar
- João Vicente de Castro as Melchior
- Estevam Nabote as Caspar
- Thati Lopes as Thelma
- Sura Berditchevsky as Tia Lupita
- Fabio de Luca as Lazarus
- Gabriel Totoro as Buddha
- Pedroca Monteiro as Shiva
- Pedro Benevides as Jah Rastafari

== Reception ==
The Christmas special has faced backlash over its satirical depictions, which imply Jesus has a gay lover and Mary smokes marijuana. Over 2 million people have petitioned online for the show's removal and advocated boycotts of Netflix over perceived blasphemy; the creators maintain the protests are homophobic.

On 24 December 2019, the headquarters of Porta dos Fundos in Rio de Janeiro was bombed with two Molotov cocktails. (Note: Attributed to multiple sources:) A Brazilian Integralist religious group calling themselves the "Popular Nationalist Insurgency Command of the Large Brazilian Integralist Family" claimed responsibility for the bombing, even filming themselves attacking the offices while wearing ski masks; the group also criticized Netflix and labeled The First Temptation of Christ as blasphemous.

In January 2020, Dias Toffoli, the president of the Supreme Federal Court of Brazil, intervened on the attempted censorship of the film, overruling a judge from the Rio de Janeiro Court of Justice who ordered the film's withdrawal from the streaming platform. The film was ultimately removed from Netflix on 31 August 2021.

== See also ==
- The Last Temptation of Christ (novel) (1955)
- The Last Temptation of Christ (film) (1988)
- The Last Hangover (2018)
- List of works depicting Jesus as LGBT
- Gay Jesus film hoax
