= The Gospel According to Jesus, Queen of Heaven =

2009 play by Jo Clifford

The Gospel According to Jesus, Queen of Heaven is a theatrical monologue, written and performed by British playwright Jo Clifford, which imagines Jesus Christ reincarnated in modern times as a transgender woman. The Brazilian version, O Evangelho Segundo Jesus, Rainha do Céu, was translated and directed by Natalia Mallo and adapted and performed by Renata Carvalho. The play toured in Brazil, Germany, Northern Ireland, Scotland, Cape Verde and others. The play has been accused of offending religious sensibilities due to its portrayal of Jesus as transgender, and as such the team has suffered physical assaults, a bomb attack, and death threats during the season, and the show was censored in several cities across Brazil, notably Jundiaí, Salvador, and Rio de Janeiro.

== Original text ==
The play originated in 2009, during a performance in Glasgow, in a small theater with a capacity of only about 30 people.

The play was on hiatus for years due to fear of reprisals from establishments and directors. It only returned to the stage in 2014, in Edinburgh. The audience was small, but among them was the Brazilian theatre director Natalia Mallo, who, after the performance, asked Clifford for the text to create a Portuguese version. Clifford presented the play in Brazil in 2020 at the São Paulo International Theatre Festival. The festival that year also featured the Brazilian version with Renata Carvalho.

== Australia ==
The play also had an Australian version, starring Kristen Smyth and directed by Kitan Petkovski. Although the original version only featured the actress on stage, this one added a four-person choral accompaniment, singing an original soundtrack by Rachel Lewindon. It won the 2021 Green Room Awards for Best Independent Theatre Production.

== Censorship ==
In September 2017, the play's performance at SESC Jundiaí was banned by court order. In the same year, the Judiciary prohibited the performance that was to take place in Salvador, at the Bahia International Performing Arts Festival. In 2018, Marcelo Crivella, then mayor of Rio de Janeiro, banned performances of the show in municipal establishments, and the play ended up having only one performance in the city. Also in 2018, the state of Pernambuco banned the performance of the show at the Garanhuns Winter Festival, after protests from religious groups in the region.
