= Jo Clifford =

British playwright (born 1951)

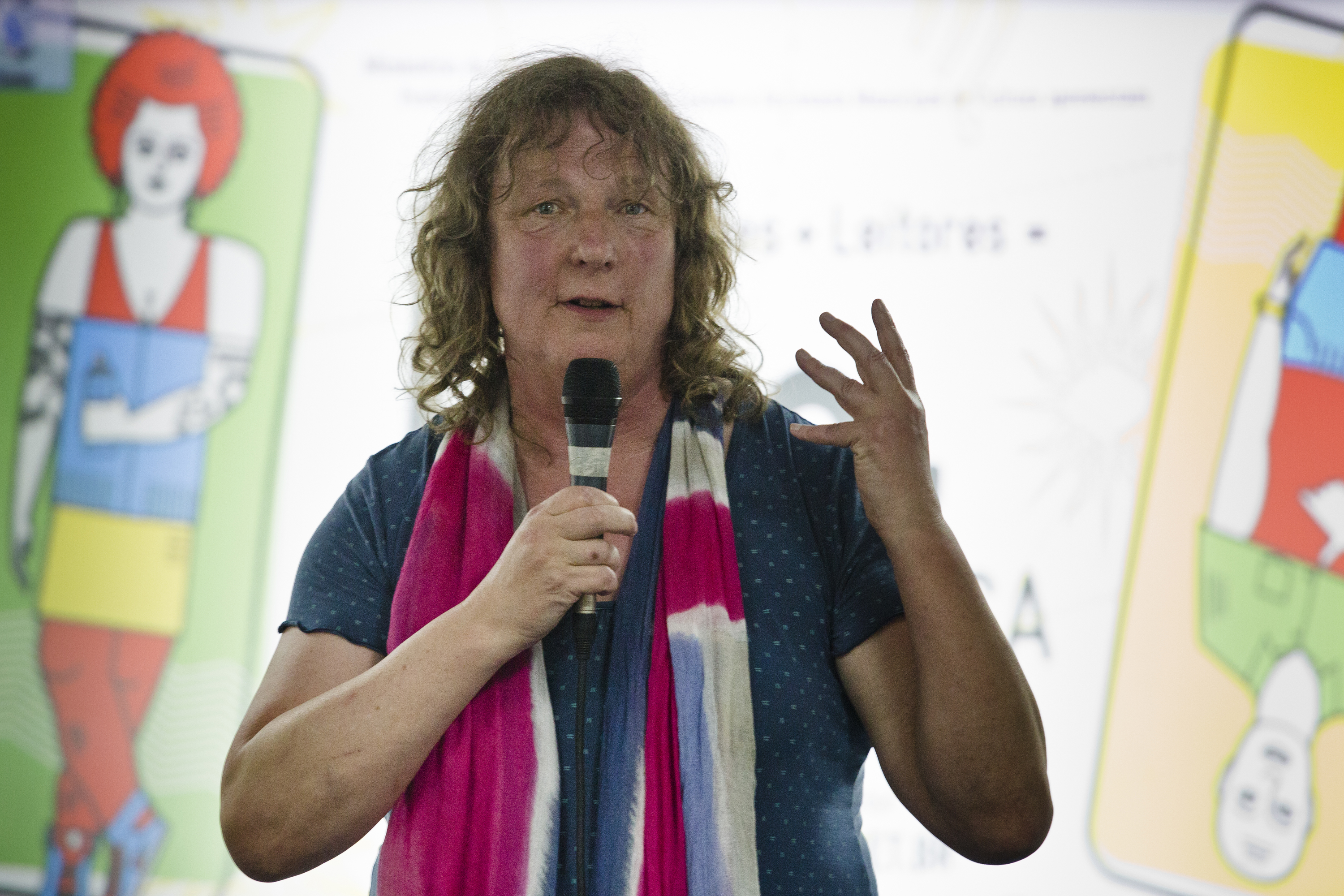
- Cifford at the FLUPP Literary Festival, 2016
- Born: 22 March 1950 (age 76); North Staffordshire, England
- Education: Clifton College; University of St Andrews
- Occupations: Writer and actor
- Employer: Queen Margaret University
- Spouse: Sue Innes (died 2005)
- Children: 2
- Awards: Olwen Wymark award (2021)

Jo Clifford (born 1951) is a British writer and actor based in Edinburgh. In 2017, she was inducted into the Saltire Society's community of Outstanding women of Scotland, and was given the Olwen Wymark award by the Writers' Guild of Great Britain in 2021.

Clifford studied at the University of St Andrews. Her publisher is Chris Goode and Company.

== Career ==
Clifford first discovered theatre through playing women's roles in school plays. One of the earliest plays she wrote was Losing Venice in 1985, the first of a series written for the Traverse Theatre in Edinburgh. These all had a gender-balanced cast and a central female character. Clifford has written several adaptations for the stage, including Anna Karenina, which premiered at Edinburgh's Royal Lyceum in 2005. Charles Nowosielski commissioned her to write adaptations of Anton Chekov's The Seagull and The Cherry Orchard for performance by Theatre Alba in Duddingston Kirk Gardens on the Edinburgh Festival Fringe in 2010 and 2011 respectively.

Clifford's first professional acting was in The Gospel According To Jesus, Queen of Heaven, which she wrote in 2009 as part of the Glasgay! Festival. This work is the sequel to God's New Frock (2003). It was one of the first in the UK to be written by and starring a trans person. The play features Jesus as a trans woman. Natalia Mallo translated the script into Portuguese, with permission from Clifford, after seeing it performed at the Edinburgh Fringe in 2014. Mallo then collaborated with travesti performer Renata Carvalho to premiere the play in Brazil in 2016. It has been translated into Spanish and performed in Argentina and Chile.

Her play Every One premiered at the Royal Lyceum Theatre in Edinburgh in 2010. It has been called a modern version of the medieval play, Everyman.

Clifford is Professor of Theatre in the School of Drama and Creative Industries at Edinburgh's Queen Margaret University.

Clifford's personal and literary archive is held at the National Library of Scotland.

== Reception and analysis ==
=== Christianity and LGBT ===
Speaking to Katie Goh of Dazed, Clifford said that The Gospel According to Jesus, Queen of Heaven had begun her social gender transition, where she was "encountering hatred on the street from people shouting abuse at me, saying horrible things, laughing at me. I wondered where this hatred came from. I'd read the Gospels, and when I read them I was profoundly moved. I had been brought up as a Christian and taught that when you're unsure of what to do, you should try to think, 'What would Jesus do?' I thought, 'Well, what would Jesus do if Jesus came back to earth now and was me, a trans woman? What would she do and what would she say?' That was the origin of the play." In Out of the Ordinary: Representations of LGBT Lives, Clifford spoke about the abuse she experienced, connecting it to what she saw as harsh prohibitions against transgender and gender variant individuals in the Old Testament of the Bible. She discusses Yahwism, which she says venerates God the Father, replacing the worship of the Mother Goddess in ancient Middle Eastern cultures, but notes that the link is not strong enough to make for academic purposes.

A 2009 production of The Gospel According to Jesus, Queen of Heaven at the Tron Theatre attracted hundreds of protesters. Archbishop Mario Conti, the Catholic Archbishop of Glasgow, said it was "difficult to imagine a more provocative and offensive abuse of Christian beliefs". When the play was shown in Brazil, it was banned in several cities, including Jundiaí, Salvador and Rio de Janeiro.

=== Death ===
Her play Every One received a 5-star review from Mark Fisher in The Guardian, who described Every One as offering a profound response to death. Fisher argues that the play engages with social societal issues in a cathartic manner, although he critiqued the play's ending for its perceived lack of resolution. Sally Hales in Exeunt described the play as "a big rollercoaster ride through the responsibilities we have to ourselves, our family".

== Personal life ==
Clifford was born in North Staffordshire in 1951 and was sent to board at Clifton College in Bristol aged 7. Her mother died suddenly when Clifford was 12 years old.

After school, Clifford studied languages (Spanish and Arabic) at the University of St Andrews, with Ferdy Woodward. It was here that Clifford met Sue Innes in 1971, and they later married. The couple had 2 daughters and were together for 33 years until Innes' death from a brain tumour in 2006.

Clifford is a trans woman, and has been quoted as saying that she has identified as such "for as long as I remember". Clifford transitioned in 2006, after Innes' death.

== Awards and honours ==
- Featured in The Independent's Pink List 2013: Ones To Watch
- 2017 Clifford was inducted into the Saltire Society's community of Outstanding women of Scotland.
- In 2021, Clifford won the Olwen Wymark award, given by the Writers' Guild of Great Britain.

== Selected works ==
- Losing Venice (1985)
- Great Expectations (adaptation – 1988)
- Ines de Castro (1989)
- Light in the Village (1991, published by Nick Hern Books)
- Writing Home to Mother (1997)
- Life Is A Dream 1998
- God's New Frock (2003)
- Anna Karenina (2005)
- Faust (translation – 2006)
- The Gospel According to Jesus, Queen of Heaven (2009)
- Spam Fritters (2009), radio play
- La Princesse de Clèves (2010), dramatisation for radio of La Princesse de Clèves by Madame de La Fayette
- Every One (2010)
- The Tree of Knowledge (2011, published by Nick Hern Books)
- Thirty-Six by Jo Clifford and Bayley Turner (2026, published by Salamander Street)
