= Baptist Press =

Organization

Baptist Press (BP) is the official news service of the Southern Baptist Convention (SBC) and is headquartered in Nashville, Tennessee. Baptist Press is a ministry assignment of the executive committee of the Southern Baptist Convention.

Baptist Press is responsible for providing regular news releases about Southern Baptists, serving as the convention's press representative, and coordinating news operations for annual meetings of the Southern Baptist Convention. Baptist Press also provides news service to state Baptist papers.

== Origins ==
The service was formed at the suggestion of the editors of the state convention newspapers in 1946. Since then, it has grown into the largest religious news service in the United States, based in Nashville, Tennessee. State papers reprint stories and opinion pieces from Baptist Press to inform Baptists in the respective states about the news those editors deem significant for their readers. Recognizing its role to serve the broader evangelical community, Baptist Press seeks to carry stories and report news that is of interest to numerous like-minded evangelical readers.

Baptist Press is funded by contributions from Southern Baptists through the SBC Cooperative Program as well as through digital advertising.

== BP en Español ==
Baptist Press also provides daily and weekly news and opinion for the Hispanic Baptist community through BPEE (Baptist Press en Español), a separate webpage linked directly at baptistpress.com and linked from the front page of the BP site.

== BP Sports ==
BP Sports, formed in September 2000, was a division of Baptist Press that provided daily scores and sports features from the 56 colleges and universities affiliated with the SBC. The service also provided special features on professional athletes and coaches who use their position in sports to promote the Christian faith. The division has since been discontinued, but BP frequently provides faith stories from those involved in major sporting events such as the Olympics, the Super Bowl, the World Series, and the College Football Playoff.
