= Africa Check =

Non-profit organisation

- Type: Non-profit organisation
- Industry: Journalism
- Founded: June 2012; 14 years ago
- Headquarters: South Africa
- Area served: South Africa, Kenya, Nigeria and Senegal
- Key people: Noko Makgato (Executive director); Lee Mwiti (Chief Editor); David Ajikobi (Nigeria editor); Alphonce Shiundu (Kenya editor); Samba Dialimpa Badji (Senegal Editor)
- Services: Fact checking
- Website: africacheck.org

Africa Check is a non-profit fact checking organisation set up in 2012 to promote accuracy in public debate and the media in Africa. The organisation's goal is to raise the quality of information available to society across the continent. Africa Check is an independent organisation with offices in Johannesburg, Nairobi, Lagos, Dakar and London, producing reports in English and French testing claims made by public figures, institutions and the media against the best available evidence.

== History ==
Africa Check was launched by Peter Cunliffe-Jones after it won an International Press Institute news innovation contest sponsored by Google. It was modelled after FactCheck.org and PolitiFact.com and is the first website in South Africa to focus only on fact checking.

Africa Check's main team is based in Johannesburg, South Africa at the Journalism Department of the University of the Witwatersrand, where they currently have a fact-checking team including their Chief Editor, along with fundraising, training and research services and a head of digital communication.

In October 2015, Africa Check established a fact-checking team based at the EJICOM school of journalism in Dakar, Senegal. The Dakar team operates Africa Check's French-language website. Africa Check later opened regional offices in Lagos, Nigeria, in 2016 and Nairobi, Kenya, in 2017.

In March 2019, Noko Makgato was appointed as the new director of Africa Check. In the same month Peter Cunliffe-Jones, the 2012 founder of Africa Check, announced that he would resign from his position as executive director with effect from May 2019 as he had been appointed as the International Fact-Checking Network's senior adviser.

In June 2019, the second Africa Fact meeting, hosted by Africa Check, was attended by around 30 people from seven African countries, who shared best practice experience. During the subsequent sixth annual Global Fact-Checking Summit they gathered information about the status and development of the fact checking industry.

In March 2021 Africa Check was the only African organisation awarded funds from the Google News Initiative's (GNI) $3-million GNI Vaccine Counter-Misinformation Open Fund, to support them in exposing COVID-19 vaccine fake news.

By 2026, the organisation stated that it had published nearly 2,500 fact-check reports and third-party fact checks, verified almost 3,300 claims, produced more than 800 factsheets, guides and blog posts, and trained over 12,400 journalists and other information practitioners.

== Fact checks in the new media ==
Africa Check is known for its work on fact-checking viral claims made about South Africa on Facebook, such as a claim in 2013 that South Africa was "worse off now than 19 years ago." Sixteen claims about South Africa were investigated including claims such as "unemployment in South Africa has increased by over 60% in the past 19 years", South Africa has the highest rate of rape in the world, and South Africa is one of the top-ten countries in the world for murder. Regarding these claims, Africa Check found that South Africa's unemployment rate has increased from 20% to 24.7% during the last 19 years, an increase of 23.5%, so the claim of a 60% increase was false. They could not substantiate the claim that South Africa has the highest rate of rape in the world, but they reported that it is probably true that South Africa is in the top ten countries for highest murder rates.

Africa Check has also debunked claims of "herbal cures" for HIV/AIDS that have spread in Africa, noting that there is no evidence for the effectiveness of any of these claimed remedies.

In South Africa, there has been some debate about whether South African farm attacks are an organised genocide against white South African farmers or whether the rate of attacks and murders is consistent with the overall murder rate in South Africa. Africa Check reported that the current murder rate of whites is less than the murder rate of other racial groups in South Africa and that it is less than the murder rate for whites from 1979 to 1991, which was during the apartheid era and drawing into question the claim of genocide.

Originating with the World Health Organization (WHO) in 2008, the claim that 80% of South Africans use traditional healers has been spread by the news media worldwide. Africa Check found that this claim was greatly exaggerated and that the claim could be traced to an unsubstantiated claim made in 1983 WHO documents.

Africa Check has objected to the notion of claiming particular places are "rape capitals of the world". According to Africa Check, it is not possible to make such comparisons because different countries have different legal definitions of rape, methods of collecting data of rapes, and levels of reporting rape. All of these issues make exact comparisons of rape rates across countries impossible, because the data is currently too unreliable.

It also has a dedicated platform – the InfoFinder – with reliable sources of information from different African countries.

In October 2018, Facebook announced its intention to co-operate with Africa Check and other third-party fact-checkers in Kenya, as well as the help of users, to flag fake news stories in a bid to improve the quality of news people find on its platform. It was subsequently to be rolled out to other African states. In the same month Facebook also started to provide fact checking tools to reduce fake news in Nigeria.

In March 2019, Africa Check, in co-operation with nonprofit organisation Volume Investigations, introduced the "What's crap on WhatsApp?" service to identify fake news more easily. In August 2019, it was announced that Facebook, in partnership with Africa Check, would introduce new local language coverage for several African languages. In the same month Africa Check, together with the podcast company Volume, saw an incredible growth in its WhatsApp podcast exposing widely distributed false information and was able to extended its base of supporters throughout the COVID-19 pandemic.

== Fact checks on gender violence against women ==
In August 2018 Africa Check reported about women in South Africa protesting against violence and femicide as it emerged that the number of murders of women were four times as high in South Africa as in the rest of the world. In January 2019 Africa Check reported that 40,035 rapes had been documented by the South African Police in the 12-month period up to 31 March 2018, which averaged on 110 rapes per day which caused South Africa's Cyril Ramaphosa to call for action against this 'rape crisis'.

== Fact checks on murder of white farmers ==
In 2018 Africa Check called out Australia's humanitarian efforts to help South African farmers by fast tracking their applications for visas and again reported that it is "near impossible" to accurately calculate the figure of farm murders in South Africa but that newly estimated and reliable figures showed that the rate of overall farm murders of all ethnic origin could be a mere 0.4 murders per 100,000 people. Australia's home affairs, immigration and border protection minister Peter Dutton had relied on false reports that murders of white South African farmers happened every week.

== Fact checks on immigration ==
In November 2020 Africa Check exposed fake news issued by former Joburg mayor Herman Mashaba who had claimed in a tweet that there were 15-million "undocumented foreigners" living in South Africa and who had willingly misinterpreted correct information published by other reputable sources.

In March 2021 Africa Check confirmed that the number of 15 million was grossly inflated.

== African fact-checking awards ==
Africa Check has been running the continent's first African Fact-checking Awards. In their first year, 2014, the awards were won by two journalists from Ghana, and the runners-up came from Kenya and Zambia. In 2015, the winner came from Nigeria and runner-up from South Africa. In 2016, Africa Check created an awards category for reports published in the Francophone media. That year, the awards were won by journalists from Cameroon and Côte d'Ivoire, with runners-up from Nigeria and Swaziland.

In 2017, Africa Check added a student category, as fact-checking continues to become an essential skill. This saw Moussa Ngom of CESTI in Senegal become the very first francophone African journalism student to win the inaugural best fact-checking report by a student journalist award. Banathi Mgqoboka of Rhodes University's School of Journalism and Media Studies in South Africa became the first anglophone African journalism student to be shortlisted for the inaugural best fact-checking report by a student journalist award while attending the Cape Peninsula University of Technology in 2017.

Africa Check also awards the annual fact-checking award in the working journalists' category. In 2018, this was awarded to Nigerian Chikezie Omeje, a Senior Investigative Reporter with the International Centre for Investigative Reporting (ICIR). In 2019, Nigerian journalist Odinaka Anudu of Business Day Nigeria was awarded this accolade, and in 2020, it went to Nigerian journalist Taiwo Adebulu of TheCable newspaper.

== Methods of fact-checking ==
Identify the exact claim that is to be verified. Contact the person who makes the claim to ask them about the source or proof of their claim. Then fact-checkers must turn to experts in the field to add nuance and context. Afterwards authors write their reports, setting out the evidence step by step and indicating the sources used. The manuscript is passed on to an editor for review. Only once a verdict is agreed, is the article published.

In February 2020, the three fact checking organizations Africa Check, Chequeado and Full Fact started to investigate existing research results on "fact checking" with the aim to equip fact checkers globally to see how they can not only counter wrong information but also contribute to "creating a healthier information ecosystem in the long term" and to enable the public to better identify checkable claims and to be more critical about what they read.

== Funding ==
Africa Check is registered as a non-profit trust in South Africa and as a community interest company in Britain.

Africa Check was established by a £45,648 initial grant in 2012. The Agence France-Presse (AFP) Foundation, and the University of the Witwatersrand provided funding.

In 2016, it raised slightly below £473,000. In 2016, Africa Check's major donors were the Shuttleworth Foundation (26% of income), Omidyar Network (23%), the Bill & Melinda Gates Foundation (13%), the Open Society Foundation for South Africa (OSF-SA) (12%), and the Millennium Trust (9%), and Agence France-Presse (5%). In 2016, Africa Check earned about 6% of its income from TRI Facts, its commercial Training, Research & Information unit, which provides commercial services. Other non-profits make up smaller percentages of income, and about 1% of income comes from individual donors.
