= Michael Tracey (producer) =

British-American academic and television producer (born 1948)

Michael Tracey (born August 1948) is a British-American academic and television producer with a specialty in public service broadcasting. He acquired notability as a result of his tenure as the head of the Broadcasting Research Unit in London, a British think tank dealing with media issues, and later with his investigative reporting on the death of JonBenét Ramsey. He is the author of The Decline and Fall of Public Service Broadcasting and the Production of Political Television. He is currently a professor at the University of Colorado at Boulder.

== Education ==
Tracey earned a bachelor's of arts in politics from the University of Exeter in 1971, followed by a PhD in mass communications in 1974 from the University of Leicester. From 1981 to 1988, he was the director of the Broadcasting Research Unit in London. He has been a professor at the University of Colorado at Boulder since 1988.

== JonBenét Ramsey case ==
Tracey is the producer of three documentaries about the death of JonBenét Ramsey. He has been a strong advocate for the innocence of JonBenét's parents, and critical of the media frenzy that implicated the parents. On July 9, 2008, twelve years after the murder, DNA evidence of an unknown male was found on at least three different places on two different articles of her clothing. This, among other evidence, led Boulder DA Mary Lacy to officially exonerate the family, and even write them a letter of apology for them having been previously considered suspects.

Tracey has been "considered a notorious developer of false leads" by "Internet sleuths investigating the JonBenét Ramsey case". In his documentary Who Killed the Pageant Queen?, which aired June 16, 2004 in the United Kingdom, Tracey "claimed to have stunning new evidence that was leading police to a previously unidentified 'prime suspect'". According to Tracey, police were trying to find this suspect, but they were stymied "because he had gone 'underground'". However, based on details in the documentary, a viewer determined this "suspect" was John Steven Gigax. Gigax was an acquaintance of Michael Helgoth, who was briefly considered a suspect, but Gigax had not gone into hiding, and Tom Bennett of the Boulder District Attorney's office stated that Gigax was never a suspect.

Tracey later identified John Mark Karr to law enforcement as a person who should be investigated in the Ramsey case. Karr's confession to the crime earned widespread attention, but DNA tests later ruled him out as a suspect. Tracey and Karr corresponded extensively; Tracey contacted Boulder law enforcement and worked with them as an informant, which ultimately led to their decision to charge Karr with the murder. Radio host Peter Boyles, who was perhaps the loudest and most persistent public accuser of the Ramsey family during the 1990s, called Tracey an "opportunist" who "has perpetuated the JonBenét mystery for his own benefit", while Paul Voakes, dean of the University of Colorado at Boulder journalism school, "defended Tracey as an altruistic investigator".

== Other works ==
Tracey was once a columnist for the Rocky Mountain News.
