= Sexuality and marital status of Jesus =

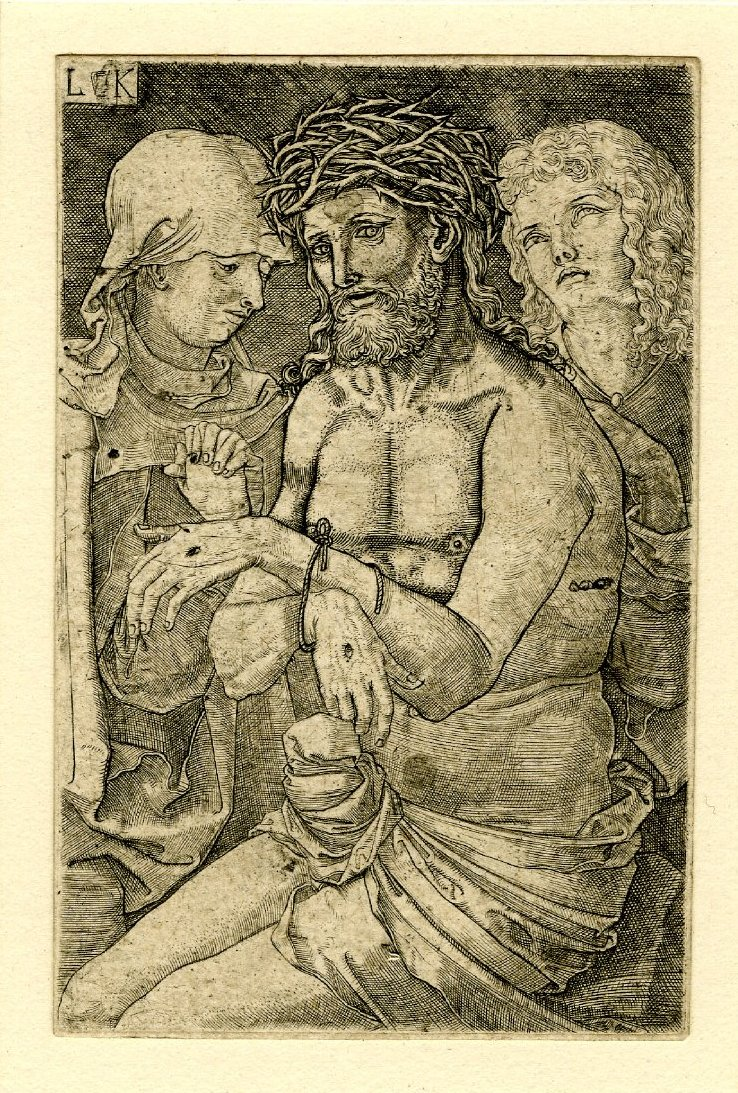
1500s depiction of Christ with cloth wrapped around his supposedly erect penis, an example of ostentatio genitalium.

Christian churches and theologians traditionally hold that Jesus never married and remained celibate until his death. However, this has not prevented alternative and fringe theories of his sexuality, as the gospels and the rest of the New Testament do not focus on the subject.

== Background ==
=== Jewish sexual norms ===
In first century Judaea, sexual immorality in Second Temple Judaism included incest, impure thoughts, homosexual relations, adultery, and bestiality. According to the rabbinic interpretation of Genesis 2:24, "a man shall leave his father and his mother" forbids a man from having relations with his father's wife and his own biological mother; "cleave to his wife" forbids a man from having more than one wife, or having relations with another woman; and "they shall become one flesh" forbids a man from having relations with non-human beings (such as animals). Jesus states in the gospels that he came "not to abolish, but to fulfill the law", and at his various trials, no one could testify that Jesus broke them (Matthew 5:17, Matthew 26:59–60).

=== Corporeal genitalia ===
Christ is ascribed a male human body during his time on Earth, including a set of male genitalia. The Circumcision is a major event of the early life of Jesus, originally described in Luke as taking place shortly before the Presentation at the Temple in accordance with the Jewish law followed by Mary and Joseph. The Holy Prepuce, or foreskin, removed from Jesus's body is a major Christian relic and is described by one scholar as representing a focus on the humanity of Jesus.

Beginning in the 13th century, European art would break with Christian tradition of hiding Jesus's genitalia using clothing and composition, instead depicting Christ with a visible or even physically erect phallus. This "display of the genitals" was coined in art scholarship as the ostentatio genitalium, mirroring the ostentatio vulnerum, or "display of the wounds", during the Passion.

== Celibacy ==
Mainstream Christian thinking typically assumes Jesus to have remained celibate and without a defined sexuality, living a pious life free from sins such as lust or fornication.

=== Eunuchdom ===
In the Gospel of Matthew 19:3–12, Jesus is reported to have referred to the behavior of eunuchs to illustrate a desirable approach to sexuality: "For there are some eunuchs, which were so born from their mother's womb: and there are some eunuchs, which were made eunuchs of men: and there be eunuchs, which have made themselves eunuchs for the kingdom of heaven's sake." The term "eunuch" normally referred to a castrated man. Several theologians and Bible commentators have interpreted this passage as indicating Jesus's support for complete celibacy. (Note: In the ancient Middle East and Asia, eunuchs often served as officials overseeing harems, or in other Royal positions. See Encyclopaedia of the Orient for more details.)

The early Christian writer Origen who was purported to have interpreted Jesus' words literally, was alleged by Eusebius to have castrated himself as an act of devotion. The early Church Father Tertullian wrote that Jesus himself lived as a "eunuch", (Note: There is some controversy in this statement as in context, spado, which in most cases means "eunuch", is generally translated as "virgin" as in here and a fuller explanation can be found here. e.g. Tertullian, On Monogamy, 3: "...He stands before you, if you are willing to copy him, as a voluntary spado (eunuch) in the flesh." And elsewhere: "The Lord Himself opened the kingdom of heaven to eunuchs and He Himself lived as a eunuch. The apostle [Paul] also, following His example, made himself a eunuch...") likewise encouraged people to adopt this practice.

== Heterosexuality ==
=== Mary Magdalene ===
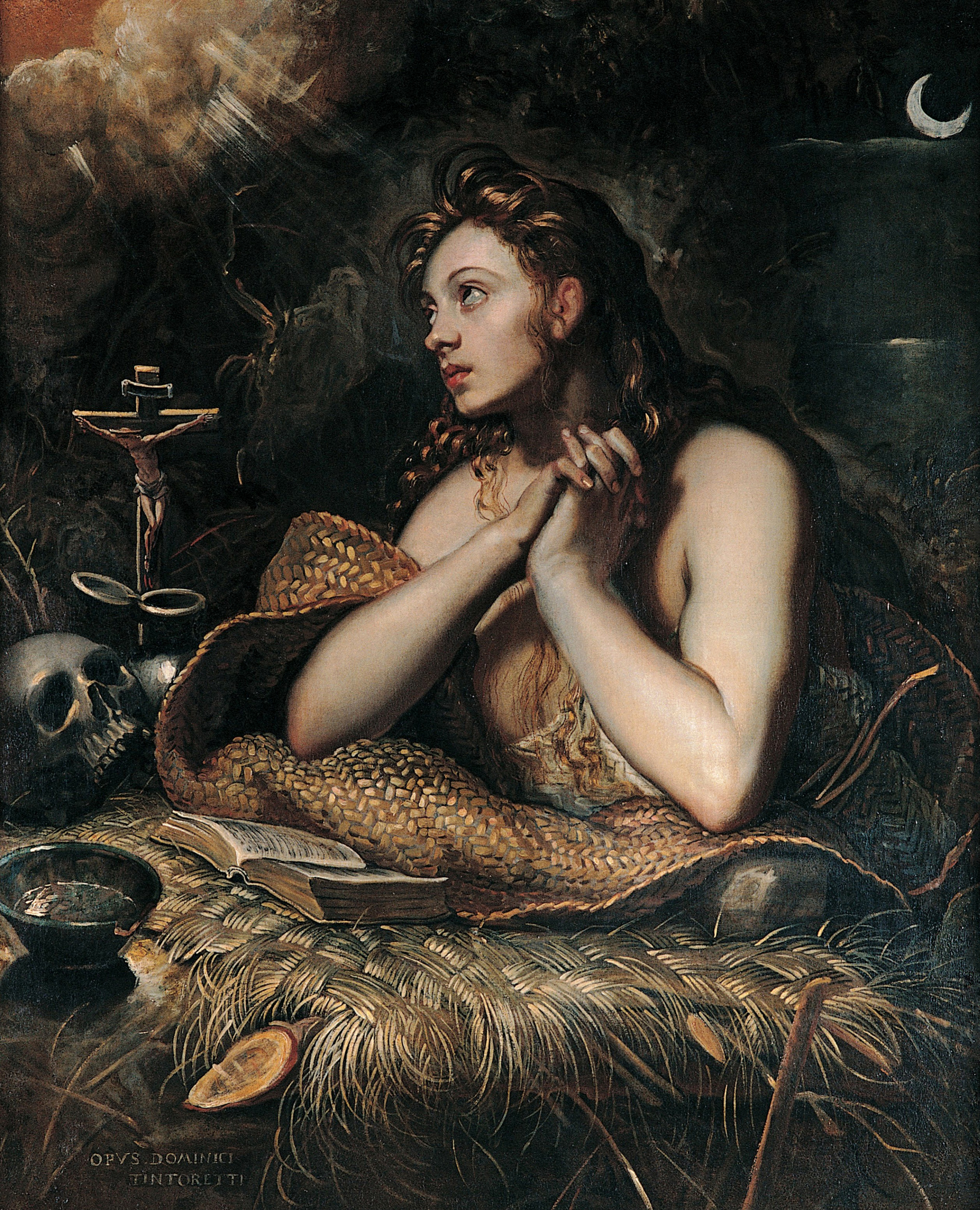
The Penitent Magdalene by Domenico Tintoretto, c. 1600

The non-canonical 3rd-century Gospel of Philip, using Coptic variants of the Greek κοινωνός (koinōnos), describes Jesus' relationship with Mary Magdalene. The gospel uses cognates of koinōnos and Coptic equivalents to refer both to the literal pairing of men and women in marriage and sexual intercourse, but also metaphorically, referring to a spiritual partnership, and the reunification of the Gnostic Christian with the divine realm.

The Gospel of Philip mentions Mary Magdalene as one of three women named Mary "who always walked with the Lord" (Philip 59.6–11). The work also says that the Lord loved her more than all the disciples, and used to kiss her often (Philip 63.34–36). Author John Dickson argues that it was common in early Christianity to kiss a fellow believer by way of greeting (1 Peter 5:14), thus such kissing would have no romantic connotations. Professor of philosophy and religion Jeffrey J. Kripal writes that "the historical sources are simply too contradictory and simultaneously too silent" to make absolute declarations regarding Jesus' sexuality.

Bart Ehrman, a scholar of the Greek New Testament and early Christianity, concludes that historical evidence says nothing at all about Jesus' sexuality—"certainly nothing to indicate that Jesus and Mary had a sexual relationship of any kind". Ehrman says that the question people ask him most often is whether Mary Magdalene and Jesus of Nazareth married each other (after the claim was popularized in The Da Vinci Code):

It is not true that the Dead Sea Scrolls contained Gospels that discussed Mary and Jesus. ... Nor is it true that the marriage of Mary and Jesus is repeatedly discussed in the Gospels that didn't make it into the New Testament. In fact, it is never discussed at all—never even mentioned, not even once. ... It is not true that the Gospel of Philip calls Mary Jesus' spouse.

=== Polygamy ===
Early Latter Day Saints Apostle Orson Hyde taught that Jesus was a polygamist who was married to Mary Magdalene, Martha, and Mary of Bethany, and fathered children with them. He also taught that the marriage at Cana was Jesus' own wedding. This idea is not official LDS doctrine, although it has entered into Mormon folklore.

== Homosexuality ==
=== Disciple whom Jesus loved ===
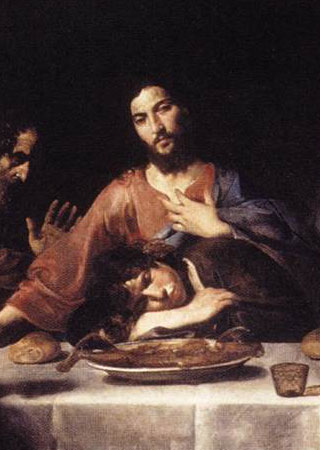
Jesus and John at the Last Supper, by Valentin de Boulogne, 17th century

The Gospel of John makes references to the "disciple whom Jesus loved" (John 13:23, John 19:26, John 21:7–20), a phrase which does not occur in the Synoptic Gospels. In the text, this "beloved disciple" is present at the crucifixion of Jesus, with Jesus' mother, Mary. The "disciple whom Jesus loved" may be a self-reference by the author of the Gospel (John 21:24), traditionally regarded as John the Apostle. In subsequent centuries, the reference was used by those who implied a homosocial or homoerotic reading of the relationship. For example, scholar Louis Crompton notes that Saint Aelred of Rievaulx, in his work De spiritali amicitia ("Spiritual Friendship"), referred to the relationship of Jesus and John the Apostle as a "marriage" and held it out as an example sanctioning friendships between clerics, and let monks at his monastery in Yorkshire hold hands as an expression of affection.

James I of England may have been relying on a pre-existing tradition when he defended his relationship with George Villiers of Buckingham: "I wish to speak in my own behalf and not to have it thought to be a defect, for Jesus Christ did the same, and therefore I cannot be blamed. Christ had his son John, and I have my George." Frederick the Great wrote to similar effect in his 1748–1749 poem Palladium, which includes the lines: "This good Jesus, how do you think He got John to sleep in his bed? Can't you see he was his Ganymede?"

Others who have given voice to this interpretation of the relationship between Jesus and John have included the philosophers Denis Diderot and Jeremy Bentham. Gene Robinson, a bishop, discussed the possible homoerotic inclinations of Jesus in a sermon in 2005. Robinson's claim has been criticized, including by David W. Virtue, who editorialized by calling it an "appalling deconstructionism from the liberal lobby which will spin even the remotest thing to turn it into a hint that Biblical figures are gay".

Bob Goss, theologian and the author of Jesus Acted Up: A Gay and Lesbian Manifesto and Queering Christ: Beyond Jesus Acted Up, said the interaction between Jesus and John "is a pederastic relationship between an older man and a younger man. A Greek reader would understand." Theologian Ismo Dunderberg argues that the absence of accepted Greek terms for "lover" and "beloved" discounts an erotic reading. In contrast, the writer and theologian Robert Gagnon has argued that the Greek word translated as "loved" is agape (used, for example, in John 3:16: "for God so loved the world"), rather than the Greek word referring to sexual love, eros. On the other hand, Theodore W. Jennings Jr. notes that "eros does not occur either in the New Testament or in the Septuagint", and that these use agape to refer to "the love of a husband for his wife or even to the illicit loves of inordinate desire", including throughout the explicitly erotic Song of Solomon.

=== Naked youth ===
The Gospel of Mark 14:51–52 describes how in the Garden of Gethsemane, "A young man, wearing nothing but a linen garment, was following Jesus. When they [the Temple guards] seized him, he fled naked, leaving his garment behind." The text of the naked youth is puzzling for some authors; moreover, the text only appears in Mark, which has led some commentators to allege that Mark the Evangelist, traditionally held to be the author of the Gospel of Mark, was describing himself as the youth.

The separate and non-canonical Secret Gospel of Mark—fragments of which were contained in the controversial Mar Saba letter by Clement of Alexandria, which Morton Smith claimed to have discovered in 1958—states that Jesus during one night taught "the mystery of the kingdom of God" alone to a youth wearing only a linen cloth. This has been linked to the views of an ancient group called the Carpocratians. Some modern commentators interpret it as a baptism, others as some form of sexual initiation, and others as an allegory for a non-sexual initiation into a gnostic sect. However, the authorship of Secret Mark is still a matter of debate. Some scholars find it authentic, while others consider it to be Smith's forgery, while still others believe it to be apocryphon.

== Salvation as sexual union with Christ ==
The Bride of Christ is a metaphor for the Ecclesia, likening the relationship between Christians and Jesus to a betrothal pointing to a future wedding, when Christians are re-united with Jesus. In the Gospel of John (John 3:22–36), John the Baptist speaks in terms of himself as a "best man" with the implication that Christ the bridegroom (see also Matthew 9:15) is coming to meet his bride, although there is nothing specific to identify the bride. Church Fathers such as Cyprian applied the image to the Church. The Parable of the Ten Virgins also applies marital language to Christian eschatology and salvation.

A number of Christian sects such as the Brethren of the Free Spirit took to more directly describing salvation through Christ as an intimate or erotic union with Jesus, although this interpretation is widely condemned in mainstream theology.

The Children of God Christian cult actively promotes the view that a sexual relationship with Jesus would be desirable, encouraging devotees to imagine during sexual activity that it is Jesus who is having sex with them, and equate prophecy with Jesus' ejaculation.

== In culture ==
The Irish surrealist painter Colin Middleton depicted Jesus as androgynous in his Christ Androgyne (1943), currently in the Ulster Museum. Middleton added female characteristics to Christ's body, including one naked breast. The work can be interpreted as sexual, or as a general symbol of suffering humanity during World War II.

In Nikos Kazantzakis's novel The Last Temptation of Christ (1955), adapted as a film in 1988, Jesus has a vision of living his life as a married man.

The 1976 poem "The Love That Dares to Speak Its Name" by James Kirkup speculated what it would have been like if Jesus had had several sexual encounters with other men – including with Pontius Pilate, and a graphic description of Jesus' sexual encounter with a Roman soldier; Christian opposition to the poem's suggestions resulted in the Whitehouse v Lemon court case, a famous blasphemous libel trial.

In 2012, a Biblical hoax known as the Gospel of Jesus' Wife was used to claim early Christianity held Jesus to be married.

The Book of Longings, a 2020 novel by American author Sue Monk Kidd, follows a fictional wife of Jesus named Ana, inspired by the 2012 hoax. The two have sex regularly while they are together; however, their only child is stillborn, and the couple otherwise agrees to use contraceptives.

The perceived sadomasochism of the crucifixion has been commented upon and occasionally portrayed explicitly in modern art; for satirical reasons, this was depicted in the controversial Jesus with Erection poster, a concept which has also been depicted for serious reasons in sculpture by Terence Koh.

== See also ==
- Christianity and sexuality
- Cultural and historical background of Jesus
- David and Jonathan
- Historical Jesus
