= Assertiveness =

Capacity of being self-assured without being aggressive to defend a point of view

Assertiveness is the quality of being self-assured and confident without being aggressive to defend a right point of view or a relevant statement. In the field of psychology and psychotherapy, it is a skill that can be learned and a mode of communication. Dorland's Medical Dictionary defines assertiveness as:

a form of behavior characterized by a confident declaration or affirmation of a statement without need of proof; this affirms the person's rights or point of view without either aggressively threatening the rights of another (assuming a position of dominance) or submissively permitting another to ignore or deny one's rights or point of view.

Assertiveness is a communication skill that can be taught and the skills of assertive communication effectively learned.

Assertiveness is a method of critical thinking, where an individual speaks up in defense of their views or in light of erroneous information. Additionally, assertive people are capable of being outspoken and analyze information and point out areas of information lacking substance, details or evidence. Thus, it can be noted that assertiveness supports creative thinking and effective communication.

However, during the second half of the 20th century, assertiveness was increasingly singled out as a behavioral skill taught by many personal development experts, behavior therapists, and cognitive behavioral therapists. But now assertiveness is often linked to self-esteem. The term and concept was popularized to the general public by books such as Your Perfect Right: A Guide to Assertive Behavior (1970) by Robert Eating.

== Training ==
Joseph Wolpe initially explored the use of assertiveness as a means of "reciprocal inhibition" of anxiety, in his 1958 book on treating neurosis; and it has since been commonly employed as an intervention in behavior therapy. Assertiveness training was introduced by Andrew Salter (1961) and popularized by Joseph Wolpe. Wolpe's belief was that a person could not be both assertive and anxious at the same time, and thus being assertive would inhibit anxiety. The goals of assertiveness training include:

- increased awareness of personal rights
- differentiation between non-assertiveness and assertiveness
- differentiation between passive–aggressiveness and aggressiveness
- learning both verbal and non-verbal assertiveness skills.

As a communication style and strategy, assertiveness is thus distinguished from both aggression and passivity. How people deal with personal boundaries, including their own and those of other people, helps to distinguish between these three concepts. Passive communicators are not likely to try to influence anyone else because they fear social conflict. Because of this fear, passive communicators do not defend their own personal boundaries or ideas, and thus allow aggressive people to abuse or manipulate them. Additionally, they often hold in negative feelings such as anger because they allow this domination to happen. Aggressive people do not respect the personal boundaries of others and thus are liable to harm others by influencing them through personal attacks often taking the form of embarrassment. A person communicates assertively by clearly stating their thoughts and/or feelings in a nonaggressive manner, often in an effort to influence others; doing so in a way that respects the personal boundaries of the other person, or people, involved and avoids negative confrontation. Assertive people are also willing to defend themselves against aggressive people.

== Communication ==
Assertive communication involves respect for the boundaries of oneself and others. It also presumes an interest in the fulfillment of needs and wants through cooperation.

According to the textbook Cognitive Behavior Therapy (2008), "Assertive communication of personal opinions, needs, and boundaries has been ... conceptualized as the behavioral middle ground, lying between ineffective passive and aggressive responses". Such communication "emphasizes expressing feelings forthrightly, but in a way that will not spiral into aggression".

An individual may employ an assertive communication if others' actions threaten one's boundaries, one communicates this to prevent escalation.

In contrast, "aggressive communication" judges, threatens, lies, breaks confidences, stonewalls, and violates others' boundaries.

At the opposite end of the dialectic is "passive communication". Victims may passively permit others to violate their boundaries. At a later time, they may come back and attack with a sense of impunity or righteous indignation.

Assertive communication attempts to transcend these extremes by appealing to the shared interest of all parties; it "focuses on the issue, not the person". Aggressive and/or passive communication, on the other hand, may mark a relationship's end, and reduce self-respect.

== Characteristics ==
Assertive people tend to have the following characteristics:

- They feel free to express their feelings, thoughts, and desires.
- They are "also able to initiate and maintain comfortable relationships with [other] people"
- They know their rights.
- They have control over their anger. This does not mean that they repress this feeling. It means that they control anger and talk about it in a reasoning manner.
- "Assertive people ... are willing to compromise with others, rather than always wanting their own way ... and tend to have good self-esteem".

== Techniques ==
Techniques of assertiveness can vary widely. Manuel Smith, in his 1975 book When I Say No, I Feel Guilty, offered some of the following behaviors:

=== Broken record ===
The "broken record" technique consists of simply repeating your requests or your refusals every time you are met with resistance. The term comes from vinyl records, the surface of which when scratched would lead the needle of a record player to loop over the same few seconds of the recording indefinitely. "As with a broken record, the key to this approach is repetition ... where your partner will not take no for an answer."

A disadvantage with this technique is that when resistance continues, your requests may lose power every time you have to repeat them. If the requests are repeated too often, it can backfire on the authority of your words. In these cases, it is necessary to have some sanctions on hand.

=== Fogging ===
Fogging consists of finding some limited truth to agree with in what an antagonist is saying. More specifically, one can agree in part or agree in principle.

=== Negative inquiry ===
Negative inquiry consists of requesting further, more specific criticism.

=== Negative assertion ===
Negative assertion is agreement with criticism without letting up demand.

=== I-statements ===
I-statements can be used to voice one's feelings and wishes from a personal position without expressing a judgment about the other person or blaming one's feelings on them.

== Applications ==
Several research studies have identified assertiveness training as a useful tool in the prevention of alcohol-use disorders. Psychological skills in general including assertiveness and social skills have been posed as intervention for a variety of disorders with some empirical support.

In connection with gender studies, "Tannen argues that men and women would both benefit from learning to use the others' style. ... So, women would benefit from assertiveness training just as men might benefit from sensitivity training".

Regarding language revitalization and to avoid passive bilingualism phenomena, assertiveness has become a key discursive asset for speakers of minoritized languages. An example of this use is Mantinc el català, that aims to raise self-awareness in Catalan speakers about the importance of not shifting unconsciously and at first glance to Spanish in conversations with unknown people.

== Challenges ==
Assertiveness may be practiced in an unbalanced way, especially by those new to the process: "[One] problem with the concept of assertiveness is that it is both complex and situation-specific. ... Behaviors that are assertive in one circumstance may not be so in another". More particularly, while "unassertiveness courts one set of problems, over-assertiveness creates another." Assertiveness manuals recognize that "many people, when trying out assertive behavior for the first time, find that they go too far and become aggressive."

In the late 1970s and early 1980s, in the heyday of assertiveness training, some so-called assertiveness training techniques were distorted and "people were told to do some pretty obnoxious things in the name of assertiveness. Like blankly repeating some request over and over until you got your way". Divorced from respect for the rights of others, so-called assertiveness techniques could be psychological tools that might be readily abused: The line between repeatedly demanding with sanctions ("broken record") versus coercive nagging, emotional blackmail, or bullying, could be a fine one, and the caricature of assertiveness training as "training in how to get your own way ... or how to become as aggressive as the next person" was perpetuated.

== See also ==
- Persuasive writing – Technique used to convince a reader
