= Can Bonastre =

Winery in Masquefa, Anoia, Spain

- Native name: Finca Can Bonastre de Santa Magdalena
- Industry: Winery & Hotel
- Founded: 1548
- Headquarters: Crta. B-224 Km. 13.2, Masquefa, Anoia, Catalonia, Spain
- Website: www.canbonastre.com/en

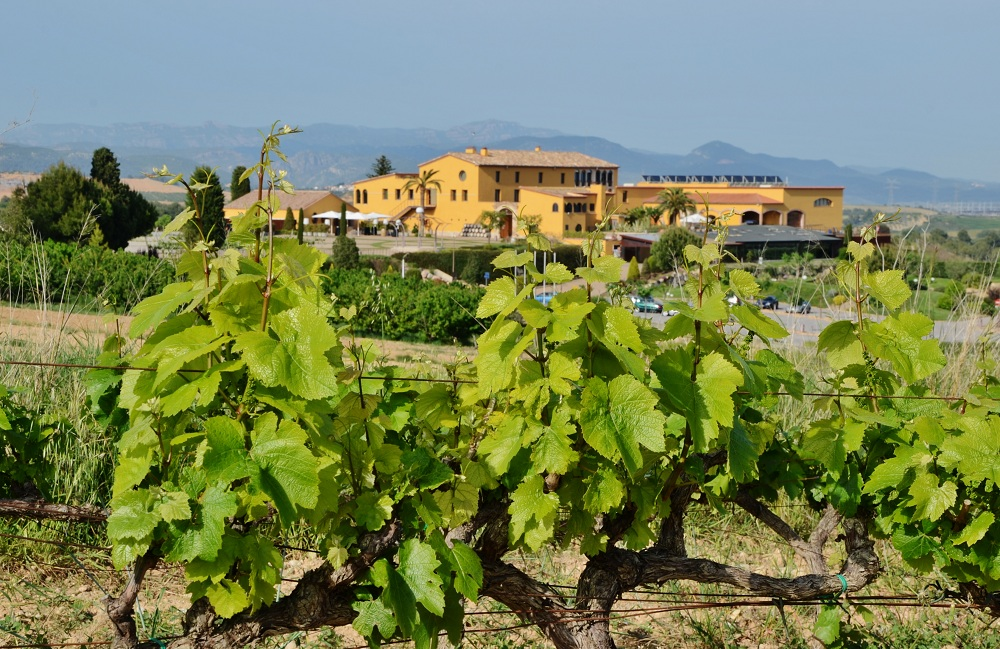
Can Bonastre

Can Bonastre is a traditional winery in Masquefa village, Anoia, Spain, founded in 1548 and located in the Can Bonastre de Santa Magdalena estate. According to tradition it is Masquefa's oldest farm.

Its area is about 100 hectares, of which 50 are vineyards of different varieties: chardonnay, sauvignon blanc, macabeo, riesling, pinot noir, merlot, cabernet sauvignon, tempranillo, cabernet franc, etc.

== See also ==
- List of oldest companies
