= Criticism of Netflix =

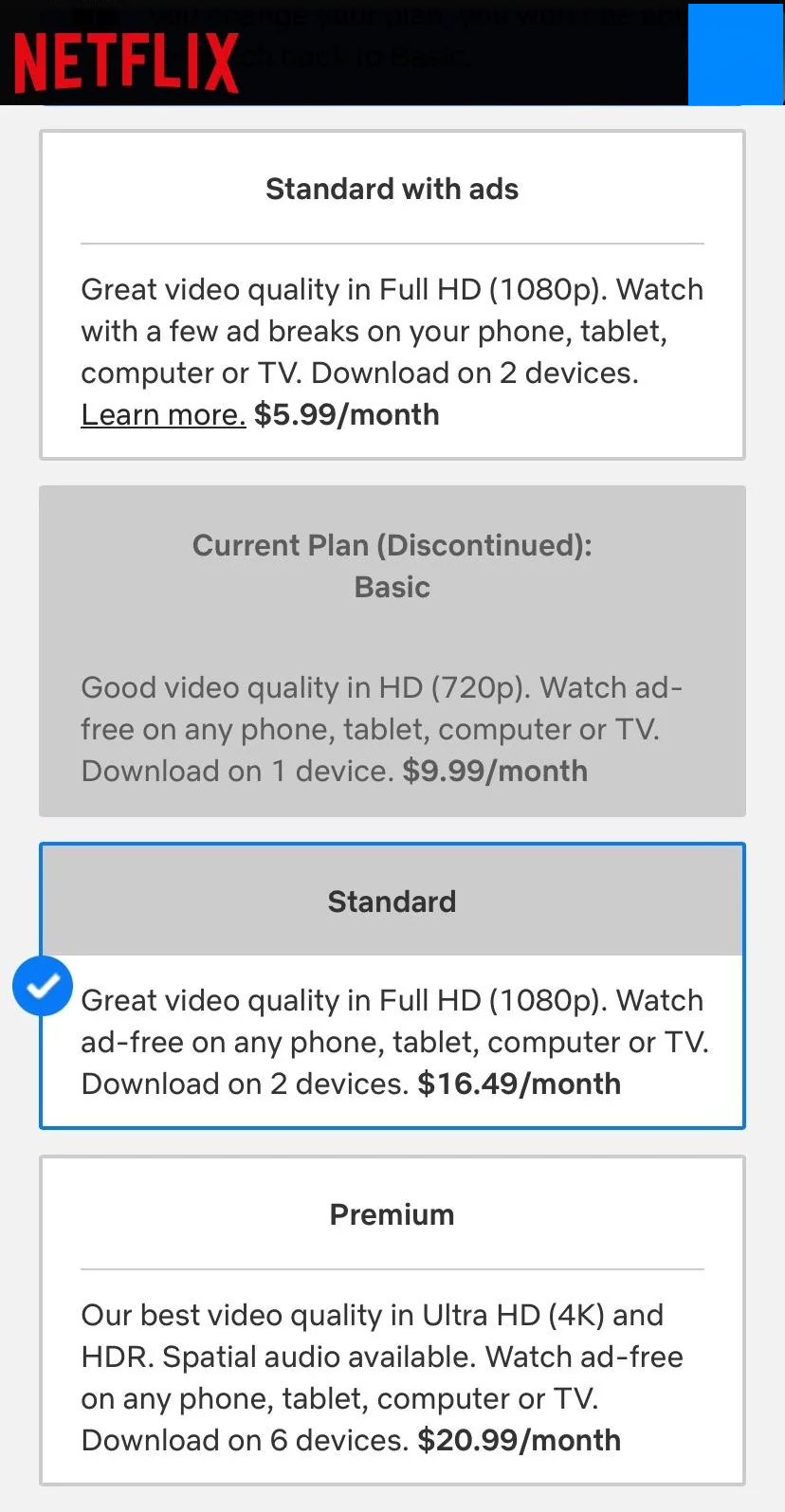
In 2024, Netflix discontinued its cheapest ad-free plan. Users who were on the plan would have to pay extra for the next cheapest ad-free plan.

Netflix is a subscription streaming service owned by the American company Netflix, Inc. Launched on August 29, 1997, it initially offered DVD rental and sale by mail, but the sales were eliminated within a year to focus on the DVD rental business. In 2007, the company began transitioning to its current subscription streaming model. Since its launch, the company was subject to numerous criticisms, the basis of which range from its business practices and workplace culture to issues with the service it provides, including content issues, lack of close captioning and pricing. This article provides an overview of key criticisms the company has faced.

== Artistic concerns ==
=== Film creator concern with allowing users to change playback speed ===
In October 2019, Netflix began to experiment with allowing users to change the speed at which content is being played, ranging from half the original speed, to up to one-and-a-half times faster the original speed. The feature was deployed to selected users of the service's Android app. The feature was criticized by various members of the film industry, who argued that it harmed the artistic integrity of their work. Netflix vice president Keela Robison stated that the feature "generated a fair amount of feedback – both for and against," and noted use cases for slowing down playback, such as helping viewers locate details in scenes, or making it easier to understand dialogue in foreign languages if they are still learning the language. Robison also noted that they had deliberately limited the rollout of the feature due to "creator concerns," and that such functions had already been available on DVD players.

=== Showing copyrighted subtitles of Bicycle Thieves ===
In 2015, Netflix and Cinedigm were sued by Corinth Films over its streaming of the 1948 Italian film Bicycle Thieves; although the film itself was considered public domain in the United States, distinct subtitling or dubbing of the film can still be considered a separate and copyrightable work. Corinth alleged that the specific version of the film, registered by Richard Feiner & Co. and owned by Corinth, was being licensed by Cinedigm to Netflix without permission. The parties later settled.

=== Eligibility for Academy Awards ===
Steven Spielberg, governor of the directive branch of the Academy of Motion Picture Arts and Sciences (AMPAS), has questioned the eligibility of Netflix's feature films for Academy Award nominations since films are released simultaneously in cinemas and via video on demand, in defiance of the standard three-month release window. While Netflix had previously given its theatrical acquisitions a simultaneous release in theaters and streaming, Roma was the first under a new policy to provide at least a three-week theatrical run before streaming release. According to the official rules of the Academy, a film only needs to be screened in the city of Los Angeles for seven days, with a minimum of three public showings per-day, to qualify for an Oscar nomination. However, the eligibility criteria do allow for simultaneous releases on non-theatrical platforms.

Spielberg complained that films "that are just given token qualifications in a couple of theaters for less than a week" shouldn't qualify. Following the 91st Academy Awards (during which Roma became the first film distributed by a streaming service to be nominated for Best Picture, and won Best Foreign Language Film and two other awards), a spokesperson for Spielberg's studio, Amblin Partners, stated that he "feels strongly about the difference between the streaming and theatrical situation," and would address the issue at the Academy's next board of governors meeting in April 2019.

Critics argued that Roma had an unfair advantage, singling out the service's wide availability, refusal to report box office numbers, disrespect of the industry's standard release windows with only three weeks of exclusive theatrical play (although it is not uncommon for some nominees to only receive the week-long minimum run), and excessive marketing spend (with reports ranging between $25 and $50 million, although its Oscars marketing was rolled into Netflix's overall marketing budget, which should not be). Due to its contravention of the standard three-month windows used by all major distributors, national cinema chains have refused to carry Netflix's theatrical releases. Netflix defended its distribution model, arguing that it was devoted to "[providing] access for people who can't always afford, or live in towns without, theaters. Letting everyone, everywhere enjoy releases at the same time. Giving filmmakers more ways to share art. These things are not mutually exclusive."

The U.S. Department of Justice warned the Academy that attempts to change its rules to discriminate against Netflix and other streaming platforms could violate antitrust law, as the parent companies of the traditional major studios (in particular, AT&T and Disney) have been making investments into streaming services that directly compete with Netflix.

In April 2019, the Academy voted against making any changes to its eligibility criteria, but AMPAS president John Bailey stated that the organization would study changes to the industry.

Spielberg missed the meeting due to his ongoing work on a remake of West Side Story. In a remark to The New York Times, Spielberg stated that while people should still have access to theatrical releases due to the communal experience that they provide, they should, at the same time, be able to "find their entertainment in any form or fashion that suits them," and that "what really matters to me is a great story and everyone should have access to great stories."

Beginning at the 2019 Toronto International Film Festival, films may now be restricted from screening at Scotiabank Theatre Toronto—one of the festival's main venues—and screened elsewhere (such as TIFF Bell Lightbox and other local cinemas) if distributed by a service such as Netflix. Organizers stated that the restriction was due to a policy enforced by the facility's owner and operator, Cineplex Entertainment, requiring adherence to three-month theatrical windows.

=== Quantity over quality ===
Netflix has increasingly offered large quantities of original content as part of its lineup. In 2021, it announced that the service would release a new original film each week. However, the outlet has been criticized by viewers and critics for the overall low quality of most of the output. One such critic, Hayley Campbell, commented on BBC Sounds' Must Watch podcast that one possible reason for Netflix's loss of subscribers in the 2020s is due to a lack of high-quality content on Netflix. She contrasted this with the Apple TV+ strategy of investing in a small number of high-quality projects, and with the focus of Amazon Prime Video on third-party content. Early employee Cindy Holland had compared Netflix acquiring DVDs to "shoveling coal in the side door of the house"; n+1 in 2025 was told of Netflix executives who greenlit projects without reading the scripts, and screenwriters ordered to have characters state their actions so viewers watching Netflix as a second screen know what is happening. The magazine described "a mind-numbing anticinema" style that appeared after the 2021 announcement, "the Typical Netflix Movie (TNM)":

From the outside, the TNM looks algorithmically constructed, as if designed to cater to each of Netflix's two thousand "taste clusters," the genre-like groupings Netflix uses to segment its audience, green-light programs, and recommend films and shows to subscribers. The TNM covers every niche interest and identity category in existence, such as a movie about a tall girl, Tall Girl, but also Horse Girl, Skater Girl, Sweet Girl, Lost Girls, and Nice Girls. Seemingly optimized for search engines, the title of a TNM announces exactly what it is — hence a romantic comedy about a wine executive called A Perfect Pairing, or a murder mystery called Murder Mystery. The opening credit sequence looks thrown together, as if its designer were playing roulette with Adobe templates in After Effects. A typical shot frames two characters, waist up, in profile as the camera slowly dollies across them, a slow and constant whir meant to inject motion into an otherwise inert frame. There is a preponderance of drone shots. The characters' dialogue is stilted, filled with overexplanation, clichés, and lingo no human would ever use, like two bots stuck in a loop.

"Every week Netflix seemed to deliver a new movie no one had ever heard of that somehow broke every viewing record in the world", n+1 wrote, because it releases little or no viewership data.

=== Netflix originals ===
Its distribution model for films labeled "Netflix originals" has led to conflicts with the legacy of the film industry. Some cinema chains have refused to screen films distributed theatrically by Netflix as the company's release method reduces or extinguishes standard release windows. After COVID-19 mandates forced theaters around the country to close for several months in 2020, the next year WarnerMedia, Disney and Universal each released films on their respective streaming services, HBO Max, Disney+, and Peacock, on the same day they were released in theaters.

=== Stylistic homogeneity ===
Some commentators have criticised Netflix for producing films and series that are stylistically homogenous. Josh Rosenberg of Esquire has argued that there is "a striking sameness to the streaming service's offerings." Some commentators have dubbed the term "Netflix lighting" to describe the similar lighting styles across Netflix content. Gita Jackson of Vice News has argued that "Although it's hard to pinpoint what exactly makes all Netflix shows look the same, a few things stand out: The image in general is dark, and the colors are extremely saturated; Especially in scenes at night, there tends to be a lot of colored lighting, making everything look like it's washed in neon even if the characters are inside; Actors look like the makeup is caked on their faces, and details in their costumes like puckering seams are unusually visible; Most annoying to me, everything is also shot in an extremely conventional way, using the most conventional set ups to indicate mystery or intrigue as possible—to indicate that something weird is going on the framing always has a dutch angle, for example—or more often just having everyone shot in a medium close up."

== Controversial content ==
=== Use of censored version of Back to the Future Part II ===
In May 2020, a scene from Back to the Future Part II involving the adult-magazine cover that Marty McFly discovers, and two lines from McFly, were censored, which led to criticism from film preservationists and fans. Netflix quickly restored the original scene after hearing the issue from co-writer Bob Gale, mentioning that it was apparently "a foreign version which he or Robert Zemeckis didn't even know existed, for some country that had a problem with the magazine cover". Netflix does not edit films and used a version that it received.

=== Use of footage from Lac-Mégantic rail disaster ===
In late 2018, Netflix faced criticism for its use of stock footage from the 2013 Lac-Mégantic rail disaster in multiple original productions, including the series Travelers, and the film Bird Box. In March 2019, the footage was replaced in both works.

=== Content critical of the Saudi Arabian government ===
In January 2019, Netflix censored an episode of Patriot Act with Hasan Minhaj in Saudi Arabia after requests by the Communications and Information Technology Commission, citing material critical of the Saudi government (such as Mohammed bin Salman and the Saudi-led intervention in Yemen).

=== Partnership with Liu Cixin ===
Netflix's partnership with Liu Cixin, including inviting Liu to join as a consulting producer for a show based on his The Three-Body Problem, raised questions from U.S. politicians. Citing an interview by The New Yorker in which Liu expressed support for Chinese government policies such as the one-child policy and the Xinjiang re-education camps, five U.S. senators wrote a letter to Netflix asking whether it was aware of Liu's remarks and demanding a justification for proceeding with the adaptation of Liu's work. Netflix responded that Liu was not the creator of the show, and that Liu's comments "are not reflective of the views of Netflix or of the show's creators, nor are they part of the plot or themes of the show". The letter points to the challenge of whether the U.S. entertainment industry can work with creators in China and tell their stories without accidentally promoting China's propaganda or becoming complicit in human rights abuses.

=== Depictions of suicide in 13 Reasons Why ===
The 2017 Netflix original series 13 Reasons Why about a teenager who commits suicide and leaves behind tapes explaining her action was criticized for romanticizing, sensationalizing, and increasing interest in suicide, and "glorified and glamorized" issues such as depression and post-traumatic stress disorder. The program was criticized by mental health professionals. The company was criticized for not abiding by its moral responsibility.

In the months after the show was released, suicide rates among young people spiked, although it was not clear if that was a result of the show.

In March 2018, Netflix added additional viewer advisories and provided links to suicide prevention resources.

On July 16, 2019, Netflix announced that it had edited the first-season finale of the series to remove the graphic scene that depicted the main character's suicide, while asserting that many young people were encouraged by the show to start conversations about depression and suicide and get help.

New Zealand's Classification Office created a new "RP18" rating (recommending parental guidance for viewers under 18) in response to 13 Reasons Why, arguing that although it contained graphic and objectionable portrayals of the act, "these issues need to be talked about in a way that is informed and safe – parents, guardians and other adults need to have open conversations with teens about the issues raised by the show."

=== Depiction of death camps in Poland ===
The makers of the 2019 documentary The Devil Next Door included a map made in 1985 which attempted to show where Nazi death camps stood relative to modern Polish borders. In response to complaints by Prime Minister Mateusz Morawiecki, Netflix agreed to insert additional text emphasizing that such camps were in occupied territory. This move was criticized for potentially legitimizing the Act on the Institute of National Remembrance, a 2018 Polish law that restricts how one may refer to the Holocaust.

=== Depictions of Jesus in The First Temptation of Christ and The Last Hangover ===
In December 2019, Netflix announced a special titled The First Temptation of Christ, which depicts Jesus as a homosexual figure who has a relationship with an atheist named Orlando. The series is a work of Porta dos Fundos, a Brazilian comedy group who became prominent through online media. The depiction of a homosexual Jesus and the scenes in which Mary is seen smoking marijuana caused outrage by many Netflix users in Brazil and resulted in requests by the Christian community in Brazil to suspend the series from the platform. Jesus' drunken depiction in The Last Hangover, also a work by Porta dos Fundos, in which Jesus's disciples wake up after a Last Supper raging party, has also caused controversy and was removed from the platform in Singapore.

=== Depictions of smoking ===
A July 2019 report by the anti-tobacco group Truth Initiative highlighted the amount of smoking portrayed in House of Cards and Orange Is the New Black as higher than on broadcast television, and noted nearly double the number of references to smoking between season 1 and season 2 of Stranger Things. In response to the report, Netflix stated it will make efforts to cut back on the depiction of smoking in its original series.

=== Content that promotes pseudoscience ===
In February 2019, Gwyneth Paltrow's lifestyle brand Goop, which has been criticized for making unsubstantiated claims about the effectiveness of the health treatments and products it promotes, signed a deal to produce a wellness-themed documentary series for Netflix. Critics argued that Netflix's move was "a win for pseudoscience." Once The Goop Lab was available for review, numerous media outlets published harsh criticism of Netflix's decision to promote Goop. Wired UK wrote several reviews critical of both The Goop Lab, and of Netflix for creating it, saying "Think Goop is bad? It's only the tip of Netflix's pseudoscience iceberg".

The accusations resurfaced later in 2020 with the addition of another Netflix Original, Down to Earth with Zac Efron. Writing for McGill University's Office for Science and Society, Jonathan Jarry argued the show is basically an advertisement for Darin Olien and the pseudoscience he espouses, from cancer-preventing superfoods to self-pasteurized raw goat milk. Jarry states that "the show consistently uses genuine ecological concerns to make us accept claims that do not hold water."

Previously, Netflix had been criticized for offering content by independent producers that presents wellness pseudoscience and conspiracy theories as true. Health professionals have quickly corrected several arguments made by the 2017 documentary What the Health, arguing the movie exaggerates the negative effects of eating eggs and downplays the risks of a diet rich in sugar.

The Australian Medical Association (AMA) called on Netflix to remove The Magic Pill from its catalog, a documentary narrated by celebrity chef Pete Evans claiming a ketogenic diet helps cure a variety of diseases, such as asthma and cancer. While some studies hint that some benefits can be gained from the diet, they did not support the claims made in the movie and the AMA insisted that promoting the diet without the supervision of qualified health professionals posed grave risks of developing nutritional deficiencies.

=== Sexualization of children in Cuties ===
Cuties, a 2020 French film distributed internationally by Netflix, drew controversy after its release due to claims it sexualized children, particularly in response to the poster originally displayed on the streaming platform, which displayed actors, some of whom were as young as 12 and were using pacifiers, in booty shorts and midriff-exposing tops, striking provocative dance poses.

Netflix tried to minimize public backlash by suppressing the film in search results prior to its release.

Politicians and government officials in Turkey and the United States made various complaints, including calling for the investigation of "possible violations of child exploitation and child pornography laws" and asking for the film to be voluntarily removed by Netflix. U.S. Senator Josh Hawley of Missouri informally invited Netflix to discuss the film "before Congress" in a tweet. U.S. Senator Mike Lee of Utah sent a letter directly to Netflix CEO Reed Hastings, and requested "an explanation on [Hasting's] views as to whether or not the potential exploitation of minors in this film constitutes criminal behavior". U.S. House Representative and former Democratic primary contender Tulsi Gabbard of Hawaii explicitly called the film "child porn" and that it would "whet the appetite of pedophiles [and] help fuel the child sex trafficking trade." U.S. Senator Ted Cruz of Texas sent a letter to the Department of Justice to "investigate whether Netflix, its executives, or the filmmakers violated any federal laws against the production and distribution of child pornography."

Christine Pelosi, daughter of U.S. House Speaker Nancy Pelosi, stated that Cuties "hypersexualizes girls my daughter's age no doubt to the delight of pedophiles like the ones I prosecuted." Senator Tom Cotton of Arkansas and Representative Jim Banks of Indiana also both criticised the film in separate statements calling for the DOJ to take legal action against Netflix, with Cotton saying "There's no excuse for the sexualization of children, and Netflix's decision to promote the film 'Cuties' is disgusting at best and a serious crime at worst". Representatives Ken Buck of Colorado and Andy Biggs of Arizona also called for the Department of Justice to investigate. The state attorneys general of Ohio, Florida, Louisiana, and Texas also asked for removal of the film.

The director of the film, Maïmouna Doucouré, stated in defense of the film that it "tries to show that our children should have the time to be children, and we as adults should protect their innocence and keep them innocent as long as possible." She also stated, "The problem, of course, is that they [preteens] are not women, and they don't realize what they are doing.... The girls [portrayed in the film performing in the local dance contest] don't have the maturity, however, to realize what their gestures and dance moves look like to the audience."

On September 23, 2020, Netflix was indicted by a Texas grand jury for "promotion of lewd visual material depicting a child".

=== Jokes about the transgender community in Dave Chapelle's The Closer ===
Netflix was criticized for purchasing the rights to The Closer, a special by Dave Chappelle.

Two transgender Netflix employees filed a complaint against Netflix with the National Labor Relations Board, alleging the company retaliated against them for speaking out against the comedian's most recent special.

=== Politically sensitive content ===
Netflix has encountered political controversy after its global expansion and for some of its international productions, including The Mechanism, which depicted a political kickbacks scandal in Brazil, Fauda, for its sympathetic depiction of Israel Defense Forces commandos as well as for its sympathetic depiction of Hamas militants and Amo, which portrays Rodrigo Duterte's hugely controversial drug war.

Netflix has been accused of pushing liberal political ideology through their original movies and series by conservatives. In 2019, Netflix faced pressure to stop filming in Northern Ireland in light of the country's strict abortion laws.

=== Obeyed content takedown requests by governments ===
In February 2020, the company released its first report of compliance with government-requested content takedowns in countries, a total of 9 times since its launch:

- In Singapore, requests to take down Cooking on High, The Legend of 420, and Disjointed in 2018, The Last Temptation of Christ in 2019, and The Last Hangover in 2020.
- In Germany, a request to take down the 1990 remake of Night of the Living Dead in 2017.
- In Vietnam, a request to take down Full Metal Jacket in 2017.
- In New Zealand, a request to take down the film The Bridge in 2015. The film is deemed objectionable by the country's Office of Film and Literature Classification.
- In Saudi Arabia, a request to take down an episode criticizing the country's government from the series Patriot Act with Hasan Minhaj in 2019, which drew criticism in the media.

=== Censorship laws in India ===
In India, Netflix along with Disney's Hotstar announced plans in early 2019 to adopt self-regulation guidelines for content streamed on its platforms within the country in an effort to prevent potential implementation of government censorship laws.

=== Showing females without hijabs in Jordan in Jinn ===
The Jordanian series Jinn was condemned by members of the country's government for alleged "immoral scenes," including showing females without hijabs and young people kissing. The country's highest prosecutor has sought to have the series banned from streaming.

=== Depiction of LGBTQ characters in Turkey ===
Netflix was ordered by the television watchdog of Turkey, Radio and Television Supreme Council (RTÜK) to remove LGBTQ characters from its Turkish original series Love 101 and The Protector. Netflix subsequently cancelled the ongoing production of its Turkish series If Only when ordered to remove a gay character.

=== Depiction of Cleopatra ===
In 2023, Netflix announced the second installment of the African Queens docuseries, subtitled Queen Cleopatra. The series received criticism upon the trailer release as Adele James, a black woman, was cast as Cleopatra, a Greek-Macedonian woman, instead of a white woman. The series was accused of "falsifying history" and a petition on Change.org reached 85,000 signatures in two days before being shut down by the site's administrators. Netflix faced criticism on Twitter, with social media users accusing the series of Afrocentrism and saying that the "theft" of Greek and Egyptian cultures was continuing on Netflix. Zahi Hawass, the Egyptian Minister of Tourism and Antiquities and Egyptologist, called Netflix's portrayal of Cleopatra "completely fake" and said that the producers are "trying to stir up confusion to spread false information". Egyptian lawyer Mahmoud al-Semary filed a lawsuit against Netflix in April 2023, calling the depiction Afrocentric and a "crime". Al-Semary seeks to have Netflix discontinued in Egypt and for Netflix's management team to be investigated for the series.

=== Depiction of African-Americans in Good Times: Black Again ===
On May 13, 2024, CEMOTAP co-chairs Dr. James McIntosh and Betty Dopson sent an open letter of "outrage" to Ted Sarandos condemning the show for its portrayal of Black people as unintelligent, violent, simian, and hypersexual; and its usage of obscenity, pedophilia, slurs, drug-dealing, and weaponry. They claimed it had "only the most superficial and negative relationship to the original Good Times TV series", as well as criticizing its disrespectful references to Rosa Parks; the Christian God; Jesus Christ; and the Egyptian God Anubis. They drew parallels with Seth MacFarlane's previous controversial depictions of Harriet Tubman. CEMOTAP urged members of the public to call Netflix and cancel their subscriptions, boycotting Netflix until the show is taken off the streaming service, and for an equal amount of time afterwards.

On June 5, 2024, CEMOTAP led a demonstration at the Netflix Corporate office on Broadway in Manhattan. In December of that year, CEMOTAP passed out leaflets outside of the Netflix office in New York. They asked the public to call NBA commissioner Adam Silver "regarding his double standard" for punishing Kyrie Irving for tweeting a link to the anti-Semitic film Hebrews to Negroes: Wake Up Black America "while saying nothing to Stephen Curry, who is the executive producer" of Black Again.

=== Women-targeted insults in The Big Bang Theory ===
In March 2023, Mithun Vijay Kumar, a political activist in India sued Netflix India for streaming an episode of sitcom The Big Bang Theory in which a character played by Kunal Nayyar allegedly calls actress Madhuri Dixit "a leprous prostitute." Many people online trolled Netflix for streaming the episode containing the insulting dialogue. Kumar expressed that online streaming platforms like Netflix should be held accountable for their actions.

== Corporate affairs ==
=== Employee poaching ===
In September 2016, Netflix was sued by 20th Century Fox for tortious interference, alleging that the company "unlawfully target[ed], recruit[ed], and poach[ed] valuable Fox executives by illegally inducing them to break their employment contracts with Fox to work at Netflix." The suit in particular referred to Netflix's hiring of Tara Flynn and Marco Waltenberg, who were still under contract with Fox. In October 2016, Netflix filed a counter-suit against 20CF, alleging that the fixed-term contracts being used by Fox were in violation of the California Business and Professions Code, for "facilitating and enforcing a system that restrains employee mobility, depresses compensation levels, and creates unlawful barriers to entry for Netflix and others competing in the film and television production business". Netflix described the agreement as "a form of involuntary servitude". Viacom sued Netflix for the same reason in October 2018, over its hiring of Momita SenGupta.

In June 2019, a judge issued a tentative ruling holding that Netflix "intentionally interfered with Fox's contracts with Waltenberg and Flynn" to "further its own economic interest at Fox's expense," but that Fox had failed to present any evidence of actual damages against the company. The case was to go to trial in January 2020. In December 2019, the judge issued a final ruling barring Netflix from soliciting employees under fixed-term employment contracts with Fox, or inducing them to violate such contracts.

=== Firing of Jonathan Friedland for saying nigger ===
In June 2018, Netflix CCO Jonathan Friedland was fired for saying the word nigger during a company meeting about offensive words. A memo released by Reed Hastings, which stated that he should have used a euphemism, mentioned that Friedland said the word again during a follow-up meeting with human resources. Hastings described the second utterance as "confirm[ing] a deep lack of understanding". Days later, an advertising campaign for Netflix launched, which emphasized its black talent.

=== Insider trading ring ===
In 2021, five Netflix employees were charged with insider trading by the SEC. The group was accused of using insider information to trade ahead of 13 earnings announcements between 2016 and 2019. The ring had netted $3.1M in profits.

In December 2021, former Netflix engineer Sung Mo Jun was sentenced to 2 years in prison for an insider trading scheme where he leaked subscriber numbers in advance of official releases.

=== Tax avoidance ===
According to a blog post by the Institute on Taxation and Economic Policy, Netflix reported its largest ever profit in the US for 2018, but paid nothing in federal or state tax. The explanation is that US Tax law allows companies to claim tax credit on foreign earnings and thus avoid double taxation. US Senator Bernie Sanders has criticized Netflix for this both on Twitter and at a Fox News town hall event on April 15, 2019. A spokesperson from Netflix has addressed such claims as "inaccurate," but no evidence has been provided that Netflix did pay any state or federal taxes in 2018.

In October 2019, allegations of tax evasion were investigated by Italian prosecutors. While Netflix doesn't have a headquarters in Italy, the prosecution claims that the digital infrastructure such as servers and cables amounts to a physical presence in the country.

In January 2020, Netflix was accused of funneling $430 million of profits into tax havens.

in February 2020, according to Labour MP Margaret Hodge, Netflix allegedly should have paid over £13 million in UK tax in 2019 but "deliberately avoided" doing so. Netflix said it complies with the rules of countries in which it operates.

In August 2020, Netflix was one of 21 international companies being investigated for allegedly evading tax in South Korea.

=== Throttling of DVDs by mail ===
Netflix's DVD allocation policy – referred to by many as "throttling" – gave priority shipping and selection to customers who rent fewer discs per month. Higher volume renters may see some of their selections delayed, routed elsewhere, or sent out of order. Netflix claimed that the large majority of subscribers are able to receive their movies in about one business day following our shipment of the requested movie from their local distribution center. However, not all shipments came from the subscriber's local distribution center, and shipments from distant centers were often delayed, as well.

In September 2004, a consumer class action lawsuit, Frank Chavez v. Netflix, Inc., was brought against Netflix in San Francisco Superior Court. The suit alleged false advertising in relation to claims of "unlimited rentals" with "one-day delivery." In January 2005, Netflix changed its terms of use to acknowledge "throttling". In October 2005, Netflix proposed a settlement for those who had enrolled as a paid Netflix member prior to January 15, 2005. These earlier members would be able to renew their subscriptions with a one-month free membership, and those early members with current subscriptions would receive a one-month free upgrade to the next-highest membership level. Netflix's settlement denied allegations of any wrongdoing, and the case did not reach a legal judgment. A controversial aspect of the settlement offer was that the customer's account would continue at the renewed or upgraded membership level after the free month provided by the settlement, with customers being charged accordingly unless they opted out after the month-long free period ended. After Trial Lawyers for Public Justice filed a challenge to the proposed settlement and the Federal Trade Commission filed an amicus brief urging the rejection or modification of the settlement, Netflix offered to alter the settlement terms, requiring customers to actively approve any continuation after the free month. The settlement was affirmed on April 21, 2008.

The summary notice and long-form notice together provided all of the detail required by statute or court rule, in a highly accessible form. The fact that not all of the information was contained in a single e-mail or mailing is immaterial ... Using a summary notice that directed the class member wanting more information to a Web site containing a more detailed notice, and provided hyperlinks to that Web site, was a perfectly acceptable manner of giving notice in this case ... The class members conducted business with defendant over the Internet, and can be assumed to know how to navigate between the summary notice and the Web site. Using the capability of the Internet in that fashion was a sensible and efficient way of providing notice, especially compared to the alternative Vogel apparently preferred—mailing out a lengthy legalistic document that few class members would have been able to plow through.

The settlement was criticized because it paid out $2.5 million to attorneys for fees and costs, while offering only coupons to the class members.

The Terms of Use were later amended with terms that indicate such a suit would not be possible in the future:

These Terms of Use shall be governed by and construed in accordance with the laws of the state of Delaware, without regard to conflicts of laws provisions. You and Netflix agree that the United States District Court for the Northern District of California and/or the California Superior Court for the County of Santa Clara shall have exclusive jurisdiction over any dispute between you and Netflix relating in any way to the Netflix service or Web site or these Terms of Use. You and Netflix expressly and irrevocably consent to personal jurisdiction and venue in these courts. The parties agree that in any such dispute or subsequent legal action, they will only assert claims in an individual (non-class, non-representative) basis, and that they will not seek or agree to serve as a named representative in a class action or seek relief on behalf of those other than themselves.

The Netflix website at one time featured a list of titles, "Releasing This Week" (RTW), that enabled customers to easily view new DVDs the company planned for rental release each week. On December 21, 2007, the company removed the link to the page without notice and replaced it with a slider system showing only four previously released movies at a time. The new page, called "Popular New Releases," does not list newly released DVDs for rental. The listing of new releases was still active, although there was a menu option that links to the page. On January 1, 2008, a Netflix employee unofficially stated on the Netflix Community Blog that customers used the RTW page to add newly released movies to the top of their queues, then complained about delays in receiving them after demand outstripped the supply of DVDs on hand. By removing the page, Netflix sought to quell complaints that these movies were not readily available. Critics, however, suggested this was just another Netflix attempt at throttling.

=== Selective release of viewership information and calculation methodology of viewership numbers ===
Netflix has been criticised by some media organizations and competitors for only rarely and selectively releasing its ratings and viewer numbers. A notable instance of this involves the film Bird Box. A week after its release, Netflix claimed that it had the biggest seven-day viewing record of any of its original films at over 45 million viewers, but did not provide data to validate it. It also was not possible to accurately compare its week-long success to a major cultural event such as the Super Bowl or Academy Awards or to a blockbuster film run. In June 2019, Netflix claimed that 30,869,863 accounts watched the Adam Sandler- and Jennifer Aniston-starring Netflix original film Murder Mystery, despite it being critically panned, making it the biggest "opening weekend" for a Netflix original film. If the film had been in theaters it would have made the equivalent of $556 million based on a $9 ticket price. Critics cast doubt that this number of people would have watched the film given that it would have made the film more popular than the finale of Game of Thrones.

In the fourth quarter of 2019, Netflix changed the method it used to estimate viewers for a show. Before this, Netflix counted a viewer towards viewership if they watched 70% of the show; with the change, a viewer need only watch two minutes of the show to count. Netflix started the two-minute metric indicated that the viewer chose to watch the show, and thus counted in its viewership. This also eliminated factors such as the length of the work, so that both short and long works would be treated equally. In a statement to shareholders, Netflix estimated this increased viewership by 35% on average. This new metric was criticized as commentators felt two minutes was far too little of any show to engage a viewer, and instead the move by Netflix was to artificially increase viewership to put their numbers on par with television networks and movie ticket sales, such as trying to compare viewership of The Witcher with that of HBO's Game of Thrones.

In October 2021, Netflix agreed to release more viewership information and changed its viewership metrics to measuring the number of hours that a show was watched including rewatches, which the company said was closer to the measurements used in linear broadcast television.

=== Workplace culture ===
Netflix grants all employees extremely broad discretion with respect to business decisions, expenses, and vacation—but in return expects consistently high performance, as enforced by what is known as the "keeper test." All supervisors are expected to constantly ask themselves if they would fight to keep an employee. If the answer is no, then it is time to let that employee go. A slide from an internal presentation on Netflix's corporate culture summed up the test as: "Adequate performance gets a generous severance package." Such packages reportedly range from four months' salary in the United States to as much as six months in the Netherlands.

The company offers unlimited vacation time for salaried workers and allows employees to take any amount of their paychecks in stock options.

About the culture that results from applying such a demanding test, Hastings has said that "You gotta earn your job every year at Netflix," and, "There's no question it's a tough place...There's no question it's not for everyone." Hastings has drawn an analogy to athletics: professional athletes lack long-term job security because an injury could end their career in any particular game, but they learn to put aside their fear of that constant risk and focus on working with great colleagues in the current moment.

=== Digital rights management ===
Use of digital rights management (DRM) by Netflix has been criticized by Defective by Design and Free Software Foundation. The digital restrictions have impeded viewing for paying subscribers. For example, a 2019 update to Netflix dropped support for certain Samsung and Roku devices because they predate Microsoft's PlayReady DRM.

=== Carl Erik Rinsch lawsuit ===
On March 20, 2025, it was reported that Hollywood filmmaker Carl Erik Rinsch was charged with money laundering and successfully sued by Netflix for $11 Million.

== Consumer-related ==
=== Allowing users to bypass geo-blocking ===
As of November 2013, Canadian Netflix offered 3,600 titles compared to the U.S. service which had more than 10,000 and so Canadians used VPNs so they can access the larger U.S. content selection. As of 2015, more than 30 million Netflix subscribers used the service via a proxy server or virtual private network (VPN); doing so can make a user appear to be located in a country other than the one they are actually in, thus allowing them to circumvent geo-blocking and use the service to access content that Netflix does not offer in their region, due to geographical licensing restrictions. It is unclear whether accessing geo-blocked content via VPN violates local copyright laws, but content providers and other broadcasters have asserted that it is illegal because it infringes local rights to content that may have been sold to a competitor. GlobalWebIndex showed about 20 million of such VPN users came from China alone.

In a leaked e-mail revealed by the Sony Pictures Entertainment hack in 2014, Sony Pictures Television's president of international distribution, Keith LeGoy, described VPN usage of Netflix as being "semi-sanctioned" piracy, and he criticized the company for not taking further steps to detect these users and restrict their access to content Netflix had not licensed for their region.

On January 14, 2016, Netflix announced its intent to strengthen measures to restrict access to unlicensed material, by viewers using VPNs or proxies.

=== Release of customer data during a competition ===
In 2006, Netflix held the first Netflix Prize competition to find a better program to predict user preferences and beat its existing Netflix movie recommendation system, known as Cinematch, by at least 10%. CEO Hastings did not necessarily expect a lot of quick progress towards the prize, "We thought we built the best darn thing ever." But by June 2007, Hastings said the competition is "three-quarters of the way there in three-quarters of a year." Three teams – an AT&T Research Team called BellKor, commendo's team BigChaos, and Pragmatic Theory – combined to win the 2009 grand prize competition for $1 million. The winning team, called BellKor's Pragmatic Chaos, used machine learning techniques to find that, for example, the rating system people use for older movies is very different from that used for a movie they just saw. The mood of the day made a difference also; for example, Friday ratings were different from Monday morning ratings.

In 2010, Netflix canceled a running contest to improve the company's recommendation algorithm due to privacy concerns: under the terms of the competition, contestants were given access to customer rental data, which the company had purportedly anonymized. However, it was discovered that even this anonymized dataset could, in fact, identify a user personally. Netflix was sued by KamberLaw L.L.C. in Doe v Netflix and ended the contest after reaching a deal with the FTC.

=== Inadequate closed captioning ===
In June 2011, the National Association of the Deaf represented by the Disability Rights Education and Defense Fund (DREDF) filed a lawsuit against Netflix under the Americans with Disabilities Act over a lack of subtitles. In October 2012, the parties agreed to a settlement under which Netflix agreed to pay $755,000 in legal fees, provide closed captioning for its entire library by 2014, and have captions available for all new content within 7 days by 2016. In April 2015, the United States Court of Appeals for the Ninth Circuit issued an unpublished decision ruling that the ADA did not apply to Netflix in this case, as it is "not connected to any actual, physical place" and thus not a "place of public accommodation" that applies to the Act.

In July 2012, Netflix formed an experimental project to crowdsource the closed-captioning effort using the Amara (formerly Universal Subtitles) platform. However, this proved problematic in the face of claims that crowdsourced subtitles, regardless of whether they are transcriptions or translations, are derivative works and were considered copyright infringement if created or distributed without consent from the film's copyright owner. Amara operates under DMCA safe-harbor provisions which indemnify it from secondary copyright infringement lawsuits over user-uploaded content, and presumably Netflix would not publish any subtitles produced by this effort without authorization. Netflix stated it is not committed to using any subtitles produced by the crowdsourcing project. In October 2012, Netflix offered the television series Andromeda to customers in Finland with unauthorized subtitles from the fansub scene. When confronted, Netflix apologized and promised to remove the unauthorized translations but did not explain how the content came to be offered in the first place, or whether other potentially copyright-infringing subtitles existed.

Netflix has been criticized over the quality of subtitles on some of its content and original productions; the service's video player contains a function allowing users to report issues with captioning. In one notable instance in 2018, Queer Eye contained sentences of dialogue missed by the subtitles, and censoring of expletives that were not censored in the audio. Netflix corrected these subtitles after receiving criticism via social media.

=== Removal of social networking feature ===
Beginning in 2004, Netflix subscribers could use "Netflix Friends," social networking service feature to interact with friends who were also members. Users could see how their friends rated a movie on that movie's page, view what DVDs their friends were renting, and allow them to leave their friends notes with film recommendations. In March 2010, as part of a redesign of its movie-details pages, the Friends feature began to be phased out. Users could no longer see their friends' ratings on movie pages, and what remained of the friends section was moved to a small link at the bottom of each page. Angry users posted negative comments and the feedback prompted Netflix's Vice President of Product Management, Todd Yellin, to post a follow-up statement. While apologizing for poor communication about the changes, Yellin stated that the Friends feature would continue to be phased out, stating that only 2% of members used the feature and the company had limited resources to maintain the service.

=== Price increase complaint ===
In June 2016, a Netflix subscriber sued the company over price increases, alleging he was told by a Netflix customer support representative in 2011 that he would pay the same price in perpetuity as long as he maintained his subscription continuously. The plaintiff voluntarily dismissed the case in July 2016.

=== Privacy rights lawsuit ===
In 2013, Netflix paid $9M to settle a consumer privacy lawsuit. Allegedly, the company had illegally retained and used the rental histories of individual subscribers for a period of two years.

== Language discrimination ==
Since 2020, several studies, organizations and social movements mostly from Europe have protested language discrimination in Netflix's browsing interface, the searching algorithms, and content catalogues.

This alleged language discrimination is most noted for the official, non-official and minority languages in Spain. However, criticism has also been equally raised for Welsh, Icelandic and for India's many indigenous languages.

"If it's not in Catalan, delete Netflix". A poster from the June 2022 boycott campaign against Netflix for its alleged language discrimination of Catalan.

Netflix has been criticized in Spain for the non-inclusion of other languages in Spain such as Catalan, Basque, Galician, Aranese Occitan, and Asturian.

A study by the Catalan-language NGO Plataforma per la Llengua had concluded in 2020 that of 2,092 video products surveyed, 327 had already been dubbed in Catalan previously but such versions were not made available by Netflix. Only 30 out of the 6,034 streaming products were available in Catalan on the Spanish Netflix catalogue by early 2022, which represented only 0.5% of the total content.

In 2021, the Spanish government passed a new audiovisual law stating that at least 6% of the total content of a provider must be made available in Catalan, Basque or Galician. However, the law was criticized for excluding major foreign broadcasters such as Netflix, HBO, Amazon Prime or Disney+, meaning only domestic streaming companies were affected by the quota.

In response to the controversy, Netflix announced in March 2022 that it would publish a total of 70 new titles (dubbed or subtitled) in Catalan, Basque, and Galician yearly. The decision was applauded by the Government of Catalonia, which recognized ongoing negotiations with the streaming company. Nonetheless, this compromise was still considered unsatisfactory by Plataforma per la Llengua.

In June 2022, a self-organized online campaign by the Catalan-speaking community led by linguist Carme Junyent i Figueras and organizations such as Mantinc el català declared a boycott and asked people to cancel their Netflix subscriptions by June 23, coinciding with the National Day of the Catalan Countries. Aside from the lack of content, the campaigners also criticized the lack of available language options for the user interface allowing users to search for titles in their own language. The boycott gained momentum on Twitter with numerous people claiming to have unsubscribed from the service in support. By June 28, Netflix released 12 more titles in Catalan to the platform which were also made available internationally.

== Technical issues ==
=== Stress on broadband networks ===
On March 18, 2020, Thierry Breton, the European Commissioner for Internal Market and Services urged streaming services including Netflix to cut back their service to limit the stress on Europe's broadband networks. The COVID-19 lockdowns increased pressure on the networks with people both working and looking for entertainment at home. Netflix agreed to reduce its streaming rate in the European Union by 25% for 30 days, while allowing users to stream in HD and 4K with reduced image quality.

=== Live events ===
In April 2023, Netflix began to occasionally stream live events, beginning with Chris Rock's stand-up comedy special Selective Outrage. Several of these events have faced technical issues on the platform; a Love is Blind season 4 live reunion special on April 16, 2023, was delayed due to unspecified technical problems, with users reporting various errors. After announcing a 90 minute delay, Netflix eventually called off the live broadcast and announced that the special would instead be released as-live the following day. Netflix faced similar capacity issues during the Jake Paul vs. Mike Tyson boxing event on November 15, 2024, with many users reporting issues with buffering and downtime during the stream.

=== Linux support ===
Netflix formerly supported online streaming only on Microsoft Windows, macOS, iOS, and Android, relying on Microsoft Silverlight. This was partly due to digital rights management issues. This created problems for users of fully open-source versions of Linux and similar operating systems. Though Google's partially proprietary Android and ChromeOS platforms are essentially based upon Linux and other free software infrastructure, Netflix did not provide any crossover support for using its proprietary components to stream any of its content upon more free systems, such as Ubuntu and Fedora, although this changed in October 2014.

On August 9, 2011, Netflix released a Google Chrome web store item for ChromeOS, Mac OS, and Windows; however, it did not initially enable Netflix streaming on Linux machines. On Linux systems running the Chrome browser, the extension simply redirected users to view Netflix.com. In June 2014, Netflix switched from Silverlight to HTML5 playback using Encrypted Media Extensions (EME); the extensions were added to Microsoft's Internet Explorer on Windows 8.1 and Apple's Safari on OS X Yosemite and Google Chrome. Versions of Linux including Ubuntu and PCLinuxOS now offer support for Netflix in Google Chrome version 37 or newer. Users of other Linux distributions such as version 17 of Linux Mint have been successfully using Netflix via Google Chrome without any special workarounds. Google initially released plans for a plugin for the Chrome browser and ChromeOS which would allow Netflix streaming, including traditional Linux users. On November 15, 2012, patches to the Wine compatibility layer to make viewing of Netflix on Linux and similar systems were made available. On November 18, 2012, a PPA and installation files were made publicly available making the installation and use of Netflix much easier for users of Ubuntu 12.04 and possibly other distributions. On August 8, 2013, software repositories were made publicly available making possible the usage of the Windows Silverlight plugin in Linux-native web browsers using Wine. Previous Linux Netflix support required running the entire Firefox web browser through the Wine compatibility layer.

== See also ==
- Computer addiction
- Internet addiction disorder
- Social aspects of television
- Television addiction
