= Mantinc el català =

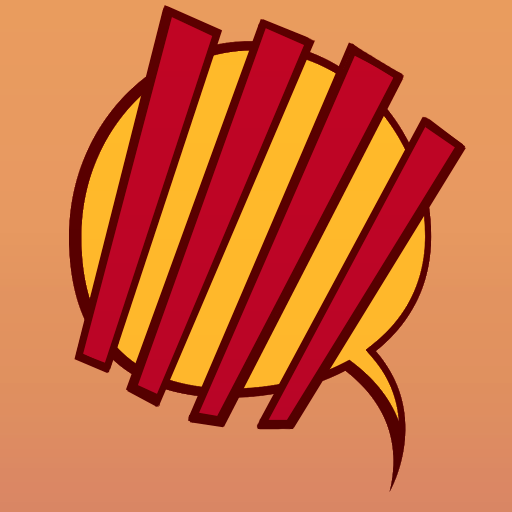
- Formation: 2021
- Purpose: To promote self-awareness and reversal of Catalan speakers in situations of diglossia, language shift or passive bilingualism
- Region served: Catalan Countries
- Official language: Catalan
- Website: mantincelcatala.cat

Mantinc el català (in English for 'I maintain Catalan') is a linguistic, non-profit citizen platform distributed in various parts of the Catalan Countries, where Catalan is an autochthonous language. Its volunteering aims to encourage the language revitalization in the public sphere by persuading, as many Catalan speakers as possible, to refrain from unconsciously shifting their language to (mostly) Spanish in routine situations such as in the street, commerce, public services or with the immigrants. Its organizational motto is Mantinc el català sempre, a tot arreu i amb tothom! ('I maintain Catalan always, everywhere and with everybody!').

The group was initially created on Facebook in 2021, shortly after some people showed common interest from a published interview with the Catalan sociolinguist Carme Junyent i Figueras. Expert in minoritized languages, Junyent i Figueras had released her book El futur del català depèn de tu ('The future of Catalan depends on you') few months earlier. The group's presence later extended to most of the rest of social media channels, particularly Twitter.

It primarily conducts self-awareness campaigns and digital dissemination to make linguistic loyalty into a standard pattern of behavior (without shame or doubtfulness) among Catalan speakers. Additionally, its members display billboards during sporting, cultural, and popular events, as well as in various types of social demonstrations.

== Rhetoric and public discourse ==
The public discursive philosophy of Mantinc el català lies in being able to transmit a proactive response and a respectful concern against the setback in the social use and increased minoritization that Catalan has endured in the past decades. It appeals to the linguistic justice to draw attention about the effects of diglossia and the most blatant instances of passive bilingualism, such as when a consolidated Catalan speaker switches to Spanish (or to French in North Catalonia, or to Italian in l'Alguer) only because of assuming that an immigrant or someone with foreign physical traits will not understand Catalan at first.

Its goal is to dismantle the language transfer towards Spanish, French and Italian as linguas francas by promoting a linguistic assertiveness of maintaining Catalan with everyone within that linguistic area (i.e., since the beginning of any oral or written conversation, thus reassuring real bilingualism). Mantinc el català argues that it is wholly unnecessary for their speakers to subordinate one to another by default because surveys across all the Catalan Countries show that between 60% of the population (in Northern Catalonia) and up to 90% or even 97% of the population (in l'Alguer, Andorra, Catalonia, La Franja, the Valencian Country, and the Balearic Islands) are capable enough to understand Catalan.

== Activities and campaigns ==
The most significant actions by Mantinc el català are digital campaigns and recurring videos with people from various social fields to encourage the population to follow their motto. During the 2022 celebration of the Diada de Sant Jordi, the platform launched a proposal for Catalan speakers to try to safeguard it as their initial, default language for a period of 21 days, both in the personal and professional environments. Their members wanted to spread the habit of speaking in Catalan at first, in order to overcome any uncertainty or fear of not being understood or encountering prejudice. The challenge was inspired by previous proposals from language communities like the Galician and the Basque ones, and received support from organizations such as Obra Cultural Balear.

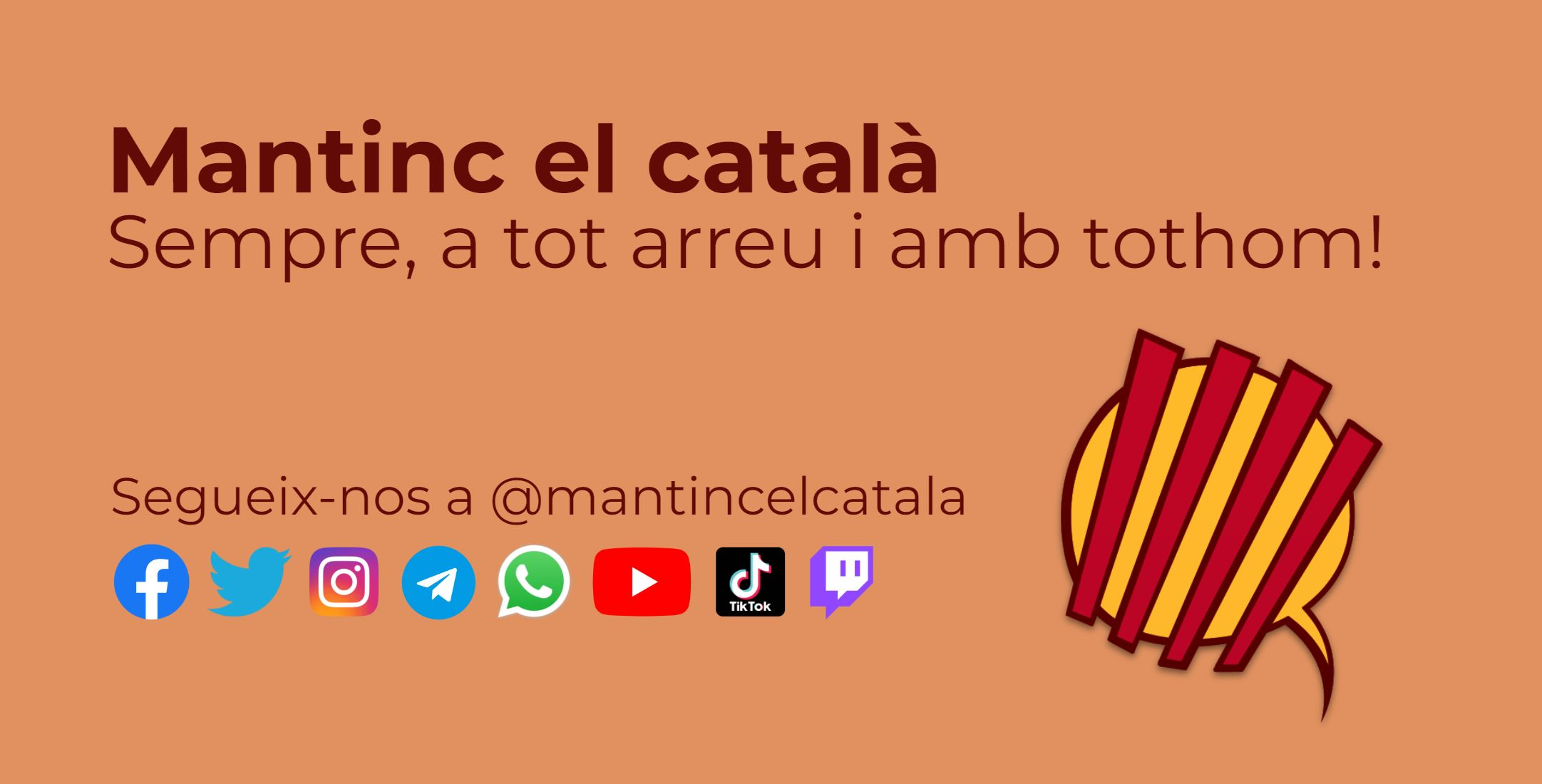
Slogan of Mantinc el català, with its common digital banner

On summer 2022, it took part in an informal Internet movement that called for the mass cancellation of Netflix subscriptions, then the most popular video streaming platform in the Catalan-speaking territory. They justified the action by citing the language discrimination polemics in the streaming company and the very low presence of Catalan in its catalog, which accounted for less than 0.5% of the thousands of titles available, as well as a lack of user the interface in this language. Five days after the action, that took place on June 23, Netflix updated up to 12 titles in Catalan made available to 190 countries. It became one of the most significant dumps of titles in Catalan from the company until the date, which matched its recent agreement with the Government of Catalonia to offer more content in that language.

Mantinc el català has carried banners in demonstrations about the protection of the language immersion school teaching system in Catalonia, as well as in other cultural, sports, and language events or workshops. It was also present at CreaFest 2022, an event in that language for content creators and influencers. It launched a crowdfunding in the 2022-2023 football season to display a giant banner with the platform's motto in El Clàssic at Camp Nou.

A few conservative Spanish media have criticized this group's activities and claims. When Mantinc el català promoted in 2023 a petition for parents of Catalan-speaking children to formally ask schools and daycare centers what their children's linguistic habits were in different environments (playground, lunchtime or group tasks), the newspaper Crónica Global described the group as "radicals of monolingualism" and "moving their witch-hunting to schools". La Razón accused the platform of "harassing the Spanish language" and described them as "a separatist organization, in line with similar ones and subsidized by the Catalan Government". Another controversy arose when the group advocated on Twitter that the Hospital de Sant Joan de Déu de Barcelona should emphasize in the use of Catalan as a core language in their social handles, despite the fact that they were already aware that the hospital had two user profiles, one for each language. Crónica Global published another report on the case that included the expression "fanatics of Catalan" in the headline.
