= Richard Rodriguez (disambiguation) =

Richard Rodriguez (born 1944) is an American writer.

Richard Rodriguez or Richard Rodríguez may also refer to:

- Ricky Rodriguez (1975–2005), ex-member of the Children of God religious movement
- Rich Rodriguez (born 1963), college football coach
- Rich Rodriguez (baseball) (born 1963), American baseball player
- Richard Rodriguez, Baruch College student leader and disciple of Andrew Salter
- Richard Rodríguez (cyclist) (born 1978), Chilean cyclist
- Richard Rodriguez (athlete) (born 1969), Aruban athlete
- Richard Rodríguez (baseball) (born 1990), Dominican baseball player
- Richard Rodríguez (footballer) (born 1992), Uruguay-born Nicaraguan footballer
