= Andrew Salter =

Andrew Salter may refer to:

- Andrew Salter (psychologist) (1914–1996), American psychotherapist
- Andrew Salter (cricketer) (born 1993), Welsh cricketer
