= Passive speaker =

Passive speaker(s) can refer to:

- A loudspeaker that lacks an integrated amplifier
- Passive speaker (language), a person who can understand but not speak a language
