= Saint George's Day in Catalonia =

Annual festival in Catalonia

Saint George's Day Diada de Sant Jordi (Catalan)
- Official name: Diada de Sant Jordi
- Also called: Dia del Llibre i de la Rosa
- Observed by: Catalonia
- Significance: Feast day of Saint George as patron saint of Catalonia
- Celebrations: Exchange of books and roses between loved ones, celebration of Catalan culture and literature, celebration of love and affection
- Begins: 15th c. (roses); October 7, 1926 (books); April 23, 1931 (current)
- Date: 23 April
- Next time: 23 April 2027
- Frequency: Annual
- Related to: St George's Day in other countries, World Book Day, Valentine's Day

Saint George's Day (Catalan: Diada de Sant Jordi), also known as the Day of Books and Roses (Dia del Llibre i de la Rosa), is celebrated annually in Catalonia (Spain) on 23 April. Saint George (Catalan: Sant Jordi) is the patron saint of Catalonia in a tradition established in the Middle Ages. Despite being a working day, it is one of Catalonia’s national holidays due to its overwhelming popularity and cultural significance. It is also celebrated, to a lesser extent, in Northern Catalonia (France), in Andorra, and in some other areas of Spain.

On this day, love and literature are widely celebrated throughout Catalonia. Books and roses are exchanged, whether between sweethearts, family and loved ones, or among friends. Traditionally, men gave women a red rose (often combined with an ear of wheat), and women gave men a book, however, in modern times the mutual exchange of books and roses regardless of gender is also customary. Therefore, the festival roughly serves to the similar romantic purpose of Valentine's Day in Anglophone countries.

== History ==
=== Sant Jordi's legend and the Rose Fair ===
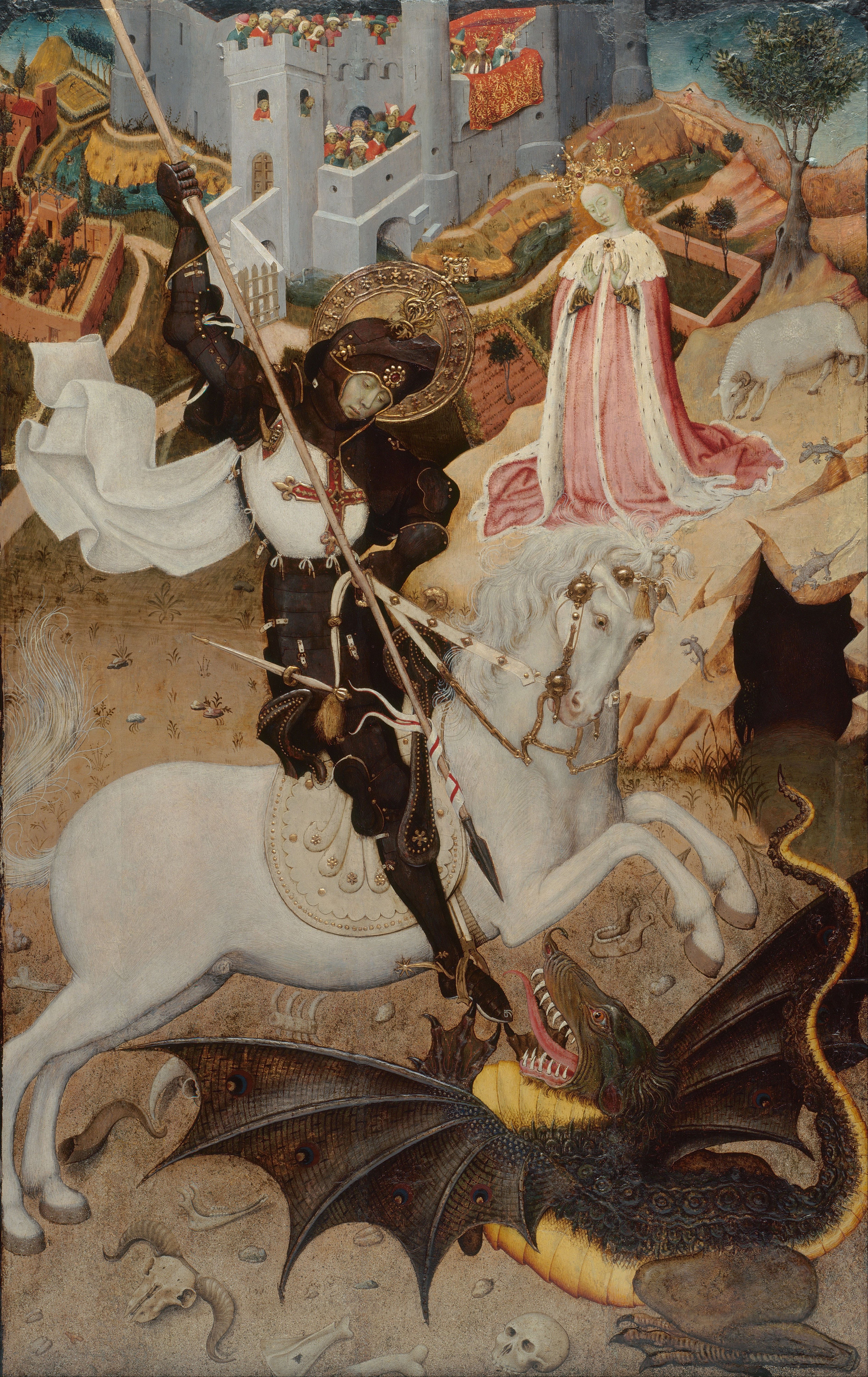
Saint George and the Dragon, Bernat Martorell painting of Sant Jordi, the dragon, and the princess. Commissioned by the Catalan government c. 1434

Before 1931, April 23 was simply known as the Day of the Rose or Sant Jordi's Day in Catalonia.

The story is based on real events from April 23, 303 AD, when Romans beheaded a Christian soldier named George, probably in Greece. The story of this knight then developed into a legend over hundreds of years. In Catalonia the legend involved Sant Jordi killing a dragon and saving a princess. When Jordi slew the dragon, a rose bush grew from the blood of the dragon, and the knight picked the most beautiful red rose and offered it to the princess. According to legend, a rose bush grows there every April. A Catalan variation to the traditional legend places the events of Jordi’s story in the town of Montblanc, in the region of Tarragona.

This legend emerged in the 11th century and spread throughout the Principality of Catalonia in the 13th century. In 1201, king Peter II founded the Order of Sant Jordi d'Alfama, with its headquarters in Catalonia's south. The celebrations associated with Sant Jordi began around 1427, with the Palau de la Generalitat in Barcelona hosting a Rose Fair. In 1456 the General Court of Catalonia (the parliament) named Sant Jordi as the patron saint of Catalonia, and the annual commemoration with roses was institutionalized.

In the early 1700s, with the fall of the city of Barcelona and the ascension of the Bourbons to the Spanish throne, Sant Jordi's Day began to fall out of favor. It was not until the end of the 1800s, with the Renaixença, that Sant Jordi's day regained its previous popularity within Catalonia. From 1914 to 1923, the Commonwealth of Catalonia (the first recognized administration for the entirely of Catalonia since 1833) actively supported the revival of the celebration.

=== Day of the Book ===
The first Catalan printed book was published in 1474, not long after Gutenberg's invention of the printing press.

In 1923, Vicente Clavel, a Valencian writer, editor, and the director of the Cervantes publishing house in Barcelona, first proposed Book Day. A decision was not made and the proposal languished; however, in 1925, he raised the idea with the Catalan Chamber of Books, of which he was vice president, and finally in February 1926 a decision was made to create and promote a day dedicated to books on October 7. October 7 is believed by some people to be the birth date of the writer Miguel de Cervantes.

Clavel and the Chamber of Books also lobbied for Day of the Book at a national level; as a result, that same year, King Alfonso XIII of Spain signed a decree designating October 7 as Book Day. The day after the second annual Book Day, on October 8, 1927, the Barcelona newspaper, La Vanguardia published, "Barcelona celebrated Book Day with real fervor yesterday. A festival of civility and intelligence, it has quickly taken root in the soul of the city. From last year—when it was held for the first time—to this year, the progress is extraordinary".

=== Merging ===
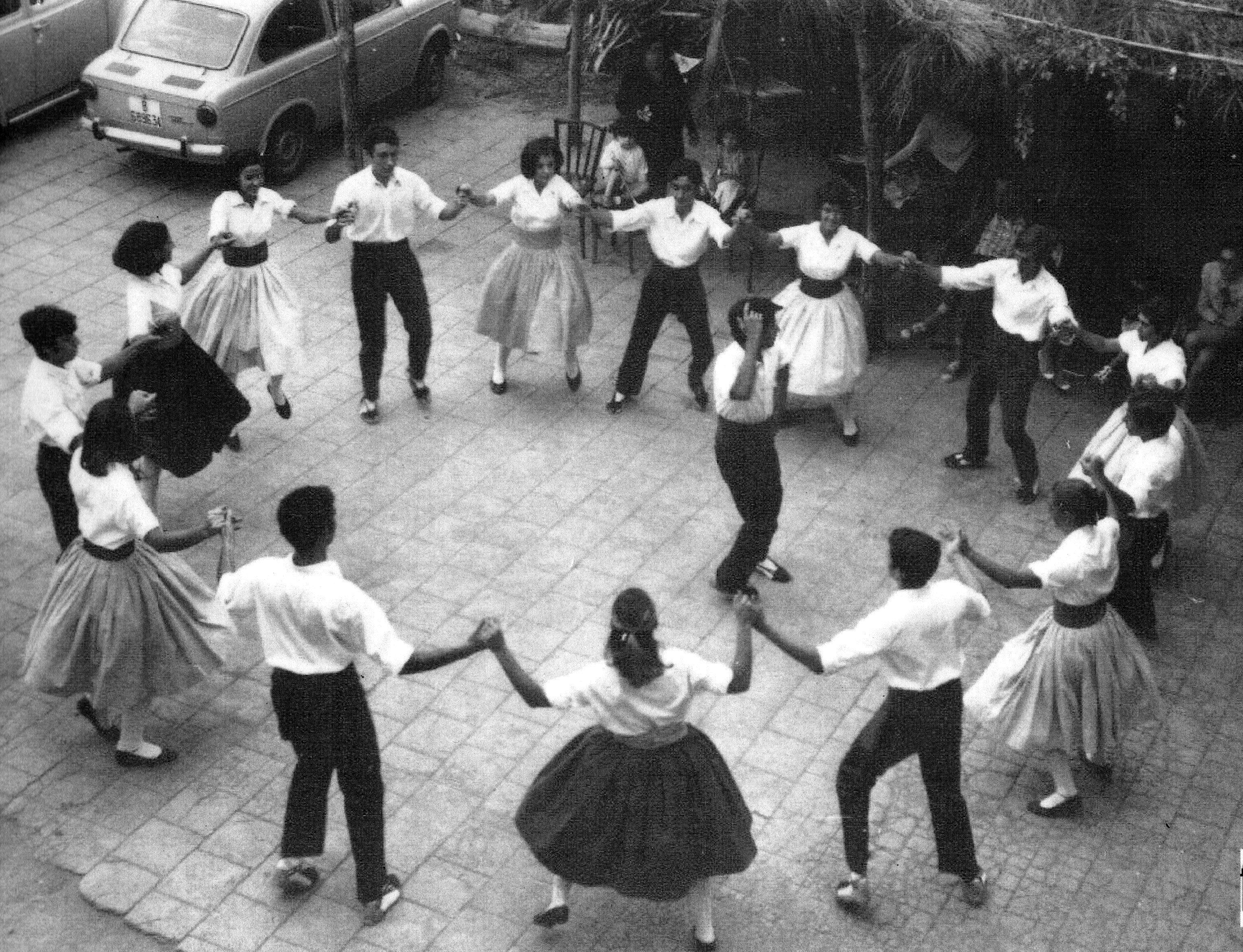
Sardana on April 23, 1970, in Barcelona

In 1931, five years after the establishment of the Day of the Book, the event was moved from October 7 to April 23 at the request of booksellers to coincide with the anniversaries of the deaths of Cervantes and Shakespeare. The day quickly grew in popularity during the autonomous Catalonia within the Second Spanish Republic because it also coincided with the aforementioned Rose Fair of St. Jordi's Day, which had been celebrated for hundreds of years, and the two festivals merged spontaneously. Throughout the Republican era (1931-1936), the celebration helped to give a significant boost to Catalan literature and to the process of cultural and institutional renormalization of the Catalan language, which regained official status in 1932.

Although the Day of Books and Roses quickly became a consolidated festival, under the Spanish dictatorship of Francisco Franco, from 1936 to 1975, anti-Catalan policies were enacted, Catalan language and culture was repressed, and Sant Jordi celebrations were heavily censored. During the first years of Francoism, the Day was renamed Fiesta de las Letras (Spanish for "Letter's Feastivity"), fascistic literature was promoted, Catalan reivinidicative elements were prohibited and, until the late 1940s, books in Catalan language were banned and virtually disappeared. Over time, during the 1950s and 1960s, several of these prohibitions relaxed and Catalan literature slowly re-emerged. Following the death of the dictator (1975), Saint George's Day regained its characteristic festive brilliance.

In 1995, UNESCO adopted April 23 as World Book Day and decreed the book as the most important instrument in the dissemination of knowledge. In 2015 Barcelona was named as a UNESCO City of Literature; central to the candidacy was the unique celebration of books and roses. In 2017, a group of Catalan publishers, booksellers, florists, and other professionals presented an application to UNESCO to have the Day of Books and Roses recognized as Intangible Heritage.

== Contemporary celebration ==
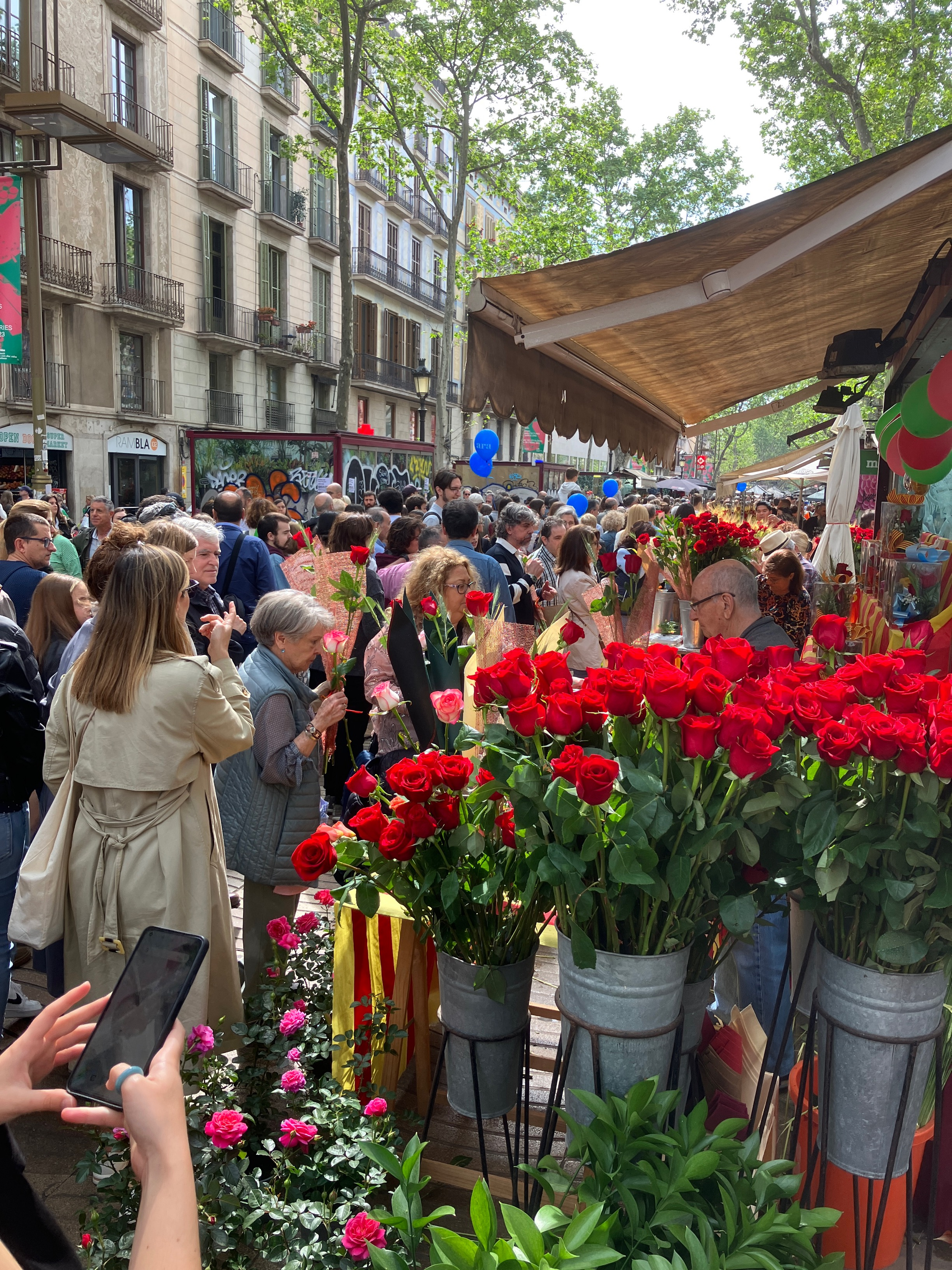
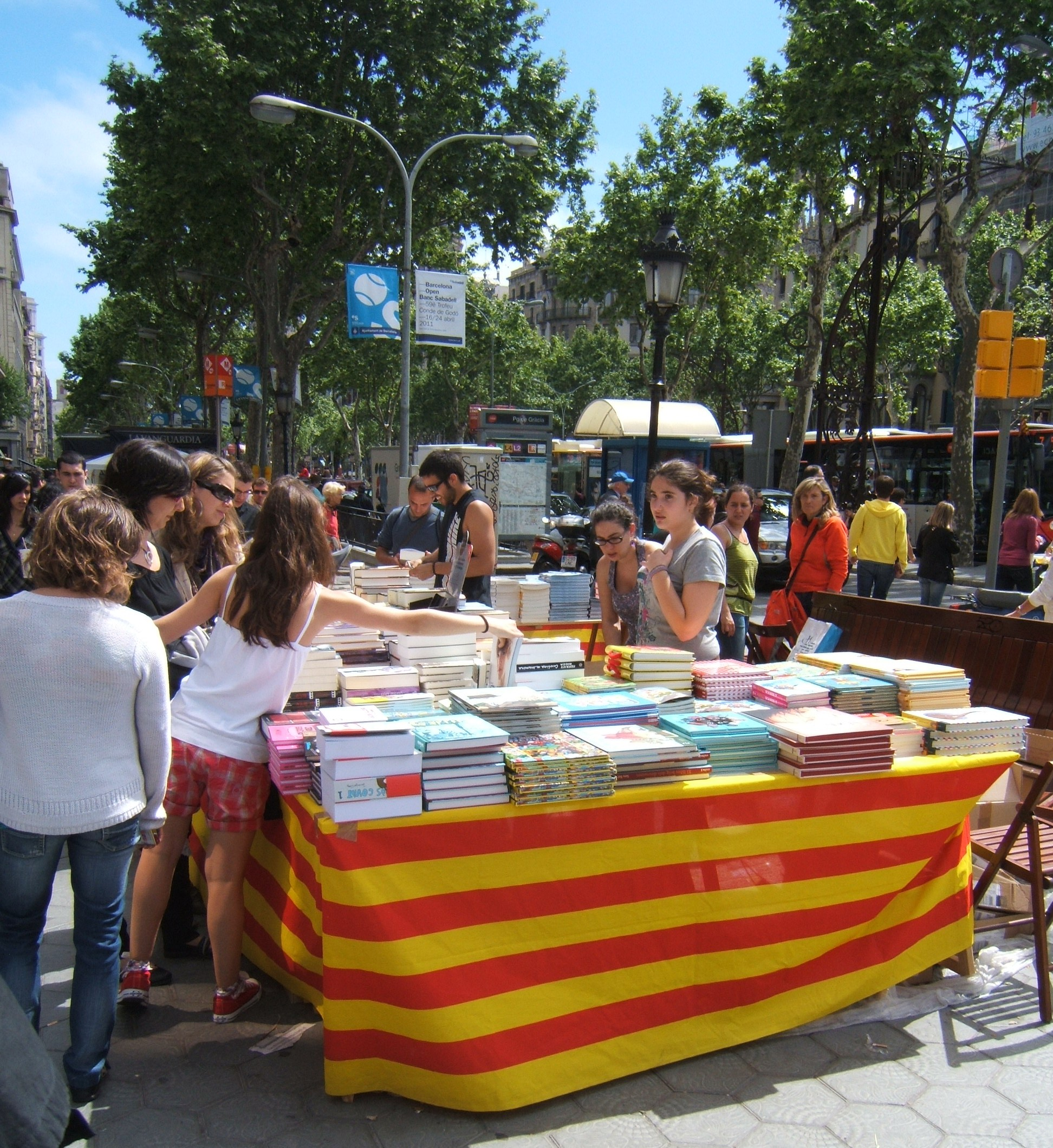
Left: Selling roses on April 23, 2023, Barcelona. Right: Book selling in Passeig de Gràcia, Barcelona, 2011

Since 1997 the official slogan of the day has been "A rose for a love, and a book forever".

April 23 is one of the most important days in Catalan culture when people exchange books and roses. Preparations for the Day of Books and Roses begins well before April 23. In Barcelona, the city is papered with posters in all neighborhoods, and the central activity is in La Rambla, the Passeig de Gràcia, and Rambla de Catalunya. On the sidewalks tents are set up from which books and red roses are sold. Bookstores bring their materials outside, and various associations, unions, and schools line the streets at tables. Also, there are small tables of illustrators and authors selling and signing their books. Even though there is considerable activity in the streets, bookstores are also crowded on this day with lines extending outside. While Barcelona is clearly the epicenter of the day, virtually the entirely of the municipalities of Catalonia carry on the same kind of celebrations, with similar intensity.

Schools in Catalonia prepare for the day with numerous activities related to books and literature. This includes the celebration of Floral Games of literature and poetry The sardana, the national dance of Catalonia, is performed throughout the day in the Plaça Sant Jaume in Barcelona. 23 April is also one of only three days a year when the Palau de la Generalitat, Catalonia's principal government building, is open to the public. The interior is decorated with roses to honour Saint George, often, the roses are blessed by the archbishop of Barcelona. The roses exchanged between couples are traditionally red, generally accompanied by an ear of wheat, and the two elements are joined with a ribbon with the colors of the Catalan flag. Until the end of the 20th century, roses were a gift from men to women, in recent times the gender of the person receiving the gift, both the book and the rose is becoming increasingly irrelevant.

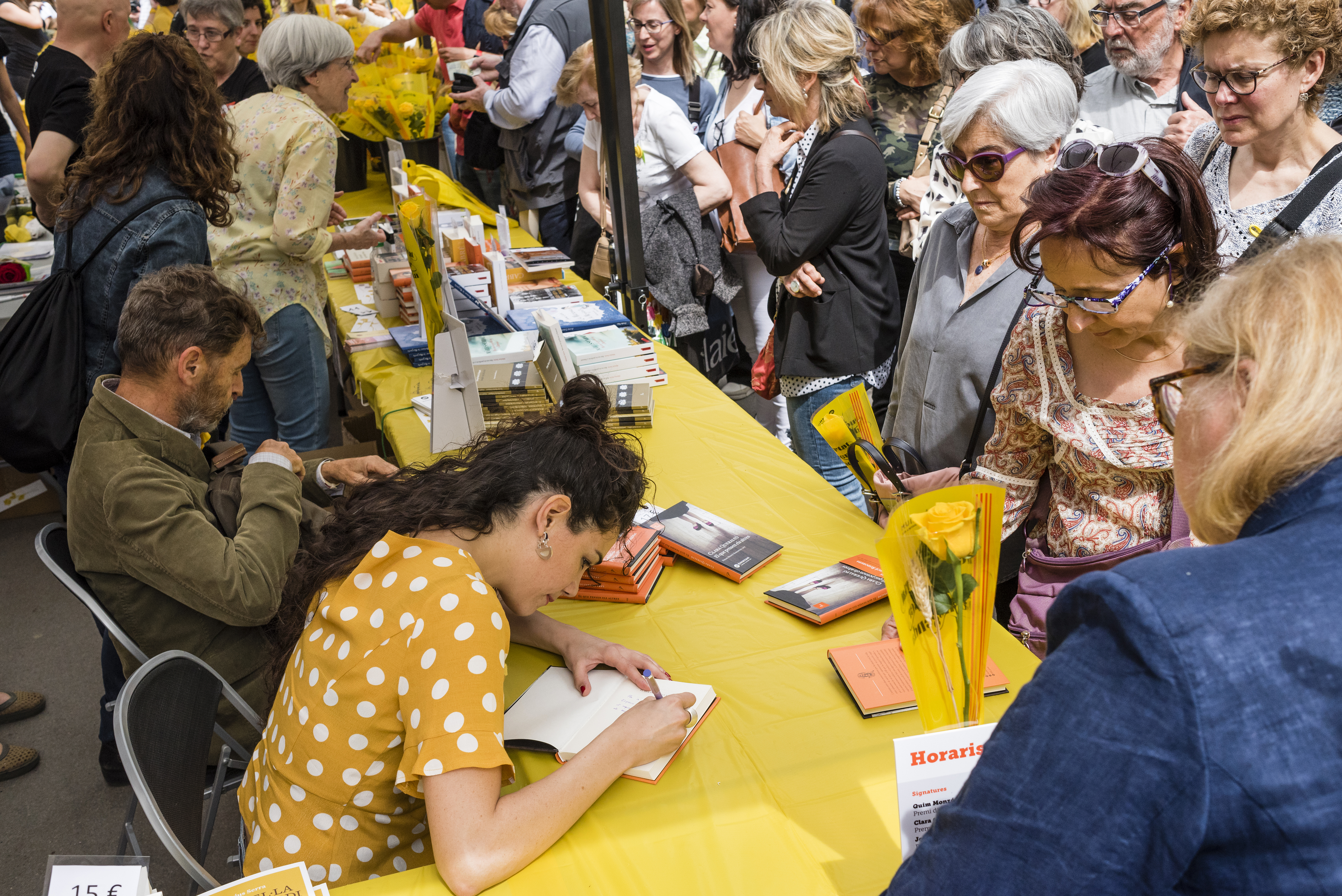
Author Clara Queraltó signing a book on April 23, 2018

The day generates considerable economic activity for authors, publishers, and booksellers. For example, in Catalonia on April 23, 2016, more than 1,580,000 copies of 45,267 book titles were sold, and 54 percent of these were in the Catalan language. Annually, approximately 8 percent of books sold in Catalonia—1.5 million—are sold on this day, as are a third of all roses.

Outside of Catalonia, Catalan houses, associations, and the delegations of the Generalitat promote the festivity not only among Catalans abroad, but also open to anyone, often with roses and books stalls like those in Catalonia. In 2015, the Barcelona-based Diplocat Consortium (Catalan government) launched an effort to internationalize the Day of Books and Roses. The campaign uses the hashtag #BooksAndRoses to bring attention to events, activities, and celebrations outside of Catalonia.

=== Issues ===
In 2021, at the initiative of the United Nations, the Spanish government declared April 23 as Spanish Language Day, in order to promote this language in a special way. Various activists and media argue that the chosen date was done in order to diminish the specifically Catalan character of the Diada de Sant Jordi due to the protagonism that enjoys Catalan language, literature and culture throughout the festivity.

With the aim of increasing awareness about the decline of Catalan as a language of social use, During the Diada de Sant Jordi of 2022, the plattform Mantinc el català (English: 'I maintain Catalan') launched a proposal for Catalan speakers to try to safeguard it as their initial, default language for a period of 21 days.

== See also ==
- National Day of Catalonia (September 11)
- National symbols of Catalonia
- Traditions of Catalonia
- Creu de Sant Jordi
