= La Beguda Alta =

Coordinates: 41.499°N 1.838°E

La Beguda Alta is a village integrated in the municipality of Masquefa in the comarca of the Anoia in Catalonia. It is on the road between Masquefa and Martorell, and is served by a station on the FGC railway line R6 between Barcelona and Igualada. Its population as of 2005 was 171.
