= Saint George's Day (Spain) =

Annual celebration, April 23

Diada de Sant Jordi
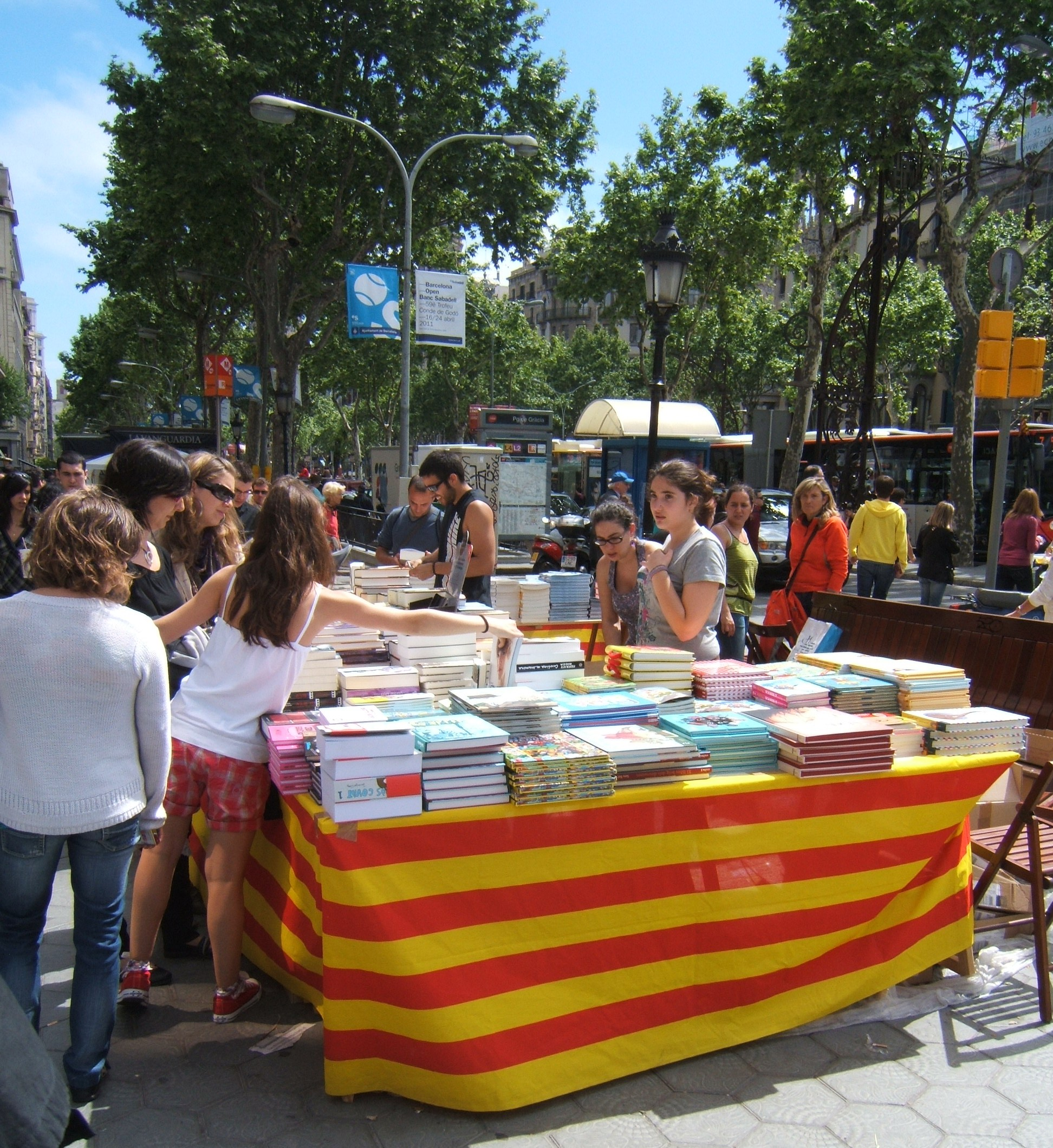
- Observed by: Former Crown of Aragon territories.
- Type: Secular, cultural
- Celebrations: books and roses as gift-giving
- Date: 23 April
- Frequency: Annual

Saint George's Day (Spanish: San Jorge; Catalan: Sant Jordi) is celebrated annually on April 23. It is a significant day in several parts of Spain. The same date is also World Book Day, which was originally a Spain-only celebration (Día del libro).

== Aragon ==
In 1978 Aragon officially declared April 23 as a celebration for San Jorge (Aragonese: Sant Chorche), the patron of Aragon, and titled it "Dia de Aragón". Day of Aragon commemorates the Battle of Alcoraz, when Huesca was conquered by the Aragonese army and where San Jorge allegedly appeared to the Christian forces at a critical moment in the battle.

== Cantabria ==
The town Viérnoles in Cantabria celebrates several days of "Las Fiestas de San Jorge" at the end of April and or beginning of May.

== Catalonia ==
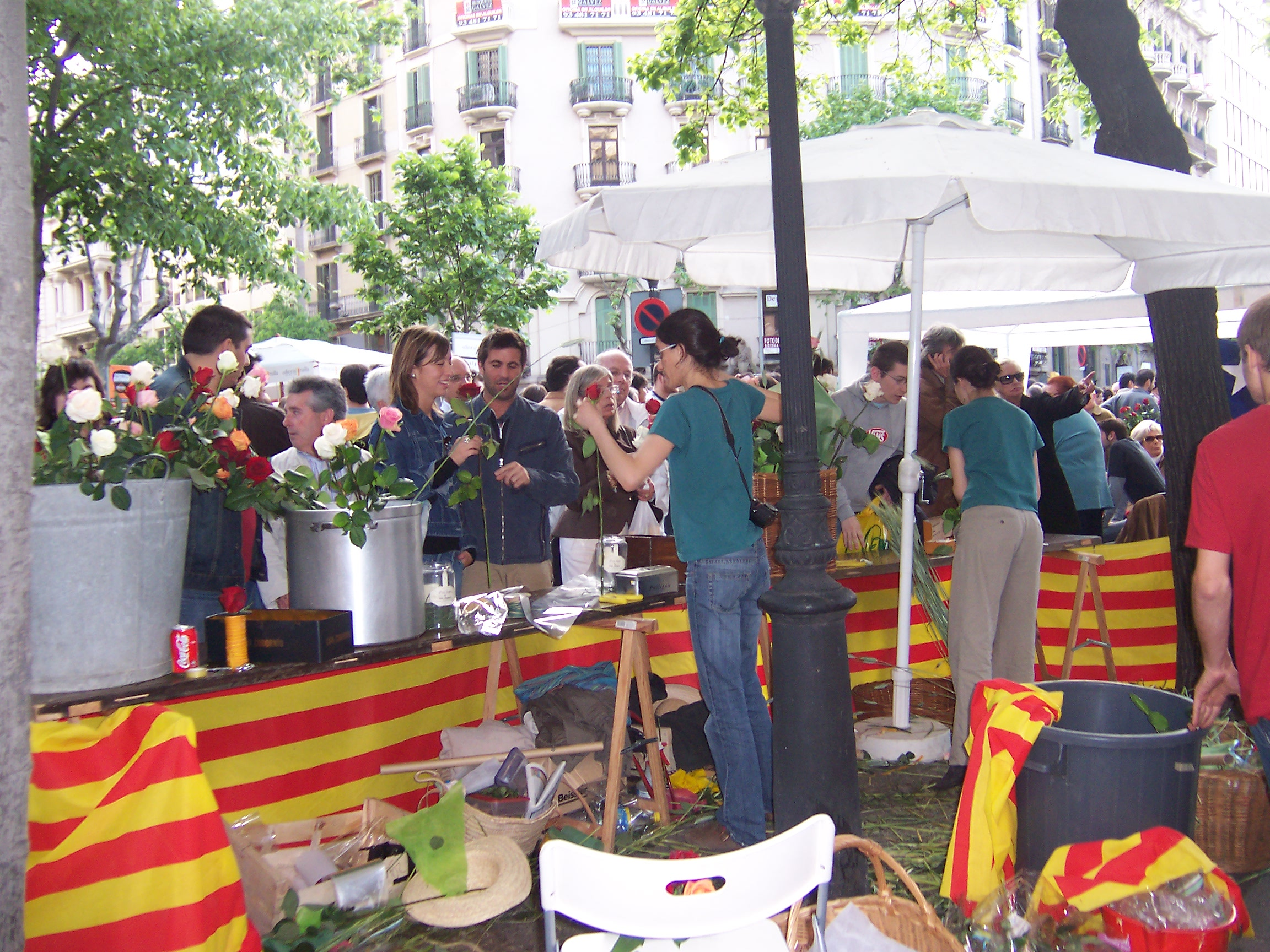
A rose stall in Barcelona, St. George's Day, 2006

Saint George (Catalan: Sant Jordi) is the patron saint of Catalonia. The Diada de Sant Jordi (Catalan pronunciation: [diˈaðə ðə ˈsaɲ ˈʒɔɾði], Saint George's Day), also known as El Dia de la Rosa (The Day of the Rose), or El Dia del Llibre (The Day of the Book), or the Day of Books and Roses. In Catalonia the main activity is the exchange of roses and books between sweethearts, loved ones and colleagues. From the 1920's, men gave women roses, and women gave men a book to celebrate the occasion – "a rose for love and a book forever." The fair of roses was called the lovers' fair because it was attended by engaged and recently married couples. In modern times, the mutual exchange of books is also customary.

Roses have been associated with this day since medieval times, but the giving of books is a more recent Catalan tradition originating in 1923, when a writer and publisher, Vicente Cavel, started to promote the holiday as a way to commemorate the nearly simultaneous deaths of Miguel de Cervantes and William Shakespeare on 23 April 1616. Barcelona is the publishing capital of both Catalan and Spanish languages, and the combination of love and literacy was quickly adopted.

The sardana, the national dance of Catalonia, is performed throughout the day in the Plaça Sant Jaume in Barcelona. Many book stores and cafes host readings by authors (including 24-hour marathon readings of different classics of Catalan literature or Spanish literature). Street performers and musicians in public squares add to the day's atmosphere.

23 April is also one of only three days a year when the Palau de la Generalitat, Barcelona's principal government building, is open to the public. The interior is decorated with roses to honour Saint George.

Catalonia exported its tradition of the book and the rose to the rest of the world. In 1995, UNESCO adopted 23 April as World Book Day.

== Extremadura ==
Each year Extremadura celebrations focus on the Christian reconquest of the city of Cáceres. Festivities include the "burning of the dragon" and dramatizes re-enactments of the battles between Christians and Muslims. In addition, there is a procession to the shrine of the Virgin of La Montaña, a bonfire competition, and a search for two golden eggs hidden in Cáceres.

== Valencia ==
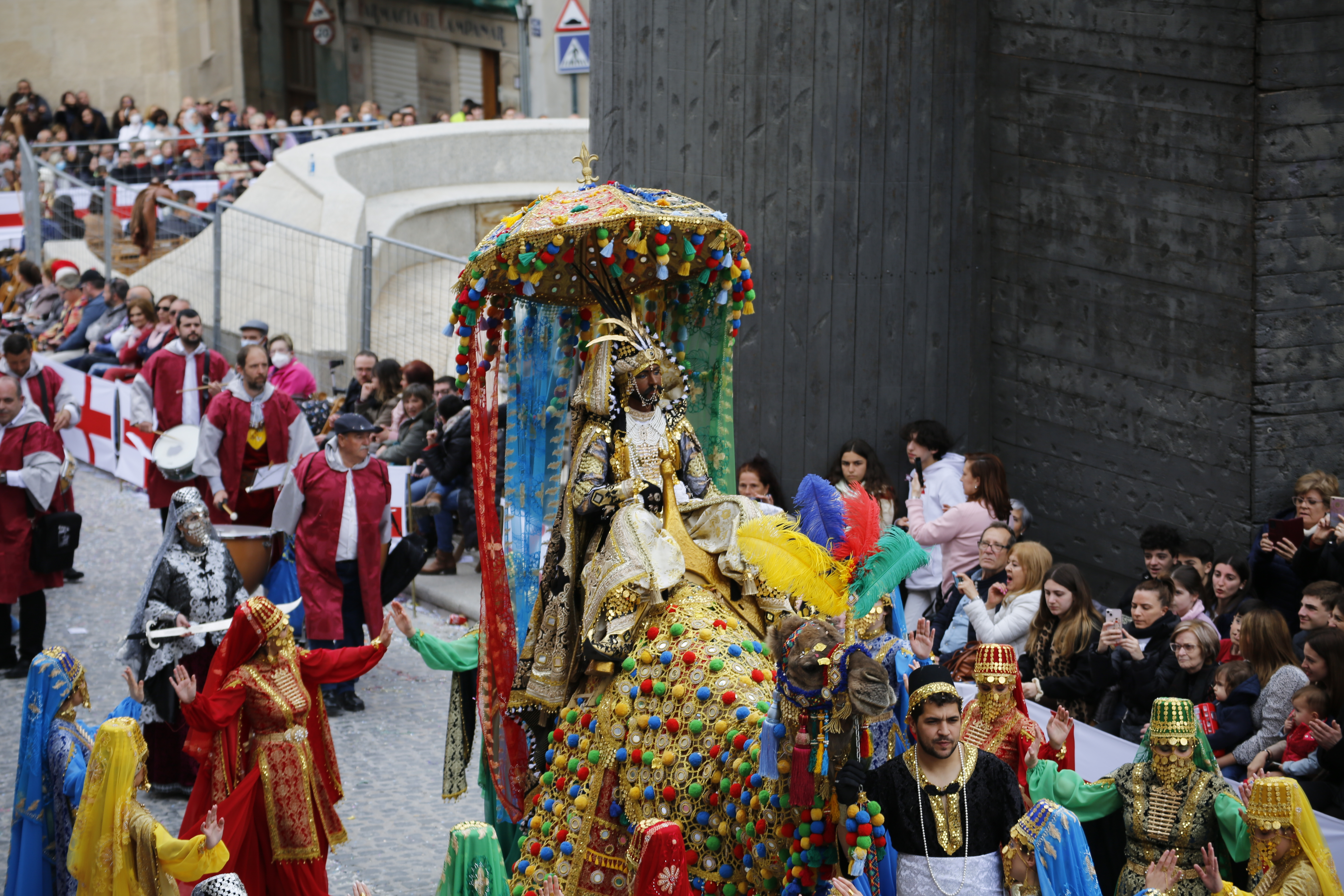
Moors and Christians of Alcoi, 2022.

The Community of Valencia celebrates St George's Day with a different intensity, though in several zones it has similarities to Valentine's Day, like in Catalonia.

One notable celebration is in the Valencian city of Alcoi. There, Saint George's Day is commemorated as a thanksgiving celebration for the proclaimed aid the Saint provided to the Christian troops fighting the Muslims in the siege of the city. Its citizens commemorate the day with a festivity in which thousands of people parade in medieval costumes, forming two "armies" of Moors and Christians and re-enacting the siege that gave the city to the Christians.
