= Carme Junyent =

Catalan linguist (1955–2023)

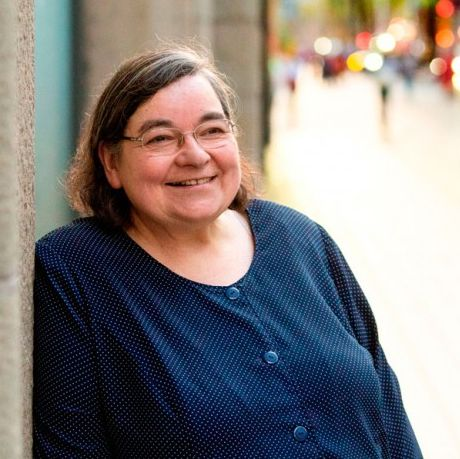
- Junyent in the Basque Country, 2020
- Born: Maria Carme Junyent i Figueras; 4 February 1955; Masquefa, Catalonia, Spain
- Died: 3 September 2023 (aged 68)
- Occupations: Linguist; language activist; university professor
- Children: 2
- Honours: Creu de Sant Jordi (2019)

Academic background
- Education: University of Barcelona; University of Marburg; University of Cologne; University of California
- Thesis: La classificació de les llengües d'Àfrica: el bantu i una hipòtesi (més) sobre la seva expansió (1991)

Maria Carme Junyent i Figueras (4 February 1955 – 3 September 2023), commonly known as Carme Junyent, was a Catalan linguist. Renowned in her work field, in particular for her defense of the Catalan language and studies on endangered languages, she was a professor of linguistics at the University of Barcelona. She specialized in African languages and sociolinguistics.

== Early life and education ==
Maria Carme Junyent i Figueras was born on 4 February 1955, in Masquefa, a small village in the province of Barcelona, Spain. She studied philology at the University of Barcelona, and completed her education at the University of Marburg, the University of Cologne, and the University of California. In 1991, she obtained her doctorate at the University of Barcelona with a thesis entitled La classificació de les llengües d'Àfrica: el bantu i una hipòtesi (més) sobre la seva expansió (lit. 'The classification of African languages: Bantu and a (further) hypothesis about its expansion') under the direction of linguist Jesús Tuson Valls.

== Career ==
In 1992, Junyent created the University of Barcelona–based Endangered Languages Study Group, which she directed until her death in 2023. In 1996, she contributed to the Universal Declaration of Linguistic Rights as a consultant.

The defense of Catalan was Junyent's main commitment as a linguist and she believed that the gradual loss of the social use of the language had succeeded in making it an endangered language. In 1999, Junyent published the article "El català, una llengua en perill d'extinció?" (lit. '"Catalan, a language in danger of extinction?'), in which she analyzed the risk of Catalan ending up as a substituted language from the point of view of linguistic anthropology. Junyent appealed to individual responsibility to save Catalan, that Catalan speakers should never stop speaking it and transmitting it even when they are spoken to in Spanish and that young people and teachers should be more conscious of using it and its normalization on the Internet. She also considered that an eventual Catalan republic would not have to have an official language, since this was not a guarantor of the Catalan language but exclusively its use and transmission.

Junyent also repeatedly expressed her rejection of inclusive language. In 2010, she organized the conference "Visibilitzar o marcar. Repensar el gènere en la llengua catalana" (lit. '"To make visible or to mark. Rethinking gender in the Catalan language"'), whose analysis and interventions were collected in a book published in 2013 with the same name. This book is based on the use of the generic masculine as inclusive of the masculine and feminine genders, making the use of the split gender forms unnecessary, affirming that it is impossible for society to change by changing its language, as language is the reflection of a society and not the other way around. In 2022, she published the book Som dones, som lingüistes, som moltes i diem prou (lit. '"We are women, we are linguists, we are many and we say enough"'), which she published together with 70 women linguists, in which she expressed her criticism of inclusive language and the need to put an end to what she called an "imposition".

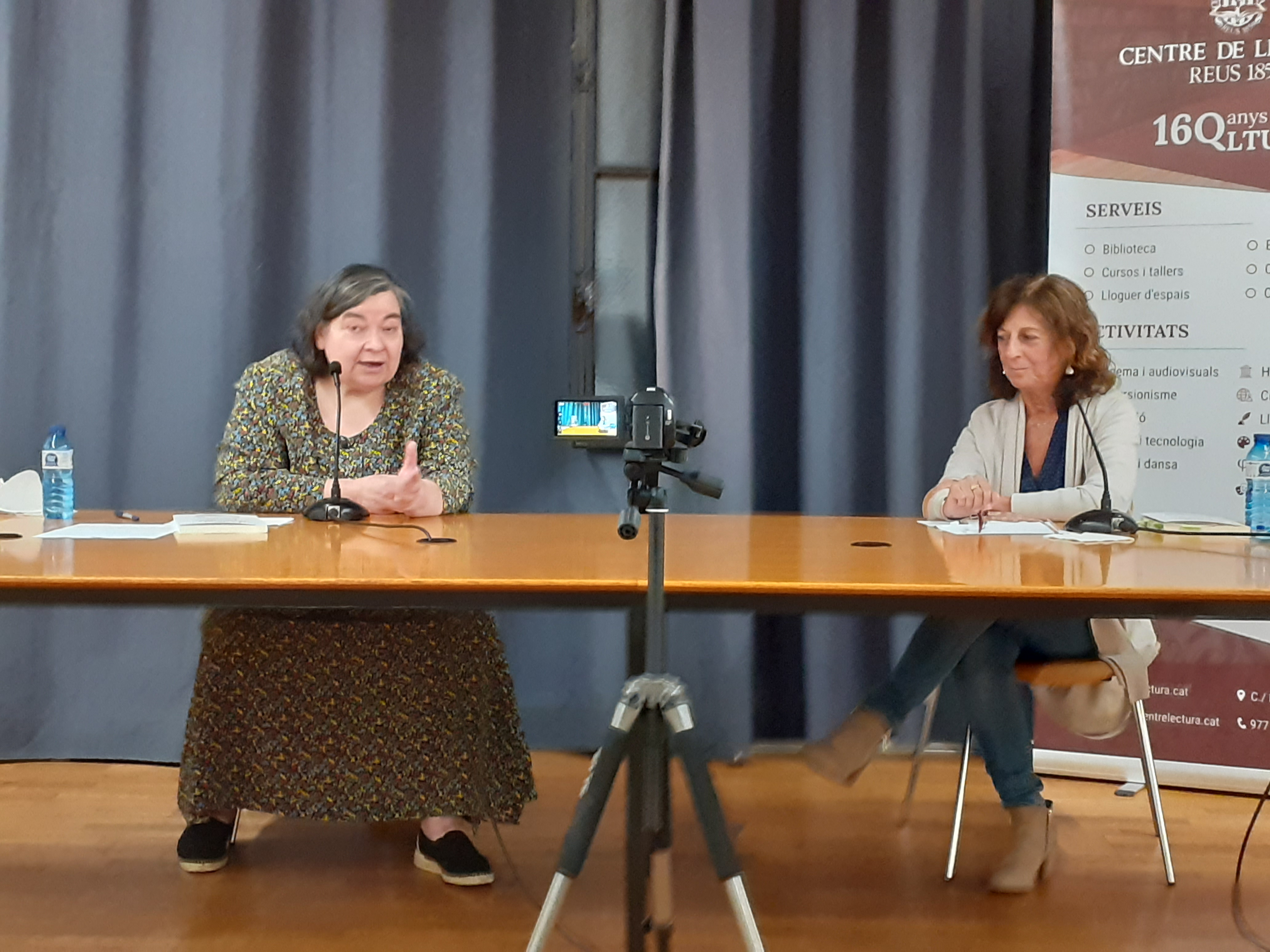
Junyent in Reus in 2020

Junyent also penned notable works about languages, such as El futur del català depèn de tu (lit. 'The future of Catalan depends on you'), Les llengües del món (lit. 'Languages of the world'), Didàctica i recorregut de les llengües del món (lit. 'Didactics and tour of the world's languages'), Les llengües d’Àfrica (lit. 'The languages of Africa'), Vida i mort de les llengües (lit. 'Life and death of languages'), Les llengües a Catalunya (lit. 'Languages in Catalonia'), Trans-ferències. La manifestació dels processos extralingüístics en les llengües del món (lit. 'Transfers. The manifestation of extralinguistic processes in the languages of the world'), and Diversitat lingüística a l’aula. Construir centres educatius plurilingües (lit. 'Linguistic diversity in the classroom. Building multilingual educational centers')

In 2019, Junyent was awarded the Catalan Creu de Sant Jordi honour "for her long career in the study and defence of linguistic diversity in Catalonia and around the world".

On 1 March 2022, the Government of Catalonia appointed Junyent as president of its newly created Linguistic Advisory Council. As president of this Advisory Council, Junyent also promoted measures to improve the situation of the Aranese dialect in the Val d'Aran, especially in schools.

In May 2022, after the ruling of the High Court of Justice of Catalonia ordering that at least 25% of subjects in Catalan schools be taught in Spanish, Junyent stated that it was the consequence of the Catalan Ministry of Education's years of silence in the face of complaints from professionals, but that, even so, it would have to be fulfilled with the condition of the vernacular use of Catalan in school as a way of "defending ourselves" against a Spain that "goes against Catalonia".

Junyent was a regular contributor to Catalunya Radio and VilaWeb.

In her last article, titled "Morir-se en català" (lit. 'Dying in Catalan') and published just after her death at her request on VilaWeb, Junyent talks about the right to die in Catalan and the importance of being able to express oneself in one's own language at the end of one's life.

== Personal life and death ==
A single mother by choice, she had two children. She suffered from prosopagnosia.

Junyent died from pancreatic cancer on 3 September 2023 at age 68.
