= Passive speaker (language) =

Someone who can fully understand a language but not productively speak it

A passive speaker (also referred to as a receptive bilingual or passive bilingual) is a category of speaker who has had enough exposure to a language in childhood to have a native-like comprehension of it but has little or no active command of it. Passive fluency is often brought about by being raised in one language (which becomes the person's passive language) and being schooled in another language (which becomes the person's native language).

Such speakers are especially common in language shift communities where speakers of a declining language do not acquire active competence. For example, around 10% of the Ainu people who speak the language are considered passive speakers. Passive speakers are often targeted in language revival efforts to increase the number of speakers of a language quickly, as they are likely to gain active and near-native speaking skills more quickly than those with no knowledge of the language. They are also found in areas where people grow up hearing another language outside their family with no formal education.

== Language attitudes ==
A more common term for the phenomenon is 'passive bilingualism'. François Grosjean argues that there has been a monolingual bias regarding who is considered a 'bilingual' in which people who do not have equal competence in all their languages are judged as not speaking properly. 'Balanced bilinguals' are, in fact, very rare. One's fluency as a bilingual in a language is domain-specific: it depends on what each language is used for. That means that speakers may not admit to their fluency in their passive language although there are social (extralinguistic) factors that underlie their different competencies.

== See also ==
- Heritage speaker
- Home language
- School language
- Language acquisition
- Mantinc el català
- Multilingualism
- Mutual intelligibility
- Speech repetition
- Literary Arabic
