= Masquefa =

- Municipality
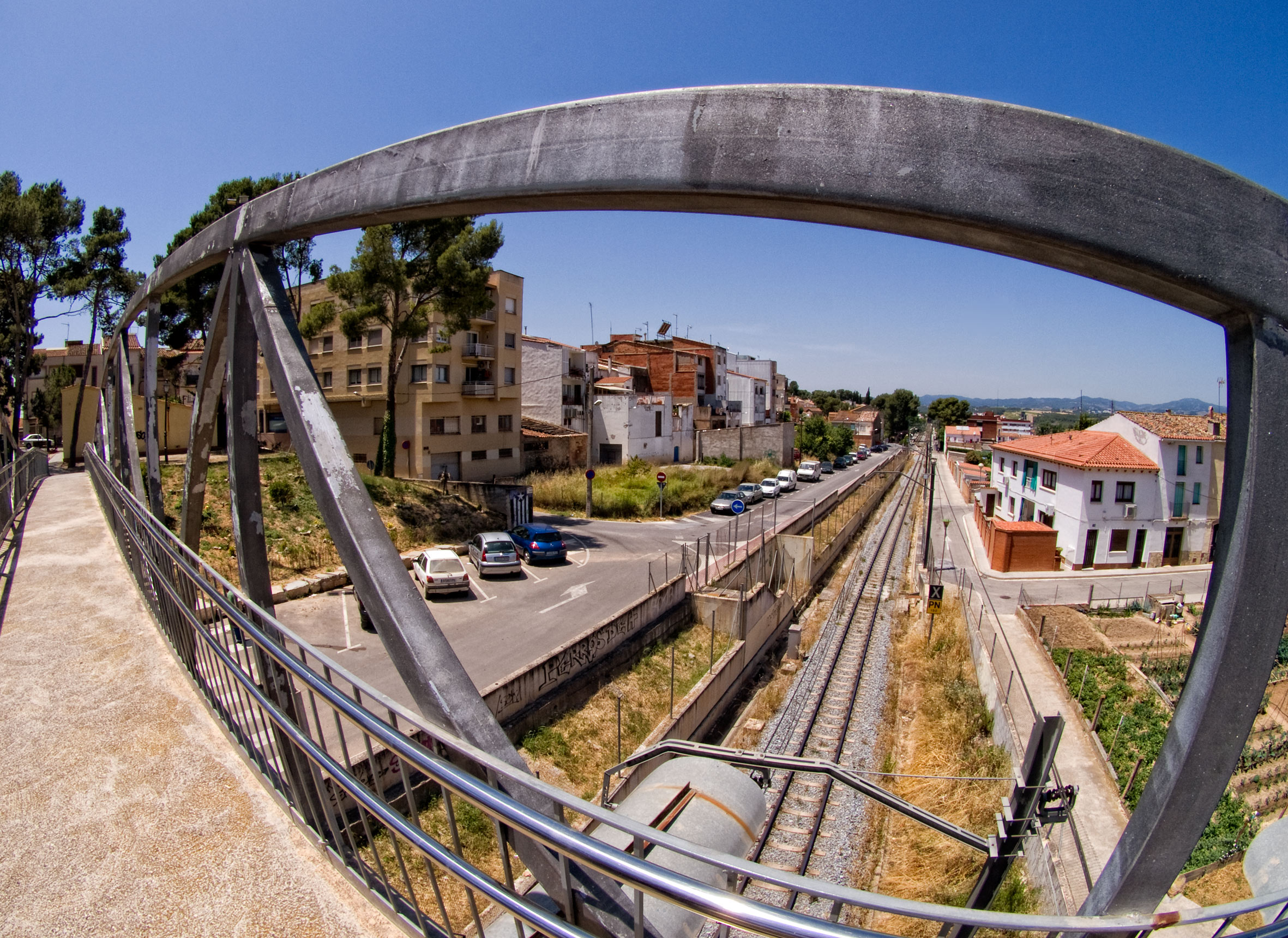

- Coat of arms

- Location in Catalonia Masquefa (Spain)
- Coordinates: 41°30′13″N 1°48′49″E
- Country: Spain
- Community: Catalonia
- Province: Barcelona
- Comarca: Anoia

Government
  - Mayor: Daniel Gutiérrez Espartero (PSC) (2025)

Area
  - Total: 17.1 km^{2} (6.6 sq mi)
- Elevation: 257 m (843 ft)

Population (2025-01-01)
  - Total: 10,120
  - Density: 592/km^{2} (1,530/sq mi)
- Demonym(s): Masquefí, masquefina
- Website: masquefa.cat

Masquefa (Catalan pronunciation: [məsˈkefə]) is a municipality in the comarca of the Anoia in Catalonia, Spain. It is situated on the edge of the Penedès Depression on the road between Piera and Martorell. It is served by a station on the FGC railway line R6 from Barcelona via Martorell to Igualada.

== Demography ==
1900	1930	1950	1970	1986	2007
959	1232	1160	1605	2483	7747

== Subdivisions ==
Five outlying villages are included within the municipality of Masquefa (populations as of 2005):

- La Beguda Alta (171), on the municipal boundary with Sant Esteve Sesrovires, with a railway station
- Can Parellada (1343), with a railway station
- Can Quiseró (197)
- Can Valls (99)
- El Maset (778)

== Transportation ==
Train line connecting Igualada with Barcelona has a stop for boarding on both ways of the line.
