= Andrew Salter (psychologist) =

American psychologist (1914–1996)

Andrew Salter (May 9, 1914 – October 7, 1996) was an American clinical psychologist who introduced behavior therapy, developed many of its conceptual foundations, and created numerous techniques still used today across its varied descendants, including cognitive behavioral therapy. His work in the early 1940s demystified hypnosis, interpreting it as a form of conditioning, now the widely accepted view. He was one of the founders of the Association for the Advancement of Behavioral Therapies, now the Association for Behavioral and Cognitive Therapies. He maintained an active clinical practice in Manhattan until shortly before his death. His key ideas are documented in his book, Conditioned Reflex Therapy, (hereafter CRT), originally published in 1949 and reprinted many times, with a new edition published by Watkins Press in 2019. All citations from CRT refer to this edition.

== Family life ==
Salter's parents were Russian Jews. His father, Morris, was a Social Democrat, sent into internal exile to the same penal village as Trotsky’s first wife, after which the family emigrated to the U.S. after the 1905 Revolution. In the U.S., Morris worked as a watchmaker in the factories of Waterbury, Connecticut, where Andrew was born on May 9, 1914. After his union organizing got Morris blacklisted, the family moved to the Bronx where Morris opened a small watch repair shop. Salter's mother, Fanny was a homemaker. Andrew had a brother who died before he was born and a younger sister, Bertha, who died in 2001.

In 1943, Salter married Rhoda Kazan, who had a B.A. from Queens College and an M.A. in sociology from the University of Minnesota. She managed the clinical practice, handled his finances, and was an essential contributor to his success. They had two sons: William, born in 1947, and Robert, born in 1952.

Salter lived in Manhattan for fifty years and very much enjoyed its museums, theaters, movies and music. He had many friends who were active in the arts, especially writers. On a deeper level, he believed it was an individual's responsibility to help others when possible, and so his colleagues—and even some of his professional antagonists—came to him when they or their family members needed help, because they appreciated his therapeutic insights and deep commitment to his work. As Gerald Davison wrote, "Those of us who knew Salter personally appreciated his sheer brilliance, his wit, his warmth, decency and consideration for others, his supportiveness, his keen intuitive grasp of human nature, his infectious zest for life, his love of art and literature, and his devotion to family and friends." (p. 32)

Salter always gave great credit to his wife, Rhoda, for her help, intelligence and insight. Indeed, he took pride in the fact that quite a few of his patients came to sessions early so they could get “free time” with his wife before their official session began. (CRT, p. 260)

Verbally quick, he loved puns, vivid expressions, clever turns of phrase and especially jokes. His office became an informal joke exchange, and some patients strived to bring a new joke to each session, confident that they would be rewarded by new ones to take away. Occasionally, a patient reported that they had told a joke at a party and was then approached by a stranger who asked if they were seeing Andrew Salter. (CRT, p. 246)

== Early life and education ==
Salter's intellectual gifts were recognized in elementary school: researchers from the Gesell Institute at Yale interviewed and tested him repeatedly as a child, and his parents fostered his intellectual interests. The family moved from Waterbury to New York City when Andrew was fourteen, first living in two rooms behind his father's store, then moving to an apartment. (CRT, p. 238)

As a boy he was fascinated by magic tricks and cryptography and frequented a magic shop in Manhattan, listening to older magicians and learning tricks. He was fascinated by the ways in which they manipulated attention in their work. He wrote a (paid) weekly column on codes and cryptography for the New York World in his early teens. His interest in conditioning arose in part from these youthful observations of the ways magicians manipulated attention and suggestion to achieve some of their effects.(CRT, p. 238)

Salter graduated from Morris High school in the Bronx, New York, and entered the uptown campus of NYU in 1931, majoring in physics. He found physics unsatisfying and dropped out of college for two years to spend most of his time at the New York Public Library. He read deeply in hypnosis and psychology, preferring Pavlov, Bekhterev, and the Russians to Freud and his followers.(CRT, p. 238)

He read widely about yogis and mystics, about popular ideas on hypnosis through the years, and about the mastery of suggestibility practiced by the stage and parlor magicians he had encountered as an adolescent. In his time out of college during the height of the Great Depression, he also spent time as a union organizer and enjoyed debating Communists on the street corners of the Bronx from his youthful perspective as a Socialist. (He retained his dislike of Communism as he grew older, though not his beliefs as a democratic socialist.) (CRT, p. 238)

Upon returning to NYU he switched his major to psychology and graduated in 1937 with a B.S., ending his formal involvement with an academic institution.

== Professional career ==
Salter was determined to do something important in psychology building on learning theory and behaviorist psychology, but “had no desire to spend the rest of my life studying the reactions of rats lost in labyrinths”. With only his B.S. from NYU, he started his clinical practice in Manhattan in 1941—which he continued for 55 years until a few months before his death in 1996.

He had been interested in hypnosis for years. (CRT, p. 239) He became convinced that hypnosis was deeply linked with the phenomena of conditioning being investigated in laboratory animals by the behaviorists of that era, and began to use hypnosis with stutterers, nail-biters, and some phobics. Within a few years he had developed his ideas sufficiently to write the article Three Techniques of Autohypnosis, eventually accepted by Clark Hull for the Journal of General Psychology after he “Americanized” his name from Saltzman. This article clarified the concept of self-hypnosis, introduced the idea of using it in therapy, and presented three practical methods for self-hypnosis.

This brief article in a professional journal by an unknown 27-year-old was discussed approvingly in the New York Times, Time magazine, and in an extensive article in Life magazine, after which he always had a waiting list. The Time article was titled “Everyman His Own Svengali,” complete with a photograph of Salter. The publicity from major publications, and Salter's own diligent work, helped him develop a clinical practiced that thrived from the time he moved his office from the Waldorf Astoria to 1000 Park Avenue in 1943 until he stopped seeing patients shortly before he died in 1996.

By 1944 he had expanded his ideas on hypnosis into a small volume titled What Is Hypnosis, which also vigorously attacked the dominant Freudian thinking of the day as unscientific and useless to patients. This little book (less than 100 pages) made a strong impact, with reviews pro and con in specialist and general interest publications. The book remained in print for thirty years and was eventually used in many college psychology courses. Its most important feature was Salter's strong argument that hypnosis was a form of verbal conditioning. This early work can be seen as a major step toward cognitive behavior therapy, since it fundamentally involves patients telling themselves things to change how they feel. (CRT, p. 241)

He treated hundreds of patients, honing his methods for brief therapy and constructing an overarching intellectual framework based firmly on the Pavlovian paradigm. As his clinical experience accumulated, his techniques expanded beyond hypnosis to conditioning more broadly, specifically conditioning focused on making people more “excitatory” and less “inhibitory,” ideas explicitly credited to Pavlov when he documented them later in his most important book, Conditioned Reflex Therapy in 1949. When the book was published, Freud had died just a few years before, Joseph Wolpe was still conducting his early research in South Africa, and psychoanalysis was the dominant approach to treating psychological issues. “The American century” was well underway—World War II had just ended, the power of modern science had been demonstrated at Hiroshima and Nagasaki, and the U.S. economy had doubled in size since 1939. Salter's most important work was very much an example of the optimism of his time.

Conditioned Reflex Therapy is largely composed of chapters of case studies, each beginning with explanatory prose documenting Salter's approach to the problems the cases illustrate—shyness, the addictions, problems of the creative, and the like. It introduced many of the key techniques that have become standard in modern psychotherapy: brief therapy; the use of relaxation, imagery, and self-talk to achieve behavior modification, training in assertiveness—an essential application of his key Pavlovian idea of “excitation”—and the use of “homework” in which the patient applies the lessons of therapy to the real world. See below, Professional Contributions.

Like virtually all of Salter's writings, Conditioned Reflex Therapy made its case in clear, lively prose that is still enjoyable today. Salter was extremely proud of the fact that his writing was praised by some of the authors he admired most including Aldous Huxley, Vladimir Nabokov and H.G. Wells.

In 1952 Salter published The Case Against Psychoanalysis, in which he explained why, as he had stated earlier in Conditioned Reflex Therapy, “It is high time that psychoanalysis, like the elephant of fable, dragged itself off to some distant jungle graveyard and died. Psychoanalysis has outlived its usefulness. Its methods are vague, its treatment is long drawn out and more often than not, its results are insipid and unimpressive. (CRT, p7.) The book combined methodological critiques, a review of therapy outcome studies, and what might be called common-sense arguments, as Salter and many others saw them. Since psychoanalysis was by far the dominant method of psychotherapy in the U.S. at the time, the book was quite controversial; as an example, the New York Times published a review by Rollo May that was quite dismissive.

The Case Against Psychoanalysis led Salter to many interviews and television appearances, mostly debates with Freudians. Salter did well in these contests, due in part to his quick wit and excitatory personality as well as the rigor of his arguments. This book led Vladimir Nabokov's wife to send Salter a letter which stated, “My husband asked me to tell you that he read your book with glee.” Gradually, Salter's ideas about behavior therapy began to spread. Joseph Wolpe first came to America from South Africa in 1956, on a fellowship at Stanford; he had contacted Salter earlier, encouraged by Leo Reyna, then also in South Africa. Wolpe's most famous contribution to psychotherapy, “systematic desensitization by reciprocal inhibition,” is largely based on techniques that Salter introduce in Conditioned Reflex Therapy. (See below, Relaxation via Imagery and Systematic Desensitization). Arnold Lazarus, a student of Wolpe's, first came from South Africa to the U.S. in 1963 on a fellowship to Stanford, permanently relocating in 1966, when he began his influential American career and life-long friendship with Salter.

In 1962 the first conference on behavior therapy was convened at the University of Virginia in Charlottesville, followed two years later by the volume of edited conference papers, The Conditioning Therapies. Salter conceived of this conference, helped to invite speakers and attendees, and funded it with money from a foundation he had established a few years earlier to support various research projects.

In 1966 he was one of the founders of the American Association for Behavior Therapy, or AABT—now the Association for Behavioral and Cognitive Therapies (ABCT). The AABT had its first meeting in Salter's living room. Other founders include Reyna, Wolpe, Joseph Cautela, Edward Dengrove, Herbert Fensterheim, Cyril Franks, Leonard Krasner, Arnold Lazarus, Robert Leiberman, John E. Peters, and Dorothy Susskind. It is now the leading professional organization of a scientifically validated approach to psychotherapy that is used all over the world.

Behavior therapy was on its way to becoming legitimized as a central component of clinical psychology. Salter was quite involved in the AABT during its early years, serving on the board and in various official and unofficial capacities, attending the national meetings and often giving presentations which were always well-attended. Gradually, as behavior therapy became more mainstream, Salter's involvement diminished and he began to be cited less frequently, in part because his ideas had been incorporated into the zeitgeist and in part because he had no academic affiliation and essentially stopped publishing in 1964. However, just a few months after his death, he received a Lifetime Achievement Award from the Association for Behavioral and Cognitive Therapies.

In the realm of mass culture, Salter became friendly with the novelist Richard Condon in the mid-fifties. They had many conversations about conditioning and hypnosis and their potential applicability in brainwashing. Condon transmuted those ideas into The Manchurian Candidate (1959). Salter's father's work is discussed at length in the book, and he is mentioned in the movie by the chief North Korean brainwasher, Yen Lo. In the copy of the book he inscribed to Salter, Condon wrote that all those pages about Yen Lo “could not have been written” without him. (CRT, p. 244) Some friends and patients even saw aspects of Salter's personality in Yen Lo's cheerful extroversion and conversational breadth.

Salter was glad that his ideas about “feeling-talk"(CRT, p. 67) became transmuted by others into “assertiveness training” and especially pleased that the growing women's movement found value in his ideas. He cherished the letters and inscribed books he was sent by first-wave feminists thanking him as the women's movement advanced. (CRT, p. 253)

Salter maintained his clinical practice in Manhattan until a few months before his death, working earnestly to help them achieve what he always believed was the essential goal of psychotherapy: becoming happy.

Salter died at home on October 6, 1996, of complications from abdominal surgery.

== Major publications ==
Three techniques of autohypnosis. Journal of General Psychology, 24(2), 423–438, 1941

What is Hypnosis New York, NY: Richard R. Smith, 1944

Conditioned Reflex Therapy London, England: Watkins, 2019

The Case Against Psychoanalysis New York, NY: Henry Holt, 1952

== Excitation and Inhibition ==
As his clinical experience accumulated, his techniques expanded beyond hypnosis to conditioning more broadly, specifically conditioning that was focused on making people more “excitatory” and less “inhibitory,” ideas explicitly credited to Pavlov. These ideas and techniques are the focus of Conditioned Reflex Therapy, formed the basis of his practice until his death, and widely influenced the work of many others to the present day.

Salter's therapy was driven by one essential goal: enabling people to be happier. They came to him because they were unhappy or unsatisfied, sometimes with an identified problem, sometimes with more general malaise. He believed that the path to greater happiness, whatever the problem, required action rather than focusing on insight. “The history of the individual is stored in his protoplasm, and in his actions his history repeats itself. Through psychotherapy we manufacture new history, which repeats itself in his new actions.” (CRT, p. 232)

His recommended action was of a particular kind: being more excitatory (“assertive” in today's language) in their daily lives. “Inhibition becomes excitation only through action.”(CRT, p. 142) This would provide positive feedback and in turn help to form new, healthy habits. These ideas were revolutionary in 1 949. His emphasis on excitatory behavior pervades Conditioned Reflex Therapy. Although his therapeutic strategy was the same for virtually all his patients, his tactics were widely varied and tailored to the personality and life circumstances of the patient, as he discusses in “The Constructive Use of Past Conditionings” in therapy. (CRT, pp. 48–57) He provides a number of examples of how he used elements from his subjects’ prior lives and relationships and their relationships with him – in a possibly unconscious echo of the Freudian idea of transference – to encourage excitatory behavior.

Once they became excitatory in their lives outside the office, they would get positive reinforcement from their actions and interactions. “People are faithful to the grooves in their emotional phonograph records,” he posited, “and rather than bemoaning this, it means that with a masochist we must be stern, with a club man type we must be amusing, and with a scholarly person we must be as analytical as possible.” (CRT, p. 48) The quote concludes: “As I have stressed, there is no communication except in terms of the person being treated.” Or, as he says in the prior paragraph, “We must talk to people in their private, personally conditioned language. Anything else is gibberish.”

While Salter documented his firm belief that all of his therapeutic techniques were derived directly from the theoretical framework he built on Pavlovian principles, even those who admired his work and practices did not fully share this conviction. Goldfried and Davison (1976) note that “While many would disagree with [Salter's characterization] of the relationship between his theory and his practice, he nonetheless occupies a central role in the development of behavior therapy.” (p. 5). Kazdin (1978) agrees that Salter's professed linkages between theory and practice were unconvincing but affirms the importance of its contributions: “Although the specific Pavlovian notions of inhibition and excitation that were posed as the theoretical base of conditioned reflex therapy have been refuted, fuller versions of techniques initiated by Salter are still being employed.” (p. 174) This remains true today.

== Hypnosis ==
In Three Techniques of Autohypnosis, Salter clarified the concept of self-hypnosis, made the case that hypnosis was a form of word association and therefore of conditioning, introduced the idea of using it in therapy, and described three practical methods for self-hypnosis he had developed.

Essentially, Salter taught “subjects” (as he called them) how to rapidly induce a hypnotic trance in themselves, using procedures quite similar to those he used when hypnotizing them. They were to invoke these brief self-induced hypnotic states to reinforce in their everyday lives the learning and changes made in his office via hypnosis. This allows subjects to maintain the desirable effects of hypnosis (such as eliminating nail-biting, overeating, procrastination, and so on), overcoming the common problem of hypnotic therapy that its effects quickly fade. As Salter put it, “Autohypnosis completely surmounts this diminution of hypnotic suggestion.” (p. 435) Second, through this ability to voluntarily reinforce the effects of hypnosis, the subject learns to feel—and actually to be—in control. This increases feelings of self-efficacy (not that Salter used the term) and rapidly “weakens the feeling of dependency upon the psychologist held by most cases under treatment.” (p. 435)

Salter expanded his ideas on hypnosis into a small volume titled What Is Hypnosis, in which he also vigorously attacked the dominant Freudian thinking of the day as unscientific and at best generally useless to patients—a theme he returned to.

== General Contributions to Behavior Therapy ==
Salter was a founder of behavior therapy. He was the first to base his overall clinical approach firmly in conditioning and learning theory, and he also created associated therapeutic approaches and used them clinically. (p. 173) Conditioned Reflex Therapy is widely considered a landmark in the history of behavior therapy. (pp. 202–203) As Kazdin wrote in his review of the 2002 edition of Conditioned Reflex Therapy, “[Salter's] leap from learning theory and research to treatments for clinical practice was novel and groundbreaking.” (p. 408)

And yet, as Gerald Davison put it in his obituary, “Ironically, being an innovator often makes a given contribution less visible. Just as references to psychoanalysis seldom cite Freud, one often encounters ‘assertion training’ and the origins of behavior therapy with no citation to Salter.” (p. 31)

== Cognitive Behavioral Therapy ==
Some methods now used in cognitive behavior therapy (CBT) are also present in Conditioned Reflex Therapy. Indeed, Albert Ellis, widely considered the founder of CBT, thought so: “I was not the first therapist to use what became known as cognitive behavior therapy (CBT), since a few practitioners—such as Herzber (1945) and Salter (CRT, p. 255)—had employed aspects of it previously.” (p. 91)

== Assertiveness ==
Salter's goal of enabling patients to be more excitatory in their lives outside the office is the idea of assertion, stressed in many self-help books. The chapter “Conditioning Excitatory Reflexes” in Conditioned Reflex Therapy is the first concrete description and explanation of how “assertiveness” works, and why it is important for a patient to practice. “Early recognition of the problem of unassertive behavior was provided by Salter,” according to Goldfried and Davison. (p. 153) The “patient was given training in assertive behavior.(CRT, pp. 67-72) in order to substitute a more adaptive behavior for the ‘escape’ and ‘denial’ afforded by ‘hysterical symptoms.’” (p. 262)

Similarly, Kazdin says that: “The use of assertive responses had been advocated by Andrew Salter, whose therapy technique was based upon Pavlovian concepts. Salter claimed successful treatment of several disorders by having individuals behave assertively in everyday interpersonal situations. Wolpe was impressed with Salter's results although he rejected the theoretical basis of the technique. Wolpe used assertive responses for inhibiting anxiety in interpersonal situations but interpreted the technique according to the principle of reciprocal inhibition.” (p. 156) “Pavlov's theory inspired a number of applied behavior therapists, most notably Andrew Salter who developed his conditioned-reflex therapy.... Wolpe's ‘assertive’ response approach represents a very similar technique and conceptualization.”

As part of his excitatory training, Salter encouraged patients to use the word “I” intentionally; indeed, his discussion of General Eisenhower's healthy emotions in CRT. (CRT, pp. 18–22) makes much of his use of that word. One of his “six techniques for increasing excitation” is “the deliberate use of the word I as much as possible.” (CRT, p. 68) Fritz Perls' emphasis on “I-Talk” illustrates the importance of this insight.

== Brief Therapy ==
The idea of brief therapy, and specific approaches to it, originated in Salter's work years before managed care and the strictures of insurance coverage (which, like virtually all individual health care providers, he loathed). As early as 1941, Salter was committed to the idea of brief therapy. He was convinced that successful therapy—“successful” defined as the patient's being happier—could often be accomplished much more rapidly, building on the work of the behaviorists and applying his approach to hypnosis. In the article in Life, the author reports that “The majority of Salter's cases learn the [autohypnosis] routine after five or six interviews, and rarely see him afterwards”—as opposed to the hundreds of sessions commonly required by psychoanalysis.

On the first page of CRT Salter stakes out a typically strong position: “I say flatly that psychotherapy can be quite rapid and extremely efficacious. I know so because I have done so. And if the reader will bear with me, I will show him how... we can... help ten persons in the time that the Freudians are getting ready to ‘help’ one.” (CRT, pp. 7-8)

== Relaxation via Imagery and Systematic Desensitization ==
CRT introduced the idea of using relaxation via imagery linked to positive affect for reducing phobias and anxieties and for changing behavior such as nail-biting, insomnia, smoking, stuttering, and more complex social problems. It also introduced a number of specific techniques for inducing relaxation and employing imagery. The method of systematic desensitization, later named and elaborated by Joseph Wolpe (who had just finished training as a psychiatrist in South Africa when Conditioned Reflex Therapy appeared) is a detailed application of Salter's approach to phobias and related disorders, though Salter used relaxation and imagery much more broadly,

Kazdin observed, “Salter (1949) may have been the first to employ imagery in behavior modification. He manipulated imagery to alter the client's mood and feelings in the therapy sessions as well as in his everyday experience to overcome maladaptive reactions such as anxiety. In therapy, Salter's use of imagery paralleled desensitization very closely.” (p. 222)

The core of “systematic desensitization” is the association of a positive response, typically relaxation, with aversive stimuli. This concept pervades the case studies in Conditioned Reflex Therapy. Various academic psychologists support Salter's primacy. Two quotations above from Kazdin (pp. 156 and 222) and one from Franks (p. 262) say this explicitly, as do Hazlett-Stevens and Craske: “One of the most influential exposure techniques is the procedure of systematic desensitization developed by Salter and by Wolpe” (p. 223). His obituary in The New York Times also noted his contribution to systematic desensitization: “The therapy Mr. Salter employed encouraged patients to express their emotions and used visual imagery to reduce anxiety. It also moved people past their fears by gradually getting them accustomed to being around the things they feared.”

== Therapeutic “Homework” ==
Salter emphasized the importance of patients being excitatory in their real life outside the office, with spouses, colleagues, friends, and strangers. These interactions would provide positive feedback, thereby producing healthy new habits. This emphasis on homework, rehearsal, or in vivo exposure has become another central feature of behavior therapy as well as cognitive behavioral therapy.

Franks (1969) calls it “instigation therapy,” and defines it as “the systematic use of specific suggestions and assigned tasks in the patient's daily environment....The patient is taught to modify his extratheraputic environment and to apply learning techniques to his own behavior. The approach is best characterized as one in which the patient learns to become his own therapist” (p. 552). He reports that “Salter has applied instigation techniques to a host of neurotic problems” (p. 457). Hallam (p. 63) puts it well: “Salter's aim was to arrange for new emotional experiences through what the person did. What was new about this at the time was his emphasis on action.... His objective was to get the person to do the correct thing by himself.”

== Cognitive Neuroscience ==
Salter was greatly intrigued by what has come to be termed cognitive neuroscience. Of course Pavlov was a physiologist, but Salter's interest in neurology went beyond Pavlov and lasted his entire life. In typically vigorous phrasing, he wrote: “Psychological events are physiological events, and conditioning is the modification of tissue by experience” (CRT p. 232)

His basic theoretical framework – that learning consists of strengthening cortical pathways and that such pathways can be either reinforced or inhibited – has become a commonplace in contemporary neuroscience. His interest in neurology was so great that he and a colleague developed a digital electroencephalograph that was awarded U.S. patent number US 3841309A for “a method of analyzing bioelectric outputs of living things by sensing, amplifying and comparing such outputs with selected predetermined values and providing indications of each occurrence of the departure of a discrete value of such outputs from such predetermined values.”

And he anticipated, in general terms, that progress in electronics might revolutionize investigation of mental processes: “[B]y the end of the century... [p]rogress in electronic miniaturization will allow us to check, in our offices, how the patient ‘really’ felt when he visited his mother last Sunday, or got up before an audience, or had an argument with his wife.” (p. 23)
