= João Vicente de Castro =

Brazilian actor and comedian

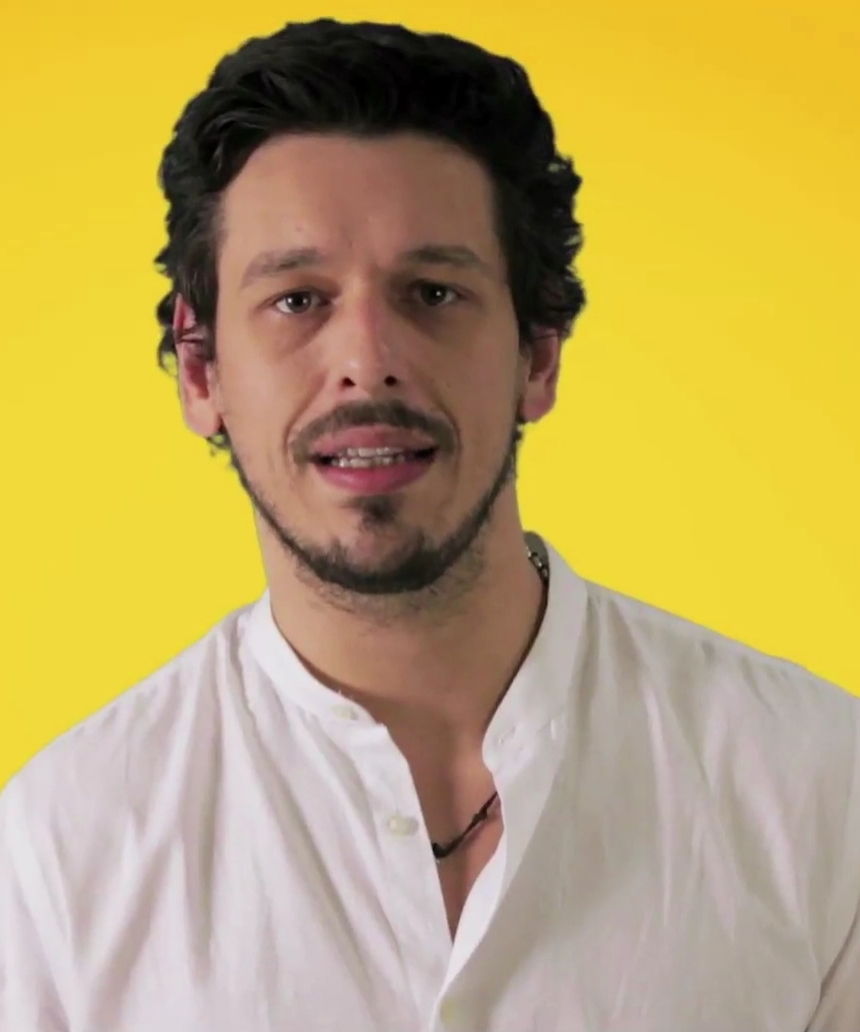
- Born: João Vicente Barbosa da Silva de Castro; March 27, 1983 (age 42); Rio de Janeiro, Rio de Janeiro, Brazil
- Occupations: Actor, comedian
- Years active: 2012–present
- Spouse: Cléo Pires (m. 2010; div. 2012)

João Vicente Barbosa da Silva de Castro (born March 27, 1983) is a Brazilian actor and comedian, famous for being one of the founding members of the video production company Porta dos Fundos.

== Biography ==
João Vicente de Castro was born in Rio de Janeiro, on March 27, 1983. His mother, Gilda Midani (born Gilda Barbosa da Silva), is a wardrobe stylist, and his father, Tarso de Castro, was a journalist famous for being one of the founders of the popular newspaper O Pasquim. He also has a half-sister, Ana Dantas. Castro graduated in advertising and for a while exercised his profession in São Paulo, before discovering his vocation for acting. In 2012 he founded Porta dos Fundos alongside Gregório Duvivier, Fábio Porchat, Ian SBF and Antonio Tabet. Castro's first venture into television was also in 2012, portraying himself in the miniseries O Fantástico Mundo de Gregório by Multishow. In 2013 he reached higher fame after starring as Liosvaldo in the International Emmy-nominated TV series A Mulher do Prefeito, which was broadcast by Rede Globo. In the following year he portrayed Reinaldo in Lili, a Ex, broadcast by GNT. From 2015 to 2016 he portrayed Walter in Fox's O Grande Gonzalez, and from 2016 to 2017 portrayed Lázaro Vasconcelos in the telenovela Rock Story.

In 2014 Castro starred in his first full-length film, A Noite da Virada, directed by Fábio Mendonça, portraying Rica. In 2016 he voiced the character José Tequila in the Portuguese-language dub of the animated film Sausage Party, in his first stint as a voice actor.

Since June 2015 Castro is one of the hosts of the talk show Papo de Segunda on GNT, alongside Marcelo Tas, Léo Jaime and Xico Sá.

== Personal life ==
Castro married actress Cléo Pires in 2010. They divorced in 2012. From 2013 to 2015 he dated television presenter Sabrina Sato.

== Filmography ==
=== Film ===
- 2014: A Noite da Virada – Rica
- 2016: Porta dos Fundos: Contrato Vitalício – Luciano
- 2016: Sausage Party – José Tequila (voice only)
- 2019: The First Temptation of Christ – Melchior

=== Television ===
- 2012: O Fantástico Mundo de Gregório – himself
- 2013: A Mulher do Prefeito – Liosvaldo
- 2014: Lili, a Ex – Reinaldo
- 2015–2016: O Grande Gonzalez – Walter
- 2016–2017: Rock Story – Lázaro Vasconcelos
- 2018–2019 Espelho da Vida – Alain Dutra / Gustavo Bruno de Luris
- 2025: Vale Tudo - Renato Fillipeli
