= Greg News =

2017 Brazilian late-night talk show

- Genre: Late-night talk show; News/political satire
- Created by: Porta dos Fundos
- Based on: Last Week Tonight with John Oliver
- Written by: Alessandra Orofino; Bruno Torturra; Gregório Duvivier
- Presented by: Gregório Duvivier
- Country of origin: Brazil
- Original language: Portuguese
- No. of seasons: 7
- No. of episodes: 170

Production
- Production locations: Rio de Janeiro, Brazil
- Camera setup: Multi-camera
- Running time: 30 minutes

Original release
- Network: HBO; Max
- Release: 5 May 2017 – 29 September 2023

Greg News com Gregório Duvivier (English: Greg News with Gregório Duvivier) was a Brazilian news satire late-night talk show hosted by comedian Gregório Duvivier which aired on HBO Brazil. Inspired in the American Last Week Tonight with John Oliver and produced by Porta dos Fundos, which Duviver is part of, the show first aired in May 2017. Season 1 had 30-minutes episodes, finishing in September. Before the season finale, it was confirmed that the show was renewed for two more seasons. A 21st episode was launched on YouTube in December. Season 2 premiered in March 2018. Despite having the usual artistic freedom from HBO, the show was strictly oversighted by the broadcaster legal department to avoid lawsuits.

Due to the COVID-19 pandemic, season 4 was recorded in Duvivier's house and frequently discussed the pandemic effects in Brazil. During season 5, the show moved to a smaller studio with a reduced production team. Season 6 had a mid-season break during the 2022 general elections due to legal restrictions during the period. In 2024, the show was officially cancelled.

On 11 March 2024, Gregório Duvivier announced the cancelling of the show in his social media accounts. In his statement, Duvivier explained that one of the main reasons for the cancelling was the incompatibility with national production quotas, demanded by local legislation. He highlighted that it happened in part because Porta dos Fundos and other productions were reclassified as foreign production after Viacom became a majority stakeholder of the company.

== Series overview ==
Season	Episodes	Originally aired	
Season	Episodes	Season premiere	Season finale
1	21	5 May 2017	15 September 2017
2	21	23 March 2018	23 November 2018
3	30	29 March 2019	15 November 2019
4	33	27 March 2020	20 November 2020
5	30	9 April 2021	12 November 2021
6	16	18 March 2022	25 November 2022
7	18	28 April 2023	29 September 2023

== Episodes ==
=== Season 1 (2017) ===
No. overall	No. in season	Title	Original release date
1	1	Odebrecht, education in Brazil and Nonpartisan School	5 May 2017
2	2	One year of Michel Temer presidency, judiciary of Brazil	12 May 2017
3	3	JBS plea bargain in Operation Car Wash, Venezuela	19 May 2017
4	4	JBS plea bargain in Operation Car Wash, homicides in Brazil	26 May 2017
5	5	1988 Constitution, elections in Brazil	2 June 2017
6	6	Indigenous peoples in Brazil and Funai CPI, taxation in Brazil	9 June 2017
7	7	Microentrepeneurs and companies in Brazil	16 June 2017
8	8	29 years of PSDB, Brazilian energy policy	23 June 2017
9	9	Livestock and deforestation in Brazil	30 June 2017
10	10	Renan Calheiros	7 July 2017
11	11	Fake news	14 July 2017
12	12	Rodrigo Maia	21 July 2017
13	13	Fidget spinner, Marcelo Crivella and Universal	28 July 2017
14	14	Abortion in Brazil	4 August 2017
15	15	Science and technology in Brazil	11 August 2017
16	16	Angola, pesticides	18 August 2017
17	17	Gilmar Mendes, higher education in Brazil and Kroton Educacional	25 August 2017
18	18	Political parties in Brazil	1 September 2017
19	19	Deforestation of the Amazon rainforest	8 September 2017
20	20	Operation Car Wash	15 September 2017
21	21	Social networks and Jair Bolsonaro	December 2017
Special episode uploaded on YouTube

=== Season 2 (2018) ===
No. overall	No. in season	Title	Original release date
22	1	Human rights in Brazil and Marielle Franco	23 March 2018
23	2	Advertising to children	30 March 2018
24	3	Health insurance	6 April 2018
25	4	Military Regime	13 April 2018
26	5	Refugees	20 April 2018
27	6	Prisons	27 April 2018
28	7	Processed food	4 May 2018
29	8	Lack of housing in Brazil	11 May 2018
30	9	Electoral campaign	18 May 2018
31	10	Plastic	25 May 2018
32	11	Truck drivers' strike	1 June 2018
33	12	FIFA World Cup	8 June 2018
34	13	Liberalism	15 June 2018
35	14	Mobile phone	22 June 2018
36	15	Lula	29 June 2018
37	16	Bolsonaro	6 July 2018
38	17	War on drugs	13 July 2018
39	18	Centrão	20 July 2018
40	19	Feces and sanitation	27 August 2018
41	20	Doomsday and biodiversity loss	3 August 2018
42	21	Holiday Special	23 November 2018

=== Season 3 (2019) ===
No. overall	No. in season	Title	Original release date
43	1	Militias and Queiroz Case	29 March 2019
44	2	Post-truth	3 April 2019
45	3	Education	12 April 2019
46	4	Supreme Federal Court	19 April 2019
47	5	Mining	26 April 2019
48	6	Military Justice	3 May 2019
49	7	Gender Ideology	10 May 2019
50	8	Education cuts	17 May 2019
51	9	Coach	24 May 2019
52	10	Therapeutic communities	31 May 2019
53	11	Fuck Niobium	7 June 2019
54	12	Fine industry	14 June 2019
55	13	Sergio Moro	21 June 2019
56	14	Journalism	28 June 2019
57	15	Vacation	3 August 2019
58	16	Censorship	10 August 2019
59	17	I will never sleep anymore	16 August 2019
60	18	MST	23 August 2019
61	19	Wilson Witzel	30 August 2019
62	20	Patriotism	6 September 2019
63	21	Rigging	13 September 2019
64	22	Trolling	20 September 2019
65	23	Social security	27 September 2019
66	24	Climate crisis	4 October 2019
67	25	K-pop	11 October 2019
68	26	Privacy	18 October 2019
69	27	Holy War	25 October 2019
70	28	Scholarships cuts	1 November 2019
71	29	Oil	8 November 2019
72	30	Draw your own conclusions	15 November 2019

=== Season 4 (2020) ===
No. overall	No. in season	Title	Original release date
73	1	Stock	27 March 2020
74	2	Gerontophobia	3 April 2020
75	3	Health Professionals	10 April 2020
76	4	Delivery	17 April 2020
77	5	Calm Down, People	24 April 2020
78	6	Underreporting	1 May 2020
79	7	ENEM	8 May 2020
80	8	Lightness	15 May 2020
81	9	Herd	22 May 2020
82	10	Health embezzlement	29 May 2020
83	11	Domestic workers	5 June 2020
84	12	Police	12 June 2020
85	13	Basic Income	19 June 2020
86	14	Indigenous People	26 June 2020
87	15	Pet bandit	2 July 2020
88	16	Care	9 July 2020
89	17	General Ideology	31 July 2020
90	18	Inheritance	7 August 2020
91	19	QAnon	14 August 2020
92	20	Day Trade	21 August 2020
93	21	Damares	28 August 2020
94	22	Tipping	4 September 2020
95	23	Guarantor	11 September 2020
96	24	Armed Homeland	18 September 2020
97	25	Chinese Pig	25 September 2020
98	26	SECOM	2 October 2020
99	27	Municipal elections	9 October 2020
100	28	Hundredth	16 October 2020
101	29	Marijuana	23 October 2020
102	30	American elections	30 October 2020
103	31	Eviction	6 November 2020
104	32	Follow the Money	13 November 2020
105	33	Good Night, Family	20 November 2020

=== Season 5 (2021) ===
No. overall	No. in season	Title	Original release date
106	1	Cowardice	9 April 2021
107	2	Carteirada	16 April 2021
108	3	Food	23 April 2021
109	4	Amazon Militias	30 April 2021
110	5	Schools opening	7 May 2021
111	6	Proxy war	14 May 2021
112	7	Playpen	21 May 2021
113	8	Brasil Paralelo	28 May 2021
114	9	Salles' Angels (Aline Sleutjes, Bia Kicis and Carla Zambelli)	4 June 2021
115	10	Ricardo Salles	11 June 2021
116	11	Money We Have	18 June 2021
117	12	Stop Suffering	25 June 2021
118	13	Theocracy	2 July 2021
119	14	Arthur Lira	9 July 2021
120	15	He Felt It	16 July 2021
121	16	Military coup	23 July 2021
122	17	Printed vote	30 July 2021
123	18	Eletrobras	6 August 2021
124	19	Climate despair	13 August 2021
125	20	Tramp	20 August 2021
126	21	Independansse Dey	27 August 2021
127	22	Roberto Jefferson	17 September 2021
128	23	Jovem Pan	24 September 2021
129	24	Public servant	1 October 2021
130	25	CACs	8 October 2021
131	26	Prevent Senior	15 October 2021
132	27	Toxic positivity	22 October 2021
133	28	Memory	29 October 2021
134	29	Third Way	5 November 2021
135	30	Dream	12 November 2021

=== Season 6 (2022) ===
No. overall	No. in season	Title	Original release date
136	1	Adolescence	18 March 2022
137	2	In defense of Agro	25 March 2022
138	3	The Brazilian bomb	1 April 2022
139	4	Decency	8 April 2022
140	5	Geraldo Alckmin	15 April 2022
141	6	Petrobras	22 April 2022
142	7	Advertising	29 April 2022
143	8	Elon Musk	6 May 2022
144	9	Fear	3 June 2022
145	10	Earth	10 June 2022
146	11	Persuasion	17 June 2022
147	12	Children	24 June 2022
148	13	Cry More	4 November 2022
149	14	Clearance Sale	11 November 2022
150	15	Denazification	18 November 2022
151	16	Letter to Lula	25 November 2022

=== Season 7 (2023) ===
No. overall	No. in season	Title	Original release date
152	1	Lula and the Supreme Court	28 April 2023
153	2	AMAN	5 May 2023
154	3	System	12 May 2023
155	4	New Brazilian secondary education	19 May 2023
156	5	Fake News Bill	26 May 2023
157	6	Pragmatism	2 June 2023
158	7	BR-319	9 June 2023
159	8	Free-fare	16 June 2023
160	9	Maceió sinks	23 June 2023
161	10	BET	30 June 2023
162	11	Semi-presidentialism	11 August 2023
163	12	Fracking	18 August 2023
164	13	Milestone Thesis	25 August 2023
165	14	I Warned You	1 September 2023
166	15	Psychoanalysis	8 September 2023
167	16	Guardianship Council	15 September 2023
168	17	Javier Milei	22 September 2023
169	18	Luxury	29 September 2023
