= Viral (web series) =

- Created by: Fábio Porchat
- Written by: Fábio Porchat
- Starring: Gregório Duvivier; Fábio Porchat; Antonio Pedro Tabet; Thati Lopes
- Country of origin: Brazil
- Original language: Portuguese
- No. of seasons: 1
- No. of episodes: 4

Production
- Production locations: Rio de Janeiro, RJ
- Running time: 15 minutes
- Production company: Porta dos Fundos

Original release
- Network: YouTube
- Release: April 5, 2014

Viral is a Brazilian comedy web series by comedy group Porta dos Fundos, in which Gregório Duvivier stars as Beto, a man who after discovering that is carrying the HIV virus, decides to seek the latest eight women with whom he had sexual intercourse to give the news and try to find out who is the possible transmitter.

The series consists of four webisodes, the first webisode premiered on April 5, 2014, at the Porta dos Fundos' YouTube channel.

== Webisodes ==
Episode number	Original air date	Directed by	Written by	Cast
1	April 5, 2014	Ian SBF	Fábio Porchat	Gregório Duvivier, Fábio Porchat and Thati Lopes
2	April 12, 2014	Ian SBF	Fábio Porchat	Gregório Duvivier, Fábio Porchat, Rafael Infante, Carol Abras and Nataly Mega
3	April 19, 2014	Ian SBF	Fábio Porchat	Gregório Duvivier, Fábio Porchat, Clarice Falcão, Renata Ricci, Julia Rabello and Fernanda Rodrigues
4	April 26, 2014	Ian SBF	Fábio Porchat	Gregório Duvivier, Fábio Porchat, Mabel Cezar, Juliana Knust, Letícia Guimarães, Antonio Tabet and Camillo Borges

== Conception ==
Porchat came up with the idea for Viral during a trip to Africa, a continent where HIV/AIDS is a serious public health issue. The inspiration came after he watched the film 50/50, in which the young Adam (Joseph Gordon-Levitt) discovers he has cancer and learns to deal with the problem with the support of a friend. Another inspiration was the episode "Sex Ed" of the American television comedy series The Office, in which the character Michael Scott (Steve Carell) contacts all his ex-girlfriends after being told that his cold sore is a form of herpes.
