= Tati Bernardi =

Brazilian writer (born 1979)

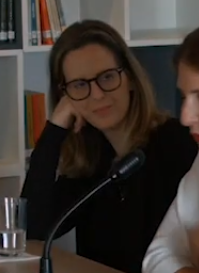
- Tati Bernardi in FOLIO - Óbidos International Literary Festival, 2019
- Born: Tatiane Bernardi Teixeira Pinto; April 29, 1979 (age 47); São Paulo, Brazil
- Education: Mackenzie Presbyterian University
- Occupations: Short story writer, novelist, chronicler, screenwriter, journalist
- Writing career
- Years active: 2006–present
- Genres: Chick lit, young adult fiction, crônica
- Notable works: A Mulher que Não Prestava; Tô com Vontade de Uma Coisa que Eu Não Sei o que É Depois a Louca Sou Eu
- Notable awards: Diploma Bertha Lutz (2017)

Tatiane "Tati" Bernardi Teixeira Pinto (born April 29, 1979) is a Brazilian short story writer, novelist, cronista, screenwriter and journalist. Her works are particularly directed towards young women.

== Biography ==
Bernardi was born in São Paulo on April 29, 1979, and is of Italian descent. She graduated in Advertising at the Mackenzie Presbyterian University and, after working on numerous advertising agencies, she became an in-house screenwriter for Rede Globo. She has written for telenovelas such as Sangue Bom and A Vida da Gente, talk shows such as Amor e Sexo, and sitcoms such as Aline (based on Adão Iturrusgarai's eponymous comic strip), Dicas de um Sedutor and Meu Passado Me Condena; the latter has been broadcast by Multishow from 2012 to 2015. In 2011 she wrote her first screenplay to a full-length film, Qualquer Gato Vira-Lata. In 2013 she wrote the screenplay for a commercially successful film adaptation of Meu Passado Me Condena, in which actors Fábio Porchat and Miá Mello reprised their roles. A sequel, also written by Bernardi, premiered in 2015, and in the same year she wrote a novelization which serves as a spin-off of both films.

In 2006 Bernardi published her first short story book, A Mulher que Não Prestava, which was followed by Tô com Vontade de uma Coisa que Eu Não Sei o que É in 2008. In the same year she also wrote A Menina da Árvore, geared towards preteen girls. In 2010 she wrote her first novel for young adults, A Menina que Pensava Demais. In an interview to Trip magazine dating from 2011, she stated that she was working on an independent, crowdfunded collaborative book entitled A Vaca, which was eventually released in the following year in limited run, with illustrations by Nando Rodriguez. In 2016 she published the anthology of autobiographical crônicas Depois a Louca Sou Eu, adapted into an eponymous movie by Júlia Rezende, starring Débora Falabella, which premiered on February 25, 2021.

Bernardi has also written for magazines such as Viagem e Turismo, Trip and VIP, and since 2013 has a weekly column published every Friday in the newspaper Folha de S.Paulo. On June 28, 2018, she published a compilation of some of her best crônicas written for the Folha de S.Paulo, entitled Homem-Objeto e Outras Coisas Sobre Ser Mulher.

On May 9, 2020, she published the novel Você Nunca Mais Vai Ficar Sozinha.

On March 8, 2017, Bernardi won the Diploma Bertha Lutz prize, awarded by the Brazilian Federal Senate.

== Bibliography ==
- Bernardi, Tati (2006). A Mulher que Não Prestava. São Paulo: Panda Books. ISBN 8576950359.
- Bernardi, Tati (2008). Tô com Vontade de Uma Coisa que Eu Não Sei o que É. São Paulo: Panda Books. ISBN 9788588948860.
- Bernardi, Tati (2008). A Menina da Árvore. São Paulo: Moderna. ISBN 9788516060404.
- Bernardi, Tati (2010). A Menina que Pensava Demais. São Paulo: Seoman. ISBN 9788598903170.
- Bernardi, Tati et alii (2012). A Vaca. São Paulo: Self-published.
- Bernardi, Tati (2015). Meu Passado Me Condena. São Paulo: Paralela. ISBN 9788584390014.
- Bernardi, Tati (2016). Depois a Louca Sou Eu. São Paulo: Cia. das Letras. ISBN 9788535926576.
- Bernardi, Tati (2018). Homem-Objeto e Outras Coisas Sobre Ser Mulher. São Paulo: Cia. das Letras. ISBN 9788535931211.
- Bernardi, Tati (2020). Você Nunca Mais Vai Ficar Sozinha. São Paulo: Cia. das Letras. ISBN 9788535933413.
