= Tarso de Castro =

- Born: 11 September 1941; Passo Fundo, Rio Grande do Sul, Brazil
- Died: 20 May 1991 (aged 49); São Paulo, São Paulo, Brazil
- Occupation: Journalist
- Children: João Vicente de Castro

Tarso de Castro (11 September 1941 – 20 May 1991) was a Brazilian journalist who was active from the 1960s to the 1980s.

Castro was born on 11 September 1941 in Passo Fundo, in the state of Rio Grande do Sul. He was the son of Múcio de Castro, the director and consolidator of a local newspaper, O Nacional. Tarso was the creator of the Folhetim journal in Folha de S.Paulo. He was also the founder of the controversial magazine O Pasquim, of which he was the editor for 80 editions, together with Jaguar, Sérgio Cabral, Luiz Carlos Maciel, among others. Journalist Tom Cardoso wrote his biography, Tarso de Castro -75 kg de Músculos e Fúria, released in 2005 by Planeta.

Castro was an alcoholic who never received treatment, and would later die on 20 May 1991 in São Paulo of cirrhosis at 49 years old.

He is the father of actor and publicist João Vicente de Castro.
