= Homens? =

Brazilian comedy television series

- Genre: Comedy
- Starring: Gabriel Godoy; Raphael Logam; Gabriel Louchard; Fábio Porchat; Rafael Portugal; Lorena Comparato; Gisele Fróes; Giselle Itié; Miá Mello; Cintia Rosa
- Country of origin: Brazil
- Original language: Portuguese
- No. of seasons: 2
- No. of episodes: 16

Production
- Production company: Porta dos Fundos

Original release
- Network: Comedy Central (Brazil); Amazon Prime Video
- Release: March 18, 2019 – June 2, 2020

Homens? (transl. Men?) is a Brazilian comedy television series that premiered on Comedy Central in Brazil on March 18, 2019. After the television debut, each episode was made available on the Amazon Prime Video service.

== Premise ==
The series follows Gustavo (Gabriel Godoy), Pedrinho (Raphael Logam), Pedro (Gabriel Louchard) and Alexandre (Fábio Porchat), four longtime friends who feel lost as the contemporary world reinvents and women are empowered. They understand that they were created in a sexist way and want to modify their behavior, but they find it difficult in the middle of the process.

== Cast ==
- Gabriel Godoy as Gustavo
- Raphael Logam as Pedrinho
- Gabriel Louchard as Pedro Alvarenga Sampaio
- Fábio Porchat as Alexandre
- Rafael Portugal
- Lorena Comparato as Tainá
- Gisele Fróes as Simone Levi
- Giselle Itié as Cris Macedo
- Miá Mello as Mari
- Cintia Rosa as Dani
- Giselle Batista as Natasha
- Maytê Piragibe as Rachel
- Dhu Moraes as Sophia
- Adriano Garib as Marcelo
- Julianne Trevisol as Lua
- Lua Blanco as Maria Teixeira
- André Mattos as Gustavo's father
