= Ciro Pessoa =

Brazilian singer (1957–2020)

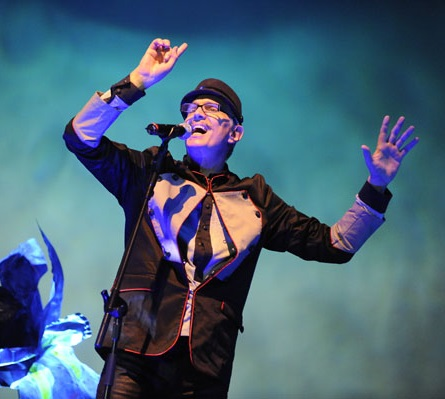
- Pessoa performing at the Ibirapuera Auditorium in 2010

Background information
- Also known as: Tenzin Chöpel
- Born: Ciro Pessoa Mendes Corrêa; June 12, 1957; São Paulo, São Paulo, Brazil
- Died: May 5, 2020 (aged 62) São Paulo, São Paulo, Brazil
- Genres: Pop rock, post-punk, psychedelic rock
- Occupations: Singer, musician, songwriter
- Instruments: Vocals; guitar
- Years active: 1981–2020
- Labels: Voiceprint Records, Rosa Celeste

Ciro Pessoa Mendes Corrêa (12 June 1957 – 5 May 2020), also known by his Dharma name Tenzin Chöpel, was a Brazilian singer who was one of the founding members of the influential rock band Titãs. He was also known for his work with pioneering post-punk/gothic rock band Cabine C. He formed numerous other short-lived and lesser known projects throughout the early to mid-1990s before beginning a solo career in 2003.

== Early life and education ==
Ciro Pessoa was born in São Paulo on 12 June 1957. When he was seven years old, he learned how to play the classical guitar. At the age of 12, he began to perform in music festivals around the city. As a teenager, he studied at the Colégio Equipe, where he would meet Arnaldo Antunes, Paulo Miklos, Nando Reis, Marcelo Fromer, Branco Mello, Tony Bellotto and Sérgio Britto.

== Career ==
=== 1980s ===
Being united by the similar musical tastes of Antunes, Miklos, Reis, Fromer, Mello, Bellotto, and Britto, in 1981, they would form, alongside André Jung, the rock band Titãs do Iê-Iê, whose name would be shortened to only Titãs later on. Pessoa never recorded anything with Titãs during his stay with them, but co-wrote some of the band's most famous hits, such as "Sonífera Ilha", "Toda Cor", "Homem Primata" and "Babi Índio", among others. He left Titãs in 1983 due to creative divergences which culminated with a falling-out between him and André Jung. Shortly afterwards, Pessoa formed two concomitant new bands: Os Jetsons, with Branco Mello and Charles Gavin, and Ricotas do Harlem, a soul duo with Fernando Salem. Both bands were very short-lived however, and wouldn't record any albums or even perform any shows.

In 1984, he formed Cabine C, one of Brazil's first and most well-known gothic rock bands, alongside his then-wife Wania Forghieri, Edgard Scandurra of Ira!, Sandra Coutinho of Mercenárias (who would later leave the band and be replaced by also Ira! member Ricardo Gaspa) and Charles Gavin. They recorded some songs and performed some shows with this line-up, but with the exception of Pessoa and Forghieri, everybody would leave the band afterwards, to focus on their respective alternate projects. Scandurra, Gaspa and Gavin would be later replaced by former Akira S. e as Garotas que Erraram members Anna Ruth dos Santos and Marinella Setti. With this new line-up Cabine C released their first (and only) album, Fósforos de Oxford, in 1986; despite being well received by the critics and the public alike, it was a commercial failure. The band would come to an end in 1987 due to judicial problems with their label, RPM Discos, which was founded and managed by Paulo Ricardo and Luiz Schiavon of the eponymous band. Prior to their disbanding, Cabine C was working on a second album, which would be called Cotonetes Desconexos; four songs were already recorded for it, but the album would be eventually scrapped.

=== 1990s ===
Alongside Forghieri, Pessoa also composed the soundtrack of the 1993 film Oceano Atlantis, which was written by him and starred Antônio Abujamra. The film, however, never received a wide release.

As the 1990s went by, Pessoa wrote some songs which would eventually be performed by Ira!, such as "Efeito Bumerangue", "Tantas Nuvens", "A Natureza Sobre Nós", "Mistério", "Correnteza" and "Inundação de Amor" (which he originally co-wrote with Júlio Barroso of Gang 90 e as Absurdettes for Cabine C in the early 1980s, prior to Barroso's death), and in 1990 he formed Ciro Pessoa e Seu Pessoal ("Ciro Pessoa and His Personnel"), or CPSP for short, alongside Kiko Nogueira, Roger "Vapt-Vupt" Lima, former Ira! member Fábio Scattone and Abrão Levin. Contrasting with the dark, gothic sound Cabine C had developed, CPSP moved towards a brighter and more pop rock-inflected direction which was, according to Pessoa, influenced by Jovem Guarda singers such as Odair José, Roberto Carlos and Jerry Adriani. They never recorded any albums, but toured extensively around the state of São Paulo before disbanding. Pessoa also began writing some articles, travel accounts and prose poems for some magazines and newspapers around this time, such as Playboy, the Folha de S.Paulo and its weekly magazine, Superinteressante, Galileu, VIP and Viagem e Turismo; "Caminho Afora" (2002) and "O Mundo dos Sonhos" (2004), two travel accounts he wrote for the latter, the first one regarding the Camino de Santiago, were awarded the Prêmio Abril de Jornalismo. Most of Pessoa's articles and poems are compiled on his official WordPress blog, "O Mundo de Mantraman", as well as on his Tumblr page.

In the mid-1990s, Pessoa formed another short-lived project, Ciro Pessoa & Ventilador, alongside former CPSP bandmates Kiko Nogueira and Fábio Scattone, and new members Tchelo Nogueira (Kiko's brother), Laudir de Oliveira, Serjão and Boris. It retained CPSP's pop rock sonority, albeit adding more experimental elements. They recorded an album, Batuca Aqui, in 1996, but it was only released in 2019.

=== 21st century ===
In 2001, Pessoa and Branco Mello wrote the music and lyrics for a children's concept album, Eu e Meu Guarda-Chuva, about a boy named Eugênio and his trustworthy umbrella. The album was adapted into a book (written by Mello alongside Hugo Possolo) in 2003 and into a full-length film (directed by Toni Vanzolini and starring Lucas Cotrim, Paolla Oliveira, Daniel Dantas and Leandro Hassum) in 2010; nor the book or the film had Pessoa's involvement, though.

In 2003, Pessoa began a solo career with the release of No Meio da Chuva Eu Grito "Help" on the Voiceprint Records imprint. In 2010 he signed with independent label Rosa Celeste to release his second album, Em Dia com a Rebeldia. A heavily psychedelic and experimental album, it was intended by Pessoa to evoke the 1960s and 1970s bands he grew up listening to, most notably The Jimi Hendrix Experience, Os Mutantes, Pink Floyd, The Beatles and Secos & Molhados, and the œuvre of Surrealist painters and poets such as Salvador Dalí, René Magritte and André Breton. A huge concert promoting the album took place at the Ibirapuera Auditorium in São Paulo in the same year.

Beginning in the mid-2010s, Pessoa became an outspoken critic of the Brazilian petista government and of left-wing politics as a whole, and started to promote a series of video chats disserting about his views on Brazilian politics, frequently accompanied by also musician Lobão and journalist Claudio Tognolli, among others.

His debut book, Relatos da Existência Caótica, came out on October 23, 2015, by Chiado Editora; it is a compilation of five poetry anthologies Pessoa wrote during his early career, but until then remained unpublished: O Labirinto do Sr. Eno, Ecos de um Encantamento Distante, Manual das Mãos, Patagônia Mentalis and Os Emblemas.

From 2010 until it was put on hold in 2016, Pessoa toured around Brazil with his live band Nu Descendo a Escada (named after Marcel Duchamp's 1912 painting "Nude Descending a Staircase"). In 2016 he formed the more pop rock-influenced project Flying Chair. They self-released a 4-track EP in December of that year, available on SoundCloud and physically released on February 11, 2017; it counted with a guest appearance by RPM drummer P. A. Pagni. A second 4-track EP was uploaded to SoundCloud on April 5, 2017, and physically released on May 2. The band's debut full-length was released on July 29, 2017. On March 9, 2018, Flying Chair released their first live album, Ao Vivo na Cena. Their final release was the 2018 single "Sem Orientação", featuring Cachorro Grande keyboardist Pedro Pelotas.

== Personal life ==
Pessoa became a Vajrayana Buddhist in the late 1990s, thus obtaining the Dharma name Tenzin Chöpel, which he used to sign most of the articles he wrote for the magazines and newspapers for which he worked for.

Between the 1980s and 1990s, Pessoa was married to his Cabine C bandmate Wania Forghieri. He married a second time in 2011, with Isabela Johansen, having with her a daughter, Antônia (born 2013). They divorced in January 2016.

== Death ==
On 5 May 2020, Pessoa died after contracting COVID-19 during the COVID-19 pandemic in Brazil while being treated for cancer.

== Discography ==
=== With Cabine C ===
Year	Album
1986	Fósforos de Oxford: Label: RPM Discos; Format: Vinyl

=== With Flying Chair ===
Year	Album
2016	Flying Chair (EP): Label: Self-released; Format: Streaming, CD
2017	Flying Chair II (EP): Label: Self-released; Format: Streaming, CD
2017	Flying Chair: Label: Self-released; Format: Streaming, CD
2018	Ao Vivo na Cena (live album): Label: Self-released; Format: Streaming, CD

=== Solo ===
Year	Album
2003	No Meio da Chuva Eu Grito "Help": Label: Voiceprint Records; Format: CD
2010	Em Dia com a Rebeldia: Label: Rosa Celeste; Format: CD

== Bibliography ==
- Relatos da Existência Caótica (Chiado Editora, 2015)
