= Rafael Saraiva =

Brazilian politician

Member of the Legislative Assembly of São Paulo

Personal details
- Born: March 23, 1993 (age 33)
- Party: UNION

Rafael Saraiva is Brazilian comedian and politician.

Been serving as São Paulo state deputy from 2022 with 98.070 votes for Union party.

As an animal activist, he is the main state leader at the political theme. He worked at Porta dos Fundos.
