= Luiz Carlos Maciel =

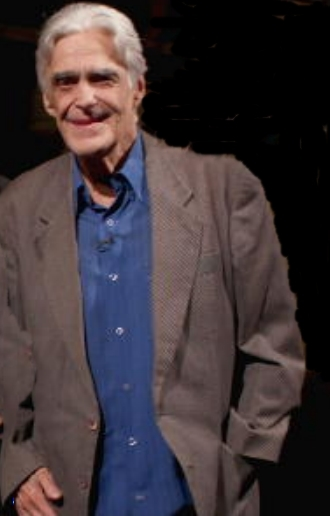
- Born: 15 March 1938; Porto Alegre, Rio Grande do Sul, Brazil
- Died: 9 December 2017 (aged 79); Rio de Janeiro, Brazil
- Education: Federal University of Rio Grande do Sul (BA); Federal University of Bahia; Carnegie Institute of Technology
- Occupations: Journalist, writer, screenwriter
- Spouse: Maria Cláudia (m. 1976)
- Children: 2

Luiz Carlos Maciel (15 March 1938 – 9 December 2017) was a Brazilian writer, journalist, and screenwriter.

== Biography ==
Maciel was born on 15 March 1938 in Porto Alegre. His parents named him as a tribute to Luís Carlos Prestes.

He graduated with a degree in philosophy in 1958 from the Federal University of Rio Grande do Sul. While studying there, he was a director and amateur theatre actor, participating in theatre groups such as Clube de Teatro, Teatro Universitário, and Teatro de Equipe. In 1959, he received a scholarship to study at the theatre school of the Federal University of Bahia. During this time, he met Glauber Rocha, João Ubaldo Ribeiro, and Caetano Veloso, among others. He was the main actor of Rocha's short film A cruz na praça.

In 1960, Maciel received another scholarship, this time from the Rockefeller Foundation, to attend the Carnegie Institute of Technology, in Pittsburgh, United States, where he studied theatrical direction and completed scripts over 18 months. After returning to Salvador, he was a teacher at the Escola de Teatro and directed various plays.

In 1964, he moved to Rio de Janeiro, where he lectured at the Conservatório Dramático Nacional and also worked at various newspapers, including Jornal do Brasil, Última Hora, and the magazine Fatos & Fotos. Known for being a "counterculture guru" in Brazil, he became known in the 1960s and 1970s for his ideas on the underground. He was one of the founders of the magazine O Pasquim in 1969. In 1970, along with most of the staff at O Pasquim, he was imprisoned by the military dictatorship, and spent two months at Vila Militar in Rio.

Maciel also edited the counter-culture weekly magazine Flor do Mal, and was the editing director for Rolling Stone Brasil. He worked for 20 years at Rede Globo, becoming a screenwriter, composer, children's program group member and analyst and director of screenwriting. In 1979, he collaborated with the weekly magazine Enfim and, the year after, for Careta, both edited by Tarso de Castro. In 1984, he directed the musical special Baby Gal with singer Gal Costa, as well as the piece Flávia, cabeça, tronco e membros, authored by Millôr Fernandes.

In 1987, Maciel returned to lecturing, mainly screenwriting courses. In 1991, he directed the plays Boca molhada de paixão calada, by Leilah Assumpção, and Brida, by Paulo Coelho. In 1998, his screenplay for the feature-length film Dolores received an award by the Brazilian Ministry of Culture.

== Personal life ==
In 1976, he married actress Maria Cláudia. Maciel died on 9 December 2017 in Rio de Janeiro due to multiple organ failure.

== Works ==
- Samuel Beckett e a solidão humana
- Sartre, vida e obra
- Nova consciência
- Negócio seguinte
- A morte organizada
- anos 1960
- Eles e Eu — Memórias de Ronaldo Bôscoli (with Ângela Chaves)
- Geração em transe, memórias do tempo do tropicalismo
- Dorinha Duval, em busca da luz (with Maria Luiza Ocampo)
- As quatro estações
- Negócio Seguinte
- Sol da Liberdade (with Patrícia Marcondes de Barros)
