= Meu Passado Me Condena 2 =

2015 film directed by Júlia Rezende

- Theatrical release poster.
- Directed by: Júlia Rezende
- Written by: Tati Bernardi; Leandro Muniz; Patricia Corso
- Starring: Fábio Porchat; Miá Mello; Inez Viana; Marcelo Valle; Ricardo Pereira; Mafalda Pinto
- Production companies: Globo Filmes; RioFilme; Multishow; Atitude Produções; Paris Filmes
- Distributed by: Paris Filmes; Downtown Filmes
- Release date: July 2, 2015 (Brazil)
- Running time: 108 minutes
- Country: Brazil
- Language: Portuguese
- Box office: $10,198,232

Meu Passado Me Condena 2 is a 2015 Brazilian comedy film, directed by Júlia Rezende and written by Tati Bernardi, Leandro Muniz and Patricia Corso. It is a sequel of the 2013 film Meu Passado Me Condena, starring Fábio Porchat, Miá Mello, Inez Viana, Marcelo Valle, Ricardo Pereira and Mafalda Pinto.

== Plot ==
The life of newlyweds, Fabio (Fábio Porchat) and Miá (Miá Mello), falls into the rut when differences, which are not few, need to be faced. After Fábio forgets the third wedding anniversary, Miá decides to ask for time in the relationship. When Fábio's grandfather, who lives in Portugal, tells him that he was a widower, he sees on this trip to the funeral an opportunity to save his marriage.

== Cast ==
- Fábio Porchat as Fábio
- Miá Mello as Miá
- Inez Vianna as Suzana
- Marcelo Valle as Wilson
- Ricardo Pereira as Álvaro
- Mafalda Pinto as Ritinha
- Antonio Pedro as Nuno
- Rafael Queiroga as Cabeça

== Production ==
The film began to be recorded in November 2014; the first scenes were shot in Portugal. The cast left Rio de Janeiro for Europe, where the first filming took place, and ended in December 2014 in Rio de Janeiro.
