= Sérgio Cabral =

Brazilian actor, journalist and author (1937–2024)

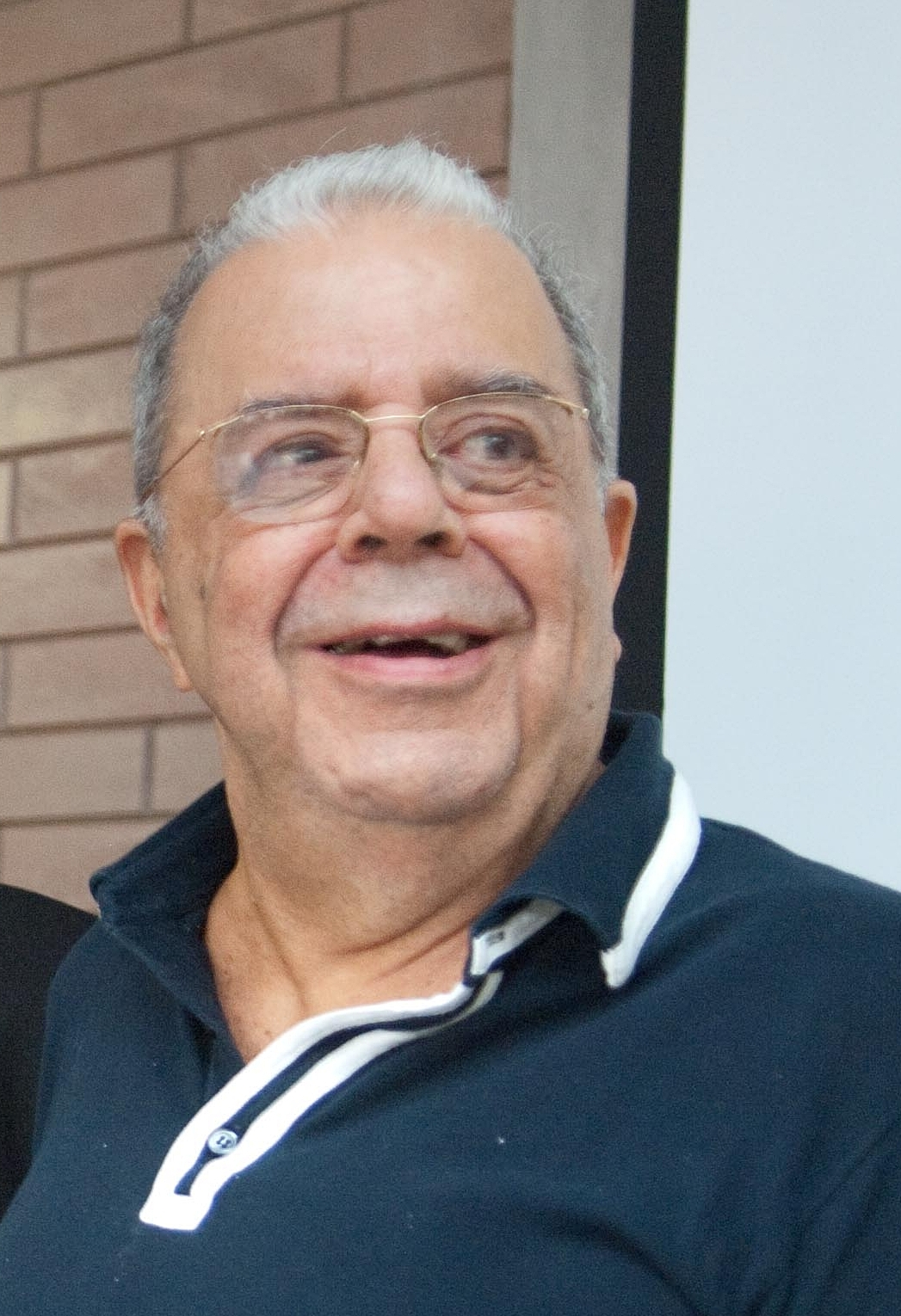
- Cabral in 2010
- Born: Sérgio de Oliveira Cabral Santos; 27 May 1937; Rio de Janeiro, Brazil
- Died: 14 July 2024 (aged 87); Rio de Janeiro, Brazil
- Occupations: Journalist, writer, composer, and researcher
- Years active: 1957–2024

Sérgio de Oliveira Cabral Santos (27 May 1937 – 14 July 2024) was a Brazilian journalist, writer, composer, and researcher. He was the father of journalist and former governor of the state of Rio de Janeiro, Sérgio Cabral Filho.

== Life and career ==
Cabral was born on 27 May 1937 in Rio de Janeiro, in the neighborhood of Cascadura, and was raised in Cavalcanti. Orphaned when he was four, he began his journalistic career in 1957 as a political reporter for Diário da Noite, the afternoon newspaper for the Diários Associados. In 1969, he had become the political editor of Última Hora, and joined with Jaguar and Tarso de Castro to establish O Pasquim. During the military dictatorship, he was at one point imprisoned for his activism through the newspaper.

He also worked as a music producer between 1973 and 1981. As a composer as well, he was a working partner of Rildo Hora, writing the lyrics to songs such as Janelas Azuis, Visgo de Jaca, Velha-Guarda da Portela, and Os Meninos da Mangueira, among others.

Cabral was a city councilman in Rio de Janeiro for three terms, from 1983 to 1993. He was later nominated to be an advisor to the municipal Tribunal de Contas, a position he would occupy until May 2007, when he reached the 70 year old age maximum and was required to retire.

He had been active in the Carnaval scene of Rio de Janeiro, having had connections with many samba schools, such as Portela and Mangueira, since the 1960s. He became part of the jury for TV Globo's samba school competition, gaining a reputation as the strictest judge. He later provided commentary for the Carnaval broadcasts on TVE and on TV Manchete in the 80s and 90s. He also wrote biographies on various samba musicians and other personalities, including Tom Jobim, Pixinguinha, Nara Leão, Grande Otelo, Ataulfo Alves, and Elizeth Cardoso.

Cabral was awarded the Order of Rio Branco in 2014.

Cabral's son, Sérgio Cabral Filho, announced that he had died on 14 July 2024, after three months in intensive care. He was 87. His son confirmed that it was due to a pulmonary emphysema and complications from Alzheimer's disease. People including his son, Orlando Silva, Mangueira, Mocidade samba school, CR Vasco da Gama, Jandira Feghali, and president Luiz Inácio Lula da Silva, among others, gave tribute to Cabral. He was buried at the nautical headquarters of Vasco de Gama at Lagoa Rodrigo de Freitas on 15 July.

== Works ==
- As Escolas de Samba - o que, quem, onde, como, quando e porque (1974)
- Pixinguinha, Vida e Obra (1977)
- ABC do Sérgio Cabral (1979)
- Tom Jobim (1987)
- No Tempo de Almirante (1991)
- No Tempo de Ari Barroso (1993)
- Elisete Cardoso, Vida e Obra (1994)
- As Escolas de Samba do Rio de Janeiro (1996)
- A Música Popular Brasileira na Era do Rádio (1996)
- Pixinguinha Vida e Obra (1997)
- Antonio Carlos Jobim - Uma biografia (1997)
- Livro do Centenário do Clube de Regatas Vasco da Gama (1998)
- Mangueira - Nação Verde e Rosa (1998)
- Nara Leão - Uma biografia (1991)
- Quanto Mais Cinema Melhor - Uma biografia de Carlos Manga (2006)
- Grande Otelo - Uma biografia (2007)
- Ataulfo Alves (2009)

== See also ==
- O Pasquim
