= Monomania (disambiguation) =

Monomania is a 19th-century psychiatry term.

Monomania may also refer to:

- Monomania (Car Seat Headrest album), 2012
- Monomania (Clarice Falcão album), 2013
- Monomania (Deerhunter album), 2013
- Monomania (The Word Alive album), 2020
