= No Meio da Chuva Eu Grito "Help" =

Studio album by Ciro Pessoa
- Released: August 1, 2003
- Recorded: December 2000
- Genre: Pop rock, soft rock, experimental rock
- Label: Voiceprint Records
- Producer: Apollo 9

Ciro Pessoa chronology
No Meio da Chuva Eu Grito "Help" (2003)	Em Dia com a Rebeldia (2010)

No Meio da Chuva Eu Grito "Help" (Portuguese for "In the Middle of the Rain I Shout Out for Help") is the debut solo studio album by Brazilian singer and former Titãs and Cabine C member Ciro Pessoa. It was released on August 1, 2003 by Voiceprint Records. Most of the album's songs were originally written by Pessoa during the 1980s and 1990s, such as "Dona Nenê", which he wrote for and was initially performed by Titãs, and "Papapa" and "Tudo que Me Faz Sentir Você", which he originally wrote while with his short-lived project Ciro Pessoa e Seu Pessoal (CPSP). "Até os Anos 70" is a tribute to French poet Serge Gainsbourg.

The album is available for free download on Ciro Pessoa's official SoundCloud page. In 2019, the album was re-issued digitally in all streaming media platforms by Curumim Records.

== Track listing ==
All lyrics are written by Apollo 9 and Ciro Pessoa, except where noted.

No.	Title	Lyrics	Length
1.	"Papapa"	Ciro Pessoa, Roger Lima	1:36
2.	"Dona Nenê" (Mrs. Nenê – Titãs cover)	Branco Mello, Ciro Pessoa	2:12
3.	"Dúvidas e Sonhos" (Doubts and Dreams)	Ciro Pessoa	3:06
4.	"Days-E."	Apollo 9, Ciro Pessoa, Nasi	2:29
5.	"Boliche Sideral" (Outer-Space Bowling)		2:33
6.	"Miss Belly Dance"		2:40
7.	"Tudo que Me Faz Sentir Você" (Everything That Makes Me Feel You)	Ciro Pessoa, Roger Lima	3:18
8.	"Até os Anos 70" (To the 1970s)		4:34
9.	"Só pra Me Enlouquecer" (Only to Drive Me Crazy)		3:33
10.	"No Meio da Chuva Eu Grito 'Help'" (In the Middle of the Rain I Shout Out for Help)		1:34
11.	"A Deus" (To God)		5:06

== Personnel ==
- Ciro Pessoa – vocals
- Kokinho – bass
- Flavinho – drums, percussion
- Apollo 9 – guitar, keyboards, production
- Helena – backing vocals in "Até os Anos 70"
- Beto Villares – backing vocals in "Até os Anos 70"
- Cláudio Elizabetsky – photography, cover art
