= Eu Não Faço a Menor Ideia do que eu Tô Fazendo Com a Minha Vida =

2012 film directed by Matheus Souza

- Directed by: Matheus Souza
- Written by: Matheus Souza
- Starring: Clarice Falcão; Rodrigo Pandolfo; Leandro Hassum
- Release dates: 27 September 2012 (Festival do Rio); 20 December 2013 (Brazil)
- Running time: 90 minutes
- Country: Brazil
- Language: Portuguese
- Budget: R$ 20,000

Eu Não Faço a Menor Ideia do que eu Tô Fazendo Com a Minha Vida is a 2012 Brazilian comedy-drama film directed by Matheus Souza. The film opened the competitive exhibition at the 40th Gramado Film Festival.

== Plot ==
The film follows the story of Clara, played by actress Clarice Falcão, who agrees to study medicine due to family pressure. Lacking any real calling for the profession, she starts skipping classes while leading a new, parallel life in the mornings, determined to discover, in her own way, what her true talent is and what she really wants from life.

== Cast ==
- Clarice Falcão
- Rodrigo Pandolfo
- Daniel Filho
- Nelson Freitas
- Bianca Byington
- Leandro Hassum
- Augusto Madeira
- Gregório Duvivier
- Alexandre Nero
- Priscila Razembaum
- Camilla Amado
- Kiko Mascarenhas
- Bel Garcia
- Cristiana Peres
- Wagner Santisteban
- Leandro Soares
- George Sauma
