= The Last Hangover =

- Directed by: Rodrigo Van Der Put
- Starring: Fábio Porchat; Gregório Duvivier; Antonio Tabet; Pedro Benevides; Paulo Vieira; Rafael Portugal; Fábio de Luca
- Country of origin: Brazil
- Original language: Portuguese

Production
- Executive producers: Niara D'Ávila; Luísa Espíndola; Tereza Gonzalez
- Editor: Aruan Lotar
- Running time: 44 minutes
- Production company: Porta dos Fundos

Original release
- Network: Netflix
- Release: December 21, 2018

The Last Hangover (Note: Brazilian Portuguese: Especial de Natal: Se Beber, Não Ceie, lit. 'Christmas Special: If You Drink, Don't Eat') is a Brazilian comedy streaming television special produced by the comedy troupe Porta dos Fundos. It was released by Netflix on December 21, 2018.

== Plot ==
The participants of The Last Supper had a night of drunkenness and Jesus Christ disappeared. The apostles then need to find him and unravel what happened the night before.

== Cast and characters ==
- Fábio Porchat as Jesus
- Gregório Duvivier as Judas
- Antonio Tabet as Thomas
- Pedro Benevides as Simon
- Paulo Vieira as Peter
- Rafael Portugal as Diego
- Fábio de Luca as Bartolomeu
- Karina Ramil as Mary Magdalene
- Evelyn Castro as Kenia
- Pedro Monteiro as James I
- Camillo Borges as James II
- Gabriel Totoro as Roman Guard #1
- Victor Leal as Roman Guard #2

== Reception ==
At the 47th International Emmy Awards, the film was awarded Best Comedy.

== See also ==
- The First Temptation of Christ (2018)
