= Carteirada =

Form of corruption in Brazil

Carteirada (Portuguese pronunciation: [kaʁtejˈɾadɐ]) is a situation in which one seeks advantage or privilege due to their position, profession, financial or social status. Usually, it involves seeking minor non-financial advantages, such as using one's status to facilitate obtaining preferences, favors, tolerances, and/or courtesies that would not normally be accessible to ordinary citizens.

== Luciana Tamburini case ==
João Carlos de Souza Correa
- Born: 1962
- Occupations: Judge, 18th Small Claims Court of Rio de Janeiro
- Known for: Luciana Tamburini case
- Spouse: Alice Tamborindeguy (ex-wife)

In November 2014, Brazilian judge João Carlos de Souza Correa gained notoriety for suing a traffic officer who had fined him, being referred to as "the king of carteirada" ("flashing one's credentials"). The newspaper O Globo reported that Carlos' career has been marked by controversies, citing an incident in which the judge called the Federal Police after attempting to enter a ship to shop at a duty-free store. The judge was driving without a license, in an unmarked and undocumented vehicle, and was fined by Tamburini. After an argument, Correa arrested the officer. Correa's conduct was subject to a disciplinary process and judged by the Special Body of the Rio de Janeiro Court of Justice, which deemed the magistrate's posture appropriate. The episode sparked outrage and expressions of support for the traffic officer, demanding justice against Correa in both the media and social networks.

== TAM Linhas Aéreas case ==
Marcelo Testa Baldochi
- Occupations: Judge, 4th Civil Court of Imperatriz

In December 2014, in the city of Imperatriz, Maranhão, Judge Marcelo Testa Baldochi arrested three employees of TAM after being prevented from boarding a flight due to a delay. The judge accused the employees of committing a crime against the consumer. However, years earlier, he had denied compensation for a missed flight, claiming that the fault lay solely with the customer. Baldochi was born in the state of São Paulo, passed a public examination in 2003, and took office as a judge in Maranhão in 2006.

=== Reactions ===
The Brazilian Association of Magistrates (AMB) stated in a note that it considers any action representing an abuse of power unacceptable. The president of the Maranhão Association of Magistrates (AMMA), Gervásio Protásio, declared, "We, the judges of the state of Maranhão, do not condone this type of attitude." The Order of Attorneys of Brazil (OAB) in Maranhão announced that it would file a complaint against the judge with the National Council of Justice (CNJ). The incident became the subject of jokes on the Internet.

=== Other controversies ===
He was previously injured when fighting with a parking attendant over a parking space, and in 2007 labor inspectors rescued 25 people from conditions akin to slavery on the judge's farm in Açailândia.

== See also ==
- Abuse of authority – Unlawful use of powers in an official capacity
- Brazilian jeitinho – Brazilian cultural convention
- Influence peddling – Form of lobbying
- Race card – Idiom
