= Maria Cláudia =

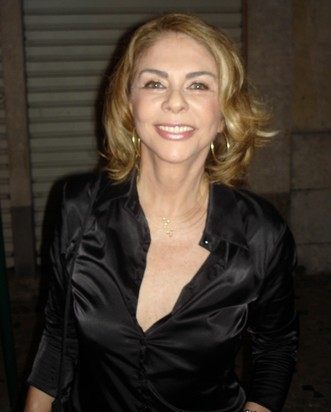
- Maria Cláudia, 2007
- Born: Maria Cláudia de Souza Santos; October 9, 1949 (age 76); Rio de Janeiro, Brazil
- Spouse: Luiz Carlos Maciel (1976–2017)

Maria Cláudia de Souza Santos (born October 9, 1949, in Rio de Janeiro, Brazil) is a Brazilian actress, television presenter, journalist, producer, dancer and model.

She is the niece of actor Luís Delfino. She was elected one of the most beautiful women in Brazil in the year 1978, and one of the most photographed women during the 1970s and early 1980s.

In TV he made appearances in several soap operas such as Selva de Pedra, O Bem-Amado, O Rebu and Feijão Maravilha. But her most striking characters were Shana from the telenovela Te Contei? and Amanda of Plumas e Paetês. Without children, she is married to the philosopher, writer, journalist and Screenwriter Luiz Carlos Maciel from 1976 to his death in 2017.

She had her acting career interrupted by a vocal cord problem in the mid-1980s, from which she recovered ten years later.

== Filmography ==
=== Films ===
Year	Title	Role	Notes
1969	Bonga, o Vagabundo	Sônia	
1972	Independência ou Morte	Empress Amélie of Leuchtenberg	
1976	O Flagrante	Marlene	
1977	Um Marido Contagiante	Helena	
1978	Se Segura, Malandro!	Jô	
1979	O Coronel e o Lobisomem	Esmeraldina Nogueira	
1981	Eros, o Deus do Amor	Annelise	

=== Television ===
Year	Title	Role	Notes
1970	Verão Vermelho	Patrícia	
1970	Assim na Terra Como no Céu	Suzy	
1971	Caso Especial		Episode: "Nº 1"
1971	Minha Doce Namorada	Vera (Verinha)	
1972	Selva de Pedra	Kátia	
1973	O Bem-Amado	Adalgisa Portela (Gisa)	
1973	O Semideus	Estela	
1974	O Rebu	Helena Martins	
1977	Nina	Doralda	
1978	Te Contei?	Shana	
1979	Feijão Maravilha	Abigail Andrade (Bibinha)	
1980	Plumas & Paetês	Amanda	
1981	Terras do Sem-Fim	Margot	
1983	Moinhos de Vento	Sandra	
1983	Pão Pão, Beijo Beijo	Luísa Cantarelli	
1992	Deus Nos Acuda	Kelly Garcia	
1994	Você Decide		Episode: "Tudo Pela Arte"
1995	Você Decide		Episode: "O Gosto da Vingança"
2004	Linha Direta	Maria das Dores Calmon	Episode: "Crime das Irmãs Poni"
2004	A Escrava Isaura	Serafina	
2007	Caminhos do Coração	Drª. Ruth Maciel	Episodes: "September 5–October 9, 2007"
2007	Amor e Intrigas	Eugênia Dutra	
2010	Louca Família	Léa Ferreira (Léinha)	
2010	Uma Rosa com Amor	Mrs. Elizabeth Smith	
