= Em Dia com a Rebeldia =

Studio album by Ciro Pessoa
- Released: 2010
- Recorded: Estúdio A9; August 4/November 4, 2010
- Genre: Psychedelic rock, progressive rock, space rock, experimental rock
- Label: Rosa Celeste
- Producer: Apollo 9, Roy Cicala

Ciro Pessoa chronology
No Meio da Chuva Eu Grito "Help" (2003)	Em Dia com a Rebeldia (2010)

Em Dia com a Rebeldia (Portuguese for "Up to Date with the Rebelliousness") is the second and final solo studio album by Brazilian singer Ciro Pessoa, released in 2010 by independent label Rosa Celeste, which was founded by former Titãs member Arnaldo Antunes. Co-produced by Roy Cicala, who previously worked with bands and artists such as John Lennon, Aerosmith, Bruce Springsteen and The Jimi Hendrix Experience, it is more experimental and psychedelic than Pessoa's previous album, drawing influences from Pink Floyd, Os Mutantes and Secos & Molhados, and featuring imagery evoking the paintings of Salvador Dalí and René Magritte. A music video, directed by Pessoa and Carlito Moreira, was made for the track "Despejar".

The album is available for free download on Ciro Pessoa's official SoundCloud page. In 2019, the album was re-issued digitally in all streaming media platforms by Curumim Records, noticeably lacking the track "Planos".

== Track listing ==
All lyrics are written by Ciro Pessoa, except where noted

No.	Title	Lyrics	Length
1.	"Em Dia com a Rebeldia" (Up to Date with the Rebelliousness)		4:29
2.	"Despejar" (Pour Down)	Apollo 9, Ciro Pessoa	5:21
3.	"Anis" (Anise)		5:28
4.	"Praia de Marfim" (Ivory Beach)		3:52
5.	"Girando na Órbita Zen" (Spinning Around the Zen Orbit)		5:49
6.	"Minha Mulher-Ampulheta" (My Hourglass-Woman)	Apollo 9, Ciro Pessoa	3:12
7.	"Astrolábio" (Astrolabe)		4:00
8.	"Gruta Solar" (Solar Grotto)		3:51
9.	"As Formigas Estão Vendo Tudo" (The Ants Are Seeing Everything)	Apollo 9, Ciro Pessoa	3:08
10.	"Preciso Algo Preciso" (I Need Something Precise)	Apollo 9, Ciro Pessoa	3:04
11.	"Vertigem e Colapso" (Vertigo and Collapse)	Apollo 9, Ciro Pessoa	4:28
12.	"Planos" (Plans)		3:07

== Personnel ==
- Ciro Pessoa – vocals, acoustic guitar
- Marco Lafico – bass, electric guitar
- Zé Mazzei – bass
- Flávio Cavichioli – drums, percussion
- Apollo 9 – guitar, keyboards, backing vocals, production
- Luciana Andrade – backing vocals
- Priscicodélica – backing vocals
- Roy Cicala – backing vocals, mixing, production
- Carlos Freitas – mastering
- Cláudio Elizabetsky – photography
- Carolina Vicentim – cover art
