= Clarice Falcão =

Brazilian actress, singer-songwriter, screenwriter and comedian

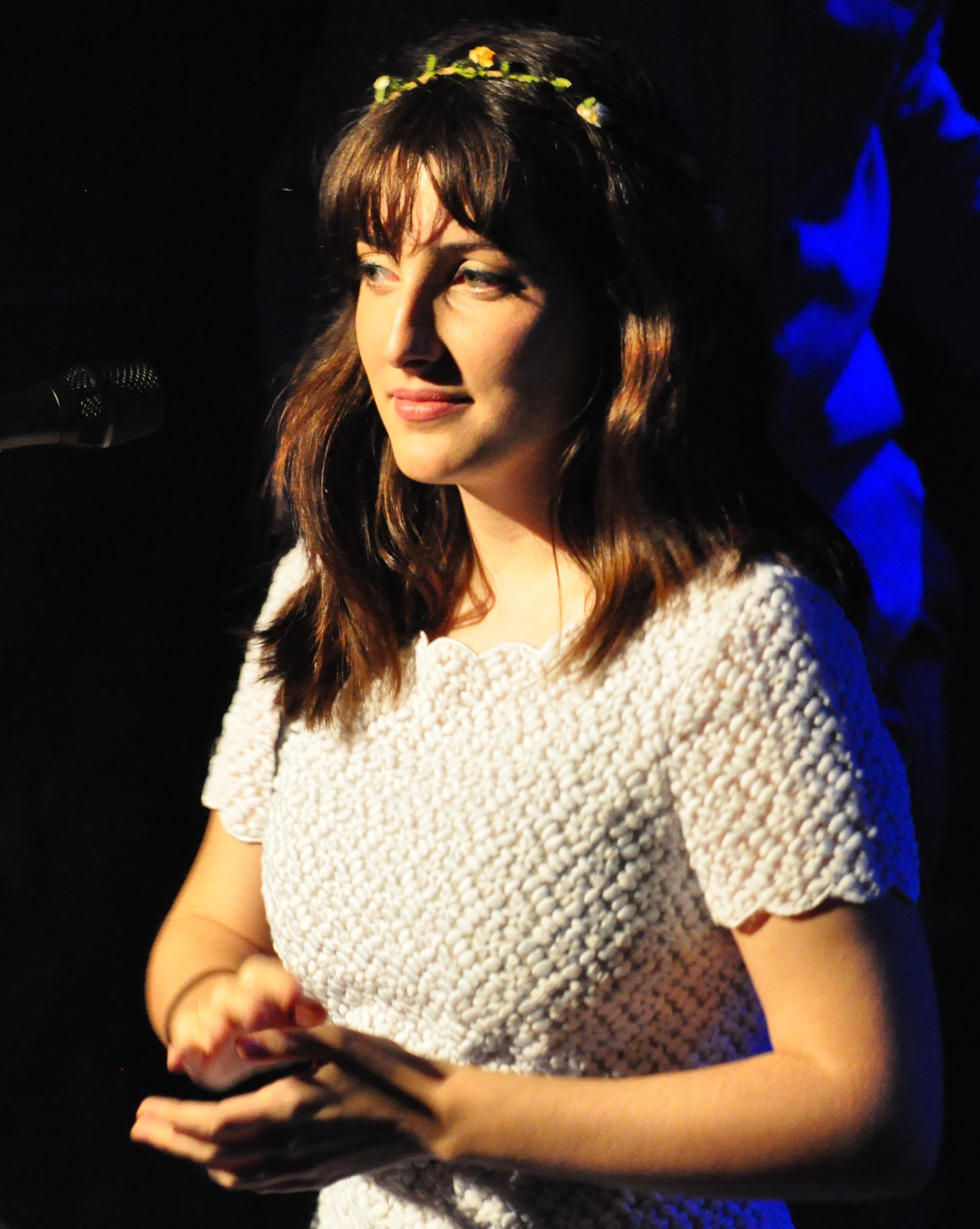

Background information
- Born: Clarice Franco de Abreu Falcão; 23 October 1989 (age 36); Recife, Pernambuco, Brazil
- Genres: MPB
- Occupations: singer-songwriter; actress; screenwriter; comedian
- Instruments: Vocals, guitar and ukulele
- Years active: 2006–present

Clarice Franco de Abreu Falcão is a Brazilian actress, singer-songwriter, screenwriter and comedian.

== Biography ==
Falcão was born in Recife, Pernambuco on 23 October 1989. She moved to São Paulo at age 4 and at age 6, she moved to Rio de Janeiro, where she has lived ever since. She was nominated for the Latin Grammy Awards of 2013 in the category of Best New Artist. She is the daughter of the writers João Falcão and Adriana Falcão, and she has two sisters Tatiana and Isabel. Clarice was also a member of a comedy group called Porta dos Fundos and she is best known for appearing on their YouTube videos.

Falcão is a folk singer, who began her career at age 13 by singing the song "Para o Diabo Os Conselhos de Vocês" for the soundtrack of the movie Lisbela e o Prisioneiro. In 2007, she won a contest organized by Google and YouTube with a short-movie called Laços, directed by Célio Porto and her mother and presented at the famous Sundance Cinema Festival, in which she acted and composed the song Australia – a song which became a hit in the media. In 2008, Clarice acted as Mariana in a soap opera called A Favorita, where she shared the stage with other famous and known actors and actresses, such as Lilia Cabral. That year, she was a part of a band called Melodrama with her cousin Ricco Viana. In 2009, she acted in a remake of the play "Confessions of a Teenager" and in 2010 she starred and was responsible for directing the sound and the script of the short-movie The Phone Next Door – Chamada em Espera".

In 2011, Clarice was a part of a comedy TV show called Vendemos Cadeiras on Multishow. In 2012 and 2013, Clarice acted in movies, such as: Eu Não Faço a Menor Ideia do que eu Tô Fazendo Com a Minha Vida (2013), O Fantástico Mundo de Gregório (2012) and others. Also in 2012, Clarice was invited to be a part of the comedy group, where she acted with Fábio Porchat and Gregório Duvivier. Falcão left the group in 2015.

In 2011, she increased her online presence with videos for song such as "A Gente Voltou" and "Qualquer Negócio". She released her first EP called Clarice Falcão – Singles on iTunes, which had 12 songs, among which there were songs she had performed on her YouTube videos, a remake of the song YMCA by the American group Village People, and a new song called De Todos os Loucos do Mundo. In 2013, she released her first album on the internet, called Monomania. In the end of 2015, Clarice recorded a version of the song Survivor by Destiny's Child in a music video, in which more than 60 women used a red lipstick however they wished to on the video.

The singer's second album was released in February 2016, and it is called Problema Meu. This album was officially released and performed in Recife, Pernambuco and at Circo Voador, Rio de Janeiro, when she presented a new song called Robespierre. This album represents a new "phase" of Clarice, with songs that have a different style from her first album. Clarice states that her first CD was much simpler and that was her goal when she organized it, but she knew that for a second CD, it would be important for it to be different. According to her interview to Estadão, each song in the CD Problema Meu, tells a different story.

On February 23, 2018, she released, in partnership with Kassin, one of the producers of her second album Problema Meu, the song "Coisinha Estúpida." On October 15, the singer was one of the main musical attractions at the BB DTVM Film Festival, which featured screenings of national films.

On March 28, 2019, the singer released "Minha Cabeça," the first single from her third studio album. The song is quite intimate, was recorded in her home alongside friends, and deals with love and maturation. Later, on April 4, she released the music video of the respective track, directed by Lucas Cunha, who also produced the arrangements of the song. According to her, the clip should represent her anxiety.

== Personal life ==
Clarice and Gregório Duvivier married in January 2014, however, by November that same year, ended their marriage. She identified herself as an atheist and a feminist.

She is diagnosed with bipolar disorder.

== Discography ==
=== Albums ===
Record Title	Year	Notes	Refs
Monomania	2013		
Problema Meu	2016		
Tem Conserto	2019		
Truque	2023		

=== Songs Index ===
Work/song Title	CD/record Title	Year	Notes	Refs
"A Garota Que Não Gosta de Meninos"	Singles	2011		
"A Gente Voltou"	Monomania	2013		
"A Gente Voltou"	Singles	2011		
"A Volta do Mecenas"	Problema Meu	2016		
"Australia"	—N/a			
"Banho de Piscina"	Problema Meu	2016		
"Caixa Verde"	—N/a			
"Capitão Gancho"	Monomania	2013		
"Clarice"	Problema Meu	2016		
"Como é que eu vou dizer que acabou"	Problema Meu	2016		
"Coração Radiante"	Singles	2011		
"De Todos os Loucos do Mundo"	Monomania	2013		
"De Todos os Loucos do Mundo"	Clarice Falcão (EP)	2012		
"Deve Ter Sido Eu"	Problema Meu	2016		
"Duet"	Problema Meu	2016		
"Escolhi Você"	Problema Meu	2016		
"Essa É Pra Você"	N/A			
"Eu Esqueci Você"	Monomania	2013		
"Eu Me Lembro (Part. Silva)"	Monomania	2013		
"Eu Sou Problema Meu"	Problema Meu	2016		
"Fred Astaire"	Monomania	2013		
"Fred Astaire"	Singles	2011		
"Fred Astaire" (English Version)	Monomania	2013		
"I'm Nobody"	Singles	2011		
"Irônico"	Problema Meu	2016		
"L'amour toujours (I'll Fly with You)"	Problema Meu	2016		
"Macaé"	Monomania	2013		
"Macaé"	Clarice Falcão (EP)	2012		
"Macaé"	Singles	2011		
"Mais Normal"	—N/a			
"Marlon Brando"	—N/a			
"Marta"	Problema Meu	2016		
"Monomania"	Clarice Falcão (EP)	2012		
"Monomania"	Singles	2011		
"O Que Eu Bebi"	Monomania	2013		
"O Que Eu Bebi"	Singles	2011		
"O Que Você Faz Para Ser Feliz?"	—N/a			
"Oitavo Andar"	Monomania	2013		
"Oitavo Andar (Uma Canção Sobre Amor)"	Clarice Falcão (EP)	2012		
"Oitavo Andar (Uma Canção Sobre Amor)"	Singles	2011		
"Pra Ter o Que Fazer"	Singles	2011		
"Qualquer Negócio"	Monomania	2013		
"Robespierre"	—N/a			
"Se Esse Bar Fechar"	Problema Meu	2016		
"Survivor"	—N/a			
"Talvez"	Monomania	2013		
"Um Só"	Monomania	2013		
"Vagabunda"	Problema Meu	2016		
"Vinheta"	Problema Meu	2016		
"Y.M.C.A"	Singles	2011		
