= Meu Passado Me Condena =

2013 film directed by Júlia Rezende

- Theatrical release poster
- Directed by: Julia Rezende
- Written by: Tati Bernardi; Leonardo Muniz
- Starring: Fábio Porchat; Miá Mello; Marcelo Valle; Inez Viana; Juliana Didone; Alejandro Claveaux
- Production companies: Atitude Produções; Globo Filmes; H Films; Morena Films; Multishow; Paris Filmes; Riofilme
- Distributed by: Downtown Filmes; Paris Filmes
- Release date: 25 October 2013 (Brazil)
- Running time: 102 minutes
- Country: Brazil
- Language: Portuguese
- Budget: R$3,6 million
- Box office: R$34,802,424

Meu Passado Me Condena is a 2013 Brazilian comedy film directed by Julia Rezende, and starring Fábio Porchat and Miá Mello. The film is based on the television series of the same name, and was written by Tati Bernardi. It was released theatrically on October 25, 2013.

== Plot ==
Fábio (Fábio Porchat) and Miá (Miá Mello) are two newlyweds who decided to get engaged after only a month of dating. The couple decides to spend their honeymoon on a cruise from Rio de Janeiro to Europe. However, the two soon discover that an ex-boyfriend of Miá and an old Platonic passion of Fábio are also on board.

== Production ==
Meu Passado Me Condena is the first fiction feature film from director Julia Rezende and has Mariza Leão as the producer. The film is based on the television comedy of the same name, broadcast by Multishow channel, which was created and directed by Rezende and the scriptwriter Tati Bernardi.

The film began shooting in early March 2013, on the cruise ship Costa Favolosa, being the first time that a Brazilian team shot a film on a real cruise. The cast departed from Rio de Janeiro and went through Ilhéus, Maceió, Salvador, Recife, Fortaleza and Italy.

The sequel Meu Passado Me Condena 2 was released in 2015.
