= Monomania (Clarice Falcão album) =

Studio album by Clarice Falcão
- Released: April 30, 2013
- Recorded: 2012–2013
- Genre: Indie pop; folk
- Length: 34:51
- Label: Casa Byington
- Producer: Olivia Byington

Clarice Falcão chronology
| Monomania (2013) | Problema Meu (2016) |

Singles from Monomania
- 1. "Monomania" Released: May 31, 2012; 2. "Oitavo Andar" Released: December 17, 2012; 3. "Eu Esqueci Você" Released: April 23, 2013; 4. "De Todos os Loucos do Mundo" Released: July 30, 2013

Monomania is the debut studio album of Brazilian singer and actress Clarice Falcão. It was released on April 30, 2013 by Sony Music, Chavelier de Pas and Casa Byington.

The album received generally positive reviews from music critics.

== Background ==
Throughout 2012, the singer revealed that the songs "Monomania", "Oitavo Andar", "Macaé" and "De Todos os Loucos do Mundo" would be some of the tracks present on her debut EP and the album.

== Notes ==
- In the concert on 5/25 in São Paulo Clarice did not sing "Oitavo Andar" during the encore.
- "Se Esse Bar" was performed for the first time on 8/23 at Rio de Janeiro, and remained on the set list.
- Clarice criticized religious extremist Marco Feliciano at the Rio show in response to his manifesto against an episode of Porta dos Fundos that made a joke with Jesus Christ: "[Porta dos Fundos] brought me many things, but the best of them was the protest from Rep. Marco Feliciano. In my religion, the most sacred thing in the world is people being able to love anyone as they please."
