= Campos de Carvalho =

Brazilian writer

Walter Campos de Carvalho (November 1, 1916 – April 10, 1998) was a Brazilian writer. An outsider in the Brazilian literary circles during his lifetime, his writing was characterized by ironic humour, iconoclastic and surreal themes.

== Biography ==
Campos de Carvalho was born in Uberaba, in the state of Minas Gerais. In 1938 he graduated in law, having retired as State Prosecutor of São Paulo, where he lived with his wife Lygia Rosa de Carvalho.

His life has always been linked to literature, initially published Banda Forra (humorous essays) in 1941, and Tribo (novel) in 1954 later wrote the novels A Lua vem da Ásia (1956), Vaca de Nariz Sutil (1961), A Chuva Imóvel (1963) and O Púcaro Búlgaro (1964). The author also collaborated with O Pasquim and worked in the newspaper O Estado de S. Paulo, in the period 1968–1978. After 1978 he retired from writing.

Campos de Carvalho died of a heart attack on April 10, 1998, in São Paulo.

== Works ==
- Banda Forra, humoristic essays (1941)
- Tribo, novel (1954)
- A Lua vem da Ásia, novel (1956)
- Vaca de Nariz Sutil, novel (1961)
- A Chuva Imóvel, novel (1963)
- O Púcaro Búlgaro, novel (1964)
