= O Pasquim =

Brazilian weekly newspaper published in Rio de Janeiro from 1969 to the mid 1970s

O Pasquim was a Brazilian weekly newspaper published in Rio de Janeiro from 1969 to the mid-1970s. It was critical of the military dictatorship and it is considered the founding periodical of Brazil's alternative press.

The idea for the periodical began in 1968 after a meeting of cartoonist Jaguar with journalists Tarso de Castro and Sérgio Cabral. They were looking for an alternative to substitute Sérgio Porto's tabloid A carapuça. The name was Jaguar's idea, inspired in the Italian folk-tale character Pasquino, who, according to the legend, used to write and tell stories in a major public square.

As the time went by, prominent figures such as Walter Campos de Carvalho, Ziraldo, Millôr Fernandes, Luiz Carlos Maciel, Prósperi and Fortuna joined the team.

== History ==
O Pasquim was established in 1969. The first edition was published on June 26, 1969. From an initial circulation of twenty thousand copies, the periodical jumped to two hundred thousand copies in the mid-1970s. The paper ceased publication in 1991.

== Miscellaneous ==
The periodical was featured in an exhibition at SESC Ipiranga in 2019.

All of O Pasquim issues were digitalized and can be read on the National Library of Brazil website.
