= Edgar Duvivier =

Brazilian sculptor and saxophone player

Edgar Duvivier (born 27 March 1955) is a Brazilian sculptor and musician.

== Early life ==
Duvivier was practically raised in a studio, as his parents, Edgar and Ivna, were sculptors.

== Career ==
After giving up law, Duviver enrolled in the Berklee College of Music in the United States, before becoming a sculptor. Duvivier is known for sculpting statues of footballers, including Garrincha, Jairzinho, Zagallo, Nílton Santos, and Dirceu Krüger. Besides working as a sculptor, he has worked as a painter, saxophonist, producer, screenwriter and director, as well as creator of acclaimed soundtracks on television and cinema.

In 2016, he created a life-sized statue of Brazilian writer Clarice Lispector at Leme, off Copacabana Beach in Rio.

== Personal life ==
Duvivier is the father of Brazilian actor Gregorio Duvivier.
