= Borges Importadora =

- Genre: Sitcom
- Starring: Thati Lopes; Antonio Tabet; Karina Ramil; Rafael Portugal; Gustavo Miranda; Luis Lobianco; Felipe Absalão; Daniel Belmonte; Pablo Carbonell; Evelyn Castro
- Country of origin: Brazil
- Original language: Portuguese
- No. of seasons: 1
- No. of episodes: 10

Production
- Executive producer: Tereza Gonzalez
- Producer: Mariana Vianna
- Production location: Rio de Janeiro
- Cinematography: Gui Machado
- Editor: Bernardo Pimenta
- Running time: 25 minutes
- Production company: Porta dos Fundos

Original release
- Network: Comedy Central Brazil
- Release: March 13, 2018

Borges Importadora is a Brazilian sitcom that originally aired on Comedy Central Brazil, produced by Porta dos Fundos. The plot follows four partners in a bankrupt import-export firm who turn to making viral videos to pay off debts. The series debuted March 13, 2018. Borges is the first fictional series produced by Porta dos Fundos after the beginning of their relationship with Viacom. The series was licensed by Netflix for international broadcast.

== Cast ==
- Antonio Pedro Tabet as Erasmo
- Karina Ramil as Sônia
- Rafael Portugal as Pablo
- Thati Lopes as Rosana
