= Podia Ser Pior =

2010 film directed by Ian SBF

- Film poster
- Directed by: Ian SBF
- Written by: Ian SBF
- Starring: Fábio Porchat; Tatá Werneck; Danilo Gentili; Fernando Caruso; Gregório Duvivier
- Edited by: Osiris Larkin; Ian SBF
- Music by: André Abujamra
- Production company: Fondo Filmes
- Release date: 2009
- Running time: 90 minutes
- Country: Brazil
- Language: Portuguese

Podia Ser Pior is a 2009 Brazilian comedy film written and directed by Ian SBF, starring Fábio Porchat, Tatá Werneck, Danilo Gentili, Fernando Caruso, Gregório Duvivier, Josie Antello and Wagner Santisteban. The release of the film didn't happen due to a lack of budget revenue for the promotion.

== Plot ==
Rodrigo (Fabio Porchat) wakes up in a strange bed next to a woman who he has never seen in life. Having his jaw dislocated, he rushes to save his relationship while trying to help his friend Murillo (Gregorio Duvivier), who is also with marital problems.

== Cast ==
- Fábio Porchat as Rodrigo
- Gregório Duvivier as Murillo
- Fernando Caruso as Gabriel
- Danilo Gentili as Danilo
- Letícia Lima as Suellen
- Tatá Werneck as Talita
- Paulo Serra as Paulinho
- Paulo Carvalho
- Carine Klimeck
- Josie Antello as Josie
- Wagner Santisteban as Giovani
