= Fósforos de Oxford =

Studio album by Cabine C
- Released: 1986
- Recorded: 1986
- Genre: Dark wave; gothic rock
- Label: RPM Discos
- Producer: Luiz Schiavon

Fósforos de Oxford (Portuguese for Matches from Oxford) is the only album by Brazilian rock band Cabine C. It was released in 1986 by RPM Discos, which was founded by Paulo Ricardo and Luiz Schiavon of RPM. It was the only album to be released by the label, which closed in 1987 after RPM's first break-up.

Most of the album's lyrics are based on works by Edgar Allan Poe; for example, "Pânico e Solidão" was based on his 1838 novel The Narrative of Arthur Gordon Pym of Nantucket, and "A Queda do Solar de Usher" shares its name with Poe's eponymous 1839 short story.

The album was never re-released in CD form, and is very rare and difficult to obtain; however, it is available for free download on Ciro Pessoa's official SoundCloud page, and the track "Tão Perto" was included in the 2005 compilation of Brazilian post-punk music The Sexual Life of the Savages. In 2019, the album was re-issued digitally in all streaming media platforms by Curumim Records.

== Critical reception ==
In its 1987 issue, magazine Bizz gave the album a positive review, favorably comparing Cabine C to British band Magazine.

== Track listing ==
All lyrics are written by Ciro Pessoa; all music is composed by Cabine C.

No.	Title	English title	Length
1.	"Pânico e Solidão"	Panic and Loneliness	2:33
2.	"Lapso de Tempo"	Time Lapse	2:07
3.	"Anos"	Years	3:01
4.	"Jardim das Gueixas"	Garden of the Geishas	4:43
5.	"A Queda do Solar de Usher" (instrumental)	The Fall of the House of Usher	2:41
6.	"Lágrimas"	Tears	2:36
7.	"Opus 2" (instrumental)		3:04
8.	"Tão Perto"	So Close	2:35
9.	"Soldadas"	Soldier Women	3:21
10.	"Neste Deserto"	In This Desert	3:50
11.	"Fósforos de Oxford" (instrumental)	Matches from Oxford	2:10

== Personnel ==
- Ciro Pessoa – vocals, guitar, 12-string guitar
- Anna Ruth dos Santos – bass guitar, backing vocals
- Marinella Setti – drums, backing vocals
- Wania Forghieri – keyboards
- Akira S. (Akira Tsukimoto) – Chapman Stick in "Jardim das Gueixas"
- Fernando Deluqui – guitar in "Tão Perto"
- Luiz Schiavon – production
