= Teste de Elenco =

2011 film directed by Ian SBF

- Directed by: Ian SBF
- Written by: Ian SBF; Osíris Larkin; Gustavo Chagas
- Starring: Fábio Porchat; Tatá Werneck; Letícia Lima
- Distributed by: Fondo Filmes
- Release date: March 23, 2011 (Brazil)
- Running time: 67 minutes
- Country: Brazil
- Language: Portuguese

Teste de Elenco is a 2011 Brazilian comedy film, directed by Ian SBF and starring Fábio Porchat, Tatá Werneck and Letícia Lima.

The film was the first Brazilian feature film released exclusively on the internet for free.

== Plot ==
A theater director (Fabio Porchat) conducts test of cast with girls who share the same dream: to be an actress. However they are psychotic and will do anything to get the role.

== Cast ==
- Fábio Porchat — Director 1
- Tatá Werneck — Actress 1
- Letícia Lima — Actress 2
- Camila Vaz — Actress 3
- Rosa Soahre — Actress 4
- Maria Clara Horta — Actress 5
- Thiago Rotta — Director 2
- Pedro Henrique Monteiro — Director 3
- Rodrigo Gallo — Director 4
- Camillo Borges — Director 5
- Igo Ribeiro — Director 6
- Paulo Mathias Jr. — Director 7
- Kim Archetti — Director 8
- Sílvio Matos — Director 9
- Marcus Majella — Director 10
- Mabel Cezar — Actress 6
- Leticia Novaes — Actress 7
- Ana Felipe — Actress 8
- Patrícia Vazquez — Actress 9
- Vera Maria Monteiro — Actress 10
