= Statistics of the COVID-19 pandemic in Brazil =

This article presents official statistics gathered during the COVID-19 pandemic in Brazil.

== Statistics ==
=== Growth of confirmed cases ===
Growth of confirmed cases; a rising straight line indicates exponential growth, while a horizontal line indicates linear growth. Source: brasil.io

=== Growth of confirmed deaths ===
Growth of confirmed deaths; a rising straight line indicates exponential growth, while a horizontal line indicates linear growth. Source: brasil.io

=== Number of cases and deaths, on a logarithmic scale ===
Number of cases (blue) and number of deaths (red) on a logarithmic scale.

=== Case fatality rate ===
The trend of case fatality rate for COVID-19 from 26 February, the day first case in the country was recorded.

Case fatality rate
