= A Judge is not a God =

Political phrase

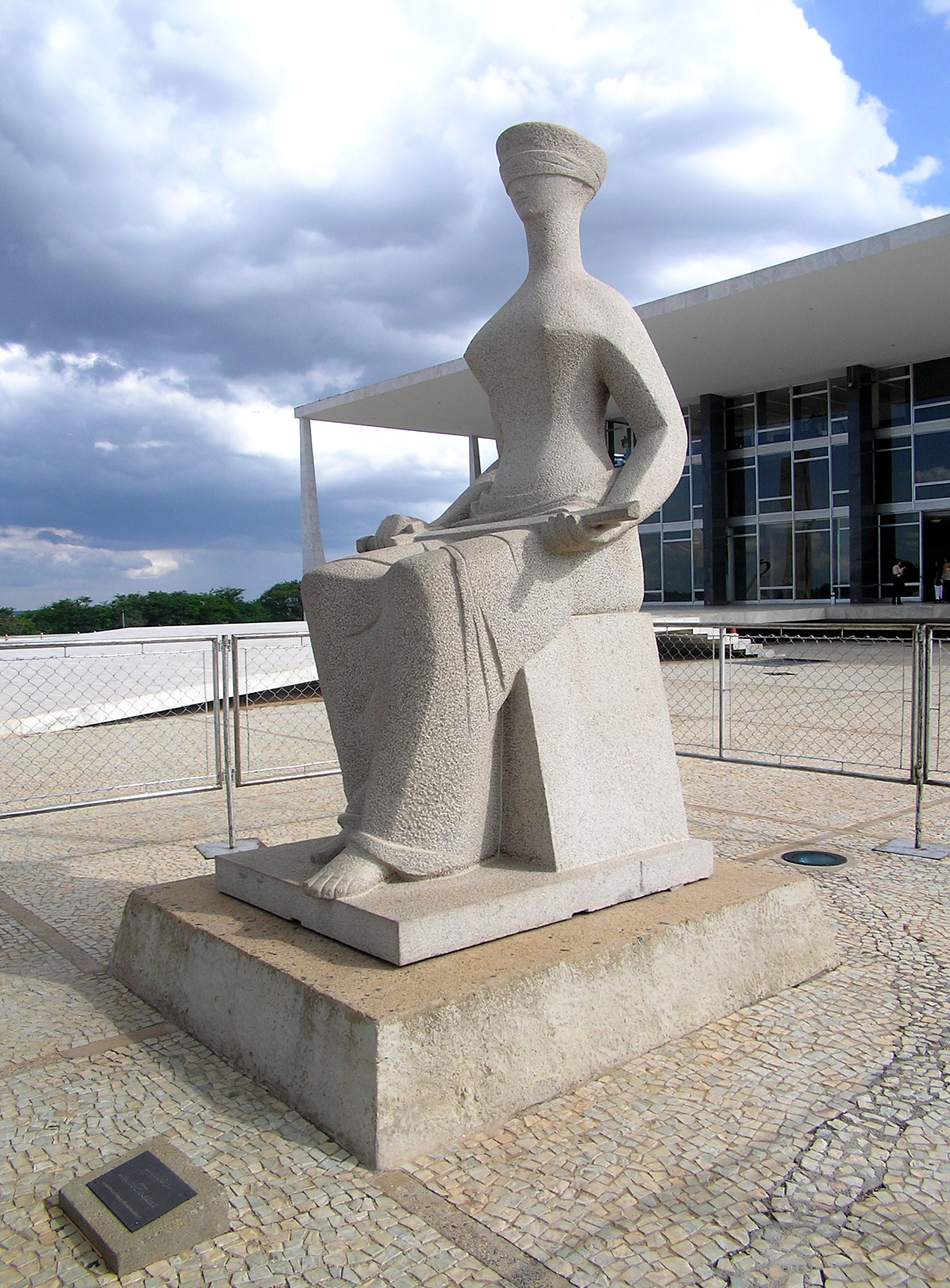
Sculpture "Justice" by Alfredo Ceschiatti. The blindfolded eyes indicate impartiality and the sword symbolizes the strength to enforce the law.

A Judge is not a God refers to the Luciana Tamburini case in Brazil, in which traffic officer Luciana Silva Tamburini was convicted of contempt of court for stating that the judge João Carlos de Souza Correa was a judge but not God.

On February 12, 2011, Tamburini approached Correa at a prohibition traffic blitz. The judge was driving without a valid driver's license in an unregistered and undocumented automobile and was consequently fined by Tamburini. After a discussion, Correa arrested the Tamburini. Correa's actions were later the subject of a disciplinary process judged by the Special Body of the Rio de Janeiro State Court of Justice, which deemed the magistrate's conduct appropriate. The verdict sparked outrage and expressions of support for the traffic officer and demands for justice against Correa, both in the media and on social networks.

== Description ==
João Carlos Correa was approached by Luciana Tamburini at a traffic blitz of the Lei Seca operation on February 12, 2011, driving a Land Rover without a driver's license, license plates, or documents. Correa spoke to the lieutenant in charge of the operation, explaining that he was a judge and, according to Tamburini, asking to be released. Tamburini decided that the vehicle should be impounded and explained the reasons for the fine. Correa arrested her. Luciana then stated: "- He is a Judge, but not God." Thus, everyone went to the police station.

After the incident, Tamburini filed a lawsuit against Correa, claiming to have been offended during the performance of her duties.

The case was tried in the first instance at the 36th Civil Court of the State Court of Justice of Rio de Janeiro, which ruled that the victim was the Judge and not the traffic officer, on the grounds that the officer had acted "with an abuse of power" and had mocked the magistrate by stating that he "was a judge, but not God".

Tamburini appealed in the second instance. In reviewing the appeal, Justice José Carlos Paes argued that "it is only natural that, when identifying himself, the defendant informed the traffic officer that he was a judge", concluding that the judge had not used the alleged "position of authority" as claimed by Tamburini. He believed that the officer "acted with an abuse of power, offending the defendant, despite being aware of his public role" and argued that "in defense of the public role he performs, the magistrate had no choice but to order the arrest of the appellant, who challenged the judiciary itself and everything it represents." The justice also ordered her to compensate the Judge with 5,000 reais. On November 12, the judges of the 14th Civil Chamber of the Rio de Janeiro State Court of Justice unanimously followed the recommendation of the justice of first instance, Andrea Quintella, upholding the decision.

This episode led to the initiation of an administrative disciplinary procedure against Correa in the Special Body of the Rio de Janeiro State Court of Justice in August 2013. The process was conducted in secret, and the judges reviewing the case decided by majority vote that Correa's behavior did not violate the expected conduct of a magistrate "both in public and private life".

Tamburini reaffirms her position that "saying that the judge is not God is a fact, not contempt" and that she did "nothing extraordinary" other than "her job." She believes that this should be regarded as normal. She says she does not regret the fact and that she would "do it all over again," intending to appeal to the Superior Court of Justice. However, in March 2015, the 3rd Vice-Presidency of the Rio de Janeiro State Court of Justice rejected the appeals Tamburini intended to file with the Superior Court of Justice and the Supreme Federal Court. Therefore, Tamburini can still file an appeal directly with these courts in Brasília.

On September 9, 2020, the sentence was overturned and Tamburini was exempted from paying the compensation.

== Repercussions ==
The episode generated repercussions in the media and on social networks with manifestations of revolt against the facts and support for the traffic agent. Correa was referred to in a report by IstoÉ magazine as "the king of showing off". The newspaper O Globo stated in a report that João Carlos' career is marked by controversies, citing an episode in which the judge called the Federal Police after trying to board a ship to shop at the Duty-free Shop.

Rossidélio Lopes da Fonte, president of the Associação dos Magistrados do Estado do Rio de Janeiro (Association of Judges of the State of Rio de Janeiro), although he believes there was no corporatism in the case, stated that the judge should behave like any citizen when facing a traffic blitz.

Armando Souza, president of the Comissão de Legislação de Trânsito (Traffic Legislation Commission) of the Ordem dos Advogados do Brasil (Brazilian Bar Association), Rio de Janeiro, also does not believe in corporatism, but pointed out that he did not perceive "any intention on the part of the traffic agent to offend the honor of the judge, and did not perceive any damages to be repaired by Tamburini." Souza observed that "We are all equal before the law, the judge is also equal and must respect the legislation. We are all equal - be it a senator, a judge, a football player, a lawyer. We all have to respect the law."

The Detran (Department of Traffic) also stated in a note that its internal affairs department analyzed the conduct of the agents involved in the episode and found no irregularities.

The National Federation of Detran Unions, especially the Union of DETRAN/RJ Employees, also issued a statement condemning the court's decision and expressing solidarity with Tamburini. According to the Union, the "driver João Carlos de Souza Correa insinuated that he intended to receive privileged treatment by presenting himself as a judge when approached during the enforcement of the "Lei Seca" operation, engaging in infractions specified in the Brazilian Traffic Code - CTB." They also repudiated "any superiority complex, egocentrism, rudeness, arrogance, authoritarianism, and arrogance from anyone," especially "from someone invested in the judiciary to promote justice and social peace."

The ex-deputy, who was Correa's wife at the time, Alice Tamborindeguy, stated that she agreed with the court's decision and that Tamburini's statement had a "clear intention of mockery." According to Tamborindeguy, the agent should "follow the law but without mistreating people" and questioned "if she does that with a judge, what will she do with an ordinary citizen?".

Lawyer Flávia Penido, outraged by the court's decision, launched a fundraising campaign to raise the five thousand reais fine owed by Tamburini to Correa due to the conviction. Penido advocates for society's support for the traffic agent and stated that she considers it a "barbarity for a judge to consider himself with all these powers. It is an important pressure. The judge cannot judge based on societal pressure, but society must show that it is attentive to what they are judging. I believe that this is more important than the money." Dubbed the "divine fundraising," it raised over three thousand reais in the first six hours of operation, and reached the goal of five thousand reais approximately nine hours after its launch. According to Tamburini, the excess amount raised will be donated to a charitable institution.

The National Judicial Council (CNJ), an entity linked to the Brazilian National Council of Justice, decided on October 14, 2014, to review the disciplinary process initiated by the Rio de Janeiro Court of Justice to evaluate Correa's conduct, considering the motion for redress as unfounded. The CNJ's internal affairs department is also reviewing the judge's conduct during his tenure in Búzios. The investigation by the CNJ cannot alter the court's decision but may result in a warning, reprimand, transfer to another jurisdiction, or compulsory retirement. According to an editorial by Folha de S. Paulo, the decision of the National Council of Justice contrasts two models of social organization: "One, archaic, in which the application of laws varies according to the status of those entangled in them; and another, in which every citizen is treated equally in their rights and obligations by the State."

On November 13, 2014, the Full Council of the Rio de Janeiro Bar Association (OAB/RJ) announced that it would request Correa's suspension until all accusations were investigated. Felipe Santa Cruz, president of OAB/RJ, commented, "He needs to request a leave of absence to find out if he is fit to remain in the judiciary. His conduct is venomous to other judges, and the complaints keep increasing," stating that the "Rio de Janeiro Court of Justice needs to respond to these complaints. If the Court acts with corporatism, it will transfer this negative image to other judges."

In March 2015, the CNJ decided to review the process that acquitted the judge. In a statement, CNJ counselor Guilherme Calmon stated that "The discrepancies between the votes are such that they lead, at the very least, to a reasonable doubt capable of justifying disciplinary review by this body." Councilor Nancy Andrighi, the national ombudsman for justice, explained in her vote that the testimonies are contradictory regarding the behavior of the agent and the judge. However, according to the CNJ, there is no doubt that Correa arrested Luciana and drove his own car to the police station.
