= Millôr Fernandes =

Brazilian writer (1923–2012)

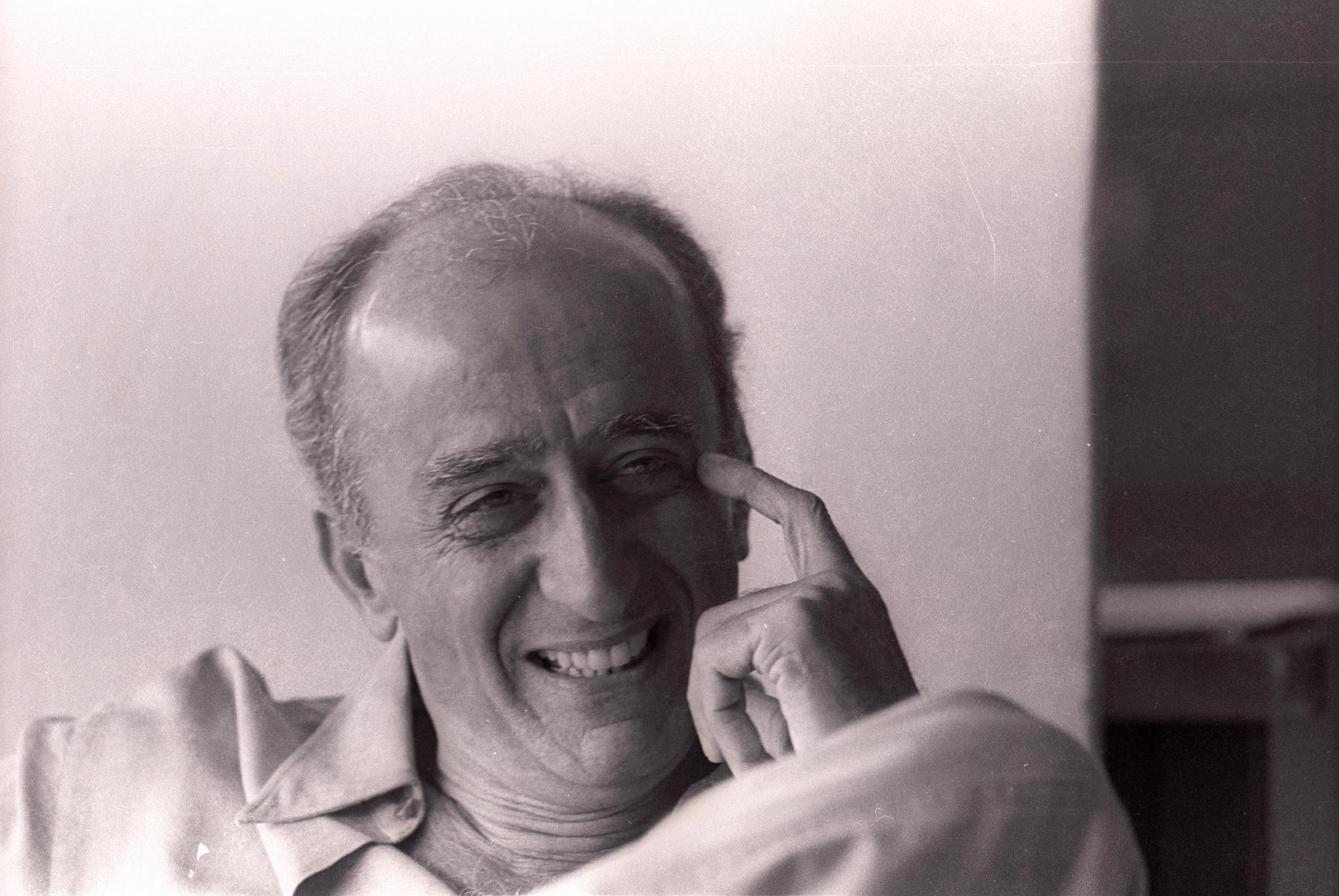
- Born: August 16, 1923; Rio de Janeiro, Brazil
- Died: March 27, 2012 (aged 88); Rio de Janeiro
- Writing career
- Genre: Humor

Millôr Fernandes (August 16, 1923 – March 27, 2012) was a Brazilian writer, journalist, cartoonist, humorist and playwright. Born Milton Viola Fernandes, his birth was registered on May 27, 1924; the handwriting on his birth certificate rendered the name "Millôr", which he adopted as his official name.

He was born in Rio de Janeiro, and started his journalistic career in 1938, publishing in several Brazilian magazines, such as O Cruzeiro and A Cigarra Millor was known by his ironic humor, and was the author of thousands of satirical aphorisms.

In 1956, Millôr shared with Saul Steinberg the first prize at the Buenos Aires International Caricature Exhibition, and in 1957 he had a one-man exhibition in Rio de Janeiro's Museum of Modern Art.

Together with Jaguar, Ziraldo and others, he founded in 1969 the groundbreaking satirical newspaper O Pasquim.

Millôr wrote a number of successful plays, and has also translated classics such as Shakespeare.

He died on March 27, 2012, in Rio de Janeiro, due to complications after a stroke. He was 88 years old.

== Works ==
=== Books ===
==== Prose ====
- 1946 – Eva sem costela – Um livro em defesa do homem (Editora O Cruzeiro. Under the pseudonym Adão Júnior)
- 1949 – Tempo e contratempo (Editora O Cruzeiro. Under the pseudonym Emmanuel Vão Gogo)
- 1963 – Lições de um ignorante (J. Álvaro Editor)
- 1964 – Fábulas Fabulosas (J. Álvaro Editor. Revised edition released in 1973 by Nórdica)
- 1972 – Esta é a verdadeira história do Paraíso (Livraria Francisco Alves)
- 1972 – Trinta anos de mim mesmo (Nórdica)
- 1973 – Livro vermelho dos pensamentos de Millôr (Nórdica. Revised edition released by Senac in 2000)
- 1975 – Compozissõis imfãtis (Nórdica)
- 1975 – Livro branco do humor (Nórdica)
- 1976 – Devora-me ou te decifro (L&PM)
- 1977 – Millôr no Pasquim (Nórdica)
- 1977 – Reflexões sem dor (Edibolso)
- 1978 – Novas fábulas fabulosas (Nórdica)
- 1978 – Que país é este? (Nórdica)
- 1980 – Millôr Fernandes – Literatura comentada (Abril Educação. Organized by Maria Célia Paulillo)
- 1981 – Todo homem é minha caça (Nórdica)
- 1985 – Diário da Nova República (L&PM)
- 1987 – Eros uma vez (Nórdica. Ilustrações de Nani)
- 1988 – Diário da Nova República, v. 2 (L&PM)
- 1988 – Diário da Nova República, v. 3 (L&PM)
- 1988 – The cow went to the swamp ou A vaca foi pro brejo (Record)
- 1992 – Humor Nos Tempos do Collor (L&PM. With Luis Fernando Veríssimo and Jô Soares)
- 1994 – Millôr definitivo - A bíblia do caos (L&PM)
- 1977 – Amostra bem-humorada (Ediouro. Texts selected by Maura Sardinha)
- 1998 – Tempo e contratempo (Beca. 2ª edição)
- 2002 – Crítica da razão impura ou O primado da ignorância (L&PM)
- 2003 – 100 Fábulas Fabulosas (Record)
- 2004 – Apresentações (Record)
- 2007 – Novas Fábulas e Contos Fabulosos (Desiderata. Illustrated by Angeli)
- 2007 – Circo das Palavras (Ática)
- 2010 – O Mundo Visto Daqui (Praça General Osório) (Desiderata)
- 2011 – A Entrevista (L&PM)
- 2014 – 100+100: Desenhos e Frases (Instituto Moreira Salles)
- 2014 – Guia Millôr da História do Brasil (Nova Fronteira)
- 2016 – Guia Millôr da Filosofia (Nova Fronteira)
- 2016 – Millôr: Obra Gráfica (Instituto Moreira Salles)

==== Poesia ====
- 1967 – Papaverum Millôr (Prelo. Edição revista e ilustrada publicada pela Nordica em 1974)
- 1968 – Hai-kais (Senzala)
- 1984 – Poemas (L&PM)

==== Visual arts ====
- 1981 – Desenhos (Raízes Artes Gráficas. Preface by Pietro Maria Bardi and introduction by Antônio Houaiss)

=== Stage plays ===
==== Plays published in book ====
- 1957 – Teatro de Millôr Fernandes (Civilização Brasileira. Includes Uma mulher em três atos, 1953, Do tamanho de um defunto and Bonito como um deus, 1955, and A gaivota,1959)
- 1962 – Um elefante no caos ou Jornal do Brasil ou, sobretudo, Por que me ufano do meu país (Editora do Autor)
- 1965 – Pigmaleoa (Brasiliense)
- 1972 – Computa, computador, computa (Nórdica)
- 1977 – É... (L&PM)
- 1978 – A história é uma istória (L&PM)
- 1982 – O homem do princípio ao fim (L&PM)
- 1979 – Os órfãos de Jânio (L&PM)
- 1982 – Duas tábuas e uma paixão (L&PM. Never staged)

==== Plays not edited ====
- 1955 – Diálogo da mais perfeita compreensão conjugal
- 1962 – Pif, tac, zig, pong
- 1967 – A viúva imortal
- 1982 – A eterna luta entre o homem e a mulher
- 1995 – Kaos (public reading in 2001. Never staged)
