= Cabine C =

Brazilian gothic rock band

- Origin: São Paulo, Brazil
- Genres: Dark wave; gothic rock
- Years active: 1984–1987
- Label: RPM Discos
- Past members: Ciro Pessoa; Anna Ruth dos Santos; Wania Forghieri; Marinella Setti; Edgard Scandurra; Charles Gavin; Sandra Coutinho; Ricardo Gaspa

Cabine C (Portuguese pronunciation: [kaˈbini ˈse], Portuguese for "Cabin C") was a short-lived Brazilian rock band from São Paulo. With their sonority inspired by acts such as Siouxsie and the Banshees, the Cure, Cocteau Twins and Talking Heads, and vocalist Ciro Pessoa's lyrics influenced by Romantic and Symbolist poets such as Edgar Allan Poe, Charles Baudelaire and Arthur Rimbaud, and by playwright Antonin Artaud, they are considered to be one of the first and most famous Brazilian gothic rock bands (even though Pessoa publicly rejected any associations with the goth subculture at the time), as well as forerunners of the cold wave movement in Brazil.

Despite their short lifespan, they have a strong cult following to the present day.

== History ==
Cabine C was formed in 1984 by Ciro Pessoa, who had parted ways with his previous band, Titãs, the year prior. Its initial line-up comprised Pessoa on vocals, his then-wife Wania Forghieri on keyboards, Edgard Scandurra of Ira! on guitar, Charles Gavin (who had just joined Titãs) on drums and Sandra Coutinho of Mercenárias on bass (Sandra later left the band and was replaced by Ricardo Gaspa, also from Ira!). They recorded some songs with this line-up, and performed some shows in bars and clubhouses of São Paulo, but with the exception of Pessoa and Forghieri, everybody would leave the band afterwards, in order to focus on their respective alternate projects.

In 1986, former Akira S. e as Garotas que Erraram members Anna Ruth dos Santos and Marinella Setti joined Cabine C, and with this line-up they would release in the same year their first (and only) studio album, Fósforos de Oxford, through RPM Discos, so called because it was founded by RPM members Paulo Ricardo and Luiz Schiavon. The album, which counted with guest appearances by Fernando Deluqui and Akira Tsukimoto (the titular "Akira S." of Akira S. e as Garotas que Erraram), was well-received, but suffered from bad promotion, resulting that most people didn't even know it existed, and so it was a commercial failure. Because of that, a lengthy judicial battle between Cabine C and RPM Discos ensued then, resulting in the end of both Cabine C and RPM Discos in 1987.

Prior to their disbanding, Cabine C was working on a second studio album, which would be called Cotonetes Desconexos; however, the project did not come to fruition.

Their song "Tão Perto" ("So Close") is present in the compilation of Brazilian underground post-punk music The Sexual Life of the Savages, released in 2005 by British label Soul Jazz Records. In 2017, Pessoa wrote a song in tribute to Cabine C entitled "Cabine C/Na Primavera", for the self-titled debut album of his latest project Flying Chair. He died on May 5, 2020, following complications from a cancer and COVID-19.

== Members ==
- Ciro Pessoa – vocals (1984–1987), electric guitar (1986–1987) (died 2020)
- Wania Forghieri – keyboards (1984–1987)
- Anna Ruth dos Santos – bass, backing vocals (1986–1987)
- Marinella Setti – drums (1986–1987)
- Edgard Scandurra – electric guitar (1984–1986)
- Charles Gavin – drums (1984–1986)
- Sandra Coutinho – bass (1984–1985)
- Ricardo Gaspa – bass (1986)

== Discography ==
=== Studio albums ===
Year	Album
1986	Fósforos de Oxford: Label: RPM Discos; Format: Vinyl

=== Compilations ===
Year	Album
2005	The Sexual Life of the Savages: Label: Soul Jazz Records; Format: CD, vinyl; Contributed with the song "Tão Perto"

=== Unreleased songs ===
- "Cotonetes Desconexos"
- "Recado Chinês"
- "Nossas Cabeças São Nossos Erros"
- "Inundação de Amor" (written by Ciro Pessoa and Júlio Barroso of Gang 90 e as Absurdettes, it would later be performed by Ira!)
- "A História do Meu Delírio"
- "O Lado Bom da Bomba" (written by Ciro Pessoa and Branco Mello)
