= Jaguar (cartoonist) =

Brazilian cartoonist (1932–2025)

- Born: Sérgio de Magalhães Gomes Jaguaribe; 29 February 1932 Rio de Janeiro, Brazil
- Died: 24 August 2025 (aged 93) Rio de Janeiro
- Area: Cartoonist
- Notable works: O Pasquim; Chopiniks
- Awards: Prêmio Angelo Agostini for Master of National Comics

Sérgio de Magalhães Gomes Jaguaribe (February 29, 1932 – August 24, 2025), known by the pseudonym Jaguar, was a Brazilian cartoonist and comics artist. He achieved notoriety as one of the founders of the satirical newspaper O Pasquim in 1969, which became a symbol of opposition to the military dictatorship in Brazil. Jaguar is famous for creating the character Sig, the newspaper's mascot mouse, and for his humorous and ironic style that circumvented censorship, inspiring other journalists and cartoonists.

== Life and career ==
=== Early career ===
Originally a Banco do Brasil clerk, Jaguar started sketching on a professional basis in 1952, when he offered the weekly magazine Manchete some cartoons loosely inspired by the work of the French-Hungarian cartoonist André François. After working for Manchete and the culture monthly Senhor, he became famous in the 1960s for his works, among whose highlights were his illustrations to the collections of satirical chronicles by Sergio Porto entitled FEBEAPÁ (acronym for "The Festival of Stupidities that plagues our country" - the chronicles dealt mostly with the petty ridicules of the Military Dictatorship in Brazil), as well as his cartoon anthology "Átila, você é bárbaro" ("Attila, you're barbarous!"). In 1969 -together with his fellow cartoonists Millôr Fernandes, Ziraldo and other journalistic celebrities, he founded the groundbreaking satirical newspaper O Pasquim.

=== Critical acclaim ===
One of his most popular creations at the time was the comic strip Chopiniks (from "chope", a Brazilian vernacular for draft beer), which was sketched by Jaguar on scripts written by Ivan Lessa. Originally designed as a means to advertise a new brand of beer, the strip was a satirical portrayal of the bohemian 1960s Rio de Janeiro intelligentsia that gathered around the neighbourhood of Ipanema, its chief characters being the bohemians Robespierre (from Maximilien Robespierre: the character was created after a friend of Jaguar's actually named Marat, after the French revolutionary) and "BD" (named after another friend of Jaguar's, the bohemian Hugo Bidet), who had as their sidekick BD's pet Sig (from "Sigmund"), a neurotic, debauched mouse (in the stories he's called a rat), who had as his real life model Bidet's pet white mouse (who died after being treated to a diet of bread crumbs drenched in vodka), but was at the same time conceived as a satirical answer to Mickey Mouse. Sig was in charge of most of the story's comic vignettes, many of whom were actual bon mots who had found their way into Jaguar's strip. Such is the case with the famous tag: "Intellectuals don't go to the beach. Intellectuals booze" (Intelectual não vai à praia. Intelectual bebe) - a phrase attributed by Jaguar to the journalist Paulo Francis - which is reproduced in one of the strips as being spoken by BD .

In a late interview, Jaguar defined himself as a cartoonist, in the Brazilian vernacular sense of a cartum maker - cartum meaning a graphic joke based on stock models and situations, as opposed, in Jaguar's view, to caricature, which is concerned with offering satirical commentary on an actual situation. In the portrayal of a particular milieu - that of bohemian 1960s Rio - he actually excelled, if only to be superseded by the demise of the same milieu.

=== Pasquim foreclosure ===
Jaguar was the last of the original Pasquim founders that continued editing the paper through the 1980s, when the weekly had lost almost all of its customers and influence. Jaguar had to bank on the financial support of the Rio de Janeiro governor Leonel Brizola.

When even that was not enough, Jaguar closed down the paper in 1991, something that left him personally bankrupt and saddened. During the 1990s, he worked as an editor at the tabloid daily A Notícia. In a 2001 interview, he said that "if I were a type who cared, I would have myself killed long ago".

== Death ==
Jaguar died in Rio de Janeiro on 24 August 2025, at the age of 93.
