= Miá Mello =

Brazilian actress and comedian (born 1981)

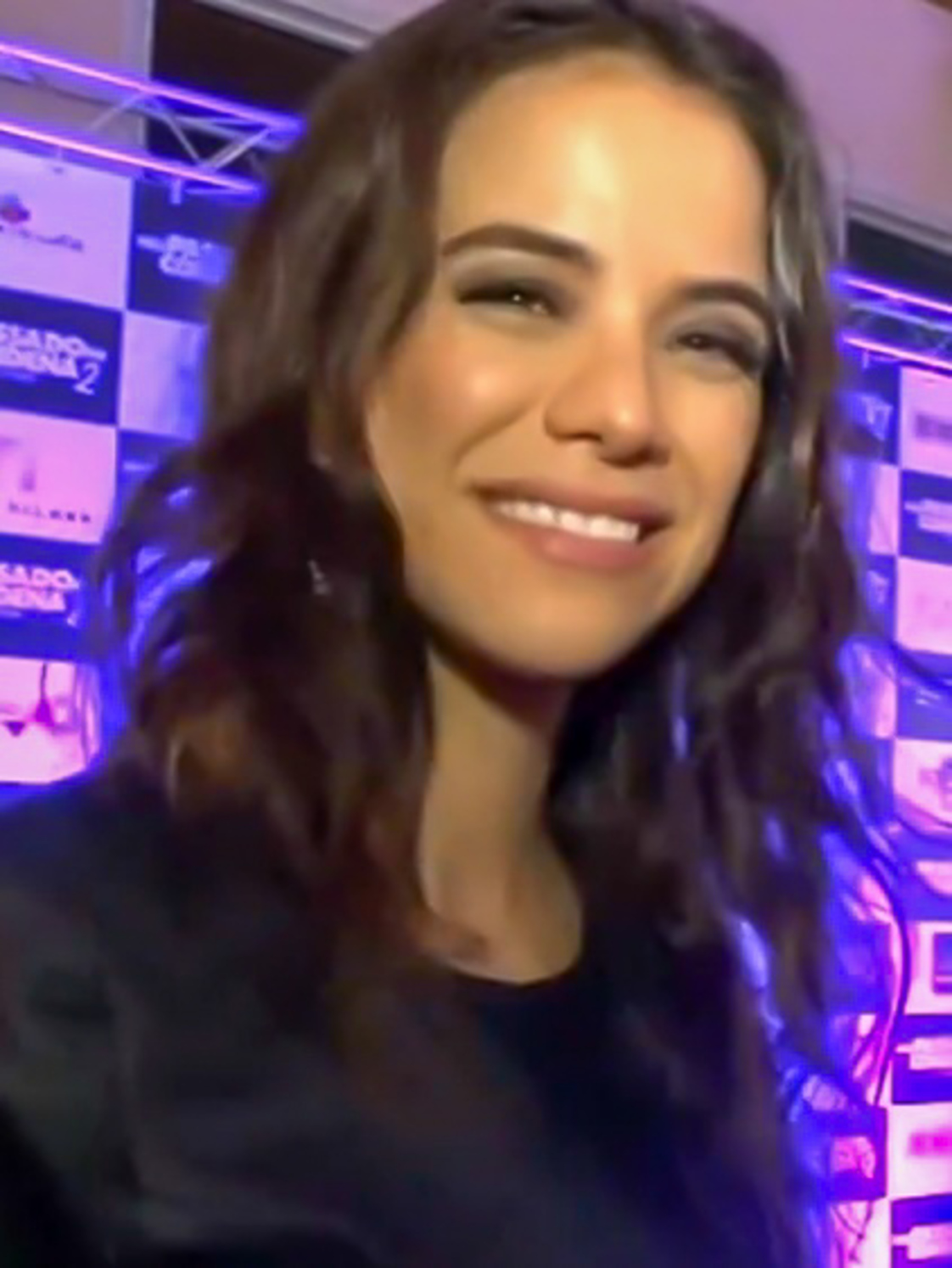
- Mello in 2015
- Born: 26 February 1981 (age 45); São Paulo, Brazil
- Occupations: Actress, comedian
- Years active: 2008–present
- Notable work: Meu Passado Me Condena; Meu Passado Me Condena 2

Miá Mello, artistic name of Marília Penariol Melo (born February 26, 1981), is a Brazilian actress and comedian.

== Filmography ==
=== Television ===
Year	Title	Role	Notes
2010–2011	Legendários	Reporter (Teena/Miá)	
2011	Viajandona	Presenter	
2012	Casseta & Planeta Vai Fundo	Mona Lesa	
2012–2014	Meu Passado Me Condena	Miá Meirelles	
2013	Cê Faz O Quê?	Various	
2013	The Voice Brasil	Reporter	
2013	Tapas & Beijos	Alessandra	Episode: "A Noiva do Ano"
2013	TV Xuxa	Herself (Judge)	
2014	Por Isso Eu Sou Vingativa	Carla	
2015	Acredita na Peruca	Stephanie	
2015	SuperChef Celebridades	Contestant	4th place, Season 4
2018	Amigo de Aluguel	Mônica	Episode: "O Parto"
2019–2020	Homens?	Mariane "Mari"	
2021	Posso Explicar	Presenter	
2022–2023	All the Same... or Not	Beth	
2022	O Que Você Não Sabia Sobre o Humor	Presenter	Episodes: "O que é Humor" "Humor e Limites"
2023–present	90 Dias na Cama	Presenter	
2024	Luz	Kelly Thompson	
2024	O Som e a Sílaba	Deborah	
2024	Dream Productions	Joy (voice)	Brazilian dubbing

=== Cinema ===
Year	Title	Role	Notes
2011	Cilada.com	One of Bruno's ex-girlfriends	
2013	Meu Passado Me Condena	Miá	
2013	Meu Passado Me Condena 2	Miá	
2016	Amor em Sampa		
2016	Carrossel 2: O Sumiço de Maria Joaquina	Didi Mell	
2016	Uma Loucura de Mulher	Dulce	

=== Musical ===
Band	Note	Genre
Squat (group)	Vocalist	Hip-Hop

== Stage ==
Year	Title	Role
2008–2009	Desnecessários	Various
2014–2017	Meu Passado Me Condena	Miá Meirelles
