= Viagem e Turismo =

Brazilian tourism website and magazine

- Categories: Travel
- Frequency: Monthly
- Format: magazine website
- Circulation: 123,000 copies
- Publisher: Editora Abril
- Founded: November 1995
- Final issue: August 6, 2018; 8 years ago
- Company: Grupo Abril
- Country: Brazil
- Based in: São Paulo, São Paulo
- Language: Portuguese
- Website: viagemeturismo.abril.com.br

Viagem e Turismo is a Brazilian travel news website published by Editora Abril.

Launched in November 1995, it was the first Brazilian publication dedicated exclusively to tourism. It has a circulation of 123,000 copies. Due to a crisis that has hit the Abril publishing group and the magazine market in Brazil, on August 6, 2018, it was announced that the magazine would be discontinued, along with nine other titles. However, Grupo Abril continues to maintain the website under the brand name.
