= Sérgio Porto =

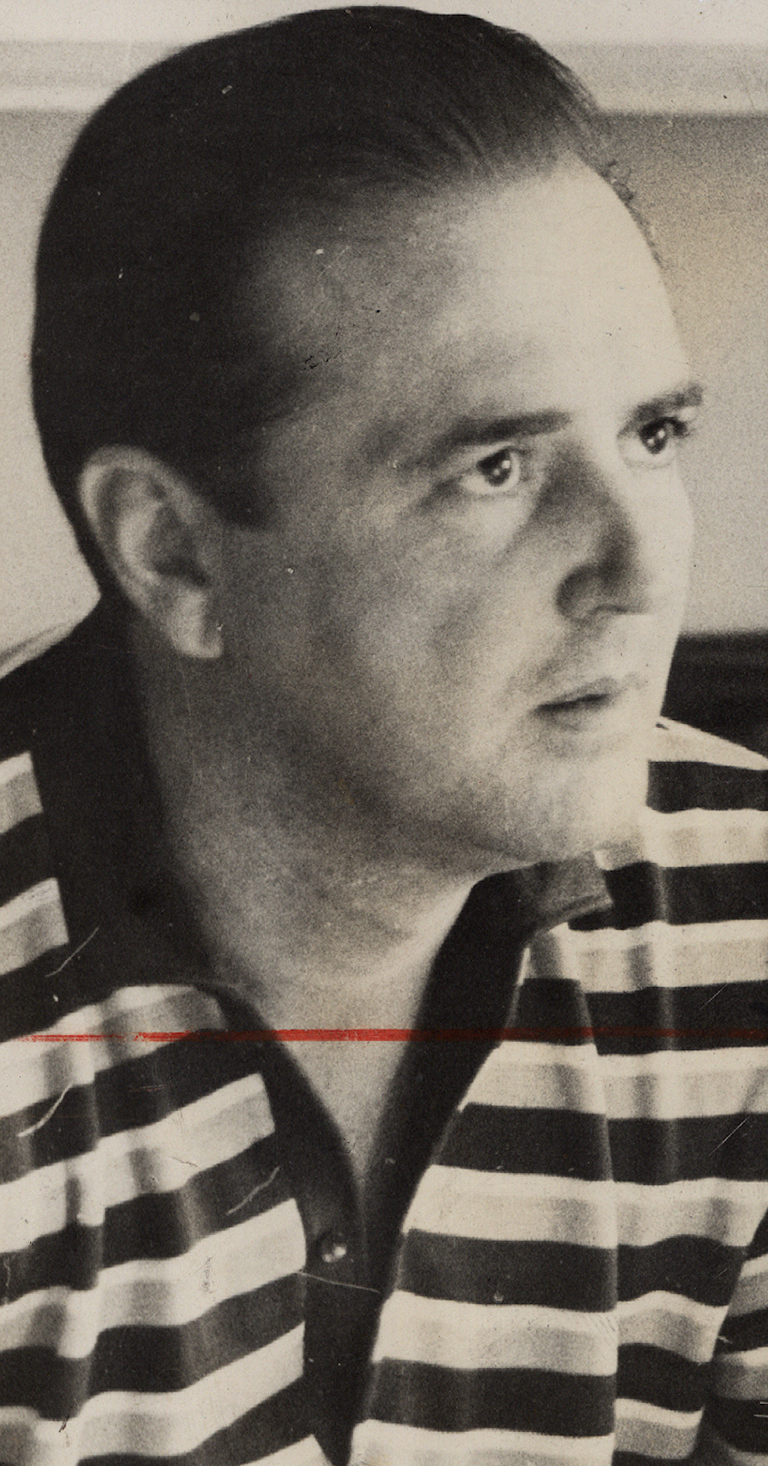
Sérgio Rangel Porto in 1966

Sérgio Marcus Rangel Porto (January 11, 1923 – September 30, 1968) was a Brazilian columnist, writer, broadcaster and composer. He was better known by his pen name Stanislaw Ponte Preta.

Porto was born in Rio de Janeiro, and began his journalistic career in the late 1940s, writing for such publications as Sombra and Manchete magazines and the newspapers Última Hora, Tribuna da Imprensa and Diário Carioca. In the same period Tomás Santa Rosa also acted in several newspapers and newsletters as an illustrator. It was then that the character Stanislaw Ponte Preta and his satirical and critical chronicles was born, a creation of Porto along with Santa Rosa - the character's first illustrator - inspired by the character Serafim Ponte Grande by Oswald de Andrade. Porto has also contributed to music publications and wrote musical shows for nightclubs, as well as composing the song "Samba do Crioulo Doido" for revue theater.

He was also the creator and producer of the beauty pageant As Certinhas do Lalau, which featured vedettes such as Anilza Leoni, Diana Morel, Rose Rondelli, Maria Pompeo, and Irma Alvarez, and of the FEBEAPÁ - Festival de Besteira que Assola o País (Festival of Nonsense that Sweeps the Country), a news satire column where he made corrosive jokes against the military dictatorship, and the social moralism of his time. Porto died in 1968, before the dictatorship's Institutional Act n°5, that established censorship in the Brazilian press.

== Published works ==
As Stanislaw Ponte Preta

- Tia Zulmira e Eu (1961)
- Primo Altamirando e Elas (1962)
- Rosamundo e os Outros (1963)
- Garoto Linha Dura (1964)
- FEBEAPÁ1 (Primeiro Festival de Besteira que Assola o País) (1966)
- FEBEAPÁ2 (Segundo Festival de Besteira que Assola o Pais) (1967)
- Na Terra do Crioulo Doido (1968)
- FEBEAPÁ3 (1968)
- A Máquina de Fazer Doido (1968)
- Gol de Padre

As Sérgio Porto

- A Casa Demolida (1963)
- As Cariocas (1967)
- A Velhinha Contrabandista (1967)
