= Antonio Tabet =

Antonio Pedro Tabet (Rio de Janeiro, June 26, 1974) is an advertising, scriptwriter and Brazilian comedian. Tabet is one of the creators of the channel Porta dos Fundos, and is the creator of the now defunct website Kibe Loco. He was vice president of communication at Clube de Regatas do Flamengo between 2015 and 2017. Currently, he is among the stars of Borges Importadora.
