= Fábio Porchat =

Brazilian comedian (born 1983)

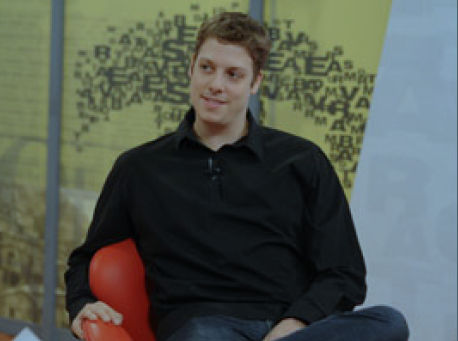
- Born: Fábio Porchat de Assis; July 1, 1983 (age 43); Rio de Janeiro, Brazil
- Notable work: Porta dos Fundos; Meu Passado Me Condena; Vai que Dá Certo

Comedy career
- Years active: 2005–present
- Website: fabioporchat.com.br

Fábio Porchat (born July 1, 1983) is a Brazilian actor, humorist, comedian, television host and writer.

== Biography ==
Winner of the International Emmy in 2019, for the Comedy Special “Porta dos Fundos Christmas Special (The Last Hangover)” produced by Porta dos Fundos for Netflix, Fábio Porchat was born in Rio de Janeiro. He is the son of politician, screenwriter and businessman Fabio Ferrari Porchat de Assis and Isabella Thereza Christina Robinson. When he was still a baby, he moved with his family to São Paulo, where he lived until he was 19 years old. He declares himself an atheist.

== Career ==
Before entering the world of the arts, Porchat studied Administration at ESPM in São Paulo, but decided to put studies in the background to focus on acting career. He moved to Rio de Janeiro and enrolled in the drama course at CAL – Casa de Artes das Laranjeiras. His TV career started when he went to the "Programa do Jô" in 2002, to present a parody of the sitcom "Os Normais" and then was invited for auditions for TV Globo.

In 2005, alongside the comedian Paulo Gustavo, Porchat took the stage first with a piece of his own, "Infraturas". The following year, the actor was recognized for participating in the first group of stand up comedy from Brazil, "Comédia em Pé". Porchat was in the show until 2011 and soon spawned another hit with the solo show "Fora do Normal".

Porchat's career took off with the comedy group Porta dos Fundos' YouTube videos in 2012, alongside João Vicente de Castro, Antonio Pedro Tabet, Gregório Duvivier and Ian SBF, where he participates in the creative team, screenplay and acting. In little more than six months of the project, the channel had reached the milestone of garnering 30 million views.

== Filmography ==
=== Film ===
Year	Title	Role	Notes
2009	Podia Ser Pior	Rodrigo	
2011	Teste de Elenco	Fábio	
2012	Totalmente Inocentes	Do Morro	
2012	Vai que Dá Certo	Amaral	Also co-writer
2013	O Concurso	Rogério Carlos	
2013	Meu Passado Me Condena	Fábio	
2013	Frozen	Olaf	Voice, Brazilian Version
2015	Frozen Fever	Olaf	Voice, Brazilian Version
2015	Entre Abelhas	Bruno	Also co-writer
2015	Meu Passado Me Condena 2	Fábio	
2016	Vai que Dá Certo 2	Amaral	
2016	Contrato Vitalício	Rodrigo	Also co-writer
2016	The Angry Birds Movie	Chuck	Voice, Brazilian Version
2016	Sausage Party	Twink	Voice, Brazilian Version
2017	Olaf's Frozen Adventure	Olaf	Voice, Brazilian Version
2018	The Last Hangover	Jesus	
2019	Frozen 2	Olaf	Voice, Brazilian Version
2022	Mallus	Diego	
2022	O Palestrante	Guilherme	
2022	O Espírito do Natal	Juliano	

=== Internet productions ===
Year	Title	Role	Notes
2012 – present	Porta dos Fundos		
2014	Viral		
