= Porta dos Fundos =

Brazilian comedy YouTube channel

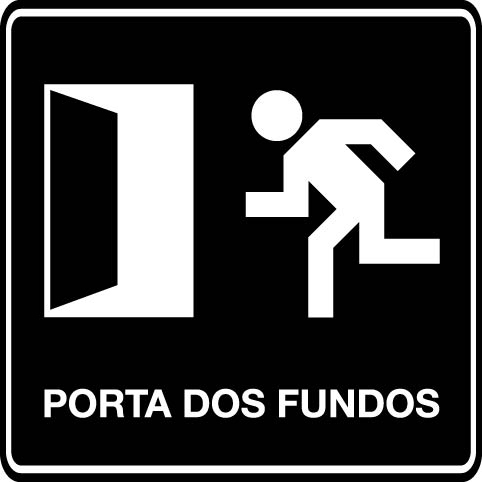
- Logo of the YouTube channel of Porta dos Fundos

YouTube information
- Channel: portadosfundos
- Years active: 6 August 2012–present
- Genre: Comedy
- Website: www.portadosfundos.com.br

Porta dos Fundos (literally "Back Door") is a Brazilian comedy production company and YouTube channel. It was established in 2012 by Fábio Porchat, Antonio Pedro Tabet, Gregório Duvivier, João Vicente de Castro and Ian SBF in Rio de Janeiro. Its videos often feature closed captions in English.

== Overview ==
Porta dos Fundos releases sketches depicting social situations in a satirically exaggerated manner. The parodies have been made on numerous themes, including religion, drug use, relationships, sexuality (as in its series Viral), political corruption and everyday frustrations. There are also parodies of history and fiction.

The channel has sparked some controversy; Porchat said it occupied a blank space "that Brazilian television's conservative nature and obsession with [viewing] figures have missed."

The group refused several offers to bring it to television because "freedom is essential for us," stated Porchat. In 2014, however, Porta dos Fundos signed to Fox Network Brazil; the show premiered on Fox on 14 October 2014, and only exhibits sketches that are already on their YouTube channel. A theater film titled Contrato Vitalício was released in Brazil on 30 June 2016.

First Brazilian YouTube channel to have 10 million subscribers, Porta dos Fundos made cameo appearances in YouTube Rewind 2013 and 2015.

In April 2017, American media conglomerate Viacom (later called Paramount Global) acquired a majority in Porta dos Fundos through its international television channels division, which had previously co-produced Portátil with it. This allowed Viacom to have its own Brazilian production company and YouTube channel, as well as the right to collaborate on new co-productions with them.

In March 2025, however, Paramount International Networks sold the assets acquired eight years earlier back to the co-founders Porchat, Duvivier and Castro; which the trio continued operating the production company with co-founder Tabet and Ian SBF stepping down of Porta dos Fundos.

== Crew ==
=== Cast ===
- Antonio Pedro Tabet
- Fábio Porchat
- Gregório Duvivier
- João Vicente de Castro
- Luis Lobianco
- Gabriel Totoro
- Thati Lopes
- Rafael Portugal
- Karina Ramil
- Evelyn Castro
- Pedro Benevides
- Camillo Borges
- Macla Tenório

==== Former ====
- Marcos Veras (2012–14)
- Marcus Majella (2012–14)
- Letícia Lima (2012–15)
- Clarice Falcão (2012–15)
- Júlia Rabello (2012–15)
- Rafael Infante (2012–16)

=== Staff ===
- Ian SBF – screenwriter, director
- Rodrigo Magal – editor, director
- Gregório Duvivier – screenwriter
- Fábio Porchat – screenwriter
- Antonio Pedro Tabet – screenwriter
- Gabriel Esteves – screenwriter
- Luanne Araujo – editor
- Rodrigo Brazao – editor
- Gustavo Chagas – making of director
- Alice Ventura – assistant director
- Gui Machado – cinematography
- Nataly Mega – production director
- Bianca Caetano – producer
- Ohana Boy – producer
- Lívia Andrade - producer
- Bruno Menezes – audio
- João Marcos – social media
- Juli Videla – costume designer
- Luciano Iulianelli – financial analyst
- Amanda Moura – commercial director
- Marcela Briones – commercial analyst
- Arthur Santiago – graphic designer

== Filmography ==
=== Films ===
Year	Title	Notes
2016	Contrato Vitalício	Theater movie
2018	The Last Hangover	Netflix special
2019	The First Temptation of Christ	Netflix special
2021	Peçanha Contra os Animais	Amazon Exclusive
2021	Te Prego Lá Fora	Paramount+ animated special

=== Series ===
Year	Title	Network
Web
2014	Viral	YouTube
2014	Refém	YouTube
TV
2015	O Grande Gonzalez	Fox Channel Brazil
2017	Greg News	HBO Brasil
2018	Borges	Comedy Central Brazil
2019	Homens?	Comedy Central Brazil
2019	Virada de Mesa	DAZN
2021	Futuro Ex-Porta	YouTube Originals
2022	The Followers	Paramount+

== Attack on headquarters ==
On December 26, 2019, it was reported that the headquarters of Porta dos Fundos, which is located in Rio de Janeiro, suffered from a Molotov cocktail bombing. A Brazilian Integralist religious group which dubbed themselves the "Popular Nationalist Insurgency Command of the Large Brazilian Integralist Family" claimed responsibility for the attack, even filming themselves attacking offices while wearing ski masks. The group, which attacked the headquarters on December 24, 2019, also criticized Netflix and labeled The First Temptation of Christ as blasphemous. One of the attackers was identified as Eduardo Fauzi Cerquise, who later took a flight to Russia and was put on the Interpol wanted list.
