= Gregorio Duvivier =

Brazilian actor, comedian and poet

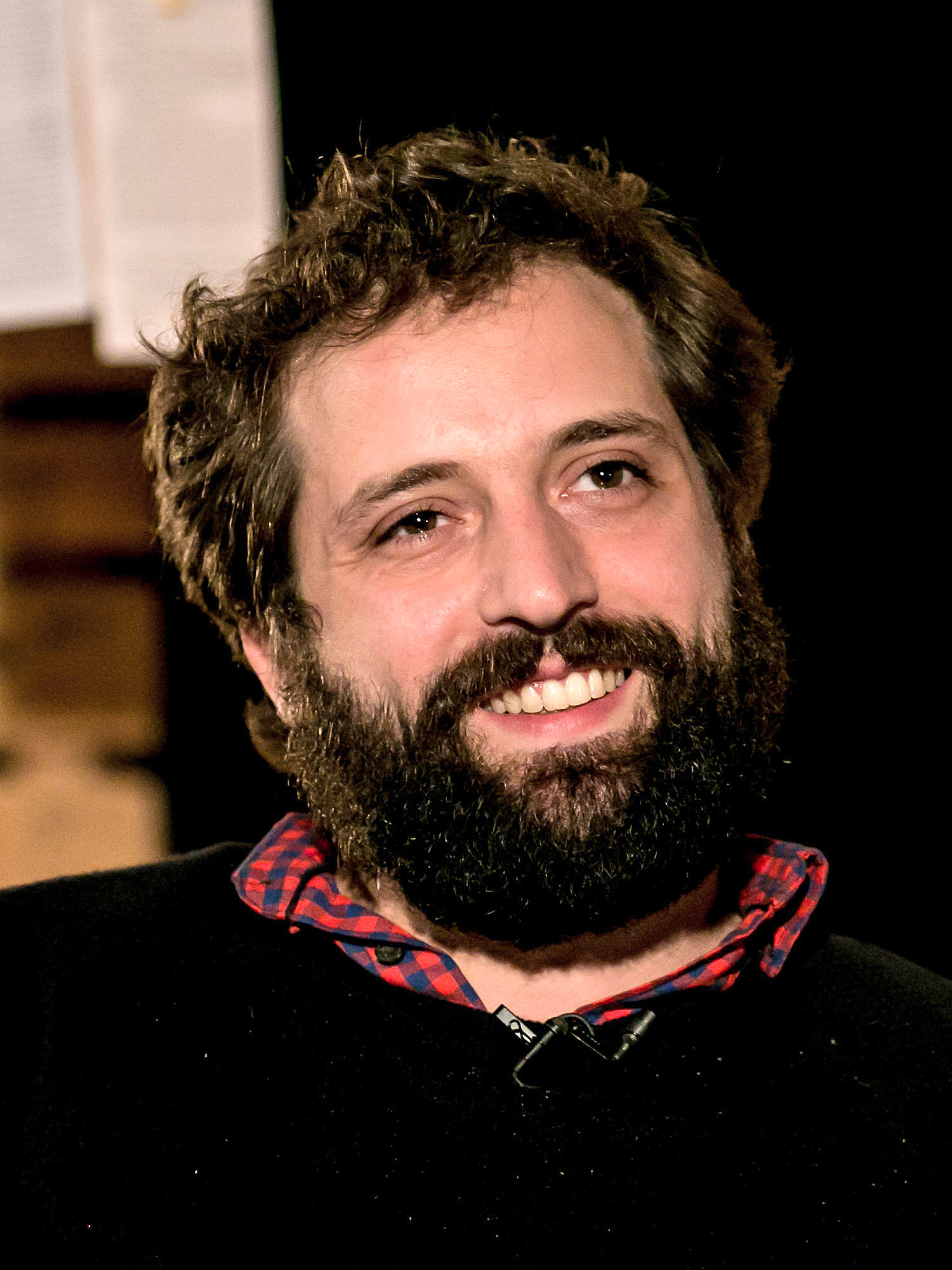
- Duvivier in 2016
- Born: Gregorio Byington Duvivier; 11 April 1986 (age 40); Rio de Janeiro, Brazil
- Occupations: Actor, comedian and poet
- Spouses: Clarice Falcão (m. 2014; div. 2014) Giovanna Nader (m. 2018)
- Children: 2

Gregorio Byington Duvivier (born 11 April 1986) is a Brazilian actor, comedian and poet. He is known by his works in film and theater, being one of the members of the comedy troupe Porta dos Fundos.

== Biography ==
Duvivier was born in Rio de Janeiro, the son of musician and visual artist Edgar Duvivier and singer Olivia Byington, and his siblings are John, Theodora and Barbara Duvivier. He is also the nephew of actress Bianca Byington. On his paternal side, he descends from the commander Theodore Duvivier, one of the promoters of the urbanization of the neighborhoods of Copacabana and Leme (Rio de Janeiro), in the late nineteenth century. On his maternal side, the philanthropist Pérola Byington was his great-great-grandmother.

At age 9, he studied acting at Tablado school. One year before entering college, Duvivier joined Marcelo Adnet, Fernando Caruso and Rafael Queiroga in the comedy show Z.É.- Zenas Emprovisadas. He graduated in Literature at Pontifícia Universidade Católica do Rio de Janeiro.

After being in a relationship for five years, Duvivier and Clarice Falcão formally married in February 2014. Their marriage ended in November that same year. In 2017, he began dating TV host a and journalist Giovanna Nader. The two married in 2018 and went on to have two daughters.

He has previously identified as an atheist.

In May 2017, he and his troupe started the program Greg News com Gregório Duvivier inspired by HBO's own satirical news magazine Last Week Tonight with John Oliver in collaboration with HBO Latin America.

== Filmography ==
=== As actor ===
Television
Year	Title	Role	Notes
2007	O Sistema	Avenarius	
2007	Mandrake	He-man	"Rosas Negras" (Season 2, Episode 3)
2007; 2008	Cilada	Luiz; Roger	"Barzinho" (Season 4, Episode 1) "Fazenda" (Season 5, Episode 4)
2008 –2010	Mateus, o Balconista	Greg	
2008	Casos e Acasos	Vítor	"A Garota, o Vestibular e os Ingressos" (Season 1, Episode 21)
2009	A Lei e o Crime	M.Simão	
2009; 2012	A Grande Família	Leléo	"A Noite da Jovem Guarda" (Season 9, Episode 19) "Avenida Saraiva" (Season 12, Episode 22)
2009–2010	Os Buchas	Benício (Beni)	
2010	Junto & Misturado	Various characters	
2010	Vendemos Cadeiras	Fábio Jr.	
2012	As Brasileiras	Júlio	"A Vidente de Diamantina" (Season 1, Episode 18)
2012	O Fantástico Mundo de Gregório	Himself	
2013	A Grande Família	Hugo	"O Substituto" (Season 13, Episode 14)
2017	Greg News com Gregório Duvivier	Himself (show host)	Late night talk show on HBO Brasil, modeled after Last Week Tonight with John Oliver.

Film
Year	Title	Character	Notes
2007	Podecrer!	Marquinhos	
2008	O Diário de Tati	Bidú	
2009	Apenas o Fim	Antônio (Tom)	
2009	Alguns Nomes do Impossível	Lázaro	Short film
2009	À Deriva	Lucas	
2009	Vida de Balconista	Greg	
2009	5x Favela - Agora por Nós Mesmos	Eduardo	
2010	A Mulher Invisível	Gerente do cinema	
2010	Podia Ser Pior	Murillo	
2010	Chico Xavier	Oftalmologista	
2011	Não Se Preocupe, Nada Vai Dar Certo	Lalau Velasco	
2011	Qualquer Gato Vira-Lata	Hippie	
2011	O Homem do Futuro	Engravatado 1991	
2011	Heleno	Torcedor	
2012	Reis e Ratos	Nélio	
2013	Fim	Flávio	Short film
2013	Vai que Dá Certo	Vaguinho	Gaguejava
2013	Giovanni Improtta	Adriano Soares	
2014	Penguins of Madagascar	Short Fuse	Voice, Brazilian version
2016	Sausage Party	Barry	Voice, Brazilian version
2018	The Last Hangover	Judas	
2019	The Invisible Life of Eurídice Gusmão	Antenor	

Internet
Year	Character	Title	Note(s)
2010–2012	Various characters	Anões em Chamas	
2012–present	Various characters	Porta dos Fundos	
2024–present	Himself	Calma Urgente	Podcast

=== Technical ===
Television
Year	Title	Function
2010	As Cariocas	Screenwriter
2012	As Brasileiras	Screenwriter
2012–2013	Louco por Elas	Screenwriter
2012	O Fantástico Mundo de Gregório	Screenwriter

== Works ==
- A partir de amanhã eu juro que a vida vai ser agora (2008) (7 Letras) (ISBN 85-8086-863-7)
- Ligue os pontos: Poemas de amor e Big Bang (2013) (Companhia das Letras) (ISBN 85-7577-551-0)
- Put some farofa (2014) (Companhia das Letras) (ISBN 85-438-0209-1)
- Percatempos - Tudo Que Faço Quando Não Sei O Que Fazer (2015)(Companhia das Letras))
