= Global Goal: Unite for Our Future =

Virtual Event

- Created by: Global Citizen; European Commission
- Presented by: Summit: Katie Couric; Mallika Kapur; Morgan Radford; Isha Sesay; Keir Simmons; Concert: Dwayne Johnson
- Original language: English

Production
- Executive producers: Michael Dempsey (The Summit); Hamish Hamilton (The Concert); Michele Anthony; Declan Kelly; Scooter Braun; Adam Leber; Derrick Johnson
- Production location: Virtual
- Production companies: Live Nation Entertainment; The Lede Company; Roc Nation; Done and Dusted; Global Citizen

Original release
- Network: Syndication
- Release: June 27, 2020

Related
- Together at Home

Global Goal: Unite for Our Future was a virtual event held on June 27, 2020. Created by Global Citizen and the European Commission, it consisted of a summit and concert featuring different personalities aimed to highlight the disproportionate impact of the COVID-19 pandemic on marginalized communities.

The event was produced in collaboration with companies such as Live Nation Entertainment, The Lede Company, and Roc Nation, and also by individuals such as Michele Anthony of the Universal Music Group, Declan Kelly of Teneo, Scooter Braun (with his company SB Projects), Adam Leber (on behalf of Maverick), and Derrick Johnson (on behalf of the NAACP).

== Summit ==
The summit, titled Global Goal: Unite for Our Future—The Summit, featured panel discussions and interviews with world leaders, corporations and philanthropists as they announce new commitments to help develop equitable distribution of COVID-19 tests, treatments and vaccines, as well as rebuild communities devastated by the pandemic. It was produced by Michael Dempsey and hosted by journalists Katie Couric, Mallika Kapur, Morgan Radford, Isha Sesay, and Keir Simmons.

=== Participants ===
Name	Occupation
Angela Merkel	Chancellor of Germany
Ursula von der Leyen	President of the European Commission
Boris Johnson	Prime Minister of the United Kingdom
Emmanuel Macron	President of France
Angélique Kidjo	Singer and activist
Brittany Packnett Cunningham	Activist
Daryl Davis	Singer and activist
António Guterres	Secretary-General of the United Nations
Derrick Johnson	President and CEO of the NAACP
Eddie Ndopu	Activist
Erna Solberg	Prime Minister of Norway
Gayle Smith	President and CEO of the ONE Campaign
Justin Verlander	Baseball player
Kate Upton	Actress
Ken Jeong	Actor
Melinda Gates	Philanthropist
Miley Cyrus	Singer
Ngozi Okonjo-Iweala	Economist
Nikolaj Coster-Waldau	Actor
Phumzile Mlambo-Ngcuka	Under-Secretary-General of the United Nations and Executive Director of UN Women
Vinod Gupta	Businessman and philanthropist

== Concert ==
The concert, titled Global Goal: Unite for Our Future—The Concert, was hosted by actor Dwayne Johnson. It was a worldwide music and entertainment special claiming to celebrate the commitments made due to the actions Global Citizens have taken.

=== Performers ===
Artist	Song
Jennifer Hudson	"Where Peaceful Waters Flow"
Miley Cyrus	"Help!"
Lin-Manuel Miranda; Original Broadway cast of Hamilton; Jimmy Fallon & The Roots	"Helpless"
Usher	"I Cry"
Shakira	"Sale el Sol"
Justin Bieber; Quavo	"Intentions"
Coldplay	"Paradise"
J Balvin	"Mi Gente"
Yemi Alade	"Shekere"

==== Additional performers ====
- Chloe x Halle
- Christine and the Queens
- J’Nai Bridges with Gustavo Dudamel, the Los Angeles Philharmonic and Youth Orchestra Los Angeles
- For Love Choir

=== Appearances ===
- Chris Rock
- Hugh Jackman
- Kerry Washington
- Charlize Theron
- Forest Whitaker
- David Beckham
- Salma Hayek
- Billy Porter
- Diane Kruger
- Antoni Porowski
- Ken Jeong
- Naomi Campbell
- Nikolaj Coster-Waldau
- Olivia Colman

== Broadcast ==
The event was broadcast in the United States on NBC, MSNBC, Bloomberg Television, iHeartRadio, SiriusXM, and InsightTV.

=== International broadcasters ===
- Africa: 1Magic, BET International, Bloomberg Television, Canal+ Afrique, Comedy Central, InsightTV, MTV Africa, and MTV Base
- Argentina: Telefe
- Asia: Comedy Central, MTV, and Paramount Channel
- Australia: MTV, Network 10, and Nine Network
- Belgium: MTV and Pickx Live
- Brazil: Multishow, Comedy Central, MTV, MTV Hits, and Paramount Channel
- Canada: CBC, Ici Radio-Canada Télé, CTV, Citytv, Global, MTV, and InsightTV
- Chile: Chilevisión
- Denmark: Paramount Network and VH1
- Europe: Bloomberg Television, InsightTV, and MTV
- Finland: Paramount Network
- France: CStar and MTV
- Germany: Das Erste, InsightTV, MTV Germany, and One
- Hungary: MTV
- India: Star Movies and Star World
- Israel: MTV and MTV Israel
- Indonesia: InsightTV
- Italy: MTV and MTV Music
- Japan: Fuji TV, MTV Japan, and Tokyo Broadcasting System Television
- Latin America: Comedy Central, MTV, MTV Hits, Paramount Channel, VH1, VH1 HD, VH1 MegaHits, Sony Channel, and TNT
- Mexico: Azteca Uno
- Netherlands: MTV
- Poland: MTV Polska
- Portugal: MTV
- Russia: MTV
- Saudi Arabia: InsightTV
- Singapore: Mediacorp Channel 5
- South Africa: SABC 3
- South Korea: InsightTV
- Spain: Barça TV, MTV, and RTVE
- Sweden: Paramount Network
- Switzerland: MTV
- United Arab Emirates: InsightTV
- United Kingdom: MTV Music
- Vietnam: MTV

=== Online streaming ===
The special was also available on several digital platforms worldwide such as Apple Music, Apple TV, Beats 1, Deezer, Facebook, Tidal, Twitch, Twitter, Yahoo!, and YouTube. It was also streamed live on the Facebook pages of Brut, LADbible, and Vogue Paris.

== Production ==
The producers aimed for each musical performance to have a unique setting.

== Impact ==
The special raised $6.9 billion from 41 countries towards a COVID-19 vaccine.
