= Together at Home =

2020 benefit livestream event

- Also known as: One World: Together at Home
- Created by: Global Citizen
- Written by: Global Citizen
- Presented by: Jimmy Fallon; Jimmy Kimmel; Stephen Colbert
- Original language: English

Production
- Executive producers: Audrey Morrissey; Hugh Evans; Lee Rolontz
- Production location: Virtual
- Running time: 120 minutes
- Production company: Global Citizen

Original release
- Network: Syndication
- Release: April 18, 2020

Related
- Global Goal: Unite for Our Future

One World: Together at Home (also known as Together at Home) was a 2020 benefit concert organized by Global Citizen of New York City and curated by singer Lady Gaga in support of the World Health Organization. The special was intended to promote the practice of social distancing while staying together during the COVID-19 pandemic.

On April 18, 2020, a six-hour pre-show was streamed online immediately prior to the television global broadcast. The online portion of the event was hosted through YouTube by actress and presenter Jameela Jamil (first hour), actor Matthew McConaughey (second hour), actress Danai Gurira (third hour), singer Becky G (fourth hour), actress Laverne Cox (fifth hour) and actor Don Cheadle (sixth hour). It featured appearances from numerous celebrities.

== Participants of concert series ==
- Alex Gaskarth
- Alissa White-Gluz
- Amy Lee
- Amy Shark
- Anne-Marie
- Anthony Hamilton
- Camila Cabello
- Carla Morrison
- Caroline Hjelt
- Celeste
- Charlie Puth
- Chris Martin
- Common
- Dermot Kennedy
- Elize Ryd
- G Flip
- Gloria Gaynor
- Guy Sebastian
- Ha*Ash
- H.E.R.
- Jack Johnson
- James Bay
- Jason Mraz
- John Legend
- Jon Batiste
- Joshua Bassett
- Julianne Hough
- Juanes
- Koffee
- Liam Payne
- Lindsey Stirling
- Little Mix
- Meghan Trainor
- Niall Horan
- Nikki Yanofsky
- Noah Cyrus
- Nomfusi
- OneRepublic
- Rod and Ruby Stewart
- Rufus Wainwright
- Simone Simons
- Tarja Turunen
- Vance Joy
- Wesley Schultz
- Within Temptation
- Years & Years
- Ziggy Marley

== Television special ==
The television special, titled One World: Together at Home, was curated in collaboration between Global Citizen and singer-songwriter Lady Gaga, which benefited the World Health Organization's COVID-19 Solidarity Response Fund. Jimmy Fallon, Jimmy Kimmel, and Stephen Colbert hosted the show, which was a syndicated broadcast that aired on April 18, 2020. The special was also simulcast on select U.S. cable television networks, streaming platforms, and international broadcast networks. In the UK, the show was hosted by Clara Amfo, Dermot O'Leary and Claudia Winkleman and was broadcast on BBC One. The special was broadcast on CBS, ABC, NBC, The CW and other global networks and platforms.

=== During the six-hour online pre-show ===
==== Musical performances (in order of appearance) ====
Prior to the event, Alanis Morissette was announced to appear on the show, but did not do so. George the Poet, Little Mix, Rag'n'Bone Man and Tom Jones only appeared in the UK broadcast.

Artist(s)	Song	Location filmed
Andra Day	"Rise Up"	US
Niall Horan	"Black and White"	UK
Vishal Mishra	"Aaj Bhi"	India
Sofi Tukker	"Purple Hat"	US
Maren Morris and Hozier	"The Bones"	US and Ireland
Adam Lambert	"Mad World"	US
Rita Ora	"I Will Never Let You Down"	UK
Hussain Al Jassmi	"Bahebek Wahashteni" and "Mohem Jedan"	UAE
Kesha	"Rainbow"	US
Lang Lang & Gina Alice Redlinger	"Four Hands"	US
Virtual orchestra (Note: The virtual orchestra features Renaud Capuçon, Sheku Kanneh-Mason, Kian Soltani, Marielle Labèque, Yo-Yo Ma, Juan José Aguirre, Andreas Ottensamer, Raphaëlle Moreau, Aliya Vodovozova, James Ehnes, Elise Bertrand, Emmanuel Curt, Gérard Caussé and Edgar Moreau)	"The Carnival of the Animals" by Camille Saint-Saëns	Various
Luis Fonsi	"No Me Doy por Vencido"	Puerto Rico
Jennifer Hudson	"Memory"	US
Liam Payne	"Midnight"	UK
Black Coffee and Delilah Montagu	"Drive"	South Africa
The Killers	"Mr. Brightside"	US
Eason Chan	"I Have Nothing"	Hong Kong
Lisa Mishra	"Sanja Ve"	India
Milky Chance	"Stolen Dance"	Germany
Charlie Puth	"See You Again"	US
Jessie Reyez	"Coffin"	US
Picture This	"Troublemaker"	Ireland
Jessie J	"Flashlight"	US
Common	"The Light"	US
Jacky Cheung	"Touch of Love"	Hong Kong
Sebastián Yatra	"Robarte un Beso"	Colombia
Ben Platt	"I Want To Hold Your Hand"	US
Delta Goodrem	"Together We Are One"	Australia
Annie Lennox	"I Saved the World Today"	US
Sheryl Crow	"I Shall Believe"	US
Juanes	"Mas Futuro Que Pasado"	US
Ellie Goulding	"Love Me Like You Do"	UK
Christine and the Queens	"People, I've Been Sad"	France
Zucchero	"Everybody's Got to Learn Sometime"	Italy
Jack Johnson	"Better Together"	US
Kesha	"Praying"	US
Cassper Nyovest	"Malome"	South Africa
Adam Lambert	"Superpower"	US
Sofi Tukker	"Drinkee"	US
Finneas	"Let's Fall in Love for the Night"	US
The Killers	"Caution"	US
Jess Glynne	"I'll Be There"	UK
Sho Madjozi	"Good Over Here"	South Africa
Michael Bublé	"God Only Knows"	Canada
Liam Payne and Rita Ora	"For You"	UK
Common	"God is Love"	US
Christine and the Queens	"Mountains We Met"	France
Ben Platt	"Bad Habit"	US
Picture This	"Winona Ryder"	Ireland
Juanes	"Es Por Ti"	US
Eason Chan	"Love"	Hong Kong
Charlie Puth	"Attention"	US
Leslie Odom Jr. and Nicolette Robinson	"Brown Skin Girl"	US
Billy Ray Cyrus	"Sunshine Girl"	US
Ellie Goulding	"Burn"	UK
Sheryl Crow	"Everyday Is a Winding Road"	US
Hozier	"Take Me to Church"	Ireland
Angèle	"Balance ton Quoi"	Belgium
Sebastián Yatra	"Un Año"	Colombia
SuperM	"With You"	South Korea
Luis Fonsi	"Despacito"	Puerto Rico
Jessie J	"Bang Bang"	US
Lady A	"What I'm Leaving For"	US
Annie Lennox and Lola Lennox	"There Must Be an Angel (Playing with My Heart)"	US
Niall Horan	"Slow Hands"	UK
John Legend	"Bigger Love"	US
Jennifer Hudson	"Hallelujah"	US

==== Appearances (in order of appearance) ====
Celebrity	Occupation	Notes
Jameela Jamil	Actress and presenter	Hour 1 host
Jason Segel	Actor	
Heidi Klum	Model and television personality	
Tim Gunn	Fashion consultant and television personality	
Matt Bomer	Actor	
Jack Black	Actor and musician	
Tijjani Muhammad-Bande	President of the United Nations General Assembly	
Matthew McConaughey	Actor	Hour 2 host
John Legend	Singer	Musical performer on televised broadcast
Chrissy Teigen	Model	
Sarah Jessica Parker	Actress	
Erna Solberg	Prime Minister of Norway	
David Beckham	Footballer	Also appeared in televised portion
Danai Gurira	Actress	Hour 3 host
Lewis Hamilton	Formula One World Champion	
Lilly Singh	YouTuber and television host	
Connie Britton	Actress	
Becky G	Singer	Hour 4 host
Natti Natasha	Singer	
Babajide Sanwo-Olu	Lagos State Governor	
Claudia Sheinbaum	Mayor of Mexico City	
Sadiq Khan	Mayor of London	
Bill de Blasio	Mayor of New York City	
Greg Fischer	Mayor of Louisville	
Matt Damon	Actor	
Anitta	Singer	Introduced Juanes
Laurence Fishburne	Actor	
Kate Winslet	Actress	
Marion Cotillard	Actress	
Jennifer Ehle	Actress	
P. K. Subban	Ice hockey player	
Lindsey Vonn	Skier	
Erin Richards	Actress	
Nomzamo Mbatha	Actress	Introduced Sho Madjozi
Rainn Wilson	Actor	
Laverne Cox	Actress and advocate	Hour 5 host
Megan Rapinoe	Footballer	
T. D. Jakes	Bishop and writer	
Azza Karam	Secretary General of Religions for Peace	
Chidanand Saraswati	Religious leader	
Satpal Singh	Wrestler and coach	
A. R. Bernard	Pastor	
Pierce Brosnan	Actor	
Mike Bloomberg	Businessman and philanthropist	
Sam Heughan	Actor	
Lili Reinhart	Actress	
Marlène Schiappa	Politician	
Martha Delgado	Politician	
Olga Sánchez Cordero	Politician	
Don Cheadle	Actor	Hour 6 host
Samuel L. Jackson	Actor	
Simon Coveney	Politician	
Braun Strowman	Wrestler	
Sasha Banks	Wrestler	
Xavier Woods	Wrestler	
Becky Lynch	Wrestler	
Darren Walker	President of Ford Foundation	
Lady Gaga	Singer	Musical performer on televised broadcast

=== During the global television broadcast ===
Prior to the event, actresses Bridget Moynahan and Lily Tomlin, actor James McAvoy, and tennis player Naomi Osaka were announced to appear in the show, but did not do so.

==== Musical performances (in order of appearance) ====
Artist(s)	Song	Location filmed
Lady Gaga	"Smile"	US
Stevie Wonder	"Lean On Me" / "Love's in Need of Love Today"	US
Paul McCartney	"Lady Madonna"	UK
Kacey Musgraves	"Rainbow"	US
Elton John	"I'm Still Standing"	UK
The Roots featuring Jimmy Fallon	"Safety Dance"	US
Maluma	"Carnaval"	Colombia
Chris Martin (previously recorded on Instagram Live)	"Yellow"	UK
Shawn Mendes and Camila Cabello	"What a Wonderful World"	US
Eddie Vedder	"River Cross"	US
Lizzo	"A Change Is Gonna Come"	US
The Rolling Stones	"You Can't Always Get What You Want"	UK
Keith Urban	"Higher Love"	US
Burna Boy	"African Giant" / "Hallelujah"	Nigeria
Jennifer Lopez	"People"	US
John Legend and Sam Smith	"Stand by Me"	US and UK
Billie Joe Armstrong	"Wake Me Up When September Ends"	US
Billie Eilish and Finneas	"Sunny"	US
Taylor Swift	"Soon You'll Get Better"	US
Lady Gaga, Celine Dion, John Legend, Andrea Bocelli and Lang Lang	"The Prayer"	US/Canada/Italy

==== Appearances (in order of appearance) ====
Celebrity	Occupation
Stephen Colbert	Television personality
Jimmy Fallon	Television personality
Jimmy Kimmel	Television personality
Usher	Musician
Abby Cadabby	Sesame Street fictional character, performed Leslie Carrara-Rudolph
Victoria Beckham	Fashion designer and singer
Henry Golding	Actor
Ellen DeGeneres	Comedian and TV host
Savannah Guthrie	Host of Today
Hoda Kotb	Host of Today
Amy Poehler	Actress
Beyoncé	Singer
Tedros Adhanom	Director-General of the World Health Organization
LL Cool J	Rapper and actor
Shah Rukh Khan	Actor
Norah O'Donnell	Television journalist
Alicia Keys	Singer
António Guterres	Secretary-General of the United Nations
Laura Bush	Former First Lady of the United States
Michelle Obama	Former First Lady of the United States
Lester Holt	Host of NBC Nightly News and Dateline NBC
Melinda Gates and Bill Gates	Philanthropists and former general of Microsoft
David Ho	Doctor
Oprah Winfrey	TV host
James Longman	Journalist
J Balvin	Singer
Priyanka Chopra Jonas	Actress
Kerry Washington	Actress
Idris Elba and his wife Sabrina	Actor
Gayle King	Broadcast journalist
Deborah Roberts	Television journalist
Amina J. Mohammed	Deputy Secretary-General of the United Nations
SpongeBob SquarePants	Fictional character from SpongeBob SquarePants, Recycled from Krusty Krab Training Video
Pharrell Williams	Singer
Lupita Nyong'o	Actress
Oscar the Grouch	Sesame Street fictional character, performed by Eric Jacobson

=== Broadcast ===
The television special was broadcast on NBC, ABC, CBS, and The CW in the United States. It was also aired on Spanish-language television network Univision. The special was also simulcast on networks owned by ViacomCBS (BET, BET Her, CMT, Comedy Central, Logo TV, MTV, MTV2, MTV Classic, MTV Live, Nickelodeon, Paramount Network, Pop, Tr3s, TV Land, and VH1), NBCUniversal (Bravo, E!, MSNBC, NBCSN, Syfy, Universo and USA Network), Walt Disney Television (Freeform and National Geographic), Katz Broadcasting (Bounce TV and Laff), Bloomberg Television, and on AXS TV. iHeartMedia also participated in the broadcast.

In the United Kingdom, the BBC commissioned a Britain-centric broadcast of One World: Together at Home that aired on BBC One on Sunday 19 April at 7:15pm, presented by BBC Radio personalities Clara Amfo, Claudia Winkleman and Dermot O'Leary. Produced for the BBC by Twofour, it featured additional performances from the acts featured in the main special along with exclusive performances from UK acts such as Little Mix and interviews with, and surprises for, front line workers. In Ireland, RTÉ (like the BBC) aired a unique version of One World: Together at Home fronted by comedienne and influencer Dorieann Garrihy and TV presenter Eoghan McDermott.

==== International broadcasters ====
- Africa: BET, Comedy Central, MTV Africa, MTV Base and Vuzu
- Albania: RTSH 2
- Argentina: Telefe, Comedy Central, MTV, MTV Hits, Paramount Network, VH1, VH1 HD, VH1 MegaHits, TNT, AXN, Sony Channel and National Geographic.
- Australia: Network 10, Seven Network, National Geographic, MTV Australia, E! (Australia) and beIN Sports
- Austria: Comedy Central
- Belgium: Eén, Q2, and MTV
- Bolivia: TNT
- Brazil: Rede Globo, Multishow, Comedy Central, MTV, Paramount Network, VH1 HD, VH1 MegaHits, TNT, AXN, and Sony Channel
- Bulgaria: Nova
- Cambodia: beIN Sports
- Canada: CTV, CTV 2, Citytv, Global, CBC, Ici Radio-Canada Télé, ABC Spark, CP24, Much, MTV, National Geographic, TSN, Vrak, iHeartRadio Canada, Kiss Radio, Virgin Radio and CBC Music
- Caribbean: Digicel and TNT
- Central America: TNT, AXN, and Sony Channel
- Chile: Chilevisión, TNT, AXN, and Sony Channel
- Colombia: Caracol Televisión, Comedy Central, MTV, MTV Hits, Paramount Network, VH1 HD, VH1 MegaHits, TNT, AXN, and Sony Channel
- Czech Republic: Prima Comedy Central
- Denmark: TV 2, VH1 and Paramount Network
- East Timor: beIN Sports
- Ecuador: TNT
- Europe: MTV, VH1 and VH1 Classic
- Finland: Yle TV2, Yle Areena and Paramount Network
- France: France 2, France 4, beIN Sports, BET, CStar, MTV, MTV Hits, W9, France Inter and RTL2
- Germany: ZDFneo, RTL, MTV and Comedy Central
- Hong Kong: Joox, TVB Finance & Information Channel, Hong Kong International Business Channel and beIN Sports
- Hungary: RTL Spike, MTV and Comedy Central
- India: AXN, Colors Infinity, Comedy Central, Sony Liv, Sony Pix and VH1
- Indonesia: beIN Sports
- Israel: MTV
- Italy: Rai 1, Rai Radio 2, MTV, VH1, Comedy Central, MTV Music and National Geographic
- Ireland: RTÉ2 and RTÉ 2FM
- Japan: Fuji TV
- Laos: beIN Sports
- Malaysia: beIN Sports
- Mexico: Comedy Central, MTV, MTV Hits, Paramount Network, VH1, VH1 HD, VH1 MegaHits, AXN, and Sony Channel
- Middle East: beIN Sports
- Myanmar: Canal+ Gita
- Netherlands: MTV
- New Zealand: beIN Sports and MTV
- Norway: TV 2
- Paraguay: TNT
- Peru: TNT
- Philippines: beIN Sports
- Poland: Canal+, MTV, Paramount Channel and Comedy Central
- Portugal: TVI
- Romania: Paramount Channel and Comedy Central
- Russia: MTV
- Singapore: MediaCorp Channel 5, meWatch.sg and beIN Sports
- South Africa: Vuzu
- South Korea: SBS MTV and National Geographic
- Southeast Asia: Comedy Central, MTV, Paramount Channel and National Geographic
- Spain: La 1 and MTV
- Sweden: SVT1, TV4 and Paramount Network
- Switzerland: MTV and Comedy Central
- Thailand: beIN Sports
- Turkey: National Geographic and beIn Sports
- United Arab Emirates: Dubai TV
- United Kingdom: BBC One, Channel 5, MTV, MTV Music, Club MTV, MTV Hits, MTV Rocks, MTV Base and MTV OMG
- Uruguay: TNT
- Venezuela: TNT, AXN, and Sony Channel
- Vietnam: K+ NS

==== Online streaming ====
The special was also available on several digital platforms such as Apple, Facebook, Instagram, LiveXLive, Amazon Prime Video, Tidal, TuneIn, Twitch, Twitter, Roblox, Yahoo!, and YouTube. It was planned that Alibaba Youku and Tencent would make streaming in China, but that never happened with no reason made known.

=== Viewership ===
==== Canada ====
In Canada, the special was watched by 3.13 million viewers on CTV and 1.33 million on Global.

==== United States ====
Network	Viewers (million)
NBC	5.40
ABC	5.17
CBS	4.09
MSNBC	1.70
The CW	0.55
Nick at Nite	0.33
USA Network	0.28
BET	0.28
National Geographic	0.27
Comedy Central	0.26
Freeform	0.25
TV Land	0.24
Syfy	0.18
MTV	0.14
Paramount Network	0.14
VH1	0.13

Broadcast network

Cable network

== Impact ==
One World: Together at Home spurred sales gains for the songs performed as part of the event. On April 18, 2020, the songs performed on the show sold more than 12,000 digital downloads—a gain of 735% versus April 17, 2020. The most notable sellers from the two-hour television special were Taylor Swift's "Soon You'll Get Better", Maluma's "Carnaval" and Kacey Musgraves' "Rainbow", as they together accounted for 42% of the total song sales generated by the show. The songs performed during the pre-show broadcast generated 6,000 in sales—up 75% from April 17, 2020.

On April 19, it was reported that the special raised nearly $128 million for coronavirus health care workers. Raising $127 million "puts it on par with the other legendary fundraiser, Live Aid, as the highest grossing charity concert in history," says Forbes. Instead of private individuals, funds were raised from corporations and institutions such as Bloomberg Philanthropies and the Rockefeller Foundation.

Guinness World Records announced on May 22 that the global broadcast special set records for the most musical acts to perform at a remote music festival and the most money raised for charity by a remote music festival. Craig Glenday, Guinness World Records Editor-in-Chief, said in a statement: "The One World: Together at Home special was an extraordinary response to an extraordinary situation. It demonstrates vividly how the power of music can unite us all and help us through challenging times. It's an honor to be able to officially recognize this unforgettable, 'I-Was-There' event as a record-breaker. Congratulations - and thank you - to everyone involved.”

One World: Together at Home inspired Japanese rock band Luna Sea to design and host a similar event in Japan. Music Aid Fest. ~For Post Pandemic~ aired on Fuji TV One on May 31, 2020, and featured live remotely recorded performances by over 25 artists, including Miyavi, Koda Kumi, Ellegarden, Char and Glim Spanky, to elicit monetary donations to support medical workers and others on the frontline of the COVID-19 pandemic.

== Sequel ==
Global Goal: Unite for Our Future was a summit that aimed to highlight the disproportionate impact of the COVID-19 pandemic on marginalized communities. The accompanying music concert took place on June 27, 2020, presented by Dwayne Johnson with performances by Miley Cyrus, Justin Bieber, and Shakira, among others. The concert aired on television in countries such as Germany and Australia. The patron of the cause is Ursula von der Leyen (President of the European Commission).

== See also ==
- iHeart Living Room Concert for America
- Impact of the COVID-19 pandemic on the music industry
- List of highest-grossing benefit concerts
- "Living in a Ghost Town", a single released by The Rolling Stones shortly after their performance here and also featuring a music video about the effects of quarantine
- Saturday Night Seder
- Stronger Together, Tous Ensemble
