= La familia del barrio =

Mexican animated adult web series

- Genre: Animated sitcom
- Created by: Teco Lebrija & Arturo Navarro
- Developed by: Teco Lebrija & Arturo Navarro
- Voices of: Sergio "Teco" Lebrija
- Theme music composer: Arturo Navarro
- Composer: Arturo Navarro
- Country of origin: Mexico
- Original language: Spanish
- No. of seasons: 5
- No. of episodes: 94 (list of episodes)

Production
- Executive producers: Teco Lebrija, Arturo Navarro.
- Producer: Teco Lebrija
- Running time: 20–23 minutes (without commercials)
- Production companies: Firefly Films; MTV Networks Latin America

Original release
- Network: YouTube
- Release: 31 October 2008
- Network: MTV; Comedy Central
- Release: 5 May 2013 – 16 December 2018

La familia del Barrio (lit. transl. The Family from the Neighborhood; figuratively "The del Barrio Family") is a Mexican adult animated sitcom television and web series created by Teco Lebrija and Arturo Navarro and premiered on MTV Latin America on May 5, 2013. It was originally released as a web series for YouTube on October 31, 2008.

== Beginnings and popularity ==
La Familia del Barrio was created in 2004 by Teco Lebrija, eventually uploading its first episode on the YouTube platform on October 31, 2008. The acceptance they had on YouTube allowed them to make the first season on MTV in 2013.

== From social media to television ==
Three or four years approximately after its release on digital platforms, the creators of La Familia del Barrio heard that MTV was looking for an idea for a program in Mexico and the creators presented a pilot called "El Gato Razurado" with which the television channel hired them.

== Main characters ==
- Gaspar: Main character and grandson of El abuelo.
- Jonathan: Gaspar's son.
- Abuelo (Grandpa): Gaspar's father.
- Noruego: Gaspar's friend.
- Olaf: Noruego's son.
- Peluzin: He is their neighbor.

== Genre and theme ==
It is aimed at an adult audience and is characterized by satirizing Mexican society, current affairs and culture with black humor through stories and situations. Its setting is in a fictitious building called Pino, in Mexico City, where the protagonists live. They also go to different places in Mexico and around the world. Also, they mock American culture and politics.

The 2D animation portrays the del Barrio family, which lives together in an apartment. It is formed by Gaspar, Jonathan, Abuelo, Noruego and Olaf in the John F. Kennedy housing unit in the Jardín Balbuena neighborhood in Mexico City, and the show focuses on the lives of the protagonists and their neighbor Peluzín.

== Production and animation ==
Teco Lebrija has directed all the episodes of La Familia del Barrio.

The entire series is made in Adobe Flash, but since 2004 the characters have had different designs until 2013, when the animation was redesigned. MTV gave them creative freedom and they didn't censor anything from any episode.

== Episodes ==
- Season 1: 12 episodes, year 2013
- Season 2: 12 episodes, year 2015
- Season 3: 12 episodes, year 2015-2016
- Season 4: 32 episodes, year 2016-2017
- Season 5: 26 episodes, year 2018

== Streaming ==
In January 2015, the series began streaming on Netflix with only the first season airing. However, in 2016 the series was removed from the streaming service for unknown reasons.

As of September 2020, the series is available on Pluto TV, both live and on demand.

== Film ==
A feature film based on the series under the title La familia del barrio: La película premiered on June 27, 2024, on Vix+.
