= Bibata Ouédraogo =

Burkinabé women's rights activist and educator

Bibata Nébié Ouédraogo
- Occupations: Human rights activist, educator, ambassador
- Children: 6

Bibata Nébié Ouédraogo is a Burkinabé feminist, human rights activist and former school teacher.

== Career ==
Nébié Ouédraogo is well known for her efforts in promoting sexual and reproductive rights as well as rights to maternal health for women in Burkina Faso. She has also conducted research and awareness campaigns about fighting HIV/AIDS, abolishing the death penalty, and serves as a strong advocate against gender discrimination and child marriage. In August 2021, she was listed as one of the seven African women activists who deserve a Wikipedia article by the Global Citizen, an international organization and advocacy organization.

While serving as the Minister of Justice and Human Rights of Burkina Faso in 2023, Nébié Ouédraogo spoke to participants of the International Congress of Justice Ministers in Rome about efforts to abolish the death penalty in her country that led to judicial executions only being allowed in cases of a war crime conviction. She outlined that through these changes and other experiences, she felt confident efforts to abolish the death penalty should continue to move forward within Burkina Faso, citing the justice ministers' gathering as an "inspiration" that is "telling us that we are on the right path."

Up until 2013, she worked as a teacher. From 2013 to the present, she has held many roles in her country in work dedicated to human rights and justice. Her current role as of November 2024 is H.E. (Her Excellency) Ambassador Extraordinary and Plenipotetiary of Burkino Faso to Japan.
