= Paramount Networks Americas =

Division of Paramount Skydance Corporation

- Final logo used since 2022 until 2026
- Formerly: MTV Networks Latin America (1993–2011) Viacom International Media Networks The Americas (2011–2019) ViacomCBS Networks Americas (2019–2022)
- Type: Subsidiary
- Industry: Entertainment; Pay television Interactive media
- Founded: 1993; 33 years ago
- Defunct: 1 January 2026; 10 months ago
- Fate: Merged with Paramount Networks EMEAA
- Successor: Skydance Latin America and Caribbean
- Headquarters: 1111 Lincoln Rd, Miami Beach, Florida, US
- Number of locations: 5 offices
- Area served: Latin America; Canada; United States
- Key people: JC Acosta (president)
- Owner: Paramount International Networks
- Parent: Viacom (1994–2005; 2005–2019); Paramount Global (2019–2025) (Note: Formerly known as ViacomCBS from 2019 to 2022.); Paramount Skydance (2025–2026)
- Subsidiaries: TIS Productions

Paramount Networks Americas (PNA) (formerly MTV Networks Latin America, Viacom International Media Networks The Americas, then ViacomCBS Networks Americas) was a subsidiary of Skydance Corporation. PNA's operational headquarters was located in Miami, Florida.

== Channels ==
=== Canada ===
PNA also managed the Paramount brands in Canada, through joint-ventures or license agreements:

- CMT (10% co-owned with Corus Entertainment)
- Smithsonian Channel (6.67% co-owned with Blue Ant Media)

=== Latin America ===
- MTV
- Nickelodeon
  - Nick Jr.
- Comedy Central

== Former channels ==
=== Discontinued ===
- Club MTV (2021–2025)
- Comedy Central (Brazil) (2012–2025)
- MTV (Brazil) (2013–2025)
- MTV (Canada) (2000–2024)
- MTV2 (Canada) (2001–2024)
- MTV Jams (2006–2015)
- MTV Dance (2015–2021)
- MTV Live HD (2011–2021)
- MTV Hits (Latin America) (2008–2020)
- MTV Hits (Europe) (2014–2025, in Latin America 2020–2025)
- MTV Live (2021–2025)
- MTV 80s (2020–2025)
- MTV 00s (2021–2025)
- Nickelodeon (Brazil) (1996–2025)
- Nick Jr. (Brazil) (2008–2025)
- Nickelodeon (Canada) (2009–2025)
- Nicktoons (Latin America) (2013–2020)
- Nickelodeon GAS (1999–2007/2009)
- Nick 2 (2011–2016 as Nickelodeon HD, 2016–2020)
- NickMusic (2020–2025)
- Paramount Network (2014–2025)
- TeenNick (Latin America) (2020–2025)
- VH1 (Latin America) (2004–2020)
- VH1 (Brazil) (2005–2014)
- VH1 HD (2009–2020)
- VH1 MegaHits (2010–2020)
- VH1 (Europe) (1995–2021, in Latin America 2020–2021)
- VH1 Classic (2004–2020)

=== Channels sold ===
- Chilevisión (sold to Vytal Group of Tomas Yankelevich in 2026)
- Telefe (sold to Grupo Televisión Litoral S.A. of Gustavo Scaglione in 2025)
- Porta dos Fundos (sold back interest to its original founders Fabio Porchat, Gregario Duvivier and Joao Vicente de Castro in 2025)

The company had regional offices in:

- Mexico City, Mexico
- Buenos Aires, Argentina
- Bogotá, Colombia
- Santiago, Santiago Province, Chile
- Toronto, Ontario, Canada (CMT and Smithsonian Channel, owned by Corus Entertainment and Blue Ant Media respectively, used under licensed).

== Rebranding, merger with Paramount Networks EMEAA and Closure ==
The Brazilian operations of what was then-known as MTVNLA, before the rebranding as VIMN The Americas, were called Viacom Networks Brasil, since Abril, the parent company of MTV Brasil, has the exclusive rights to the MTV brand in that country, though, from October 2013, VIMN The Americas reclaimed the MTV brand in Brazil and relaunched the channel as a cable channel. In 2019, the company changes its name to ViacomCBS Networks Americas after the merger of the parent company with CBS Entertainment Group, whose name was used until 2022 when the company changed its name to Paramount Networks Americas after the parent company changes its name to Paramount Global.

Since 2017, Paramount Networks Americas began its merger process with Paramount Networks EMEAA, moving the assets of Nicktoons Latin America to Europe. This process continued in 2023 with the move of assets of Nick Jr. Latin America to Europe in September of that year, and the move of assets of Nickelodeon Latin America to Europe between October and November of the same year. The process was completed in 2024 when MTV Latin America moved its assets to Europe in February of that year, while Comedy Central Latin America followed suit in June of the same year. However, Paramount had clarified that Latin American content would continue to be produced for their respective linear channels.

On 7 October 2025, Paramount announced the closure of all its channels in Brazil on 31 December 2025, thus marking the closure of the company's operations in Brazil after the sale of the production company Porta dos Fundos. In Hispanic America, the channels will continue to operate. That same year, it was made known that the creative teams for Nickelodeon, Nick Jr., MTV and Comedy Central in Latin America had been laid off, announcing that the brands would no longer feature local series and local events, a move that came as part of the closure of Paramount’s Latin American division amid a retrenchment international that entailed massive cost cutting measures by Paramount Skydance Corporation. On 1 January 2026, the dissolution of Paramount Networks Americas was completed after the end of the alliance with the pay TV operator Claro, which caused the departure of its 4 linear channels and of its streaming service Paramount+ from the respective operator. Since then, local third-party advertisements have been removed from the commercial breaks on Nickelodeon, Nick Jr., MTV and Comedy Central respectively. On 6 October 2026, the dissolution of Paramount Networks EMEAA was completed with the acquisition of Warner Bros. Discovery by Paramount Skydance.

== See also ==
- Paramount Media Networks
- Paramount Networks EMEAA
- Paramount International Networks
- Paramount Networks UK & Australia
