= Michael Sheldrick =

Australian author and policy entrepreneur

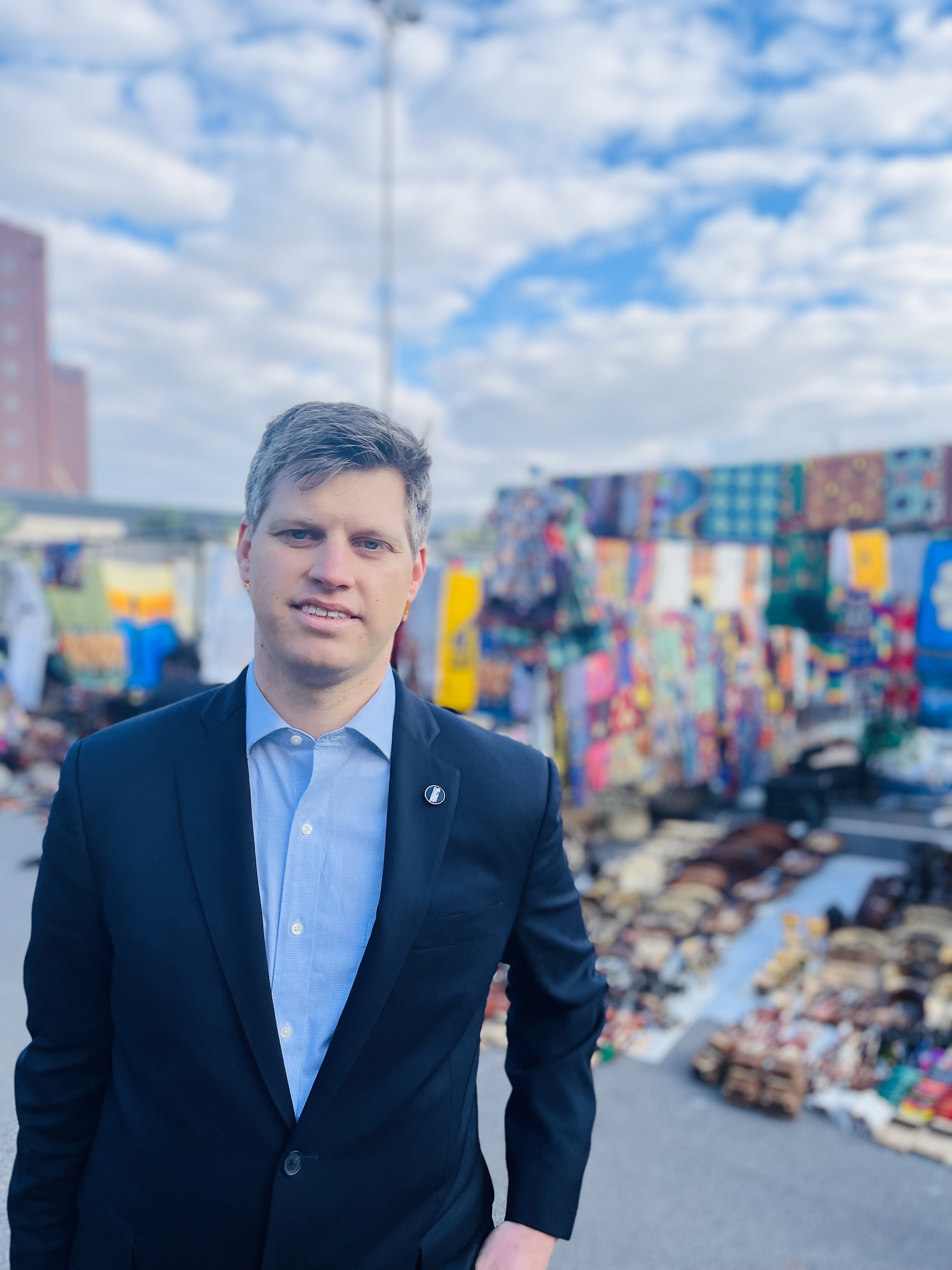
- Born: 1988 (age 37–38)
- Education: University of Western Australia
- Occupations: Author; policy entrepreneur
- Known for: Advocacy for polio eradication, economic development in Africa and climate action

Michael Sheldrick (born 1988) is an Australian author and policy entrepreneur who seeks to address global challenges such as extreme poverty, global health and climate change. He is the co-founder and Chief Policy, Impact and Government Affairs Officer at Global Citizen. Sheldrick is on the board of the 8th Secretary-General of the United Nations Ban Ki-moon's Centre for Global Citizens.

== Life and career ==
=== Education ===
Sheldrick was born in Perth, Australia and is said to have struggled academically growing up. He was once enrolled in special education classes and was told by a teacher that he probably wouldn't make it to university. In 2012, he was named "human tornado" by PerthNow due to his dedication to turn ideas into action. Sheldrick graduated from The University of Western Australia in 2013, with a combined degree in law and arts, majoring in political science and international relations. He became the young Western Australian of the Year in 2013 for his work as a community activist and social justice campaigner.

=== Polio eradication ===
Sheldrick's role in the efforts of polio eradication advocacy in Australia was recognized by Melissa Parke in the Australian Parliament in 2012. While still a student at the University of Western Australia, Sheldrick co-founded Global Poverty Project, now known as Global Citizen, in 2008 along with Hugh Evans and Simon Moss. In 2011, he had written a letter to then-Australian Prime Minister Julia Gillard, which prompted her to meet him and then agree to put The End of Polio campaign on the agenda of the 2011 Commonwealth Heads of Government Meeting. He had been informed by the Bill & Melinda Gates Foundation that it was unlikely that aid would be available from the Australian government; however, he managed to secure a $50 million contribution towards the campaign from the Australian government and nearly $70 million from other world leaders.

In 2015, Sheldrick said he contacted the then-Maltese Prime Minister Joseph Muscat which led to Malta's initiative to boost awareness needed for the international community to take further action against Polio.

=== Work in Africa ===
Sheldrick's work has garnered international attention and recognition, particularly in the African continent. In 2018, Global Citizen launched “Global Citizen Festival - Mandela 100” to celebrate the centennial birthday of Nelson Mandela, which galvanized 16 governments, eight international organizations, and 12 corporations to make financial and political commitments to work in a collaborative manner to tackle poverty. During the same year, he also traveled to Senegal with Rhianna to petition for US$2.3 billion to support education in developing countries. In 2019, Sheldrick participated in the Global Goal Live: Nigeria Policy Forum in Lagos which focused on working with private sector philanthropy and government to achieve the SDGs and end poverty. In 2022, the Global Citizen Festival in Ghana’s Black Star Square spurred the establishment of an "Africa Prosperity Fund", a $1 billion development funding pledge compiled solely by African governments and launched jointly by the governments of Ghana and South Africa. Sheldrick believes Ghana’s success symbolizes what is achievable, as the country has seen great success in reducing poverty, building institutions, providing healthcare and education. In August 2024, Sheldrick led a delegation of Global Citizen, Bridgewater Associates and Harith General Partners to Côte D'Ivoire ahead of an economic summit scheduled for October 2024. The summit is intended to foster partnerships between governments, private sector and multilateral development banks for the Côte D'Ivoire and the region.

=== Climate action ===
Sheldrick believes that addressing climate change and ending extreme poverty are two sides of one coin. He argues that the current hunger crisis is a result of poor governance and decades of poor choices that has left farmers ill-equipped, and that the climate and food crises are intertwined and that global governmental leaders must proactively intervene. In 2021, Sheldrick through Global Citizen partnered with Google, FCB and 360i to create a video of a burning photograph to tap into viewer emotions to protect the planet. In 2023, Global Citizen launched a climate action campaign known as Power Our Planet. Sheldrick has been an advocate in using the power of music to drive social change. For example, in 2024 the Global Citizen Festival became one of the major U.S. festivals to move away from diesel generators and be powered by hybrid energy, using the same SmartGrid battery system used by Coldplay during its Music of the Spheres World Tour. In 2025, the Global Citizen holds its first festival in Latin America in Brazil alongside artists such as Seu Jorge, Gilberto Gil, Anitta, Gaby Amarantos, and Chris Martin from Coldplay as well as local indigenous leaders.

=== Collaboration with the WHO ===
As the Chief Policy, Impact and government affairs officer at Global Citizen, Sheldrick leads the policy efforts at the organization including its partnership with the World Health Organization. In June 2013, the two parties signed a Memorandum of Understanding with the main objectives to support global efforts to overcome inequities in public health. This follows WHO’s collaboration with Global Citizen on multiple campaigns including One World: Together At Home, which raised almost US$128 million.

== Writing ==
=== From Ideas to Impact ===
Sheldrick is the author of From Ideas to Impact: A Playbook for Influencing and Implementing Change in a Divided World (2024), which features a foreword by United Nations Goodwill Ambassadors Idris Elba and Sabrina Dhowre. The book offers an eight-step guide to policy entrepreneurship, using real life examples to illustrate the visionary, diplomatic, and implementation approaches in problem solving. Sheldrick draws on his own experiences and those he encountered globally from activists, small business owners to everyday citizens. Examples in the book include Collie, Western Australia, which is in the process of energy transition away from fossil fuels. The book has also received other endorsements including from British rock band and philanthropists Coldplay.
