= VH1 (Brazilian TV channel) =

VH1 Brazil
- Final logo used from 29 April 2013 to 12 December 2014
- Country: Brazil
- Broadcast area: Brazil
- Headquarters: São Paulo

Programming
- Picture format: 480i (SDTV); 1080i (HDTV)

Ownership
- Owner: Viacom International Media Networks The Americas (Viacom)
- Sister channels: MTV; Nickelodeon; Comedy Central; VH1 MegaHits

History
- Launched: 21 November 2005; 20 years ago
- Closed: 12 December 2014; 11 years ago
- Replaced by: Paramount Channel

Links
- Website: www.vh1brasil.com.br

VH1 Brasil was a music channel from Viacom-owned Viacom International Media Networks The Americas. The network was launched in November 2005 on some cable systems, but it was not until May 2006 that it was launched on DirecTV Brazil, replacing MTV Latin America.

It targets 25- to 44-year-olds and plays local and international music videos from the 1970s to the 2000s. It also airs famous "Top 20" and "Top 40" countdowns from VH1 USA. At its launch, VH1's Celebreality shows, such as The Surreal Life, Breaking Bonaduce, My Fair Brady, Supergroup and So NoTORIous, were not aired on VH1 Brasil, yet they did air on its sister network, VH1 Latin America. However, since September 2006, the network has started running those shows, starting with The Surreal Life. VH1 Brasil also airs The Graham Norton Show, MTV-produced Next and Comedy Central-produced South Park.

VH1 Brasil replaced VH1 Soul on SKY Brasil, where it was available in the country since 2004, though, in 2013, SKY replaced VH1's standard-definition feed with the relaunched MTV, while retaining VH1 HD. In December 12, 2014, VH1 was also taken off from NET, being replaced with a local version of VH1 MegaHits. VH1 Brasil was replaced by Paramount Channel on November 14, 2014.

== VH1 HD ==
VH1 HD
- Final logo used from December 1, 2009 to October 7, 2020
- Country: Brazil
- Broadcast area: Latin America
- Headquarters: São Paulo

Programming
- Language: English
- Picture format: 1080i (HDTV)

Ownership
- Owner: ViacomCBS Networks Americas
- Sister channels: VH1 Latin America; VH1 MegaHits

History
- Launched: December 1, 2009 (Brazil); 2014 (Latin America)
- Closed: October 7, 2020
- Replaced by: VH1 Europe

VH1 HD was a Brazilian television channel dedicated to music programming, owned by ViacomCBS Networks Americas. It was launched on December 1, 2009, and started broadcasting in the rest of Latin America in 2014.

It specialized on airing current high-definition music videos. It had independent programming, separate from either VH1 Brazil or VH1 Latin America, both of which were centered on airing music videos from artists of the 1970s to the 1990s and thus was only broadcast in 4:3 SDTV.

The station never had its ratings measured. On October 7, 2020, VH1 HD was replaced by a high-definition simulcast of VH1 Europe. The latter also replaced VH1 Latin America, now serving as the channel's 4:3 letterboxed feed. The replacement came after some specialized channels of ViacomCBS were shut down, like MTV Hits Latin America (which was replaced with MTV Hits Europe) and VH1 MegaHits (which was replaced with NickMusic). Since VH1 Europe was replaced with MTV 00s in Europe, the VH1 HD channel was shut down in Latin America.

== See also ==
- VH1
- MTV Networks Latin America
