= Rio Branco do Sul =

Coordinates: 25°10′S 49°18′W

- Municipality
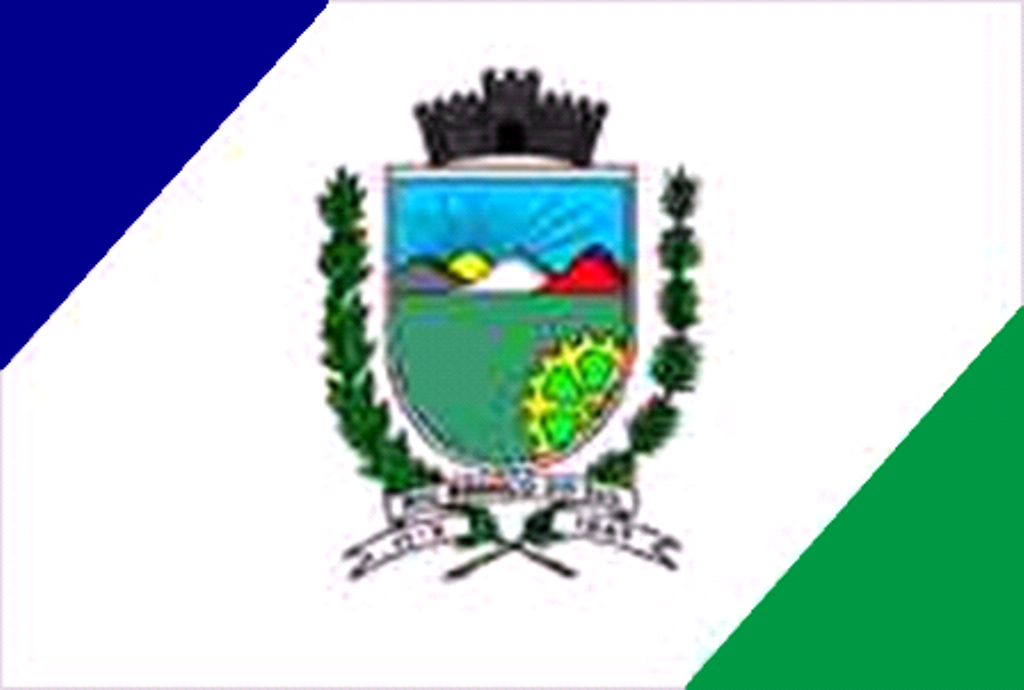
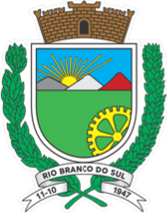
- Flag Coat of arms
- Interactive map of Rio Branco do Sul
- Country: Brazil
- Region: Southern
- State: Paraná
- Mesoregion: Metropolitana de Curitiba

Population (2020)
  - Total: 32,517
- Time zone: UTC−3 (BRT)
- Website: riobrancodosul.pr.gov.br

Rio Branco do Sul is a municipality in the state of Paraná in the Southern Region of Brazil.

== Notable people ==
Bruna Louise, Comedian

== See also ==
- List of municipalities in Paraná
