= VH1 (Latin America) =

- Final logo used from April 29, 2013 to October 7, 2020
- Headquarters: Miami Beach, Florida

Programming
- Picture format: 4:3 (SDTV)

Ownership
- Owner: ViacomCBS Networks Americas (ViacomCBS)
- Sister channels: Comedy Central; MTV; VH1 MegaHits; MTV Hits; MTV Live HD; VH1 HD; Nick Jr. Nickelodeon; Paramount Network

History
- Launched: 1 April 2004; 22 years ago
- Closed: 7 October 2020; 6 years ago
- Replaced by: VH1 Europe

VH1 Latin America was a music channel from ViacomCBS-owned ViacomCBS Networks Americas. The network was launched on 1 April 2004 exclusively on Cablevisión D.F. in Mexico, and in the rest of the region some months later. The channel targeted audience from 19 to 44 years old and played local and international music videos from the 1970s to the 2000s. It also aired famous countdowns from American VH1. It reached most of the satellite and cable systems in Latin America. VH1 Soul, another channel of MTV Networks and sister channel of VH1 was also available in the region.

== History ==
VH1 Latin America first logo, used from 2004 to 2013.

The channel was launched on 1 April 2004 only on Cablevisión in Mexico. Eventually, it started reaching other countries, and as of 2006 it was available in most of the countries of Latin America.

On 29 April 2009 the channel launched a new image, with new idents, bumpers and new colors for the logo. The new identity was called "look & feel" and represents the beginnings of color television.

On 29 April 2013 the channel began to use the current logos and idents used by its parent channel.

On October 7, 2020 the channel closed down and was replaced by VH1 Europe.

== Controversy ==
On January 29, 2007, VTR added the network in a channel slot timeshared with GolTV. This caused anger among its subscribers, which only grew when VTR added FX to the same channel slot on May, making VH1 available only after midnight. In August, the channel was pulled off with no notification given. Despite this, VH1 was added back in early-2009 on its own channel slot. The channel was withdrawn in mid-April 2020.

== See also ==
- VH1
- VH1 Europe
- VH1 UK
- VH1 Brazil
- Paramount Networks Americas
- Paramount Skydance
