= Daniella Cicarelli =

Former Brazilian model and TV show hostess

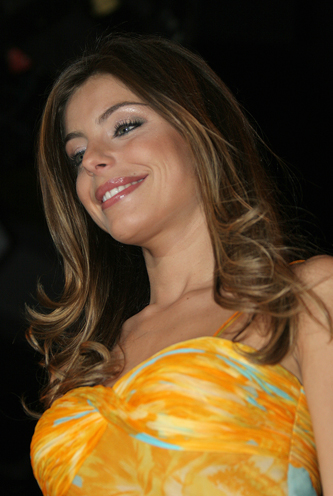
- Cicarelli in 2005
- Born: Daniella Cicarelli Lemos; 6 November 1978 (age 48); Belo Horizonte, Brazil
- Occupations: Model; TV host
- Years active: 1998–present
- Spouses: Ronaldo (m. 2005–2005) Frederico Schiliró (m. 2011–2015) Guilherme Menge (m. 2017)
- Children: 1
- Modeling information
- Height: 1.77 m (5 ft 10 in)
- Hair color: Brown
- Eye color: Green

Daniella Cicarelli Lemos (born 6 November 1978) is a Brazilian former model and TV show hostess for MTV Brasil's Beija Sapo. She was engaged to Brazilian footballer Ronaldo for three months in 2005.

== Biography ==
=== Early life and education ===
Cicarelli was born in Belo Horizonte. She is the daughter of Yara Cicarelli and Antonio de Padua Lemos. She is a descendant of Italian immigrants, and was raised Catholic. Cicarelli started her modeling career when she was about 20 years old in 1996, while still enrolled in a Business Administration course. She moved to São Paulo in 1998. She later graduated with a law degree from FMU.

=== Career ===
In January 2001, Cicarelli became nationally known in Brazil when she starred in a Pepsi commercial. She then played the character Larissa in the soap opera As Filhas da Mãe, by Silvio de Abreu, as a pair of actor Reynaldo Gianecchini. She became the host of Beija Sapo, a blind-date variety show on MTV Brasil.

=== YouTube controversy ===
In September 2006, a video of Cicarelli having sex with her boyfriend on a beach in Tarifa, Spain was shot by paparazzo Miguel Temprano and broadcast on the TV show Dolce Vita on the Spanish station Telecinco. The video spread around the internet. Cicarelli's partner sued, and was granted legal injunctions against YouTube and other websites, leading to several Brazilian ISPs blocking YouTube. In January 2007 after a legal decision, YouTube was blocked in Brazil for two days, resulting in 5.7 million users being blocked. This decision was criticized by internet watch groups for being a controversial act that affected millions of users. This happened when Cicarelli worked as a host on MTV Brasil, leading to nearly 80,000 emails protesting the decision. Some individuals also protested outside the TV station.

In 2007, YouTube won the case, on the basis that there is no expectation of privacy on a public beach. Cicarelli appealed and in 2008 the Supreme Court of the state of São Paulo reversed the decision, ruling that the video violated privacy and lacked public interest. The lawsuit was finally decided in 2015, when Cicarelli and her boyfriend in the video were each awarded damages of R$250,000 (US$64,000) from Google by the Superior Court of Justice of Brazil. YouTube remains active in Brazil.

== Filmography ==
=== As a presenter ===
Year	Title	TV channel
2003	Notícias de Biquíni	MTV Brasil
2003–04	Daniella no país da MTV	MTV Brasil
2004–05	Dance o Clipe	MTV Brasil
2005–07	Beija Sapo	MTV Brasil
2007	Batalha de Modelos	MTV Brasil
2008	Quem Pode Mais?	Band
2008–09	Band Verão	Band
2009–10	Zero Bala	Band
2012	Provão MTV	MTV Brasil
2014	Domingo da Gente	Rede Record

=== As an actress ===
Year	Title	Role	Notes
2001	As Filhas da Mãe	Larissa	Telenovela
2004	Didi Quer Ser Criança	Kátia	Movie

=== Participation ===
Year	Title	Role	TV channel
2013	Got Talent Brasil	Sworn	Rede Record
2015	Desafiados do Caldeirão	Participant	Rede Globo
