= Bruna Louise =

Brazilian comedian (born 1984)

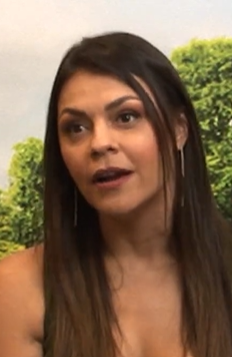
- Louise in 2023
- Born: Bruna Louise de Castro e Castro; September 6, 1984 (age 41); Rio Branco do Sul, Paraná, Brazil
- Occupations: comedian; content creator; television host; actress
- Years active: 2010–present
- Awards: 2020 MTV MIAW Awards Brazil – Ri Alto

Bruna Louise de Castro e Castro (born 6 September 1984), professionally known as Bruna Louise (Brazilian Portuguese pronunciation: [ˈbɾu.nɐ luˈi.zi]), is a Brazilian comedian, content creator, television host, and actress. Noted as one of the early female performers in Brazil's stand-up comedy scene, she is currently among the country's most popular comedians.

Louise became the first Brazilian female comedian to premiere a solo stand-up comedy special on Netflix, titled Bruna Louise: Demolição, released in June 2022.

== Biography and career ==
=== Early life ===
Graduated in performing arts in Rio de Janeiro, Bruna Louise began her career in theater performing in dramatic plays, despite her interest in comedy. She started in stand-up comedy in 2010, joining and producing a group in Curitiba after a former boss claimed she had no talent for comedy.

=== 2014–2019: Deixa Eu Te Contar and Desbocada ===
Louise and fellow comedian Kéfera Buchmann premiered the play Deixa Eu Te Contar at the Regina Vogue Theater in Curitiba in December 2014. A few months later, they embarked on a national tour, which was attended by over 100,000 people.

In 2015, she created her YouTube channel, Desbocada, and began producing comedy videos. In 2016, she launched her first stand-up tour, named after her channel (the channel's name was later changed to her real name).

In 2019, she recorded her first comedy special, Desbocada, at the Nósmenos Theater and released it on her channel. In November of the same year, Netflix premiered Lugar de Mulher, a stand-up series consisting of four 15-minute episodes featuring different comedians. Louise was one of the guests, alongside Micheli Machado, Cintia Rosini, and Carol Zoccoli.

=== 2020–2022: A Culpa É da Carlota, Demolição and Juntas ===
In 2020, she joined the panel of hosts for the program A Culpa É da Carlota on Comedy Central. On June 22, 2022, Bruna Louise: Demolição ("Bruna Louise: Demolition") was released, making Louise the first Brazilian woman to star in a solo stand-up special on the streaming platform.

"It is a demolition of the taboos of being a woman on stage [...] going against the myth that we are not funny. My show comes from my life [...] in this Netflix solo, I talk about paternal abandonment, when I went to meet my father, family stories [...] so they are very personal issues. I hope my work opens more doors for female comedians." (Note: Original Portuguese: "Trata-se de uma demolição dos tabus de ser uma mulher em cima de um palco [...] ir contra o mito de que não somos engraçadas. O meu show surgiu da minha vida [...] nesse solo da Netflix, eu falo de abandono paterno, quando fui conhecer meu pai, histórias da minha família [...] são questões muito pessoais. Espero que meu trabalho abra mais portas para humoristas mulheres.") — Louise on the themes of her Netflix special.

During the same period, she was invited to be the commentator for the reality show Brincando com Fogo: Brasil.

In 2022, she launched the project Juntas ("Together"), a series of comedy specials created with the goal of introducing other female comedians and strengthening the female presence in Brazilian stand-up comedy. The first edition was released in February, featuring Niny Magalhães, Renata Said, and Arianna Nutt. In May, the second edition was released with Viviana Freitas, Ste Marques, and Paloma Santos. The third edition, released in April, featured guests Babu Carreira, Cintia Rosini, and Yas Fiorelo.

=== 2023–present: Burnout, Ela Tá Correndo Atrás and O Que Passa Na Cabeça Dela? ===
In 2023, she began her national and international tour, Burnout. The final session was recorded and released in February 2024 as her third comedy special. Louise also made her dubbing debut film Strays, voicing the Brazilin version character Maggie. Also in 2023, she went on a short tour in Italy, starting with a performance in Milan at the San Fedele Auditorium. The following day, she performed at the Murialdo Theater in Turin, and a few days later, she took the stage at the Flavio Theater in Rome.

In 2024, her tour Ela Tá Correndo Atrás ("She's Going After It") began. In January 2025, Louise joined OnlyFans for comedic content that could not be monetized on YouTube. Her new tour, O Que Passa Na Cabeça Dela? ("What is Going on Inside Her Head?"), premiered in March 2025.

== Personal life ==
Louise is openly bisexual. She was born in Rio Branco do Sul and raised in Curitiba in an all-female household by her mother, Inês Claret de Castro. Her father abandoned the family at the time of her birth, and she met him for the first time in 2021, at the age of 36.

== Filmography ==
=== Film ===
List of film credits
Year	Title	Role	Notes	Ref.
2022	Esposa de Aluguel (Note: In English, Someone Borrowed.)	Maria Clara Pereira	Netflix film	
2022	Rir para Não Chorar	Herself		
2023	Strays	Maggie (voice)	Brazilian Portuguese dub	

=== Television ===
List of television credits
Year	Title	Role	Notes	Ref.
2016–2017	Ceará Fora da Casinha	Host	Multishow	
2020–2021	A Culpa É da Carlota	Host	Comedy Central	
2021	LOL: Se Rir, Já Era!	Contestant	Prime Video reality show	
2021–2022	Brincando com Fogo: Brasil	Narrator	Netflix reality show	
2025	Aberto ao Público	Host		

== Stand-up specials ==
Year	Title	Platform	Notes	Ref.
2016	Desbocada	YouTube	Released on her official channel	
2017	Lugar de Mulher	Netflix	Episode: "Bruna Louise"	
2022	Bruna Louise: Demolição	Netflix	Solo special	
2022	Juntas	YouTube	Episodes 1–3	
2024	Burnout	YouTube	Solo special	

== Live performances and tours ==
=== Theater ===
Year	Production	Role	Director	Ref.
2014-2015	Deixa Eu Te Contar	Bruna	Ana Paula Lima	

=== Tours ===
- Desbocada (2019)
- Deslocada (2022)
- Burnout (2023–2024)
- Ela Tá Correndo Atrás (2024)
- O Que Passa Na Cabeça Dela? (2025)

== Awards and nominations ==
Year	Award	Category	Result	Ref.
2020	MTV MIAW Awards Brazil	Ri Alto	Won	
2021	MTV MIAW Awards Brazil	Ri Alto	Nominated	
2022	MTV MIAW Awards Brazil	Ri Alto	Nominated	
