= Catfish Brasil =

Documentary

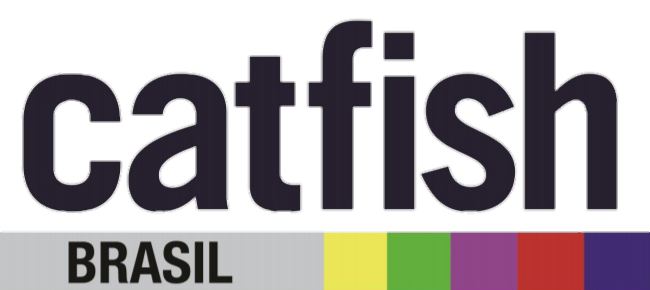
- Genre: Reality
- Based on: Catfish by Henry Joost; Ariel Schulman
- Presented by: Ciro Sales; Ricardo Gadelha
- Country of origin: Brazil
- Original language: Portuguese
- No. of seasons: 3
- No. of episodes: 22

Production
- Camera setup: Multiple
- Running time: 48 to 50 minutes
- Production companies: Animus Productions; Brazil Production Services; Panorâmica

Original release
- Network: MTV
- Release: August 31, 2016 – October 10, 2018

Catfish Brasil is a Brazilian reality-based documentary television series airing on MTV about the truths and lies of online dating. The series is based on the American television series Catfish and is co-hosted by Ciro Sales and Ricardo Gadelha. It premiered on August 31, 2016.

== Series overview ==
Season	Episodes	Originally aired	
Season	Episodes	First aired	Last aired
1ª.	8	August 31, 2016	October 19, 2016
2ª.	4	September 20, 2017	October 11, 2017
3ª.	10	July 25, 2018	October 10, 2018
