= La familia del barrio: La película =

- Promotional release poster
- Directed by: Rhajov Villafuerte
- Screenplay by: Sergio Lebrija
- Based on: La familia del barrio by Teco Lebrija & Arturo Navarro
- Starring: Sergio Lebrija
- Production company: Lemon Studios
- Distributed by: Vix+
- Release date: June 28, 2024
- Running time: 78 minutes
- Country: Mexico
- Language: Spanish

La familia del barrio: La película (lit. transl. The Family from the Neighborhood: The movie; figuratively "The del Barrio Family: The movie") is a 2024 Mexican adult animated science fiction comedy film directed by Rhajov Villafuerte and written by Sergio Lebrija. It is based on the television series and web series of the same name created by Teco Lebrija and Arturo Navarro.

== Synopsis ==
La familia del barrio must correct the mistake of 'El Noruego' who got Miguel Hidalgo y Costilla drunk, preventing Mexico from gaining independence from New Spain.

== Voice cast ==
- Sergio Lebrija as Gaspar / El Noruego / Abuelo / Johnny / Peluzín

== Release ==
The film premiered on June 27, 2024, on Vix+.
