= Michele Anthony =

American music executive

- Occupation: Music industry executive
- Years active: 1990–present
- Organization: Universal Music Group
- Father: Dee Anthony

Michele Anthony is an American music industry executive and the executive vice president of Universal Music Group.

== Early life ==
Anthony grew up in the music industry as her father, Dee Anthony, managed artists including Tony Bennett and Peter Frampton. She began working in his office at age 12, and by 14 she was on the road with Joe Cocker. "It was a unique childhood that really gave me an education in the music industry," Anthony told Gillian G. Gaar in She's a Rebel: The History of Women in Rock & Roll.

Anthony graduated from George Washington University, and also holds a J.D. from the University of Southern California.

== Career ==
=== 1990-2012: Sony Music and 7H Entertainment ===
Anthony first worked as a partner of the Beverly Hills entertainment law firm, Rosenfeld, Kassoy, & Kraus, with clients such as Rick Rubin, The Sugarcubes, The Pixies, Alice in Chains, Ozzy Osbourne, Guns N' Roses, Soundgarden, The Go-Go's, Kiss, The Eagles, and Mother Love Bone.

In 1990, she joined Sony Music as senior VP of domestic operations, and was responsible for managing the company's regional A&R offices, as well as overseeing new company projects and development. In 1994, Sony Music named her the executive vice president, and she was named COO in 2004. She was appointed president of Sony Music Group in 2005.She played a pivotal role in the signing of key artists such as Pearl Jam, Aerosmith, Rage Against the Machine, and The Offspring.

In 2006, she left Sony and founded 7H Entertainment, a consulting and management agency with clients that included Pearl Jam, Prince, Black Sabbath & Ozzy Osbourne, Bjork, Soundgarden and Macy Gray.

=== Universal Music Group ===
After heading 7H for six years, Lucian Grainge, CEO of Universal Music Group, named Michele Anthony as executive vice president of Universal Music Group, a newly created role, in 2013.

Anthony serves on the company's executive management board and helps with the daily management of the labels and the company's operations. Among her responsibilities, she oversees the company's Commercial Services Division which includes sales, live events, label merchandising, college marketing and fan and consumer engagement. She also oversees UMG's global brand partnerships, Universal Music Canada, and Universal Music Enterprises, UMG's catalog division. Additionally, she jointly oversees UMG's film, television and theatrical projects.

=== Other industry ventures ===
Michele Anthony also chairs the Global Poverty Project (GPP) - Global Citizens Ticket Initiative and is an advisor for GPP's Annual Central Park Global Citizen Festival. She has served on the boards of several music industry organizations, including the Recording Industry Association of America (RIAA), Rock and Roll Hall of Fame, and Rock the Vote.

== Industry honors ==
In 2014, Anthony topped Billboard's Women in Music list, credited with reviving the Island and Def Jam record labels, and helping to reshape the company's strategy for the marketplace. In 2015, she was again named to Billboard's Women in Music list, credited for expanding revenue "in areas of expertise that we either didn't have or that needed to be reimagined." Anthony made the list again in 2016, credited with building UMG's branding strategy, sponsorships, and digital marketing. For almost twenty years, Anthony has been named one of the top women in entertainment in The Hollywood Reporter's annual "Women in Entertainment" issue.

== Personal life ==
In an interview with Billboard in 2017, Anthony named her father and Gloria Steinem as the two biggest influences in her life and credits her mother for her work ethic.

In a 2025 interview with Variety, Anthony said about Soundgarden manager Susan Silver: "Meeting Susan and the band as a very young lawyer and having the honor of representing them changed my life forever. Susan was and still is the den mother of what was one of the most flourishing and important music communities of our generation. She embraced me into that pioneering community of musicians, just as it was on the verge of changing music and culture forever. Soundgarden, with Susan as their manager, helped define that change. That was also the beginning of our lifetime friendship."
