= Beija Sapo =

- Genre: Dating show
- Presented by: Daniella Cicarelli (2005–07); Valentina Bandeira (2023–)
- Country of origin: Brazil
- Original language: Portuguese
- No. of seasons: 5
- No. of episodes: 122

Production
- Running time: 90 minutes (Original); 30 minutes (Revival); 40 minutes (2024)
- Production companies: MTV Entertainment Studios; TeleImage

Original release
- Network: MTV Brasil
- Release: 9 March 2005 – 7 December 2007
- Network: MTV/PlutoTV
- Release: 17 September 2023 – present

Beija Sapo also called Tinder Apresenta: MTV Beija Sapo is a Brazilian dating show produced and broadcast by MTV Brasil and hosted by Daniella Cicarelli. On September 17, 2023, the show launched a new season, hosted by Valentina Bandeira, originally aired on the streaming service Pluto TV and broadcast the following day by MTV, the successor to the original network.

The title means "kissing toads" in Portuguese.

In the show, a participant called the "prince" or "princess" must choose one out of three contestants, completely dressed up as toads, to kiss them at the end of the program. The program's scenery resembles a medieval castle, in order to give a fairy tale atmosphere to it.

The whole choosing process includes getting to know the "toads"' bedrooms, presented by close friends of theirs, asking the "toads" several questions, and even getting them to sing the "prince" or "princess" a song, with new lyrics written by themselves, often begging them a chance. The chosen "toad" will eventually become a "prince/ss" as well, and the show ends as the final kiss happens.

The dismissed contestants still have the opportunity of kissing someone else. Right after their dismissal, Daniella Cicarelli picks out some people from the audience, so that the one who screams the sentence "Help me out, Cicarelli!!" louder will be able to kiss the eliminated "toad".

There has been also several lesbian and gay special editions, making it the first television series on Brazilian terrestrial television to broadcast a gay kiss before 8 pm, that is, on a timeslot rated appropriate for children and teenagers by the Brazilian Ministry of Justice.

Beija Sapo airs every Fridays, at 7:00pm, on MTV Brasil. It's the highest-rated show on the channel and was made to replace Fica Comigo (which was the highest-rated show on the channel before Beija Sapo).

== Series overview ==
Series	Episodes	Originally released		
Series	Episodes	First released	Last released	Network
1	40	9 March 2005	7 December 2005	MTV Brasil
2	46	3 March 2006	15 December 2006	MTV Brasil
3	40	9 March 2007	7 December 2007	MTV Brasil
4	12	17 September 2023	3 December 2023	Pluto TV; MTV
5	10	29 August 2024	31 October 2024	Pluto TV; MTV

== See also ==
- MTV Brasil
- Daniella Cicarelli
