= Nickelodeon (Latin America) =

Latin American variant of Nickelodeon

- Logo used since August 29, 2023 (Note: The logo's wordmark has been in use since April 5, 2010. Additionally, this logo was seen as a screenbug a few weeks earlier, most likely as a test, and is a variant meant to be used for white backgrounds; the main variant has a white wordmark in conjunction with a fully orange splat.)
- Broadcast area: Hispanic America; Caribbean

Programming
- Languages: Spanish; English (via SAP track)
- Picture format: 1080i HDTV (downscaled to 16:9/4:3 480i/576i for the SDTV feeds)

Ownership
- Owner: Skydance Latin America and Caribbean
- Parent: Nickelodeon Group
- Sister channels: Nick Jr. MTV; Comedy Central

History
- Launched: 20 December 1996; 29 years ago

Links
- Website: nickelodeon.la

Nickelodeon is a Latin American pay television channel and a regional variant of the American channel of the same name. It is owned by Skydance Latin America and Caribbean, a subsidiary of Skydance Corporation, and was launched on 20 December 1996.

In addition to broadcasting programming from Nickelodeon and Nick Jr., the channel has produced original content for the Latin American market. It is distributed through local cable and satellite providers throughout the region, with the exception of Cuba, where cable television services are prohibited.

== History ==
The channel was launched on 20 December 1996 in Latin America as a child-oriented channel, being the main competitor of Cartoon Network, which was launched three years before. In 1999, Nickelodeon launched its official website for the region, MundoNick.com. "Nick Radio" was also available, but eventually it was replaced by the Nick Jr. official site.

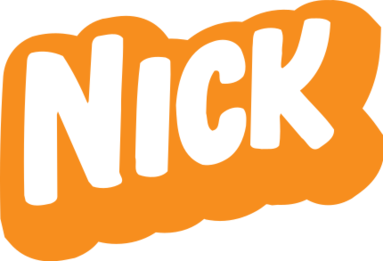
Logo used from 2005 to 2009, the logo has an original prototype 3D logo

On 13 February 2006, a programming block named Nick at Nite was launched. It consisted mostly of live-action shows from the 1980s and 1990s, and aired from 10 pm to 6 am. On 15 May 2006, it premiered their first sitcom locally produced in Mexico, Skimo.

On 9 June 2008, the channel launched "Nickers", a live-action show with two hosts introducing shows and music. It followed a similar concept to Disney Channel's Zapping Zone. The block was cancelled in all feeds in December 2008. In 2008, two locally produced series premiered, both being soap operas. The first one, Isa TKM premiered on 29 September 2008 and La maga y el camino dorado premiered on 13 October of that same year.

In 2009, a programming block called Nick Hits, which aired classic Nicktoons, replaced Nick at Nite on weekends. On 5 April 2010, Nickelodeon Latin America was rebranded to match with other international Nickelodeon feeds around the world, making it one of the last Nickelodeon international feeds to switch to the new graphics. Following the rebrand, NickHits was discontinued and replaced again by Nick at Nite. In June 2010, Viacom gave the rights for Mexico to produce their own Kids' Choice Awards. It premiered on 4 September 2010. On 20 July 2010, another original series called Sueña conmigo premiered on the channel.

Logo used from 2010 to 2023

In August 2010, Nickelodeon started to rerun the animated series Avatar: The Last Airbender to promote the 2010 film adaptation; with this, a new on-air logo was shown when the series was broadcast, an arrow blurring takes on or off in the Nick logo. On 2 May 2011, it was premiered the fifth original production Grachi. In January 2012, MTV Networks Latin America announced another locally produced soap opera, Miss XV, which premiered on 16 April 2012.

In 2012, the Nick at Nite programming block replaced its programming from the 1980s and 1990s with some of Nickelodeon's 2000s and 2010s series.

On 1 January 2015, the Nick at Nite programming block was discontinued.

On 29 August 2023, nearly 6 months after its rebrand in the US, Nickelodeon rebranded to the splat era during the 2023 Mexico Kids' Choice Awards.

On 17 October 2023, the Panregional feed of Nickelodeon delocalised and started to use some assets from EMEAA, except for the Mexico feed. Trailers are now textless and end credits on Panregional feed are replaced with short credits, indicating the show's name, production company and year, similar to the Nickelodeon channels in EMEAA. However, the channel is still retaining some localization, such as advertisements, localised text on selected trailers, and opt-outs for local programming. This is a result of Nick Jr.'s delocalisation on September 19, 2023.

On 14 November 2023, the Mexico feed migrated to the EMEAA playout, screenbug and banners. However, it still retained the graphics, promos and end credits (except dubbing credits) until 1 September 2025, when the Mexico feed underwent technical changes similar to those experienced by the Panregional feed in October 2023.. While it shared the same programming as the Panregional feed, the two feeds are remained separated as trailers in the Mexico feed only mentioned Mexico time, while in the Panregional feed Colombia and Argentina times are mentioned.

On 7 October 2025, Paramount announced that Nickelodeon would end in Brazil on 31 December 2025. In Hispanic America, the channel will continue to operate due to the Hispanic American market having a high penetration of pay TV and being less reliant on cord-cutting than Brazil.

On 4 March 2026, Nickelodeon confirmed that the Panregional feed would be replaced by the Mexican feed by 8 April 2026 (whose feed began to gradually replace the Panregional feed on several pay TV services of the region in February of the same year), with all pay TV services in Latin America using that feed by then. However, the feeds unification was brought forward to 18 March 2026, when the Panregional feed was removed and merged with the Mexico feed in all pay TV services of the region. Since then, the channel has once again consisted of a single feed for the entire region as in its launch.

== Feeds ==
Nickelodeon Latin America was launched in 20 December 1996 with a one single feed for all the Latin American region with base in Mexico. In 2001, the feed were split, creating first the North feed (which covered Mexico, Colombia, Venezuela, Bolivia, Ecuador, Peru, Central America and the Caribbean), followed by the South feed (which covered Argentina, Chile, Uruguay and Paraguay). In November 2010, the Central feed was launched and it was based in Colombia, while the North feed became unique for Mexico as it became a separate feed. In Argentina and Uruguay, the DirecTV satellite operator broadcast the Central feed instead of the South feed.

On 1 April 2023, the South feed was merged with the Central feed, forming the Panregional feed. In Central America and Dominican Republic, the Sky satellite operator broadcast the Mexico feed instead of the Panregional feed. On 18 March 2026, the Panregional feed was merged with the Mexico feed into one single Panregional feed centered in Mexico City, broadcasting in Mexico, Argentina, Colombia, Chile, Venezuela, Peru, Ecuador, Bolivia, Paraguay, Uruguay, Costa Rica, Dominican Republic, El Salvador, Guatemala, Honduras, Nicaragua, Panama and the Caribbean.

== Events and media ==
=== Kids' Choice Awards ===
In 2010, Nickelodeon began to produce localized versions of the Nickelodeon Kids' Choice Awards for its Latin American markets; after a one-off event in 2003, the Nickelodeon Mexico Kids' Choice Awards were relaunched on 4 September 2010 at Six Flags México in Mexico City, hosted by Omar Chaparro and Anahí. The Nickelodeon Argentina Kids' Choice Awards then premiered in 2011, held on 11 October 2011 at Microestadio Malvinas Argentinas in Buenos Aires and hosted by Nicolás Vázquez. In 2014, the Nickelodeon Colombia Kids' Choice Awards debuted.

=== Revista Nick ===
Revista Nick (Nick Magazine) was launched on 27 November 2004 in Mexico, ending in April 2010, five months after the American version was ended due to the continued migration of network content to the internet.

=== Website ===
MundoNick.com was the name of the network's official website which launched in 1999. In 2020, MundoNick.com was closed in favor of a new site for the network called Nickelodeon.la.

== Nick Hits ==
Nick Hits
- Launched: July 4, 2009; 17 years ago
- Closed: April 5, 2010; 16 years ago
- Channel: Nickelodeon Latin America
- Origin: Latin America
- Format: 480i/576i (SDTV)
- Runtime: 8 Hours (approx.)
- Replaced by: Nick at Nite Latin America

Nick Hits was a programming block on Nickelodeon that ran from 4 July 2009 to 5 April 2010, which aired classic Nicktoons, it replaced Nick at Nite on weekends. All of the block's programs were added to the lineup of Nick at Nite.

== Sister channels ==
=== Nick Jr. ===
Nick Jr. logo

Nick Jr. is a cable television channel in Latin America owned by Paramount that was launched in July 2008 as a 24-hour channel aimed at preschool audience. Originally, it was a block on Nickelodeon from 1997 to 2017.

=== Nickelodeon HD/Nick 2 ===
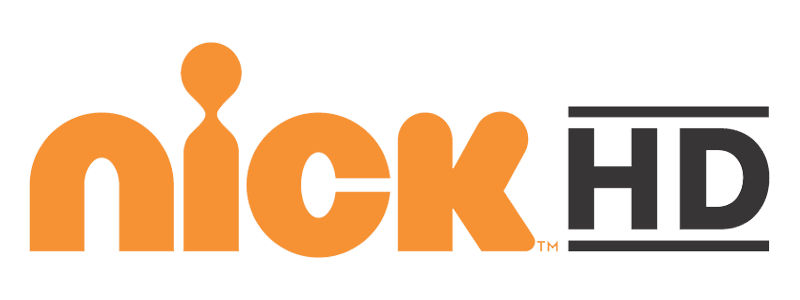
Nickelodeon HD logo (2011–2016)

In September 2010, MTV Networks Latin America announced new plans for 2011, one of them, the launching of Nickelodeon HD officially MTV Live HD. In May 2011, MTV Networks Latin America announced that the channel would launch on 1 June and would feature programming from the channel in HD. The HD channel launched on 1 June 2011, all over Latin America.

Nickelodeon HD starting simulcasting the main channel on 17 December 2015, and on 1 August 2016, the original HD channel was renamed Nick 2. It was replaced by the Latin American variant of TeenNick on 14 September 2020.

=== Nicktoons ===
On 29 January 2013, it was announced that a Nicktoons channel would launch in Latin America. It started airing on 4 February 2013 on television providers Cablevisión, Megacable and Cablecom. In September 2020, the channel was replaced by the American feed of NickMusic in many cable providers until the channel space was shut down in December 2020.

=== NickMusic ===
NickMusic logo

NickMusic started simulcasting their US feed on 1 September 2020, replacing VH1 MegaHits and Nicktoons in select Latin American countries. The first music video played on the channel was "Dynamite" by BTS. On 8 October 2025, Paramount announced that NickMusic would close in Latin America on 31 December 2025, due to the company's global restructuring policy.

=== TeenNick ===
TeenNick logo

TeenNick (formerly Nick 2) is a commercial-free secondary channel of Nickelodeon. It replaced Nick 2 on 14 September 2020. On 8 October 2025, Paramount announced that TeenNick would close along with Paramount Network, NickMusic and the MTV thematic channels (MTV 80s, MTV 00s, MTV Hits, MTV Live and Club MTV) in Latin America on 31 December 2025, due to the company's global restructuring policy.
