= Comedy Central (Brazil) =

Defunct Brazilian pay television channel (2012–2026)

- Final logo used from 26 February 2019 to 1 January 2026
- Broadcast area: Brazil
- Headquarters: São Paulo, Brazil

Programming
- Languages: Portuguese; English (via SAP)
- Picture format: 1080i HDTV (downscaled to 16:9 480i/576i for the SDTV feed)

Ownership
- Owner: Paramount Networks Americas
- Sister channels: Nickelodeon (Brazil); Nick Jr. (Brazil); MTV (Brazil)

History
- Launched: 1 February 2012; 14 years ago
- Closed: 1 January 2026; 8 months ago

Links
- Website: comedycentral.com.br

Comedy Central was a Brazilian pay television channel owned by Paramount Networks Americas. The channel was launched on 1 February 2012.

== History ==
In October 2011, VH1 began airing weekly programs in promotion for Comedy Central's then-upcoming launch featuring a "warm-up" for the channel's broadcast. The program was titled Comedy Central Apresenta, and comedian Danilo Gentili presented the stand-up shows with Brazilian comedians. The program was broadcast on VH1 periodically until the launch of Comedy Central.

On 11 November 2011, the website of the channel was launched, with The Roast of Charlie Sheen as an exclusive. The launch of the website featured actor Charlie Sheen and the comedian Danilo Gentili talking on Twitter regarding the then-upcoming launch of the channel in Brazil.

The channel's launch was originally scheduled for 1 January 2012, however, it was postponed, and they would announce on its social networks that the channel would instead launch on 1 February 2012.

Initially, the first pay television provider to inform customers was Claro TV, where the channel would replace the VH1 MegaHits channel, on channel 92, on 7 February 2012, six days after its launch. Sky also announced to its subscribers by email that it would replace VH1 MegaHits with Comedy Central. The channel was launched by the company on 1 February, the day of its launch and with a 12-day period where it was free to all customers. Both companies disclosed their channels only through the SD signal. The providers did not confirm the closure of the VH1 MegaHits channel in Brazil at the time, but the channel would remain available to other television providers that may not be available in its line-up. VH1 MegaHits would be discontinued in 2020, in favor of the expansion of MTV Live in Brazil.

On 7 October 2025, Paramount announced that Comedy Central would close in Brazil along with all its sister channels on 31 December 2025, due to high operational costs in the respective country, declining ratings of pay television in Brazil and the Brazilian pay TV crisis.

== Programming ==
Comedy Central Brazil logo from 2012 to 2019

The program The Daily Show featuring host Jon Stewart began to be shown with subtitles from its launch. The channel also aired comedy-oriented series and broadcast the South Park series, and programs from VH1 Brazil, which had been broadcast in the early mornings from 2019 until its closure.

The channel also produced its own productions from the American and Latin American version, such as Comedy Central Stand-Up, Comedy Central Apresenta, República do Stand-Up, A Culpa é do Cabral (which was one of the channel's most successful programs, lasting for thirteen seasons), A Culpa é da Carlota (canceled after the third season due to public review and specialized criticism) and others. The channel also partnered with Brazilian production company Porta dos Fundos for broadcast some of the group's projects and the webseries Homens? from 2019.

== See also ==
- Nickelodeon (Brazil)
- MTV (Brazil)
- Comedy Central (U.S.)
