= Nick Jr. (Brazil) =

Defunct Brazilian pay television channel (2008–2026)

Nick Jr. Brazil
- Broadcast area: Brazil
- Headquarters: São Paulo, Brazil

Programming
- Languages: Portuguese; English (via SAP)
- Picture format: 1080i HDTV (downscaled to 16:9/4:3 480i/576i for the SDTV feed)

Ownership
- Owner: Paramount Networks Americas
- Parent: Nickelodeon Group
- Sister channels: Nickelodeon (Brazil); MTV (Brazil); Comedy Central (Brazil)

History
- Launched: 1 July 2008; 18 years ago
- Closed: 1 January 2026; 8 months ago

Nick Jr. was a Brazilian pay television channel, owned by Paramount Networks Americas. The channel was aimed at a preschool audience. Historically, Sistema Brasileiro de Televisão, TV Evangelizar, TV Litoral, Netflix, Paramount+, Pluto TV, HBO Max, Amazon Prime Video and YouTube have served as the main Brazilian outlets for Nickelodeon and Nick Jr. programming under licensing agreements with Viacom.

== History ==
Nick Jr. was introduced in Brazil in the 1990s and early 2000s as a programming block airing on Nickelodeon's Brazilian channel. On 1 July 2008, Nick Jr. was launched as a channel in the country. Simultaneously, the VOD web service NickTurbo Jr. launched.

On 19 September 2023, the channel was delocalised and started to use some assets from EMEAA, in the same day as its Latin American counterpart. This change also replaced end credits with short credits, indicating the show's name, production company and year, similar to the Nickelodeon channels in EMEAA. However, it still retained some localization, such as advertisements, localised text on selected trailers, and opt-outs for local programming, such as Os Chocolix.

On 7 October 2025, Paramount announced that it would close all of its channels in Brazil (including Nick Jr.) on 31 December 2025, due to high operational costs in the respective country, declining ratings for pay television in Brazil and the Brazilian pay TV crisis. The final broadcast was "Power Tires", an episode from Blaze and the Monster Machines.

== Logos ==
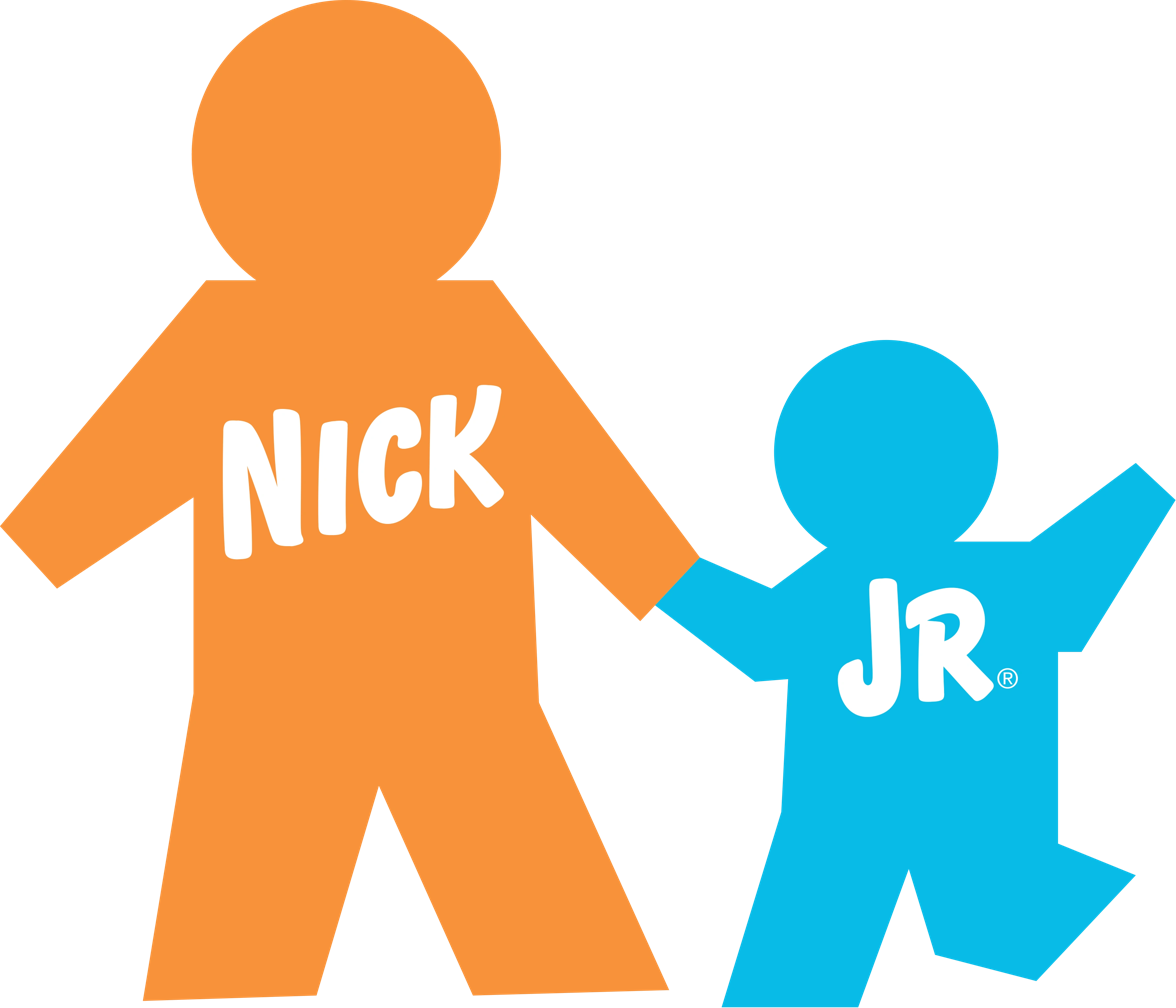
2008–2010

2010–2024

2024–2025
