= VH1 MegaHits =

Latin American TV channel

VH1 Megahits
- Final logo used from February 1, 2010 to August 31, 2020
- Country: Brazil
- Broadcast area: Argentina; Chile; Mexico
- Headquarters: Miami, Florida

Programming
- Language: English
- Picture format: 480i (4:3, SDTV)

Ownership
- Owner: ViacomCBS Networks Americas (ViacomCBS)
- Sister channels: MTV; Nickelodeon; Nick Jr. Paramount Network; Comedy Central; VH1; Telefe Internacional

History
- Launched: May 1, 2002 (United States); January 29, 2010 (test sign); February 1, 2010 (official launch) (Brazil, MTV Hits rebrand)
- Replaced: MTV Hits (Brazil)
- Closed: June 30, 2005 (United States); July 31, 2020 (Brazil); August 31, 2020 (Latin America)
- Replaced by: Logo TV (United States); MTV Live HD (Brazil); NickMusic (Latin America)

VH1 MegaHits was a Latin American pay television music channel. It was owned by ViacomCBS Networks Brazil, subsidiary of ViacomCBS Networks Americas and aired music videos throughout its entire day.

VH1 MegaHits featured four different blocks of programming: In Motion, Nothing But Classics, VH1 Shuffle and Moods. It was somewhat equivalent to MTV Hits in its programming style, though the latter also featured artists interviews and album/music video recording featurettes, whereas VH1 MegaHits was completely dependent on music videos.

The network launched as MTV Hits in Brazil on 22 June 2005, and was re-branded as VH1 MegaHits on 29 January 2010 after a local re-configuration of Viacom's domestic properties in Brazil.

In Brazil, by a decision of Viacom, the channel was replaced by MTV Live HD on 3 August 2020.

VH1 MegaHits had its signal switched off on 31 August 2020, one day after the broadcast of the 2020 MTV VMAs. As well as MTV Hits US, the channel was directly replaced by NickMusic on August 31, 2020. The last music video played on the channel was "Bulletproof" by La Roux.

== VH1 MegaHits in the United States ==
VH1 MegaHits USA logo (2001–2005)

VH1 MegaHits in the United States was a fully automated music video channel which played mostly top 40 adult contemporary videos from throughout VH1's history, from the '80s to the early years of the 21st century. It shared the same eight-hour automated loop schedule that VH1 Classic and VH1 Country also had at the time. As with its sister networks, it was exclusive to digital cable and never had any satellite service carriage.

Due to low viewership and cable carriage, the channel was discontinued at the end of June 2005. The satellite space was used by corporate parent MTV Networks to launch Logo, a subscription network targeted at the gay community. Logo TV previously aired two music video-based programs, NewNowNext Music and The Click List: Top 10 Videos.

== See also ==
- VH1 Brasil
- Logo, the successor of VH1 MegaHits in the United States
