= Logo TV =

American pay television channel

- Logo used since 2015
- Country: United States
- Broadcast area: Nationwide

Programming
- Language: English
- Picture format: 1080i HDTV (downscaled to letterboxed 480i for the SDTV feed)

Ownership
- Owner: Skydance Global Cable Media (Skydance)
- Parent: MTV Entertainment Group
- Sister channels: list of assets owned by Skydance

History
- Launched: June 30, 2005; 21 years ago
- Replaced: VH1 MegaHits

Links
- Website: logotv.com

Availability

Streaming media
- Service(s): FuboTV, Philo, Sling TV

Logo TV (often shortened to Logo) is an American basic cable channel owned by Skydance Global Cable Media, a division of Skydance. Launched in 2005, Logo was originally dedicated to lifestyle and entertainment programming targeting LGBTQ+ audiences. It replaced VH1 MegaHits in the United States.

The channel's availability peaked at 53.2 million US households in September 2013, but its cable and satellite carriage has steadily declined thereafter, decreasing to 21.7 million households by December 2023.

== History ==
The channel launched June 30, 2005, as the first ad-supported commercial television channel in the United States targeted towards the LGBTQ+ community. It was founded by former MTV executive Matt Farber. Its first president, Brian Graden, was named by Out as the 15th most powerful gay person in America in 2007. Logo replaced VH1 MegaHits when it was launched.

Logo TV wordmark used from 2005 to 2013

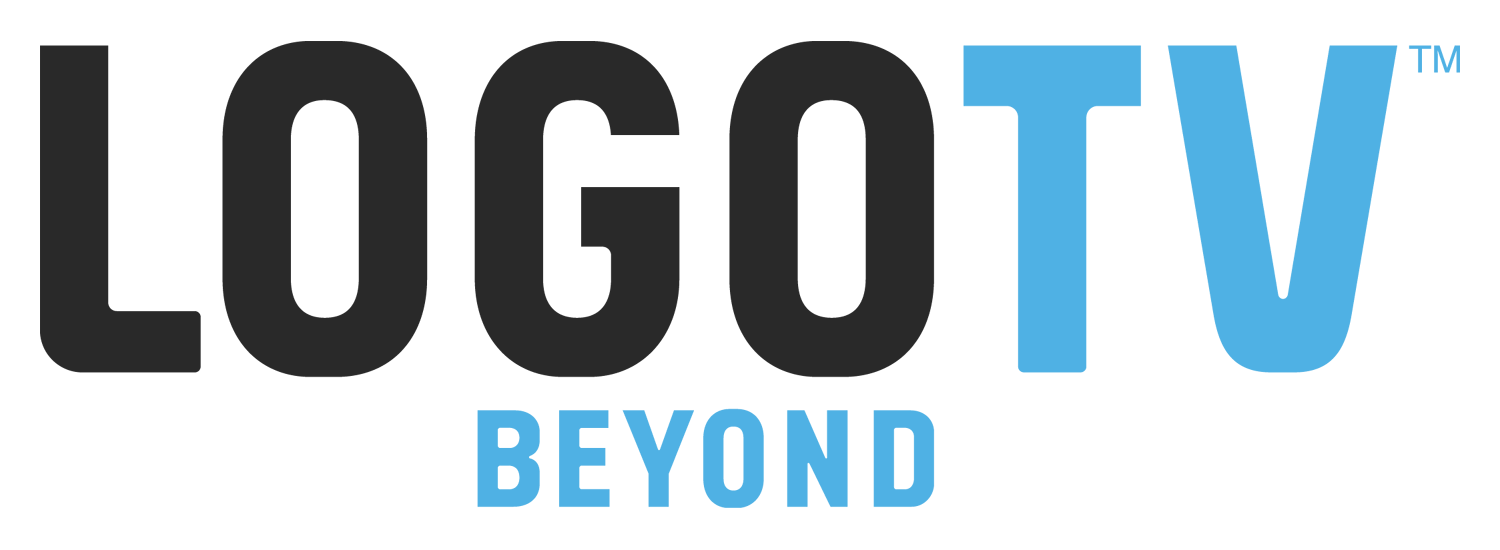
Logo TV logo (2013–2015)

The fact that the LGBTQ-themed channel was named "Logo" led some viewers to think the "l" and the "g" referenced "lesbian" and "gay", but according to company executives, the name does not represent anything, nor is it an acronym. The channel's website says:

We chose the name "Logo TV" because a logo is an identity and nothing's more important than having your own, unique identity, and making it work for you. Your logo is your symbol, it's what you put forward with pride, it's who you are, and it's what we are.

Logo struck carriage deals prior to its launch date with DirecTV, Charter Communications, Adelphia Communications Corporation, Cablevision, Time Warner Cable, and RCN Corporation. The broadcaster reached a deal with Comcast after the launch date. Logo also partnered at the time with CBS News to provide news briefs and had a marketing agreement with LPI Media, publisher of The Advocate, Out, and Out Traveler magazines. MTV Networks and Time Warner Cable announced an agreement on December 11, 2006, to expand its distribution of Logo to additional markets. Logo became available on Dish Network in May 2009 (in HD only) as part of an add-on package.

In April 2011, Logo acquired the rights to air the British comedy series Absolutely Fabulous and co-produced the show's three revival specials during 2011 and 2012 with the BBC and BBC America. Logo aired the episodes in a heavily edited format, while BBC America aired the episodes in its entirety.

The network announced on February 21, 2012, that it would change its programming strategy. Citing research that indicated that LGBTQ people were becoming increasingly less likely to prioritize highlighting their sexual orientation or identity, the channel entered into partnerships to produce programs that focused less on LGBTQ-specific interests and more on general cultural and lifestyle subjects.

Day-to-day operations were handled by Lisa Sherman, who was executive vice president and general manager until her resignation in October 2013. While the reach of the channel grew steadily in the United States during the early 2010s, increasing from 44.6 million pay television households in January 2010 to 53.2 million in September 2013, its carriage has steadily declined by being removed from various cable and streaming providers thereafter, decreasing its availability to 21.7 million households by December 2023.

== Programming ==
Logo's programming was initially a blend of movies, reality television, travel programming, dating and romance shows, documentaries, music videos, comedy, news, and syndicated programs that either had LGBTQ characters or were popular among LGBTQ viewers.

Since 2017, the network's main programming serves as a mostly rerun-focused channel similar to TV Land, airing older sitcoms from the 1970s to 1990s. As part of Viacom's 2017 restructuring plan, the network no longer produces any new programming outside of content for its social media pages. RuPaul's Drag Race moved to sister network VH1 that year, which later moved to MTV in 2023, with Logo now only airing reruns and simulcasts of the show and its spinoffs. Logo's schedule as of 2026 consists solely of repeats of RuPaul's Drag Race and related series, plus Mama's Family and Three's Company on Fridays and weekends.

Logo also previously operated a collection of websites under the LOGOonline umbrella name. NewNowNext, a pop culture news and trends blog, remained the only active website owned by the network until July 2022, when it was merged into Logo News; the URL now redirects to other company properties.

== See also ==
- List of United States cable and satellite television networks
