= Global Citizen (organization) =

International education and advocacy organization

Global Citizen logo

Global Citizen, also known as Global Poverty Project, is an international education and advocacy organization that seeks to catalyze the movement to end extreme poverty and promote social justice and equity through the lens of intersectionality. Based ultimately in New York City, the organization was originally founded in Australia by Hugh Evans, Michael Sheldrick, Simon Moss, and Wei Soo, and aims to increase the number and effectiveness of people taking action to support the cause.

== History ==
Global Citizen was founded in 2008 as the Global Poverty Project in Melbourne, Australia and has since opened additional offices in London, Berlin, Toronto, Lagos, and Johannesburg, and is now headquartered in Manhattan.

In 2012, Global Citizen began organizing the Global Citizen Festival as an annual concert event to promote charity initiatives and eliminating world hunger.

In July 2017, Global Citizen published its first accountability report for its education commitments. That same year, former Australian Prime Minister Julia Gillard also used the organization's platform to call for US$3.1 billion, to give 870 million children access to high-quality education via the organization she chairs, the Global Partnership for Education. Over 263,000 organization members sent tweets, emails, and messages to world leaders and corporations in support. In February 2018, donors pledged over $2.3 billion to the cause.

In April 2020, the organization partnered with Lady Gaga and her mother to produce a globally-televised and streamed concert called One World: Together at Home, featuring celebrities singing from their homes during the COVID-19 pandemic. The event raised $129.7 million for different charities, including the World Health Organization's COVID-19 Solidarity Response Fund. This was followed up in June with Global Goal: Unite for Our Future, a virtual event focused on highlighting the disproportionate impact of COVID-19 on marginalized communities.

As of July 2020, US$48.4 billion have been pledged to Global Citizen-supported causes, and there have been almost 25 million actions taken by its members. In 2020, Global Citizen won the Webby Award for Public Service and Activism in the category Apps, Mobile & Voice.
