= MTV (Brazilian TV channel) =

Brazilian pay television channel (2013–2026)

- Final logo used from 30 October 2021 to 1 January 2026
- Broadcast area: Brazil

Programming
- Picture format: 1080i HDTV (HD feed downgraded to letterboxed 480i for SDTV sets)

Ownership
- Owner: Paramount Networks Americas (Paramount Global)
- Sister channels: Nickelodeon (Brazil); Nick Jr. (Brazil); Comedy Central (Brazil)

History
- Launched: 1 October 2013; 13 years ago
- Replaced: MTV Brasil
- Closed: 1 January 2026; 10 months ago

Links
- Website: mtv.com.br

MTV was a Brazilian pay television channel owned by Paramount Networks Americas. The channel is the second Brazilian version of MTV after the free-to-air network MTV Brasil, launched in 1990, closed after Viacom acquired the MTV branding in Brazil from Grupo Abril. The channel launched at 9:30 pm BRT on 1 October 2013, with the program Coletivation.

Among the international versions of MTV regarding the amount of local programming, the Brazilian version was in second place, only behind its US channel in 2014. The channel reached approximately 12.6 million subscribers by 2014.

MTV channels in Brazil closed on 1 January 2026.

== History ==
=== Background ===
MTV first aired in Brazil after a partnership signed between its US parent Viacom and the Brazilian media group Abril. The channel launched on 20 October 1990, becoming the third version to be launched in the world (after MTV Europe and the original American channel) and, for over 20 years, was broadcast over-the-air nationwide, broadcasting from São Paulo, using the facilities Abril acquired from Rede Tupi. In 2009, Abril acquired the part of MTV Brasil's shares owned by Viacom, becoming the owner of the rights of the brand in the country through a licensing agreement. From 2010, however, the channel started having major financial problems, which aggravated in 2011. In early 2012, rumors regarding its possible shutdown began to be reported on the Brazilian press, which were initially criticized by its staff. On 29 July 2013, Viacom International Media Networks The Americas announced that it would reacquire the MTV brand in Brazil.

In order to differentiate from the previous MTV Brasil, the new channel opted to use the MTV nomenclature.

Grupo Abril, which agreed to sale the brand as part of a restructuring of its operations, kept its over-the-air network and MTV Brasil's UHF network was replaced by Xsports. By announcing the channel's launch, Viacom revealed the intent of covering 75% of the pay television subscriber base, which would represent a larger reach than the OTA network. It also announced that it would produce over 350 hours of national content by December 2014, with Brazilian versions of programs, such as MTV World Stage, Guy Code and Pranked, as well as daily programs, series, extreme sports and reality shows. None of the over-the-air channel's staff or technical team returned for the pay television channel in MTV's restructuring process. The first company that confirmed its availability was Sky, which started offering the channel from launch day on channel 86, replacing VH1. NET also carried the channel from launch, also replacing VH1 Brasil.

On 14 September 2013, MTV released its launch campaign, named "MTV Ask Mama", in which Mãe Dináh tried to predict the channel's future. The promos aired on the original MTV Brasil.

On 17 September 2013, MTV Brasil's former director of programming Zico Góes confirmed that all of the channel's programming archive would be transferred to Viacom. This archive featured 33,000 Betamax tapes, and only 10% of the content were present in digital format. Details on how Viacom and MTV would do with the archives were not confirmed, but it featured rare footage, including the first interview with Marcelo Bonfá and Dado Villa-Lobos after Renato Russo's death. Part of the archive, considered to be useless (such as recorded programming), was not given to Viacom and Góes aimed to make a documentary with the footage.

On 24 September 2013, a press conference was held to reveal the channel's line-up. The national programs included the magazine program Coletivation, presented by singer Fiuk and comedian Patrick Maia, reality-show Papito in Love, presented by singer Supla, and animated series Família do Zaralho, voiced by Felipe Xavier. MTV Sports, formerly seen on the original MTV Brasil, continued using the extant presenters. Among the international programs were South Park, MTV World Stage, Pranked, Ridiculousness, Awkward, Catfish and The Vampire Diaries. The music video slot was interactive and did not feature presenters, withdrawing the VJ function.

That MTV has no prejudice. We represent pop culture in Brazil and around the world, there are no restrictions. It's a very contemporary and very Brazilian version of MTV.

— Thiago Worcman.

One minute after the original MTV Brasil shut down at 11:59pm on 30 September 2013, MTV's signal on cable and satellite opened with the network's logo and the time in which it would launch. Later, the image was replaced by a promotional one with Mother Dináh filing her nails.

=== Launch ===
Shortly before launch, a countdown appeared and its premiere featured a glance at the programs shown on the channel. The first program to air on the pay television channel was the launch day edition of Coletivation. From the "old MTV" only MTV Hits launched alongside the channel's schedule. Later, more older programs were relaunched in new formats such as Acústico MTV, Top 20 Brasil, Beija Sapo and Luau MTV, with Viacom registering their brands.

On 17 March 2014, The Originals, spin-off of The Vampire Diaries, premiered on the channel.

=== End of local playout ===
As part of corporate restructuring, the channel's playout moved to a European server on 20 February 2024. This also happened to MTV Latinoamérica. As result, part of the programming and some of the channel's graphics changed. The signal switched during Tudão MTV.

=== Closure ===
On 7 October 2025, Paramount Skydance issued an statement announcing the shutdown of all linear television channels from its portfolio in Brazil. The decision affected MTV and its spin-off channels (MTV 00s and MTV Live), as well as sister channels Comedy Central, Nickelodeon, Nick Jr., and Paramount Network. The closures were scheduled for 31 December.

According to sources cited by NaTelinha, the closures were caused by declining ratings, a decrease in Brazilian pay television subscriptions, and the high operating costs associated with the Serviço de Acesso Condicionado (SeAC), Brazil's pay television regulatory system established under federal law. Other channels in Brazil (including the Disney-owned channels in Brazil in March 2025) had also closed for similar factors. Content from the channels continues to be available through Paramount's streaming services, Paramount+ and Pluto TV. This decision marked the definitive end of MTV as a linear television channel in Brazil, following its previous shutdown in 2013 after Grupo Abril terminated its licensing agreement with Viacom.

Before the official closure date, Claro TV+ removed MTV along with its sister channels on 29 December, replacing their programming with an informational slideshow.

The channel closed at 6:00 a.m. on 1 January 2026, with its final broadcast being an episode of Geordie Shore.

== Programming ==
=== Final programming ===
- Acústico MTV – television series showcasing musical artists based on the original American format MTV Unplugged.
- Beija Sapo
- De Férias com o Ex – reality television based on the original British format Ex on the Beach.
- De Férias com o Ex Caribe – reality television based on the original British format Ex on the Beach.
- Deu Positivo
- Drag Race Brasil – reality television based on the original American format RuPaul's Drag Race.
- MTV Hits – two-hour program which plays only chart hits.
- Rio Shore – reality television based on the original American format Jersey Shore.
- MTV Top 20

From other Viacom Media Networks properties:

- Ronald Rios Talk Show (from Comedy Central)

Award shows:

- MTV Millennial Awards Brazil

=== Former programming ===
- Adotada (2014–2017)
- Are You the One? Brasil (2015–2018)
- Batalha de Quiosques(2014)
- Cabelo Pantene (2017)
- Catfish Brasil (2016–2018)
- Clickbait (2017)
- Coletivation (2013–2014)
- Copa do Caos (2014)
- Deu Match! (2016–2018)
- Feras (2019)
- Móv3l (2015)
- MTVixe! (2019–2022)
- MTV Elektronique (2015)
- MTV Sports Apresenta: Deco e Lucas na Rota Explosiva (2014)
- Música.doc (2015)
- Papito in Love (2013–2015)
- Perrengue (2017)
- Pimpa Meu Feed (2020–2021)
- Pocket MTV (2013–2016)
- Ridículos (2016–2017)
- Trampo Zika (2019)

== Hosts ==
- Ana Flávia Bastos (2015)
- Becca Pires (2018–2020)
- Bia Coelho (2020–2022)
- Bruna Louise (2021)
- Caio Castro (2018)
- Cauê Moura (2017)
- Ciro Sales (2016–2018)
- Deco Neves (2014)
- Eléa Mercurio (2014)
- Ellen Milgrau (2016–2017)
- Erick Krominski (2023–2025)
- Felipe Titto (2015–2017)
- Fernanda Pineda (2022)
- Fiuk (2013)
- Gabi Lopes (2021)
- Gabi Prado (2019–2020)
- Grag Queen (2023–2025)
- Gui Araújo (2019–2021)
- Hugo Gloss (2016–2017)
- Ingrid Ohara (2021–2022)
- José Trassi (2015)
- Kéfera Buchmann (2014)
- Laurent F (2015)
- Leo David (2023–2025)
- Leo Picon (2019–2020)
- Lipe Ribeiro (2021–2022)
- Lucas Maciel (2019)
- Lucas Stegmann (2014)
- Luitha Miraglia (2015–2017)
- Maria Eugênia Suconic (2013–2021)
- Mariana Nery (2019–2021)
- Matheus Mazzafera (2020)
- Mayara Lepre (2013–2014)
- Michelli Provensi (2015, 2017–2019)
- Olavo Junqueira (2019–2021)
- Patrick Maia (2013–2014)
- Paulo Chun (2013–2015)
- Primo Preto (2015)
- Raphael Dumaresq (2022)
- Ricardo Gadelha (2016–2018)
- Spartakus Santiago (2021–2022)
- Ste Viegas (2020)
- Talita Alves (2013–2014)
- Valentina Bandeira (2023–2025)
