= Nickelodeon (Brazil) =

Defunct Brazilian pay television channel (1996–2026)

Nickelodeon Brazil
- Final logo used from 29 August 2023 to 1 January 2026 (Note: The logo's wordmark had been in use from 5 April 2010 to 1 January 2026. Additionally, this logo was a variant meant to be used for white backgrounds; the main variant had a white wordmark in conjunction with a fully orange splat.)
- Country: Brazil
- Headquarters: São Paulo, Brazil

Programming
- Languages: Portuguese; English (via SAP)
- Picture format: 1080i HDTV (downscaled to 480i for the SD feed)

Ownership
- Owner: Paramount Networks Americas (Paramount Skydance Corporation)
- Parent: Nickelodeon Group
- Sister channels: Nick Jr. (Brazil); MTV (Brazil); Comedy Central (Brazil)

History
- Launched: 20 December 1996; 29 years ago
- Closed: 1 January 2026; 10 months ago

Nickelodeon was a Brazilian children's pay television channel. It was launched in 1996 as a standalone feed of Nickelodeon Latin America in Portuguese with its own programming and series.

== History ==
Nickelodeon Brazil was launched on 20 December 1996, as a child-oriented channel, being the main competitor of Cartoon Network, which was launched three years earlier. On 1 October 1997, it launched on NET-Multicanal with 80% of the programming in Portuguese and the remaining 20% in English. This was following one of the conclusions by the focus group, which opted for content in English rather than dubbed in Spanish. The channel was not affected by the 1997 dubbers' strike, as most of its content was already dubbed in advance.

On 13 February 2006, Nick at Nite was launched in Brazil, and aired on weeknights from 10 pm to 6 am.

On 4 June 2007, the channel launched "Nickers", a live-action show with two hosts introducing shows and music. It followed the same concept and was similar to Disney Channel's Zapping Zone. The block was discontinued on all feeds in December 2008. Also in 2008, a Nick Jr. channel was launched, previously a programming block on Nickelodeon.

In 2009, a new segment called Nick Hits, which aired classic Nicktoons, replaced Nick at Nite on weekends. On 5 April 2010, Nickelodeon Brazil was rebranded to match with other Nickelodeon networks around the world at the time. Also, Nick Hits was removed and classic Nicktoons seen on the block became part of Nick at Nite.

In August 2010, Nickelodeon started to rerun the animated series Avatar: The Last Airbender to promote the film The Last Airbender, with this, a new on-air logo showed when the series was airing, an arrow blurring takes on or off in the Nickelodeon logo.

On 1 January 2015, the Nick at Nite block was discontinued.

On 17 October 2023, Nickelodeon Brazil delocalised and started to use some assets from EMEAA. Trailers became textless and end credits were replaced with short credits along with dubbing credits. However, it still retained some localization, such as advertisements, localised text on selected trailers, and opt-outs for local programming.

=== Closure ===
On 7 October 2025, Paramount announced that all of its networks, including Nickelodeon, would close in Brazil on 31 December 2025, due to high operational costs in the respective country, declining ratings for pay television in Brazil and the Brazilian pay TV crisis.

Before the official closing date, Claro TV+ removed Nickelodeon during an episode of SpongeBob SquarePants, along with its sister channels on 29 December, replacing their programming with an informational slideshow. The said show's episode "BassWard" was the final program of the channel before it was officially shut down on 1 January 2026.

== Ratings ==
In 2011, IBOPE reported that Nickelodeon Brasil ranked seventh among cable channels in total daily viewership, with an average audience of 71,000 viewers in Brazil. In March 2013, IBOPE released a new list of the most watched channels of cable television, which recorded an increases of position for the channel, but a significant increase in viewers, with 95,000 viewers.

== Logos ==
1996–2010

2010–2025

2023–2026

== See also ==
- Nick Jr. (Brazil)
- MTV (Brazil)
- Comedy Central (Brazil)
