= Nick Jr. (Latin America) =

Latin American variant of Nick Jr.

- Logo used since February 5, 2024
- Broadcast area: Hispanic America; Caribbean

Programming
- Languages: Spanish; English (via SAP)
- Picture format: 1080i HDTV (downscaled to 16:9/4:3 480i/576i for the SDTV feeds)

Ownership
- Owner: Skydance Latin America and Caribbean
- Parent: Nickelodeon Group
- Sister channels: Nickelodeon; MTV; Comedy Central

History
- Launched: July 1, 2008; 18 years ago

Links
- Website: la.nickjr.tv

Nick Jr. is a cable television channel in Latin America owned by Skydance Corporation subsidiary Skydance Latin America and Caribbean based on the American television channel of the same name. The channel is aimed at a preschool audience.

Currently, the Nick Jr. channel features the same programming as the Nick Jr. block on Nickelodeon, as well as some shows previously seen on the block, such as Team Umizoomi and Bubble Guppies.

== History ==
The block was first introduced in the 1990s and early 2000s as a programming block airing on Nickelodeon's Latin American channel. On July 1, 2008, Nick Jr. was launched as a channel in the region.

On September 19, 2023, Nick Jr. delocalised and started to use some assets from EMEAA. This change also replaced end credits with short credits, indicating the show's name, production company and year, similar to the Nickelodeon channels in EMEAA. However, it is still retaining some localization, such as advertisements, localised text on selected trailers, and opt-outs for local programming.

On October 7, 2025, Paramount announced that Nick Jr. would end in Brazil on December 31, 2025. In Hispanic America, the channel will continue to operate.

== Logos ==
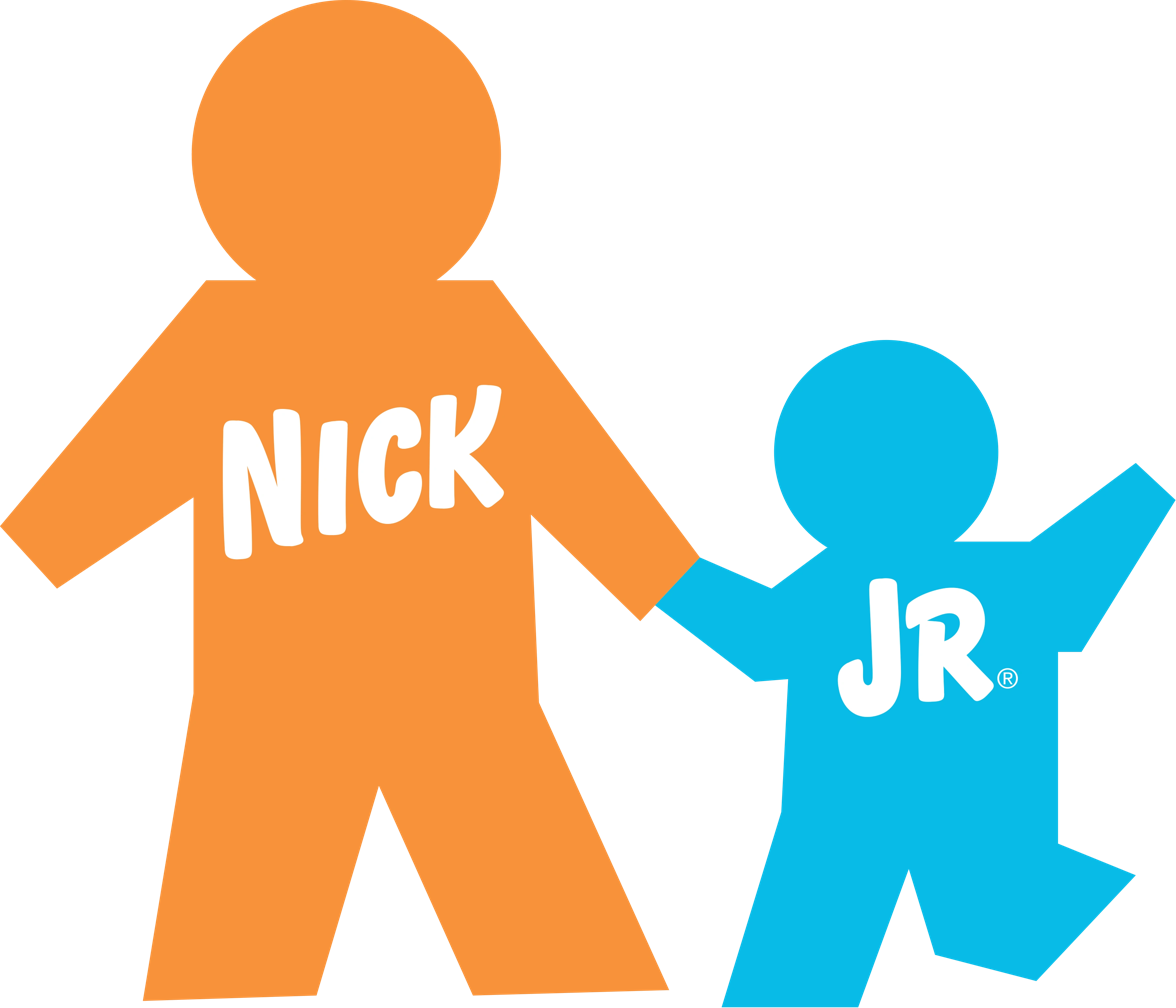
2008-2010

2010-2024

2024-present
