= MTV (Latin America) =

Latin American pay television channel

MTV Latin America
- Logo used since 30 October 2021
- Broadcast area: Hispanic America; Caribbean

Programming
- Picture format: 1080i HDTV (downscaled to 16:9 480i/576i for the SDTV feed)

Ownership
- Owner: Skydance Latin America and Caribbean
- Sister channels: Nickelodeon; Nick Jr. Comedy Central

History
- Launched: 1988 (block, MTV International); 1 October 1993 (channel)
- Closed: c. 1993 (block)

Availability

Terrestrial
- Antina (Argentina): Channel 74

MTV is a Latin American pay television network that was launched on October 1, 1993, as the Hispanic American counterpart of the American channel MTV. It is owned by Skydance Latin America and Caribbean, a subsidiary of Skydance Corporation.

The channel broadcasts music videos as well as reality series, scripted programming, and films, many of which are directly or indirectly related to music and youth culture. Its programming has historically focused on various musical genres, including pop, rock, reggaeton, hip-hop, trap, electronic music, and K-pop.

The network has produced localized versions of several MTV reality programs, such as Acapulco Shore. Unlike its U.S. counterpart, profanity is generally not censored in most Latin American countries, particularly during watershed hours. The first music video broadcast on the channel was "We Are Sudamerican Rockers" by the Chilean band Los Prisioneros.

== History ==
A few important events in the late 1980s led to the creation of MTV Latin America. Firstly, the program "MTV International" was created in 1988, produced at MTV's facilities in New York and led by Daisy Fuentes. This weekly program was broadcast through Latin American and American channels and presented music videos from both regions. A second catalyst was the rise of the "Spanish Rock fever", which included artists such as Argentine rockers Miguel Mateos and Soda Stereo.

Lastly, during these years the first-ever Spanish rock concert in the US was put on by Miguel Mateos, which created excitement amongst Latino communities in the United States. In its launch year, it was sold to television stations in eleven Latin American countries, whereas in the United States, it aired on Telemundo. It had led the ratings in its timeslot in Ecuador and had agreements with FM stations to carry a simulcast of the program due to sound problems in television sets in Latin America at the time.

With the growing popularity of Latino artists, channel executives began to take notice and realized the increasing quality and popularity of music sung in Spanish. After considering the success of other international MTV channels, such as MTV Europe and MTV Brasil. In the late 1980s, Viacom approached Televisa with a proposal to establish a franchise or partnership to launch the Spanish-language MTV brand in Mexico and the broader region. Emilio Azcárraga Milmo rejected the offer, citing his opposition to arrangements that would involve shared control or external interference in his businesses.

MTV Networks eventually launched MTV (Latin America) independently in October 1993. The channel operated with a single feed broadcast across Latin America. Its programming was produced and recorded in Miami, Florida, where its studios were located. Daisy Fuentes was among the channel’s first video jockeys (VJs). Beto González, from Guatemala, oversaw MTV’s media and advertising operations from 1994 to 1999, after which he was succeeded by Gus Rodríguez of Mexico.

MTV (Latin America) logo used from 1993 to 2011.

MTV (Latin America) logo used from 2011 to October 2021 in North feed and November 2021 in South feed.

As the channel began to experience growing popularity in the early part of 1995, new shows were added to the program. For the first time, shows unrelated to music were broadcast, such as Beavis and Butthead. MTV News was added, a segment dedicated to news on celebrities, film, politics and social issues, usually combining subjective and objective commentary. Lastly, in this same year the show Conexion was launched, the most popular show in the channel's history, which has remained on air for a record length of time and boasts the largest audience of any program in the history of the channel.

Given the channel's social and economic growth, in August 1996 "MTV Latin America" was divided into two regional signals, "North", covering Mexico, Central America, Colombia and Venezuela, and "South", covering Argentina and the rest of the region. This division was created in order to cater programming more closely to distinct audiences. As a result, in 1996 MTV became the number one music channel in Latin America. The channel also became one of the first US television brands to develop a website for Latin America audiences with the launch MTVLA.com in partnership with the Miami-based company Internet Marketing Consultants.

However, during 1999 the channel began experiencing problems. The musical aspect of "MTV Latin America" was disorganized and the channel was having trouble catering to distinct regional tastes. Executives decided to segment audiences by dividing the channel into two signals: "MTV Mexico" and "MTV Argentina", with studios and regional offices located in capital cities of each country.

During this time, the channel began to show American MTV programs subtitled in Spanish. As well, in the year 2000, MTV created a new signal directed towards Chile, known as "MTV Southwest", which repeated programming from MTV Mexico but adjusted to Chilean time. While at first MTV thought about repeating MTV Argentina's programming for the Chilean signal because of the proximity of the countries, it was decided that considering cultural traits and the difference in accents between Chilean and Argentine Spanish, it would be more suitable to adapt Mexican programming for the Chilean signal. However, late 2002, MTV Southwest was cancelled due to the low number of viewers changing to "MTV Central" following in Chile. In 2004, it closed "MTV Central" due to the launch of VH1 Latin America. In 2005, it returned "MTV Central" directed towards Colombia.

Since 2009, MTV has started to lose hours of music videos in the programming being replaced by more reality shows, this change is still in "MTV North". In February 2018, "MTV South" it bases most of its programming on music videos, up to 18 hours daily, leaving reality shows that are broadcast on the other feed only airing on primetime. In 2021, it closed "MTV Central" and merged with ''MTV North''. Since then, two signals have been operating in Latin America: "MTV North", covering Mexico, Colombia, Peru, Ecuador, Bolivia and Central American and Caribbean countries, and "MTV South", covering Argentina, Chile, Venezuela, Paraguay and Uruguay. On June 26, 2023, both feeds were merged into a single pan-regional feed centered in Mexico City, in addition, music on "MTV South" was reduced from 17 to 7 hours. The channel switched to EMEAA playout on February 20, 2024.

On October 7, 2025, Paramount announced that MTV would end in Brazil on December 31, 2025. In Hispanic America, the channel will continue to operate.

== Feeds ==
MTV Latin America was divided North and South feeds, from August 1996 to June 26, 2023, when both feeds merged into one single Panregional feed centered in Mexico City, broadcasting in Mexico, Argentina, Colombia, Chile, Venezuela, Peru, Ecuador, Bolivia, Paraguay, Uruguay, Costa Rica, Dominican Republic, El Salvador, Guatemala, Honduras, Nicaragua, and Panama.

== Social issues and MTV ==
In addition to broadcasting core MTV programs, MTV Latin America has also produced other non-music-related programs that address social and cultural issues that impact Latin American youth. These programs address issues such as politics, sexually transmitted infections, the environment and sexuality. Some of these shows include:

- Speak out: We are 30 million – Mexican Elections of 2006 (a series promoting the participation of youth in the Presidential elections, and included interviews with each of the candidates)
- Xpress (an award-winning documentary on the killing of women in Juarez City, Chihuahua, Mexico)
- Staying Alive (a co-production with CNN covering the worldwide HIV/AIDS epidemic)

== Other projects ==
In 2002, MTV Networks announced the first Latin American MTV Video Music Awards. For the first three years, the awards were held in Miami. In 2006 and 2007 they were held in Mexico City. In 2008, the Awards were moved to Guadalajara, Mexico. In 2009, the show took place in various cities, including Bogotá, Buenos Aires, Mexico City and Los Angeles. In 2013, was replaced by MTV Millennial Awards.

== Audience demographics ==
The majority of viewers are between the ages of 14 and 34. The average age of viewers is 18 years, with the majority of the audience being older. About 76% of viewers belong to the middle to upper class. As well, the channel notes a large number of viewers are university students. Moreover, according to a study conducted by TGI Latina in 2004, MTV Latin America's audience is 57% male and 43% female.

== Public reception ==
MTV Latin America, like other MTV channels around the world, has been one of the first television channels to receive criticisms, largely from their own viewers. While many criticisms apply to MTV as a whole, some criticisms apply specifically to MTV Latin America. One reason for these criticisms is that certain videos and reality shows on MTV Latin America are not censored.

One of the main criticisms against MTV Latin America is that it is merely a commercial channel, whose broadcasting of videos is based on only economic interests and not on audience requests. MTV has been accused of being excessively commercial and an advertising tool for major music corporations. MTV has undermined the importance of the music itself, replacing it with merely a visual esthetic. This creates a negative public image for MTV.

As well, MTV has recently been criticized for broadcasting too many reality shows, distancing itself from its original purpose, which was to broadcast musical programming. MTV has argued that these shows include music from current artists in their soundtrack, such as Laguna Beach. This show in particular has caused great controversy among viewers as it offers content completely unrelated to music.

Another criticism against MTV is that the channel spreads and promotes inappropriate behaviour among youth, in both music videos and shows. Some controversial content include sex, early pregnancy, general violence, use of drugs, daily drinking and smoking habits of celebrities and domestic violence.

A final criticism, exclusive to MTV Latin America, relates to the form in which titles are presented on the screen, which usually includes a variety of orthographical errors such as missing accents and use of exclamation and question marks. Critics argue that these errors do not aid in didactic learning for viewers, the majority of which are youth.

However, MTV Latin America has also made many positive achievements. Between 2005 and 2006, MTV broadcast a campaign entitled "Don't Kill the Music", which aimed to broadcast a message of awareness to youth about music in general. As well the channel has created various projects to help independent Hispanic bands and musical artists.

== See also ==
- List of MTV Latin America VJs
