= Comedy Central (Latin America) =

Latin American TV channel owned by Paramount

- Logo used since 26 February 2019
- Broadcast area: Hispanic America; Caribbean

Programming
- Picture format: 1080i HDTV (downscaled to 16:9 480i/576i for the SDTV feed)

Ownership
- Owner: Skydance Latin America and Caribbean
- Sister channels: MTV; Nickelodeon; Nick Jr.

History
- Launched: February 1, 2012

Links
- Website: comedycentral.la

Availability

Terrestrial
- SKYAmericas TV: Channel 128

Comedy Central is a Latin American pay television channel, owned by Skydance Latin America and Caribbean. It was launched on February 1, 2012.

== History ==
Comedy Central Latin America logo from 2012 to 2019

Before Comedy Central was launched in Latin America MTV and VH1 aired Comedy Central programming back in the 2000s to 2012, like South Park or Drawn Together.

The channel was launched on 1 February 2012 by Viacom International Media Networks The Americas and its website was launched on 11 November 2011, two months before the official start of the channel.

On 26 February 2019, U.S. network rebranded its logo and graphic package, adapting to the new redesign launched two months ago in the United States.

Since 6 June 2024, the channel is managed and transferred to Europe by the hand of CBS Networks Television Inc..

On 7 October 2025, Paramount announced that Comedy Central would end in Brazil on 31 December 2025. In Hispanic America, the channel will continue to operate.

== Feeds ==
In Latin America, Comedy Central has three different programming schedules for each of its feeds, which are Panregional feed (Northern and Southern feeds merged on 26 March 2023).
