= List of Brazilian films of 2014 =

This is a list of Brazilian films scheduled for theater release in 2014.

Title	Director	Cast (subject of documentary)	Genre	Notes	Release date
The Adventures of the Red Airplane	Frederico Pinto, José Maia	Pedro Yan, Milton Gonçalves, Lázaro Ramos	Animation		December 11
Alemão	José Eduardo Belmonte	Antônio Fagundes, Cauã Reymond, Caio Blat, Gabriel Braga Nunes, Marcello Melo Jr, Milhem Cortaz	Action	Downtown Filmes	March 13
Amazonia	Thierry Ragobert		Adventure		June 26
Amazônia Eterna	Belisario Franca		Documentary		June 5
Os Amigos	Lina Chemie	Marco Ricca, Dira Paes, Caio Blat	Drama	Imovision	November 27
Aos Ventos que Virão	Hermano Penna	Rui Ricardo Diaz, Emanuelle Araújo, Marat Descartes	Drama		July 24
Até que a Sbórnia nos Separe	Otto Guerra, Ennio Torresan Jr	Hique Gomez, Nico Nicolaiewsky, Otto Guerra, André Abujamra	Animation		October 30
Avanti Popolo	Michael Wahrmann	André Gatti, Carlos Reichenbach, Eduardo Valente	Drama	Vitrine Filmes	June 5
Between Valleys	Philippe Barcinski	Melissa Vettore, Ângelo Antônio, Daniel Hendler	Drama	Imovision	May 8
Boa Sorte	Carolina Jabor	Deborah Secco, João Pedro Zappa	Drama	Imagem Filmes	November 27
The Boy and the World	Alê Abreu	Vinicius Garcia, Lu Horta, Marco Aurélio Campos	Animated	Espaço Filmes	January 17
O Candidato Honesto	Roberto Santucci	Leandro Hassum, Luiza Valdetaro, Victor Leal	Comedy	Downtown Filmes; Paris Filmes	October 2
Os Caras de Pau em O Misterioso Roubo do Anel	Felipe Joffily	Leandro Hassum, Marcius Melhem, Christine Fernandes	Comedy	Imagem Filmes	December 25
Causa e Efeito	André Marouco	Maurycio Madruga, Matheus Prestes	Drama	Downtown Filmes; Paris Filmes	July 3
Chess Game	Luis Antonio Pereira	Priscila Fantin, Carla Marins, Antonio Calloni, Salvatore Giuliano	Thriller	Elo Company	March 20
Confia em Mim	Michel Tikhomiroff	Mateus Solano, Fernanda Machado	Thriller	Downtown Filmes	March 28
Confissões de Adolescente	Daniel Filho, Cris D'Amato	Sophia Abrahão, Bella Camero, Malu Rodrigues, Clara Tiezzi, Cássio Gabus Mendes	Comedy	Columbia Pictures	January 10
Copa de Elite	Victor Brandt	Marcos Veras, Júlia Rabello, Rafinha Bastos, Anitta	Comedy	20th Century Fox	March 17
De Menor	Caru Alves de Souza	Rita Batata, Giovanni Gallo, Caco Ciocler	Drama	Espaço Filmes	September 4
Os Dias Com Ele	Maria Clara Escobar		Documentary	Vitrine Filmes	April 24
Do Lado de Fora	Alexandre Carvalho	André Bankoff, Marcello Airoldi, Luis Fernando Vaz, Mauricio Evanns	Comedy	Elo Company	May 15
Dominguinhos	Mariana Aydar, Eduardo Nazarian, Joaquim Castro	Dominguinhos, Nana Caymmi, Gilberto Gil	Documentary		May 22
Em Busca de Iara	Flavio Frederico		Documentary	Kinoscópio	March 27
Entre Nós	Paulo Morelli, Pedro Morelli	Júlio Andrade, Caio Blat, Carolina Dieckmann, Martha Nowill, Maria Ribeiro, Lee Taylor, Paulo Vilhena	Drama	Downtown Filmes	March 27
Esse Viver Ninguém Me Tira	Caco Ciocler		Documentary		December 11
Estação Liberdade	Caíto Ortiz	Cauê Ito, Fabiula Nascimento, Carolina Sudati, Kentaro Inoue, Paulo Tsuchiya, Eduardo Chagas, Renata Sayuri	Drama	Elo Company	August 14
A Farra do Circo	Roberto Berliner, Pedro Bronz		Documentary		May 29
Gata Velha Ainda Mia	Rafael Primot	Regina Duarte, Bárbara Paz, Gilda Nomacce	Drama, thriller	Polifilmes	May 15
Getúlio	João Jardim	Alexandre Borges, Tony Ramos, Leonardo Medeiros, Fernando Luís, Drica Moraes	Biographical Drama	Europa Filmes	May 1
A Grande Vitória	Stefano Capuzzi	Caio Castro, Sabrina Sato, Suzana Pires, Moacyr Franco	Sports drama	Downtown Filmes	May 8
The Great Kilapy	Zézé Gamboa	Lázaro Ramos	Comedy-drama	Imovision	April
Harmonica's Howl	Bruno Safadi	Leandra Leal, Mariana Ximenes, Jiddu Pinheiro	Drama	ArtHouse	August
Os Homens São de Marte... E é pra Lá que Eu Vou!	Marcus Baldini	Mônica Martelli, Paulo Gustavo, Daniele Valente, Marcos Palmeira	Comedy	Downtown Filmes	May 29
Insônia	Beto Souza	Luana Piovani, Lara Rodrigues, Daniel Kusnieka	Romantic comedy	Espaço Filmes	February 14
Irmã Dulce	Vicente Amorim	Bianca Comparato, Regina Braga, Glória Pires	Biographical, drama	Downtown Filmes	November 27
Isolados	Tomas Portella	Bruno Gagliasso, Regiane Alves, José Wilker	Thriller	Downtown Filmes	September 18
Jogo das Decapitações	Sergio Bianchi	Fernando Alves Pinto, Silvio Guindane, Clarisse Abujamra	Drama		June 19
Julio Sumiu	Roberto Berliner	Lília Cabral, Carolina Dieckmann, Leandro Firmino, Fiuk	Comedy	Imagem Filmes	April 17
La Playa DC	Juan Andrés Arango	Luis Carlos Guevara, Jamés Solís, Andrés Murillo	Drama	Tucumán	March 27
Latitudes	Felipe Braga	Alice Braga, Daniel de Oliveira	Romance	O2 Play	February 28
Made in China	Estevão Ciavatta Pantoja	Regina Casé, Juliana Alves, Otávio Augusto	Comedy	H2O Films	November 6
The Man of the Crowd	Marcelo Gomes, Cao Guimarães	Paulo André, Silvia Lourenço	Drama		July 31
Mar Negro	Rodrigo Aragão	Walderrama dos Santos, Mayra Alarcón, Cristian Verardi, Tiago Ferrir, Kika Oliveira	Horror	Petrini Filmes	January 10
O Menino no Espelho	Guilherme Fiúza Zenha	Lino Facioli, Mateus Solano, Regiane Alves	Adventure	Downtown Filmes	June 19
Meninos de Kichute	Luca Amberg	Werner Schünemann, Arlete Salles, Viviane Pasmanter, Lucas Alexandre	Drama		June 5
Muita Calma Nessa Hora 2	Felipe Joffily	Bruno Mazzeo, Marcelo Adnet, Fernanda Souza, Andréia Horta	Comedy	Downtown Filmes	January 17
Na Quebrada	Fernando Grostein Andrade	Jean Luis Amorim, Claudio Jaborandy, Emanuelle Araújo	Drama	Downtown Filmes	October 16
A Noite da Virada	Fábio Mendonça	Luana Piovani, Marcos Palmeira, Júlia Rabello	Comedy	Paris Filmes	December 18
A Oeste do Fim do Mundo	Paulo Nascimento	César Troncoso, Nelson Diniz, Fernanda Moro	Drama	Espaço Filmes	August 28
Olho Nu	Joel Pizzini	Ney Matogrosso	Documentary		May 15
A Onda da Vida - Uma História de Amor & Surf	José Augusto Muleta, Raphael Gasparini	Caio Vaz, Guilherme de Souza, Omar Docena	Adventure		July 3
Operários da Bola	Virna Smith		Documentary		May 15
Past Minutes	Caio Sóh	Vladimir Brichta, Paulo Moska, Otávio Muller	Comedy	H2O Films	March 20
Pau Brasil	Fernando Belens	Bertrand Duarte, Osvaldo Mil, Fernanda Paquelet, Arany Santana	Drama	Caliban Cinema e Conteúdo	April 24
A Pelada	Damien Chemin	Kika Farias, Bruno Pêgo, Tuca Andrada, Karen Junqueira	Comedy	Downtown Filmes	August 7
The Pilgrim	Daniel Augusto	Júlio Andrade, Ravel Andrade, Fabíula Nascimento, Fabiana Guglielmetti and Lucci Ferreira	Biographical Drama	Columbia Pictures	August 14
Praia do Futuro	Karim Ainouz	Wagner Moura, Clemens Schick, Jesuita Barbosa	Drama	California Filmes	May 1
A Primeira Missa ou Tristes Tropeços, Enganos e Urucum	Ana Carolina	Alessandra Maestrini, Oscar Magrini, Dagoberto Feliz	Comedy		May 29
Quando Eu Era Vivo	Marco Dutra	Antônio Fagundes, Marat Descartes, Sandy Leah, Gilda Nomacce	Drama, thriller	Vitrine Filmes	January 31
Rio Belongs to Us	Ricardo Pretti	Leandra Leal, Mariana Ximenes, Jiddu Pinheiro	Drama, thriller	ArtHouse	August
Riocorrente	Paulo Sacramento	Simone Iliescu, Lee Taylor, Roberto Audio, Vinicius Dos Anjos	Drama	California Filmes	April 10
Rio, Eu Te Amo	Stephan Elliott, Fernando Meirelles, José Padilha, Paolo Sorrentino, Andrucha Waddington, Vicente Amorim, Guillermo Arriaga, Im Sang-soo, Nadine Labaki, Carlos Saldanha	Rodrigo Santoro, Cleo Pires, Wagner Moura, Fernanda Montenegro, Vincent Cassel, Ryan Kwanten, Emily Mortimer	Romance	Warner Bros.	September 11
O Segredo dos Diamantes	Helvécio Ratton	Matheus Abreu, Dira Paes, Alberto Gouvêa	Adventure, family	Espaço Filmes	December 18
Sementes do Nosso Quintal	Fernanda Heinz Figueiredo		Documentary		May 8
O Senhor do Labirinto	Geraldo Motta Filho, Gisella de Mello	Flavio Bauraqui, Maria Flor, Irandhir Santos	Biographical drama		December 11
Setenta	Emilia Silveira		Documentary		May 29
S.O.S. Mulheres ao Mar	Cris D'Amato	Giovanna Antonelli, Reynaldo Gianecchini, Fabíula Nascimento, Marcelo Airoldi, Emanuelle Araújo	Comedy	Buena Vista International	March 20
They'll Come Back	Marcelo Lordello	Maria Luiza Tavares, Geórgio Kokkosi, Elayne de Moura, Mauricéia Conceição	Drama	Vitrine Filmes	March 7
Tim Maia	Mauro Lima	Robson Nunes, Babu Santana, Alinne Moraes, Cauã Reymond	Biographical Drama	Downtown Filmes	October 30
Trinta	Paulo Machline	Matheus Nachtergaele, Paolla Oliveira, Milhem Cortaz	Biographical, drama	Fox Filmes	November 13
Vestido pra Casar	Gerson Sanginitto	Leandro Hassum, Fernanda Rodrigues, Renata Dominguez	Comedy		August 7
The Way He Looks	Daniel Ribeiro	Guilherme Lobo, Fabio Audi, Tess Amorim	Drama	Vitrine Filmes	April 10
A Wolf at the Door	Fernando Coimbra	Leandra Leal, Milhem Cortaz, Fabiula Nascimento	Drama	Imagem Filmes	May 29

== See also ==
- 2014 in Brazil
- 2014 in Brazilian television
