= Amazonas Film Festival =

Former film festival in Manaus, Brazil

- Location: Manaus, Amazonas, Brazil
- Founded: 2004
- Most recent: 2013
- Hosted by: Amazonas State Department of Culture

The Amazonas Film Festival (AFF) was an international film festival held in Manaus, the capital of the Brazilian state of Amazonas, from 2004 to 2013. It was organized by the state Department of Culture, at first together with the French company Le Public Système, and its main venue was the city's opera house, the Amazon Theatre (Teatro Amazonas). The early editions were presented as a world festival of adventure films and had an environmental emphasis; later editions gave more room to Brazilian films and to productions from Amazonas. The program combined competitions for international feature films, Brazilian short films and short films from Amazonas with screenings in other parts of the city, workshops and screenplay prizes.

Ten editions were held. Guests included Roman Polanski, Claudia Cardinale and Matt Dillon, and the juries were headed by directors including John Boorman in 2007 and Tudor Giurgiu in 2012. In 2014 the state Department of Culture cancelled that year's edition, and the festival came to an end; the end has been attributed to cuts in the cultural sector, an economic crisis and political changes in the state. The festival has been credited with helping to professionalize film production in Amazonas and with encouraging a new generation of local filmmakers. Film events held in Manaus since then include the Mostra do Cinema Amazonense and the Olhar do Norte festival.

== History ==
=== Background ===
Manaus had hosted film festivals in the 1960s, a period of film-club activity in the city: the first Festival de Cinema Amador do Amazonas in 1966 and the first Festival Norte de Cinema Brasileiro in 1969. In 1987 the Amazonas state government promoted the Primeiro Festival Internacional de Cinema Amazônico (First International Festival of Amazonian Cinema), and in 2001 it set up a film commission, the Amazonas Film Commission. The first Amazonas Film Festival was held in 2004, three years after the commission was created. The Casa do Cinema (House of Cinema) was also created in 2004, to support the festival.

=== Creation ===
Robério Braga, the state secretary of culture, gave an account of the festival's origins in a 2020 interview with Cine Set, a film website from Manaus. He said that the state Department of Culture, set up in 1997, had planned a series of festivals for different art forms, building on the experience of the Festival Amazonas de Ópera. According to Braga, the department had already been developing the idea of a film festival for at least two and a half years when two men approached it wanting to hold one. One was Ivano Cordeiro, a producer from Amazonas and an official of the municipal culture and tourism body; the other was the Belgian Jean-Pierre Dutilleux, who had experience in the sector and contacts in Europe. The two proposals were combined.

Through this contact, Le Public Système, a French communications and audiovisual production group, joined the project with Lionel Chouchan, who had wide experience of international festivals. The governor, Eduardo Braga, agreed to fund the festival after meeting Chouchan and Dutilleux. Robério Braga said that Cordeiro and Dutilleux soon left the project, and that from about the third or fourth edition Chouchan worked without them. He also presented the festival as part of the rehabilitation of the historic center of Manaus and as a way of restoring the Teatro Amazonas as a place for cinema, recalling that films had been shown there in 1897.

The festival was organized by the state Department of Culture together with Le Public Système. Its official launch took place at the Cannes Film Festival in May 2004, in the presence of Governor Braga, who named among its aims the discovery of the Amazon and its natural resources through the world film industry and the generation of local jobs and income. In 2005 Robério Braga told Folha de S.Paulo that the aim was to establish a film hub in the Amazon, which he described as a natural setting for location shooting. In 2011 he told TheWrap that he wanted the festival to be "a catalyst for promoting tourism, training, job generation and income generation".

=== Name and themes ===
The first four editions were presented as the Mundial do Filme de Aventura (World Adventure Film), the fifth and sixth as Aventura, Natureza e Meio Ambiente (Adventure, Nature and Environment), and from the seventh edition the event was called simply the Amazonas Film Festival. Robério Braga later described the adventure label as a marketing device meant to attract major international names. According to the researcher Tetê Mattos, at its creation the festival followed the model of the major European festivals, including a celebrity parade on a long red carpet in the courtyard of the Teatro Amazonas, while its programming focused on adventure and nature films. Over its ten editions the festival changed its curatorial profile and gave more prominence to Brazilian productions, especially those from Amazonas.

In 2005 the Jornal de Brasília described the festival as essentially environmental in character and wrote that it was not by chance that Manaus had been chosen to host it. Robério Braga linked this emphasis to the environmental policy of Eduardo Braga's government, and said that artists planted trees and that the National Institute of Amazonian Research (INPA) was brought in to treat injured animals.

=== Editions ===
==== 2004 to 2006 ====
A preview published in the newspaper Amazonas em Tempo on 17 November 2004 announced that the first edition, the 1º Amazonas Film Festival Mundial do Filme de Aventura, would run from 26 November to 2 December, and cited official estimates of 500 direct and about 1,500 indirect jobs to be generated by the event. According to Cine Set, the competition for fiction feature films began with the first edition and was held throughout the festival's existence. At the first edition 70 productions were shown at bus terminals in Manaus, a practice repeated at later editions, which also showed films made by teenagers taking part in the Jovem Cidadão program.

The second edition was held from 4 to 10 November 2005. The state government contributed R$1.7 million to its budget, and a private sponsor provided the remaining R$2.3 million. On the opening day, Folha de S.Paulo reported that Roman Polanski would arrive the following week with his new film, Oliver Twist, and that a tribute to Claudia Cardinale was being prepared with extras who had worked with her on Werner Herzog's Fitzcarraldo (1982), filmed in the region. The festival attracted Polanski, Cardinale, Ben Gazzara and Alicia Silverstone, and the Canadian producer Norman Jewison sat on its jury; Betty Faria was also among the special guests.

Films were entered in categories for fiction features, ethnological, wildlife and adventure documentaries, Brazilian short films and short films from Amazonas. The German-British production Shooting Dogs, directed by Michael Caton-Jones, won the Grand Jury Prize and the Audience Award, and the Special Jury Prize was shared by Marcelo Gomes's Cinema, Aspirins and Vultures and Lu Chuan's Kekexili: Mountain Patrol. The official screenings at the Teatro Amazonas were presented in Portuguese and English, and the Casa do Cinema held workshops and showed films at several other places in the city. The festival had more than 700 screenings across the city, and the public packed the São Sebastião square on the Saturday when Cinema, Aspirins and Vultures was shown. In its opening-day preview, Folha de S.Paulo had reported that the festival's popularization axis included, according to Robério Braga, the idea of showing one-minute films at bus terminals, fairs and markets at the busiest times of day, which was expected to reach 450,000 viewers.

The third edition was scheduled for 10 to 16 November 2006. On its opening day, Folha de S.Paulo announced that it would honor figures such as Nelson Pereira dos Santos and Lima Duarte and would be attended by foreign directors taking part in its competitions, among them the South Korean Yim Phil-sung, director of Antarctic Journal.

==== 2007 and 2008 ====
In October 2007 the festival announced the program of its fourth edition, scheduled for 9 to 15 November. It was to open with Alastair Fothergill and Mark Linfield's documentary Earth and to close with Jean-Jacques Annaud's His Majesty Minor; Annaud was announced as the year's guest of honor. The announced feature competition included Andrew Dominik's The Assassination of Jesse James by the Coward Robert Ford and Asif Kapadia's Far North. John Boorman was to preside over the feature jury, which included the actresses Elena Anaya, Bai Ling, Caterina Murino and Joana Preiss and the filmmaker Jan Kounen. The festival also announced a documentary competition and the Manaus Symposium, with two debates on the media and the environment. On the opening day, Folha de S.Paulo listed Cacá Diegues, Annaud, Boorman, Dira Paes, Bruna Lombardi, Murino and Bai Ling among the festival's guests.

Marion Hansel's Belgian-French coproduction Sounds of Sand won the Grand Prize of the fourth edition. The jury, headed by Boorman, divided its second prize between Micha Wald's Horse Thieves and Feng Xiaogang's The Assembly, and the Audience Prize went to the Brazilian film The Sign of the City. In the documentary competition, whose jury was presided over by Richard Brock, the top prize went to Jerome Raynaud's Jaglavak, Prince of Insects, the jury prize was shared by Rehad Desai's Bushman's Secret and Jos de Putter's Before the Flood, and the audience prize went to Jorge Bodanzky and Evaldo Mocarzel's Navegar Amazonia. Anderson Mendes's A Incrível História de Coti won both the Grand Prize and the Audience Prize for digital short films; the Grand Prize for 35 mm short films went to Marcio Ramos's Vida Maria and the corresponding audience prize to Cristiane Garcia's Nas Asas do Condor. (Note: Baltazar (2025) dates the audience prize for Nas Asas do Condor to 2006.) The Amazonas screenplay jury gave its prize to Emerson Medina for Os Criminosos.

The fifth edition was scheduled for 7 to 13 November 2008, with a focus on films related to the environment. Alan Parker was to preside over the jury of its nine-film competition, and the other jurors announced included Tchéky Karyo, Santiago Amigorena, Neve Campbell and Parker Posey. The competition included Marco Bechis's Birdwatchers, Arash T. Riahi's For a Moment, Freedom and Sergey Dvortsevoy's Tulpan; Mauricio Farias's Veronica was to open the festival and Matthew Aeberhard and Leander Ward's The Crimson Wing: Mystery of the Flamingos to close it. The announced sidebars included a tribute to Brazilian cinema and competitions for digital shorts and Brazilian shorts; Claude Lelouch was announced as a special guest of honor and Gustavo Dahl as the festival's honorary president.

==== 2009 and 2010 ====
At the 2009 edition, Cristiane Garcia's Abóbora won the Grand Prize and the Audience Prize for digital short films from Amazonas, and Michelle Andrews and Savio Stoco received the jury prize in the same category for Janela para o outro. Debra Granik's Winter's Bone was shown at the 2010 edition. Le Public Système left the organization of the festival in 2010.

==== 2011 ====
The eighth edition took place from 3 to 9 November 2011. It showed 180 films. Its program centered on eight feature films and a little more than two dozen short films, and most of the screenings were held at the Teatro Amazonas. The edition opened with the world premiere of Cao Hamburger's Xingu, about the Villas-Bôas brothers. The film's producer, Fernando Meirelles, attended the opening and introduced the jury, which included the director Randa Haines. The feature program also included Asghar Farhadi's A Separation and Beto Brant and Renato Ciasca's I'd Receive the Worst News from Your Beautiful Lips. Outside the theater, the organizers held screenings at bus stops, prisons, hospitals, cinemas and community centers.

The awards were presented on 9 November at an open-air ceremony in the square where the Teatro Amazonas stands, watched by hundreds of people. A Separation won the awards for best film and best screenplay, Santiago Mitre won best director for El Estudiante, Camila Pitanga and Zé Carlos Machado won the acting awards for I'd Receive the Worst News from Your Beautiful Lips, and Radu Mihăileanu's The Source received the cinematography award and the audience award. The jury gave a special mention to Wolney Oliveira's Brazilian documentary Os Últimos Cangaceiros. Aldemar Matias's film Parente also received an award at that edition.

==== 2012 ====
The ninth edition was scheduled for 3 to 9 November 2012. Its curators selected 25 short films and seven features from 393 entries to compete for prizes offered by the state Department of Culture, and an eighth feature was to be announced later; the competitive sections were international features, Brazilian short films and short films from Amazonas. According to the department, Sérgio Andrade's A Floresta de Jonathas would be the first feature by a local director to compete in the international feature competition. Robério Braga also announced 367 places in workshops, talks and debates. On the opening day, Jornal do Brasil reported that the filmmaker Zelito Viana was the edition's main honoree and that Marcelo Galvão's Colegas would be shown at the opening ceremony. The edition was to include a parallel program of 144 films, with free screenings at the Teatro Amazonas, the Palácio da Justiça, the Cine Teatro Guarany and the Teatro Luiz Cabral, at bus terminals, in six towns in the interior of the state and in rural communities. The festival ended on 9 November with a closing ceremony at the Teatro Amazonas; according to G1, it had shown 73 films from Amazonas, 65 Brazilian films and 25 international films in all.

The jury, presided over by the Romanian director Tudor Giurgiu, gave the best film award to Marcelo Gomes's Once Upon a Time Was I, Verônica, whose lead actress, Hermila Guedes, won best actress. Mads Matthiesen won best director for Teddy Bear, which also received the audience award; Begê Muniz, an actor from Amazonas, won best actor for A Floresta de Jonathas; Paul Laverty won the screenplay award for Ken Loach's The Angels' Share; and Adam Stone won the cinematography award for Craig Zobel's Compliance. Among the short films, Amir Admoni's animation Linear won the Brazilian competition. Et Set Era, by Emerson Medina and Rod Castro, won the Amazonas fiction competition, in which Leonardo Mancini's Uma Doce Dama received the audience award, (Note: O Estado de S. Paulo named Uma Doce Dama the best local fiction film.) and Everton Macedo's Chão Molhado won the Amazonas documentary competition. Flávia Abtibol's Strip Solidão won the Amazonas screenplay competition.

==== 2013 ====
The tenth edition opened on 1 November 2013 at the Teatro Amazonas, with the director and producer Roberto Farias as its honorary president and honoree. It marked the festival's tenth year; according to the Jornal de Brasília, it showed more than 170 films over six days, and its selection favored auteur cinema and international films that had won awards at festivals such as Sundance and San Sebastián. The competitive section opened with free screenings at the Teatro Amazonas. The Brazilian short film competition, with 13 films, mixed fiction, animation and documentary. Robério Braga, who also coordinated the festival, said that in the first editions the organizers had needed to invite films and filmmakers, but that now the filmmakers approached the festival. According to Braga, the training program included talks and workshops on film directing, art direction, costume design and cinematography, scheduled until 5 November. Eleven short films made by pupils taking part in the Jovem Cidadão program were selected for a competitive section.

The closing ceremony was held at the Teatro Amazonas on 6 November 2013, and the festival ended with the screening of Joel Pizzini's documentary Olho Nu, about the singer Ney Matogrosso. Ritesh Batra's The Lunchbox won the jury's award for best film, and Nimrat Kaur won best actress for The Lunchbox. Sean Ellis's Metro Manila won the awards for best director and best screenplay and the audience award, and Barmak Akram's Wajma received the special jury prize. Caio Blat won best actor for Entre Nós, which also won the cinematography award. Among the short films, Marco Nick's Quinto Andar won the Brazilian competition, and Rafael Lima's Germes won the Amazonas fiction competition and the awards for direction and screenplay in that section. Aldemar Matias's Anos de Luz won the Amazonas documentary competition, and Maria Luysa's Para Sempre won the Jovem Cidadão section. The 2013 edition was the festival's last.

=== End of the festival ===
In 2014 the state Department of Culture cancelled that year's festival. According to Cine Set, it remained unclear throughout that year whether the festival would continue: the World Cup was drawing all the attention, and the economic crisis and changes in the political direction of the state government were making it difficult to stage an expensive event. Members of the local arts community met the Department of Culture and proposed a smaller festival, with more emphasis on Latin American and Brazilian films than on Hollywood and European stars, seminars on the festival's ten years, non-competitive screenings of earlier winners and screenings in the city's cinemas instead of the Teatro Amazonas. None of these proposals went ahead. According to Pâmela Baltazar, cuts in the cultural sector, the economic crisis and political changes in Amazonas brought the festival to an end in 2014.

Robério Braga said in 2020 that a smaller festival had been possible and had been attempted, but that the intentions of government policy had changed. According to him, the last two editions were redesigned several times to fit the reduced public funds allocated to the Department of Culture, and private sponsorship alone was not enough to run the event at an international level. The filmmaker Flávia Abtibol, who won the festival's Banco Daycoval screenplay prize in 2012, attributed the outcome to the failure of public managers to see culture as a creative economy and to the limited mobilization of the audiovisual community itself. Caio Pimenta, the editor-in-chief of Cine Set, wrote that sustaining an event of that scale, with international flights and luxury accommodation, was impracticable in the first economic crisis and out of step with the poverty and inequality of the city. In his view the festival could have been reshaped with more attention to Brazilian and Latin American cinema; he attributed much of the failure to do so to a lack of vision among the political leaders of Amazonas, who did not see the audiovisual sector as a productive and profitable industry, and wrote that this contributed to the festival's end.

== Organization and program ==
=== Venue and guests ===
The festival's main venue was the Teatro Amazonas, an opera house built in the late 19th century and featured in Herzog's Fitzcarraldo. Participants over the years included the actor Matt Dillon and the director Roman Polanski. According to Cine Set, the festival's guests of honor also included Claudia Cardinale, Lima Duarte, Glória Pires, Jean-Jacques Annaud, Carla Camurati and Claude Lelouch, and its honorary presidents were Nelson Pereira dos Santos, Cacá Diegues, Gustavo Dahl, Carlos Manga, Soledad Villamil, Fernando Meirelles, Zelito Viana and Roberto Farias; Alan Parker and Neve Campbell were among its other guests.

=== Competitions and awards ===
A competition for films from Amazonas was first held in 2005. From then until the last edition, in 2013, 96 productions from Amazonas, 95 of them short films and one a feature, competed for prizes in international, national and regional categories. More than 150 films directed by women in Amazonas were shown in the festival's parallel programs, and 36 films directed by women competed in the Amazonas competition. In the last two editions, 2012 and 2013, the Amazonas short film competition had separate fiction and documentary sections.

The festival's trophy was called Voo na Floresta (Flight in the Forest) or Voo da Floresta.

Screenplay prizes supported the production of short films. Dheik Praia won the Banco Daycoval screenplay prize in 2011 with Rota da ilusão, which was shown at the festival the following year, and Flávia Abtibol won it in 2012 with Strip Solidão, which competed in the Brazilian short film competition in 2013. The eighth Concurso Amazonas de Roteiro (Amazonas Screenplay Competition) was held in 2013.

=== Training ===
Robério Braga listed among the festival's activities courses, workshops and lectures, scholarships at the Escuela Internacional de Cine y Televisión in Cuba and the Banco Daycoval screenplay prizes. The film educators of the Jovem Cidadão school program were trained in workshops held during the festival, in which invited professionals taught screenwriting, cinematography, editing, sound and production. In 2013 Braga said that the festival had been bearing fruit since its creation, citing the film courses of the Jovem Cidadão program, the Liceu de Artes e Ofícios Cláudio Santoro and the Amazonas State University (UEA). Cine Set described the university's technical course in audiovisual production as potentially one of the festival's main legacies; the course was discontinued after two classes.

=== Funding ===
At its creation the festival had substantial sponsorship from Coca-Cola and some funding from the state government. Robério Braga named Bradesco, Banco Daycoval, Coca-Cola and Semp Toshiba among its sponsors, together with local businesses that reduced their costs so that the festival could hire them. He described it as an expensive event, with payments such as air fares made in euros and dollars, so that the cost of each edition depended heavily on exchange rates, and said that the investment had been important at the time.

== Assessments and legacy ==
Renata Rocha, Carmen Lima and Leonardo Costa wrote in 2024 that over its ten editions the festival became the most important film festival in Brazil's North Region. In 2017 Rafael de Figueiredo Lopes called it the largest film festival in the north of the country, but wrote that it had always favored international productions as a commercial strategy. Mattos put forward the hypothesis that the festival's official representations had a rather Eurocentric bias, and that its discourse changed to some extent as productions from Amazonas gained more prominence in the program.

Pâmela Baltazar credits the festival with fostering the professionalization of film production in Amazonas and with boosting the careers of local filmmakers such as Sérgio Andrade, Aldemar Matias, Flávia Abtibol and Cristiane Garcia, through contact with Brazilian and international professionals, its educational activities, the scholarships in Cuba and the Banco Daycoval prizes. Pimenta also credited the festival with encouraging a new generation of filmmakers in Amazonas, among them Aldemar Matias, Sérgio Andrade, Anderson Mendes, Christiane Garcia, Rod Castro, Ricardo Manjaro and Rafael Ramos, saying that it helped them to make films and to form partnerships that gave rise to new production companies in Manaus.

Sérgio Andrade, who showed his first short film as a director at the festival in 2007 and his feature A Floresta de Jonathas there in 2012, told Cine Set in 2020 that its main legacy was a sense of professionalism and of the film industry among audiences and local filmmakers. He described its greatest failure as discontinuity: in his view the event could have been used to introduce a permanent law requiring annual funding calls, or a culture incentive law, and after it ended the local film scene was left without public policies or regular funding calls at either municipal or state level.

The Fórum do Audiovisual do Amazonas organized the Mostra do Cinema Amazonense from 2015 to 2017, which Baltazar describes as a stance taken by the arts community on the festival not being held for two consecutive years. The Olhar do Norte festival, produced by Artrupe Produções, was first held in 2018. Cine Set also listed among the later initiatives the Pirarucurta, aimed at university audiovisual work, the Cine Bodó, in the outskirts of Manaus, and the Matapi, an audiovisual market event with pitching sessions and business rounds.
