= List of Brazilian films of 2005 =

A list of films produced in Brazil in 2005 (see 2005 in film):

== 2005 ==
| Title | Director | Cast | Genre | Notes |
|---|---|---|---|---|
| Achados e Perdidos | | | | |
| Alice | | | | |
| Cidade Baixa | Sérgio Machado | Wagner Moura, Lázaro Ramos, Alice Braga | Drama | Screened at the 2005 Cannes Film Festival |
| Cinema, Aspirins and Vultures | Marcelo Gomes | Peter Ketnath | | Screened at the 2005 Cannes Film Festival |
| Crime Delicado | | | Drama | |
| Dois Filhos de Francisco | | | Drama-biography | Grossed +$14 million, a record in Brazil |
| O Amigo Dunor | | | | |
| O Casamento de Romeu e Julieta | | | | |
| Os Amantes | | | | |
| Xuxinha e Guto contra os Monstros do Espaço | Clewerson Saremba and Moacyr Góes | | Live-action/animated film | |

== See also ==
- 2005 in Brazil
- 2005 in Brazilian television
