= Peter Ketnath =

German actor, producer and writer

- Born: June 6, 1974 (age 52)
- Education: Freie Universität Berlin
- Known for: Actor, film producer and screenwriter

Peter Ketnath (born June 6, 1974) is a German actor, film producer and screenwriter.

He is fluent in English, German, Spanish and Portuguese and starred in numerous international productions playing characters from widely ranged backgrounds. He also produces and has written two screenplays.

== Early life ==
Born to a doctor and a painter from partly German and Jewish ancestry, Ketnath developed his interest in the performing arts at an early age. Right after finishing secondary school in his hometown Munich, he attended a directing course at New York Film Academy which mainly raised his interest in acting. Back in his hometown Munich he attended the infamous Zinner Studio where he graduated. He then completed his studies at the HB Studio in New York and graduated in Film at Freie Universität Berlin.

== Career ==
While still in drama school, he debuted to play the lead in Joseph Vilsmaier's And Nobody Weeps for Me, alongside actress Nina Hoss. The critically acclaimed film tells the story of young Leo Knie, a young German in the 1930s who resists the seduction of Adolf Hitler and instead of going to war, struggles with his own personal life. After the film's success, Ketnath continued his studies and work in the theater in Munich. He also participated in several films and series as a protagonist or guest actor, in numerous national projects and also in international co-productions, such as Minona, between Germany, France, and Russia, which tells the personal life of Ludwig van Beethoven.

In 1998, the actor financed his university studies by being part of the main cast in the prime time series Klinikum Berlin Mitte – Leben in Bereitschaft, where he played Dr. Daniel Thies for three consecutive seasons. The series was the German version of ER and popular in several European countries.

In 2001, he was part of the Emmy Awards-winning miniseries Die Manns – Ein Jahrhundertroman, which told the life and work of German writer Thomas Mann, played by Armin Mueller-Stahl. He played Franz Westermeier who inspired Thomas Mann to write Confessions of Felix Krull.

Still in 2001, he also discovered his passion for Brazilian cinema and the Portuguese language through a special at the Berlin International Film Festival. He began to master the language and expanded his range to South America. Cinema, Aspirins and Vultures, by Marcelo Gomes, premiered in 2005 at the Cannes Film Festival. The critically acclaimed film won several national and international awards and was distributed in Germany by Arte Television. The film also represented Brazil in the dispute for the Academy Awards for the best foreign film, but was not nominated. He played Johann Hohenfels, a fictional character who flees the chaos of WWII and as a peace-loving pacifist travels the backlands of Brazil selling Aspirins to the poor by showing them commercial films through his movie projector, completely new for them at the time.

From 2004 to 2006, he took turns in German and Brazilian productions: he was part of the main cast of the new prime time series Die Gerichtsmedizinerin. In 2005, he played Mark, a German tourist who gets involved in an unhappy relationship with a desperate young hooker and tries life with her in Berlin, in Deserto Feliz, a drama by Paulo Caldas, which premiered at the Berlin Festival and won several film festivals. He was part of the cast of the soap opera Pé na Jaca, directed by Ricardo Waddington for TV Globo, which was highly popular. In 2008 Ketnath worked again with Joseph Vilsmaier, participating in the main cast of the film The Legend of Brandner Kaspar, based on a book by Wolfgang Franz von Kobell. The film was a box office success and became a modern classic that is often repeated on German TV. The year 2009 saw the beginning of his work in the criminal series Stuttgart Homicide, playing the lead male detective who sticks to his personal freedom and his own sense of justice. The series is popular and in 2021 has entered its 13th season.

In 2014, he participated in the Brazilian comedy Os Homens São de Marte... E é pra Lá que Eu Vou!. The romantic comedy was the most watched national film in Brazil in 2014. In the Brazilian animation Nimuendajú, directed by Tania Anaya, he played the ethnologist Curt Nimuendajú, who lived more than 40 years with Indigenous peoples throughout Brazil, becoming one of the most important references in studies on the subject in the 20th century. In Klaus Mitteldorf's Vou nadar Até Você he plays Tedesco, a visual artist who is in the midst of a mid-life crisis. When he receives a letter from a possible daughter, played by Bruna Marquezine, life changes irreversibly for both of them. Playing a character 20 years older than himself, Ketnath proved his interpretational range another time.

In 2018, he came back to the stage and participated in Wolfgang Amadeus Mozart's opera Die Entführung aus dem Serail in the role of Bassa Selim, the emperor who finally frees his slave Konstanze. In 2020 the film When in Venice premiered in several countries where Ketnath combined acting, producing and writing.

His most recent work is his work on the miniseries Passport to Freedom, directed by Jayme Monjardim and produced by Sony and TV Globo. He plays the antagonist Thomas Zumckle, a general of Hitler's elite troops who falls sickly in love with Aracy de Carvalho, a German-Brazilian secretary who saved numerous Jews from the Holocaust.

== Producer ==
With his Germany based production company Cinezebra GmbH, he produces audiovisual content, mainly international co-productions.

== Personal life ==
Ketnath is married to Maykelis, a German artist of Cuban origin, and has two children. The couple lives between Munich and Berlin.

== Filmography ==
=== Actor ===
- 1995: And Nobody Weeps for Me (film)
- 1996: Minona (film)
- 1997: Die Unzertrennlichen (TV series)
- 1997: Eine Herzensangelegenheit (film)
- 1998: Zwei Brüder
- 1998: Derrick
- 1999: Preis der Unschuld (film)
- 1999: Dr. Stefan Frank – Der Arzt, dem die Frauen vertrauen (TV series)
- 1999: Der Bulle von Tölz: Tod aus dem All (TV film)
- 2000–2002: Klinikum Berlin Mitte – Leben in Bereitschaft (TV series)
- 2000: Dr. Stefan Frank – Der Arzt, dem die Frauen vertrauen – Drückerschwärze (TV series)
- 2000: Der letzte Zeuge – Der vierte Mann (TV series)
- 2001: Die Manns – Ein Jahrhundertroman (mini-series)
- 2002: Edel & Starck – Eiertanz (TV series)
- 2003: Spurlos (film)
- 2004: Einmal Bulle, immer Bulle (TV series)
- 2004: SOKO 5113 (TV series)
- 2005: Cinema, Aspirins and Vultures (film)
- 2005: Die Gerichtsmedizinerin (TV series)
- 2005: Der Bulle von Tölz: Liebesleid (TV film)
- 2006: Die Rosenheim-Cops – In der Höhle des Mörders (TV series)
- 2006: Pe na jaca
- 2007: Deserto Feliz (film)
- 2007: Die Rettungsflieger (TV series)
- 2007: Sweet Like Chocolate (film)
- 2008: Im Tal der wilden Rosen – Gipfel der Liebe (TV film)
- 2008: Alice (TV miniseries)
- 2008: The Legend of Brandner Kaspar (film)
- 2008: Alarm für Cobra 11 – Die Autobahnpolizei (TV series)
- 2009: Tatort – Im Sog des Bösen (TV film)
- 2009: Lasko - Die Faust Gottes
- 2009: Richterin ohne Robe (TV film)
- 2009–2021: Stuttgart Homicide (TV series)
- 2013: Kripo Holstein – Mord und Meer (TV series)
- 2014: Os Homens São de Marte... E é pra Lá que Eu Vou! (film)
- 2014: Soledad (film)
- 2016: Another Forever (film)
- 2019: Dr. Klein – Aller Anfang ist schwer (TV series)
- 2019: Hubert ohne Staller – Jeder Schuss ein Treffer (TV series)
- 2021: Um Himmels Willen: Hindernisse des Herzens (TV series)
- 2021: When in Venice (film)
- 2021: Ein Sommer auf drei Rädern (film)
- 2021: WAPO Bodensee (TV series)
- 2022: Passport to Freedom (mini-series)

=== Producer ===
- 2007: Happy Desert (film)
- 2012: Nimuendaju (animation)
- 2016: Another Forever (film)
- 2018: Laisse le vent emporter tout (film)
- 2019: Ophelia's Death (film)
- 2019: Tropical Abyss (documentary)
- 2019: We still have the deep black night (film)
- 2021: When in Venice (film)

=== Writer ===
- 2018: O mar vai virar Sertao e o Sertao vai virar o mar (film)
- 2021: When in Venice (film)
- 2022: The summer of 87 (mini-series)
