= João Miguel (actor) =

Brazilian actor, screenwriter, and director (born 1970)

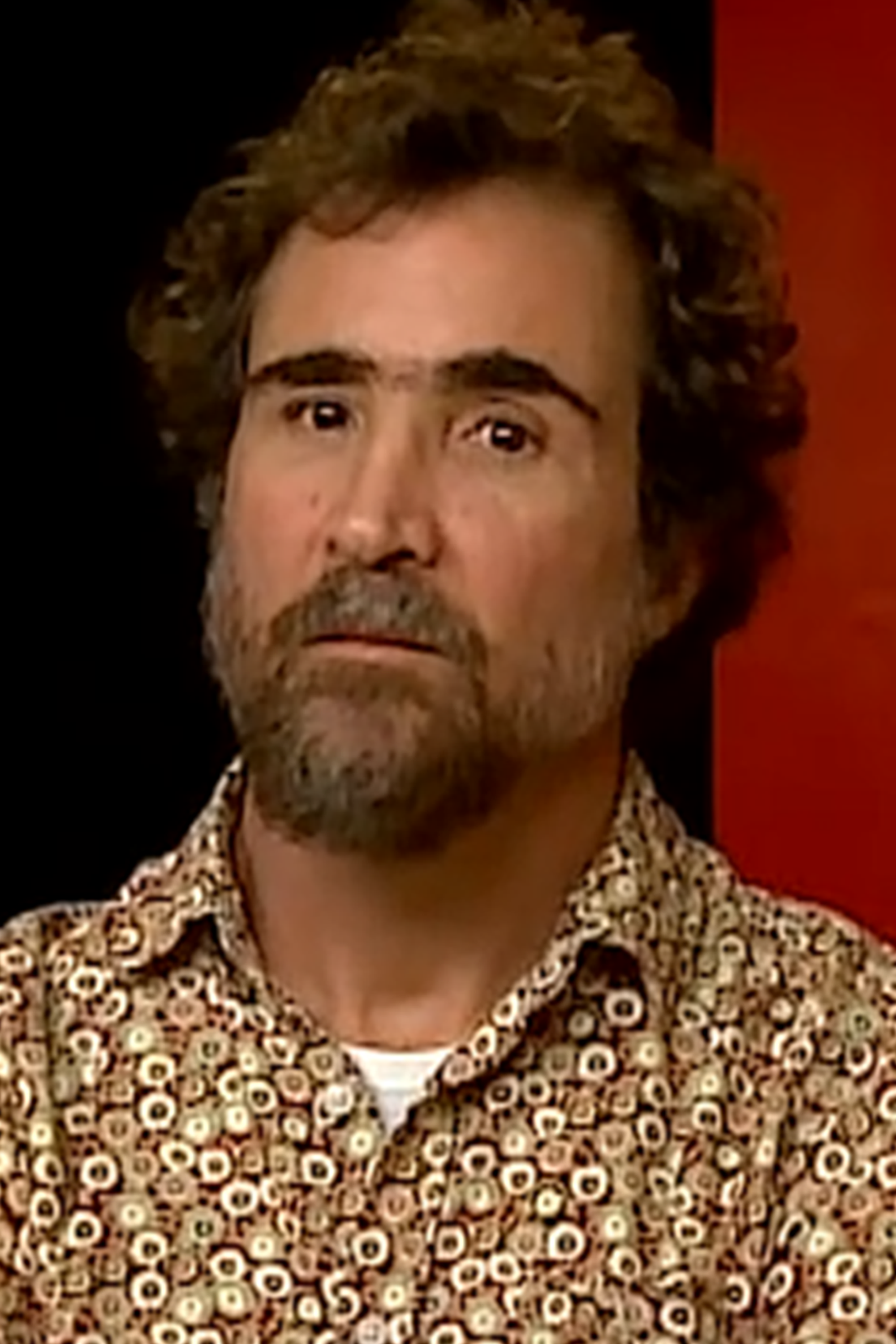
- Miguel in 2016
- Born: João Miguel Serrano Leonelli; 1 January 1970 (age 55); Salvador, Bahia, Brazil
- Occupation: Actor
- Years active: 1979–present
- Known for: 3%

João Miguel Serrano Leonelli (born 1 January 1970), known professionally as João Miguel, is a Brazilian actor. He is known to international audiences for his role in the Netflix series 3%.

== Biography ==
João Miguel was born in Salvador, Bahia. He is the son of politician Domingos Leonelli and artist Magali Serrano.

== Career ==
He began his acting career on television at the age of 9, in Nonato Freire's Bombom Show. At the age of 13 or 14, he debuted as the main character in the play A Viagem de um Barquinho, directed by Petinha Barreto. He also performed in the circus and, along with street children, put on shows in schools, public hospitals, and in the favelas of Salvador as well as the interior of Bahia. At 17, he went to Rio de Janeiro and trained as an actor in the Casa de Arte das Laranjeiras, where he met Luiz Carlos Vasconcelos, actor and director at Group Piolim. He then went to João Pessoa, where he perfected his circus art with Luiz Carlos, and then traveled in Brazil and elsewhere in the world following the piece O Vau da Sarapalha.

He performed in the solo piece Bishop, the story of the Sergipean artist Arthur Bispo do Rosário, which he staged for years in several Brazilian cities. Director Marcelo Gomes invited him to star in the film Cinema, Aspirinas e Urubus, for which he won several awards at the Cannes Film Festival; he himself considers it one of the best movies he has made.

Miguel has appeared in numerous feature films and television projects, including the telenovela Cordel Encantado. He has been called "one of the most talented and versatile actors of his generation". His presence in four of the first six films presented in the Rede Globo 50th anniversary retrospective series Luz, Câmera, 50 Anos, led some to call it, jokingly, the "João Miguel Festival".

Between 2016 and 2018, he held a major role in the first Portuguese-language Netflix original series, 3%.

== Filmography ==
=== Film ===
List of film appearances, with year, title, and role shown
Year	Title	Role	Notes
2005	Cinema, Aspirins and Vultures	Ranulpho	
2005	Lower City	Edvan	
2006	Suely in the Sky	João	
2007	Estômago	Nonato	
2009	Se Nada Mais Der Certo	Wilson	
2011	Xingu	Claudio Villas-Bôas	
2012	Once Upon a Time Was I, Verônica	Gustavo	
2012	À Beira do Caminho	João	
2024	Estômago II: O Poderoso Chef	Nonato	

=== Television ===
List of television appearances, with year, title, and role shown
Year	Title	Role	Notes
2007/2008	A Grande Família	Plínio	2 episodes
2008	Casos e Acasos		
2011	Cordel Encantado	Belarmino (Bel)	14 episodes
2011	Força-Tarefa	Carlos Henrique	1 episode
2013	O Canto da Sereia	Beroaldo (Só Love)	4 episodes
2015	Felizes para Sempre?	Hugo Drummond	10 episodes
2016-2018	3%	Ezequiel	18 episodes
2018	Assédio	Odair José Miranda	8 episodes
