= 2005 in Brazil =

Events in the year 2005 in Brazil.

== Incumbents ==
=== Federal government ===
- President: Luiz Inácio Lula da Silva
- Vice President: José Alencar Gomes da Silva

=== Governors ===
- Acre: Jorge Viana
- Alagoas: Ronaldo Lessa
- Amapa: Waldez Góes
- Amazonas: Eduardo Braga
- Bahia: Paulo Souto
- Ceará: Lúcio Alcântara
- Espírito Santo: Paulo Hartung
- Goiás: Marconi Perillo
- Maranhão: José Reinaldo Tavares
- Mato Grosso: Blairo Maggi
- Mato Grosso do Sul: José Orcírio Miranda dos Santos
- Minas Gerais: Aécio Neves
- Pará: Simão Jatene
- Paraíba: Cássio Cunha Lima
- Paraná: Hermas Eurides Brandão
- Pernambuco: Jarbas Vasconcelos
- Piauí: Wellington Dias
- Rio de Janeiro: Rosinha Garotinho
- Rio Grande do Norte: Wilma Maria de Faria
- Rio Grande do Sul: Germano Rigotto
- Rondônia: Ivo Narciso Cassol
- Roraima: Ottomar de Sousa Pinto
- Santa Catarina: Luiz Henrique da Silveira
- São Paulo: Geraldo Alckmin
- Sergipe: João Filho
- Tocantins: Marcelo Miranda

=== Vice governors ===
- Acre: Arnóbio Marques de Almeida Júnior
- Alagoas: Luís Abílio de Sousa Neto
- Amapá: Pedro Paulo Dias de Carvalho
- Amazonas: Omar José Abdel Aziz
- Bahia: Eraldo Tinoco Melo
- Ceará: Francisco de Queiroz Maia Júnior
- Espírito Santo: Wellington Coimbra
- Goiás: Alcides Rodrigues Filho
- Maranhão: Jurandir Ferro do Lago Filho
- Mato Grosso: Iraci Araújo Moreira
- Mato Grosso do Sul: Egon Krakheche
- Minas Gerais: Clésio Soares de Andrade
- Pará: Valéria Pires Franco
- Paraíba: Lauremília Lucena
- Paraná: Orlando Pessuti
- Pernambuco: José Mendonça Bezerra Filho
- Piauí: Osmar Ribeiro de Almeida Júnior
- Rio de Janeiro: Luiz Paulo Conde
- Rio Grande do Norte: Antônio Jácome
- Rio Grande do Sul: Antônio Carlos Hohlfeldt
- Rondônia: Odaísa Fernandes Ferreira
- Roraima: Erci de Moraes
- Santa Catarina: Eduardo Pinho Moreira
- São Paulo: Claudio Lembo
- Sergipe: Marília Mandarino
- Tocantins: Raimundo Nonato Pires dos Santos

== Events ==
=== January ===
- January 27: The airline VASP ceases all operations. They would declare bankruptcy by September 4, 2008.

=== February ===
- February 12: American nun and environmentalist, Dorothy Stang is murdered in Anapu, Pará.
- February 15: Federal deputy Severino Cavalcanti from the PP, is elected president of the Chamber of Deputies.

=== March ===
- March 2: The Brazilian Chamber of Deputies approves the Biosafety Law, which allows research with embryonic stem cells, as well as the planting and commercialization of transgenic products.

=== May ===
- May 14: Veja magazine releases a video recording, showing the director of the Post Office, Maurício Marinho receiving bribes from businessmen.
- May 24: A strong F3 multi-vortex wedge tornado strikes the city of Indaiatuba in São Paulo, causing an estimated R$97.2 million (BRL) in damage.

=== June ===
- June 16: The Minister of the Civil House, José Dirceu, resigns from his position to answer Roberto Jefferson's accusations.
- June 29: Brazil defeats Argentina 4-1, to win their second FIFA Confederations Cup trophy.

=== August ===
- August 6-7: About R$164 million is stolen from the vault of the Banco Central branch located in Fortaleza, Ceará.

=== September ===
- September 14: The Chamber of Deputies of Brazil approves the impeachment of federal deputy Roberto Jefferson.
- September 21: The President of the Chamber of Deputies, Severino Cavalcanti, is accused of charging bribes. As a result he resigns from his mandate and from his position as deputy.
- September 23: A Veja Magazine article reports a football match-fixing scandal, which evolves into a lawsuit and investigation by the Federal Police Department. This would be known as the Máfia do Apito.
- September 29: 2005 MTV Video Music Brazil.

=== October ===
- October 23: In a referendum, the Brazilian population votes no to prohibit the sale of firearms in the country.

=== November ===
- November 30: The Chamber of Deputies of Brazil approves the impeachment of Chief Minister of the Civil House, José Dirceu.

=== December ===
- December 18: São Paulo defeats Liverpool 1-0 to win the 2005 FIFA Club World Cup.

== Births ==
- February 28 – Vitor Roque, footballer

== Deaths ==
=== January ===
- 17 January – Bezerra da Silva, samba musician (b. 1927)

=== March ===
- 10 March – Zilka Salaberry, actress (b. 1917)

=== December ===
- 22 December – Aurora Miranda, singer and actress (b. 1915)

== Film ==
- List of Brazilian films of 2005

== Television ==
=== Debuted ===
- Alma Gêmea
- Anabel
- Belíssima
- Dança dos Famosos
- Fudêncio e Seus Amigos
- Mandrake
- Pixcodelics

=== Ended ===
- City of Men
- Começar de Novo
- A Escrava Isaura
- Esmeralda
- Floribella
- Senhora do Destino

== Music ==
- Black Drawing Chalks and Ksis are formed.
- Smack (Brazilian band) reunite.
- MX (band) reunite for a second time.
- Patife Band reunite also for a second time.

== Sport ==
- 2005 in Brazilian football
- 2005 Grand Prix de Futsal
- 2005 FIFA Beach Soccer World Cup
- 2005 Brazilian Grand Prix
- 2005 Desafio Internacional das Estrelas
- 2005 Stock Car Brasil season
- 2005 Brasil Open
- 2005 Volleyball America's Cup in São Leopoldo, Rio Grande do Sul.
- 2005 Men's South American Volleyball Championship in Lages, Santa Catarina (state).
- 2005 Pan American Men's Youth Handball Championship in Brusque, Santa Catarina.
- Brazil become 2nd in the 2005 South American Rugby Championship "B" in Paraguay.
- 2005 Saint Silvester Road Race
- Jungle Fight 4 MMA event.
- 2005 Copa América de Ciclismo

== See also ==
- 2005 in Brazilian football
