= Exu =

Exu, ExU or EXU may refer to:

- Exu, Pernambuco, a city in Brazil
- Exú, a Yoruba divinity
- Exu Formation, a Mesozoic geologic formation in Brazil
- Exu, a character in the 2013 Brazilian drama film, Riocorrente
- Exu, a type of spirit in Afro-Brazilian Quimbanda
- EXU, the execute instruction on the SDS 9 series
- Empress Lü (241–180 BC), courtesy name Exu
- Exandria Unlimited (ExU), an anthology web series set in the Critical Role universe
