= Matupá Airport =

Orlando Villas-Bôas Regional Airport Aeroporto Regional Orlando Villas-Bôas
- IATA: MBK; ICAO: SWXM; LID: MT0014

Summary
- Airport type: Public
- Serves: Matupá
- Time zone: BRT−1 (UTC−04:00)
- Elevation AMSL: 270 m (890 ft)
- Coordinates: 10°10′12″S 054°57′14″W

Map
- Location in Brazil

Runways
Direction	Length		Surface
Direction	m	ft	Surface
02/20	1,858	6,096	Asphalt
- Source: ANAC, DECEA

Orlando Villas-Bôas Regional Airport (IATA: MBK, ICAO: SWXM) is the airport serving Matupá, Brazil. The airport is named after Orlando Villas-Bôas, the oldest of the Villas-Bôas brothers, Brazilian activists who in 1961 succeeded in getting the entire upper Xingu legally protected.

== Accidents and incidents ==
- 23 July 2024: a private Learjet 35, registration PP-ERR crashed in a eucalyptus forest after take-off; the aircraft broke up and burst into flames. Both occupants were killed. The accident occurred during a go-around following a local flight.

== Access ==
The airport is located 4 km (2 mi) from downtown Matupá.

== See also ==
- List of airports in Brazil
