= 2005 in Brazilian television =

This is a list of Brazilian television related events from 2005.

== Events ==
- 29 March - Jean Wyllys wins the fifth season of Big Brother Brasil.
- 18 December - Actress Karina Bacchi and her partner Fabiano Vivas win the first season of Dança dos Famosos.

== Debuts ==
- 20 November - Dança dos Famosos (2005–present)
- No date - MTVLab (2005-2011)

== Television shows ==
=== 1970s ===
- Turma da Mônica (1976–present)

=== 1990s ===
- Malhação (1995–2020)
- Cocoricó (1996–2013)

=== 2000s ===
- Sítio do Picapau Amarelo (2001–2007)
- Big Brother Brasil (2002–present)
- Dança dos Famosos (2005–present)

== Networks and services ==
=== Launches ===
Network	Type	Launch date	Notes	Source
Mix TV	Cable television	21 January		
Discovery Science	Cable and satellite	16 March		
Discovery Turbo	Cable television	16 March		
ForMan	Cable television	31 March		
FX	Cable and satellite	1 May		
Cine Brazil TV	Cable and satellite	1 June		
MTV Hits Brasil	Cable television	30 June		
Animax	Cable television	31 July		
Rede Aparecida	Cable and satellite	8 September		
TV da Gente	Cable and satellite	20 November		
VH1	Cable and satellite	21 November		

== Ending this year ==
- FAMA (2002-2005)

== See also ==
- 2005 in Brazil
- List of Brazilian films of 2005
