= I Travel Because I Have to, I Come Back Because I Love You =

2009 film directed by Marcelo Gomes, Karim Aïnouz

- Directed by: Marcelo Gomes; Karim Aïnouz
- Written by: Marcelo Gomes; Karim Aïnouz
- Produced by: João Vieira Jr.
- Starring: Irandhir Santos
- Cinematography: Heloísa Passos
- Edited by: Karen Harley
- Production company: Rec Productores Asociados
- Distributed by: Espaço Filmes
- Release dates: 4 September 2009 (Venice); 7 May 2010
- Running time: 75 minutes
- Country: Brazil
- Language: Portuguese
- Box office: R$243,332

I Travel Because I Have to, I Come Back Because I Love You (Portuguese: Viajo Porque Preciso, Volto Porque te Amo) is a 2009 Brazilian drama film written and directed by Marcelo Gomes and Karim Aïnouz.

== Plot ==
José Renato (Irandhir Santos), a geologist, is sent on a 30-day assignment into an isolated region in the Northeast of Brazil. The film is a road movie with a succession of images of the passing landscape and seemingly endless highway, narrated by the protagonist.
