= Once Upon a Time Was I, Verônica =

2012 film directed by Marcelo Gomes

- Theatrical poster
- Directed by: Marcelo Gomes
- Screenplay by: Marcelo Gomes
- Produced by: João Vieira Jr. Sara Silveira; Maria Ionescu; Chico Ribeiro; Ofir Figueiredo
- Starring: Hermila Guedes; João Miguel; W. J Solha
- Cinematography: Mauro Pinheiro Jr
- Edited by: Karen Harley
- Music by: Tomaz Alves Souza; Karina Buhr
- Production companies: Dezenove Som e Imagem; REC Produtores Associados
- Distributed by: Imovision
- Release dates: September 8, 2012 (TIFF); November 16, 2012 (Brazil)
- Running time: 91 minutes
- Country: Brazil
- Language: Portuguese
- Box office: R$209,975

Once Upon a Time Was I, Verônica (Portuguese: Era Uma Vez Eu, Verônica) is a 2012 Brazilian drama film directed and written by Marcelo Gomes. At the 45th Festival de Brasília it shared the Best Film Award with They'll Come Back, and won Best Supporting Actor (W. J Solha), Best Screenplay, Best Cinematography and Best Score.

== Plot ==
Veronica, a newly graduated medical student, goes through a moment of reflection and doubt. She questions not only her professional choices, but also her intimate relationships and even her ability to cope with life.

== Cast ==
- Hermila Guedes as Verônica
- João Miguel as Gustavo
- W. J Solha as Zé Maria
- Renata Roberta as Maria
- Inaê Veríssimo as Ciça
- Maeve Jinkings
