= Passport to Freedom =

Brazilian television miniseries

- Portuguese: Passaporte para Liberdade
- Genre: Drama
- Created by: Mário Teixeira
- Written by: Rachel Anthony
- Directed by: Jayme Monjardim
- Starring: Sophie Charlotte; Rodrigo Lombardi; Peter Ketnath
- Opening theme: "Saudade" by Adriana Mezzadri feat. Giovanna Clayton
- Country of origin: Brazil
- Original language: English
- No. of seasons: 1
- No. of episodes: 8

Production
- Executive producers: Silvio de Abreu; Monica Albuquerque; Elisabetta Zenatti
- Producers: Fabiana Moreno; Samantha Santos; Mariana Monteiro
- Production companies: Estúdios Globo; Sony Pictures Television; Floresta

Original release
- Network: TV Globo
- Release: 20 December – 30 December 2021

Passport to Freedom (Portuguese: Passaporte para Liberdade) is a Brazilian television miniseries produced by Estúdios Globo, Sony Pictures Television, and Floresta. The miniseries is written by Mário Teixeira, with the collaboration of Rachel Anthony. It aired on TV Globo from 20 December 2021 to 30 December 2021, and stars Sophie Charlotte, Rodrigo Lombardi, and Peter Ketnath. The miniseries tells the story of Aracy de Carvalho, an employee of the Brazilian consulate in Hamburg, Germany. It is loosely based on the 2011 book Justa ‒ Aracy de Carvalho e o resgate de judeus: trocando a Alemanha nazista pelo Brasil by historian Mônica Raisa Schpun.

== Plot ==
In 1935, Aracy de Carvalho (Sophie Charlotte) goes to Germany and lands a position in the passport department of the Brazilian consulate in Hamburg. It was there that she managed to save many Jews from prison and the Holocaust by facilitating the issuing of visas to Brazil. João Guimarães Rosa (Rodrigo Lombardi) is asked to be Brazil's deputy consul and meets Aracy on his first day of work and immediately falls in love with her. João realizes that Aracy is hiding something and questions her. Aracy explains her whole scheme to João. He hesitates, but soon becomes convinced that it was the right thing to do. Aracy also attracts the attention of Nazi Thomas Zumkle (Peter Ketnath), an important captain of the SS. Zumkle becomes obsessed with discovering Aracy's secret, and his frequent insinuations, in addition to annoying Aracy, jeopardize all the help she offers to the Jews.

== Cast ==
=== Main ===
- Sophie Charlotte as Aracy de Carvalho
- Rodrigo Lombardi as João Guimarães Rosa
- Peter Ketnath as Thomas Zumkle
- Stefan Weinert as Milton Hardner
- Tomas Sinclair Spencer as Karl Schaffer
- Gabriela Petry as Taibele Bashevis / Vivi Krüger
- Izabela Gwizdak as Margarethe Levy
- Sivan Mast as Helena Krik
- Tarcísio Filho as Joaquim Antônio de Souza Ribeiro
- Theo Medon as Eduardo "Edu" de Carvalho Tess
- Jacopo Garfagnoli as Rudi Katz
- Aryè Campos as Tina Fallada
- Phil Miler as Samuel Bashevis
- Bruce Gomlevsky as Hugo Levy
- Helena Varvaki as Batsheva
- Jimmy London as Mendel Krik
- Fabiana Gugli as Mina Schwartz

=== Recurring ===
- João Côrtes as Wilfried Shwartz
- Camilla Lecciolli as Sonja Katz
- Brian Townes as Commander Heinz
- David Wendefilm as Bohm
- Ivo Müller as Agent Krause
- J.G. Franklin as Agent Karlson
- Olé Erdmann as Aribert Brunner / Alois Brunner
- Bruno Sigrist as Helmut
- Clarice Alves as Consuela Anita

== Production ==
The miniseries was announced in May 2019, initially titled O Anjo de Hamburgo (The Angel of Hamburg). The miniseries is the first TV Globo production to be entirely spoken in English. Filming began in February 2020. In March 2020, production was shut down due to the COVID-19 pandemic. Filming resumed on 13 February 2021, and concluded in May 2021.

== Episodes ==
No.	Title	Original release date	Brazil viewers (Rating points)
1	"Episode 1"	20 December 2021	11.1
João Guimarães Rosa is sent to Hamburg and is presented to Aracy at the consulate. Vivi is bothered by young Nazis, but Zumkle stops them.
2	"Episode 2"	21 December 2021	10.7
The murder of a German diplomat by a Jew leads to the Night of Broken Glass. Helena tries to convince Vivi to spy on SS officers. Rudi is arrested. João discovers Aracy's plan.
3	"Episode 3"	22 December 2021	9.5
Zumkle promises Vivi that he will free her father. The captain follows Aracy and discovers that she is helping Hugo and Margarethe. João and Aracy are watched by Zumkle.
4	"Episode 4"	23 December 2021	9.3
Zumkle takes advantage of the expropriation of non-Aryan companies. Vivi decides to help Helena by getting information for the resistance. Zumkle makes a false accusation against João.
5	"Episode 5"	27 December 2021	9.0
Gestapo investigates Hardner and João. Vivi seduces Schaffer to obtain information. Zumkle tries to force a kiss on Aracy, she hits him. Schaffer discovers that Vivi is Jewish.
6	"Episode 6"	28 December 2021	10.9
Rudi and Helena take part in a foiled attack against Goebbels at the Portuguese embassy, where Aracy and João were at. A bomb hits the Brazilian consulate.
7	"Episode 7"	27 December 2021	10.1
Hamburg is under constant air attack. João helps Mina's son, who has returned traumatized from the war front. Aracy asks Zumkle for help, he wants something in return.
8	"Episode 8"	30 December 2021	9.2
Hardner, Aracy and João plan Rudi's escape. Zumkle is determined to stop the plan and follows João. Aracy and João are arrested and return to Brazil after a forced exile.

== Ratings ==
Season	Episodes	First aired		Last aired		Avg. viewers (in points)
Season	Episodes	Date	Viewers (in points)	Date	Viewers (in points)	Avg. viewers (in points)
1	8	20 December 2021	11.1	30 December 2021	9.2	9.98
