= Joaquim (film) =

2017 film

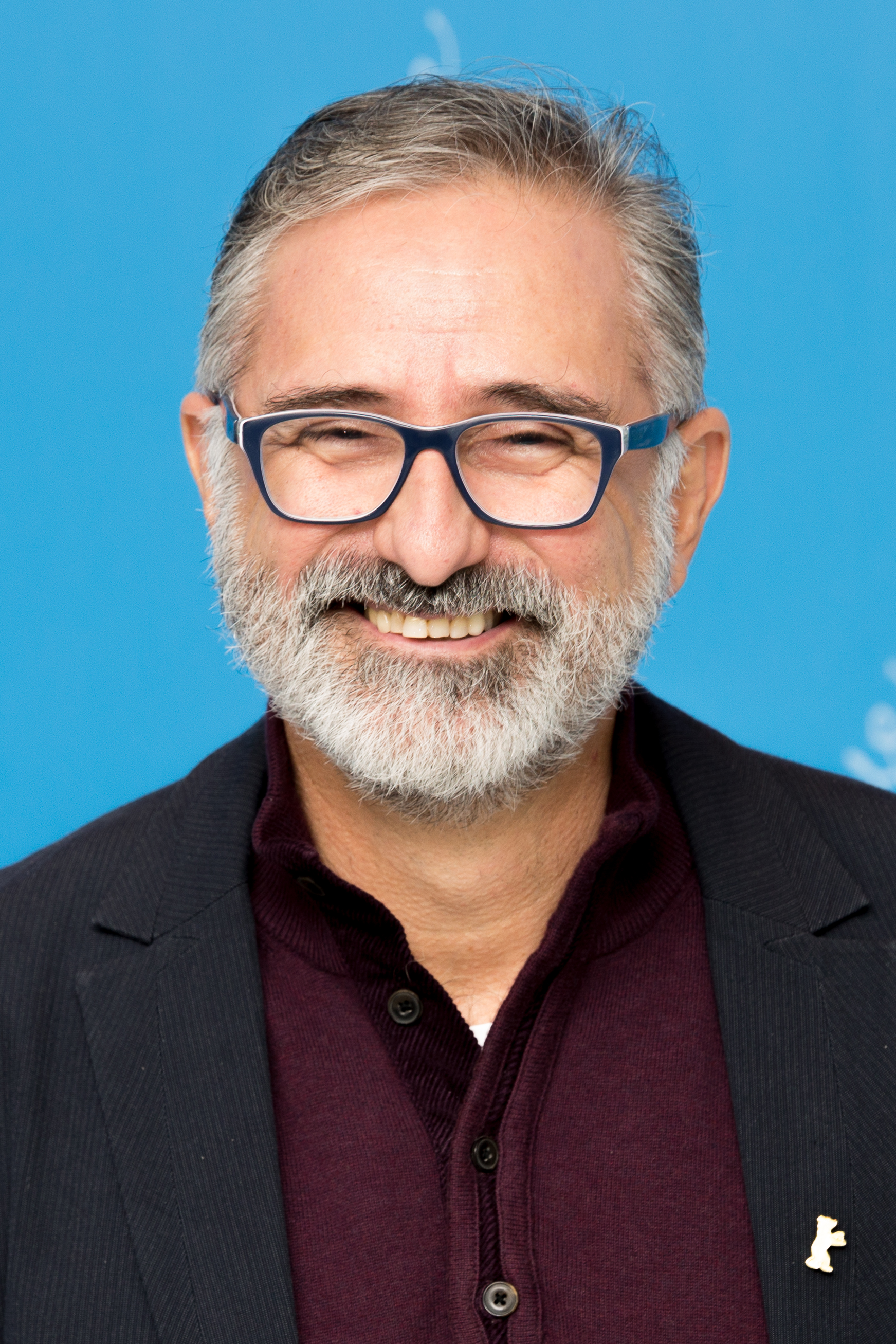
- The brazilian filmmaker Marcelo Gomes presenting Joaquim at Berlinale 2017
- Directed by: Marcelo Gomes
- Written by: Marcelo Gomes
- Produced by: João Vieira, Jr.
- Starring: Julio Machado
- Cinematography: Pierre de Kerchove
- Edited by: Eduardo Chatagnier
- Music by: O Grivo
- Release date: 16 February 2017 (Berlin)
- Running time: 97 minutes
- Country: Brazil
- Language: Portuguese

Joaquim is a 2017 Brazilian drama film directed by Marcelo Gomes. It was selected to compete for the Golden Bear in the main competition section of the 67th Berlin International Film Festival. In 2018, the film won the Havana Star Prize for Best Film, and Gomes for Best Director, at the 19th Havana Film Festival New York.

== Cast ==
- Julio Machado
- Isabél Zuaa
- Nuno Lopes
- Rômulo Braga
- Welket Bungué
- Karay Rya Pua
