= Buddies (2012 film) =

2012 film directed by Marcelo Galvão

- Directed by: Marcelo Galvão
- Written by: Marcelo Galvão
- Starring: Ariel Goldenberg; Rita Pokk; Breno Viola; Lima Duarte; Rui Unas; Deto Montenegro
- Cinematography: Rodrigo Tavares
- Edited by: Marcelo Galvão
- Music by: Ed Côrtes
- Production company: Gatacine
- Distributed by: Europa Filmes
- Release dates: November 8, 2012 (Red Rock Film Festival); March 1, 2013
- Running time: 94 minutes
- Country: Brazil
- Language: Portuguese

Buddies (Portuguese: Colegas) is a 2012 Brazilian adventure-comedy film written and directed by Marcelo Galvão. The film tells the story of three young people with Down syndrome working in the video library of the institute where they live. One day, inspired by the movie Thelma & Louise, they decide to flee in search of new adventures. It was shot in São Paulo, Paulínia, Bertioga, all three in São Paulo, Florianópolis and Laguna, in Santa Catarina, and in Torres, Rio Grande do Sul, as well as in Buenos Aires, Argentina.

== Plot ==
The Portuguese film, Buddies, is about three teenage friends, Stallone, Aninha, and Marcio, who all have Down Syndrome. All three young adults live in an institution with other kids and teenagers who also have Down Syndrome. The film describes these three characters by first addressing how they each arrived at the institution, then goes on to illustrate a day in the life at the institution. Stallone, Aninha, and Marcio all work together in the video library, which is where they found the inspiration to run away. They each had a wish and running away from the institution was the only way their wishes could come true. Stallone wished to see the sea, Aninha wished to get married, and Marcio wished to fly. So, in the middle of the night, the three friends stole a car and set off on their adventure.

While out on their road trip to fulfill their wishes, the gang of friends made a few stops along the way. Shortly after leaving the institution, the friends realized that they were going to have to eat somehow while on their road trip; so, they decided to rob a convenience store in order to eat that night. During this entire road trip, there were two police officers following them, looking to return the three young friends back to the institution. Each stop the friends made during their road trip, they stirred up a little bit of trouble and soon after, the officers were on their tails again. Stallone, Aninha, and Marcio also stopped at a carnival and stole costumes, they stopped at an old woman's house to ask for directions, and they also dined at an expensive restaurant.

Each of the characters saw their wish come true. First, Stallone saw the sea after traveling on a bus. Next, Aninha picked out a wedding dress and got married like she had dreamed of. However, she did not marry a singer like she had originally dreamed of. Instead, she married Stallone. Finally, Marcio flew home in an airplane, after Stallone jumped in front of a bullet for Aninha. The film ends with the groundskeeper telling the story of the three friends to other children at the same institution.

== Promotions ==
=== Online campaign ===
One of the protagonists of the film, Ariel Goldenberg, is a fan of the American actor Sean Penn and wanted to realize the dream of bringing the idol to watch the film's release at his side.

The promotion includes a video where is shown the story of Ariel, who has Down syndrome and has always been a cinema lover. According to the film's publicist, Aleksandra Zakartchouk, "the idea is to make the video becomes a viral and international news, to reach the hands of Sean Penn."

The video features several Brazilian personalities inviting the actor Sean Penn to go to Brazil, including the presenter Otavio Mesquita, actresses Juliana Paes, Gabriela Duarte, Juliana Didone and Tania Khalill, actors Sergio Marone and Lima Duarte, singers Falcão and Rogério Flausino, comedians Marco Luque and Danilo Gentili.

== Release ==
The film was shown at the Red Rock Film Festival on November 8, 2012. It was the feature film that opened the Amazonas Film Festival on November 3, 2012. It will be released in Brazil on March 1, 2013; and is due for UK Theatrical, DVD and Blu-ray release on Mr Bongo.

=== Accolades ===
The film won the 2012 edition of the Festival de Gramado, winning the "Kikito" of Best Feature Film and Best Art Direction, as well as a Special Prize from the Jury, and was elected as the best Brazilian film in public shows of São Paulo International Film Festival.

Awards Group	Category	Recipient	Result
Festival de Gramado	Best Art Direction	Zenor Ribas	Won
Festival de Gramado	Best Film	Marcelo Galvão	Won
Festival de Gramado	Brazilian Film Competition (For the acting)	Breno Viola, Rita Pokk, Ariel Goldenberg	Won
São Paulo International Film Festival	Best Brazilian Film	Marcelo Galvão	Won
São Paulo International Film Festival	Best Dramatic Film	Marcelo Galvão	Won
Trieste Festival of Latin-American Cinema	Best Film	Marcelo Galvão	Won
6th International Disability Film Festival Breaking Down Barriers	Best Film	Marcelo Galvão	Won
