= The Man of the Crowd (film) =

2013 film

- Film poster
- Directed by: Marcelo Gomes; Cao Guimarães
- Written by: Marcelo Gomes; Cao Guimarães
- Based on: "The Man of the Crowd" by Edgar Allan Poe
- Produced by: Beto Magalhães; João Viera Jr.
- Starring: Paulo André
- Cinematography: Ivo Lopes Araújo
- Edited by: Marcelo Gomes; Cao Guimarães; Lucas Sander
- Music by: O Grivo
- Production companies: Cinco em Ponto; Rec Produtores Associados
- Distributed by: Espaço Filmes
- Release date: 29 September 2013 (Festival do Rio)
- Running time: 95 minutes
- Country: Brazil
- Language: Portuguese

The Man of the Crowd (Portuguese: O Homem das Multidões) is a 2013 Brazilian drama film directed by Marcelo Gomes based on the short story of the same name by Edgar Allan Poe. It was entirely shot in Belo Horizonte, Minas Gerais with a budget of R$1.8 million. The film was screened in the Panorama section of the 64th Berlin International Film Festival.

== Cast ==
- Paulo André as Juvenal
- Sílvia Lourenço as Margo
- Jean-Claude Bernardet
