= Villas-Bôas brothers =

Brazilian activists

Orlando (1914–2002) and his brothers Cláudio (1916–1998) and Leonardo Villas-Bôas (1918–1961) were Brazilian brothers who worked in indigenous activism. In 1961 they succeeded in getting the entire upper Xingu legally protected, making it the first massive indigenous area in all South America, and the prototype for dozens of similar reserves all over the continent.

== Pioneers ==
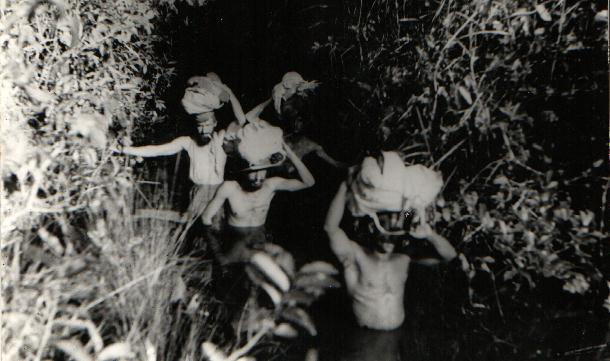
The expedition of the Villas-Bôas brothers to the territory of the Kalapalo tribe in the 1940s

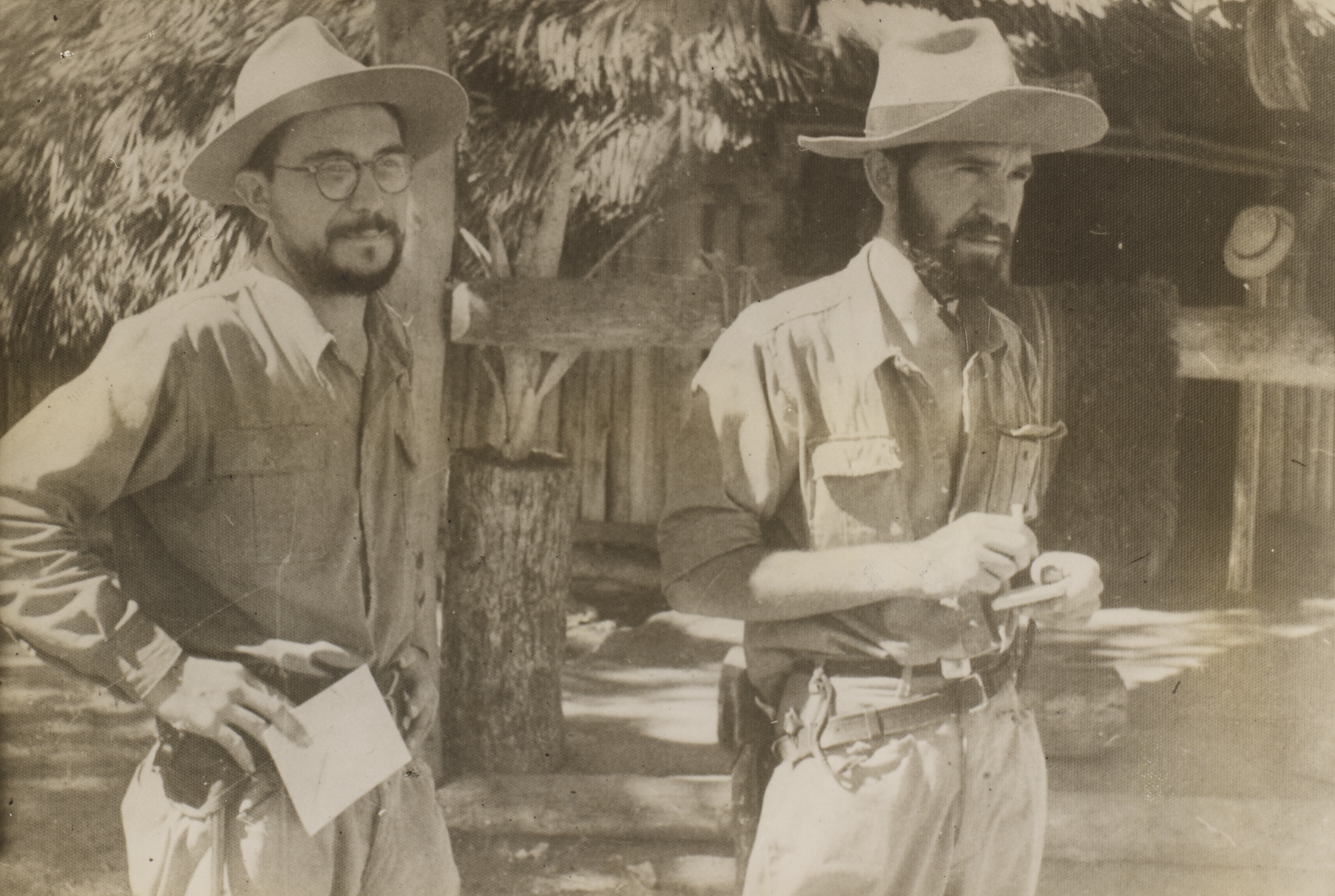
Cláudio and Orlando Villas-Bôas, 1948

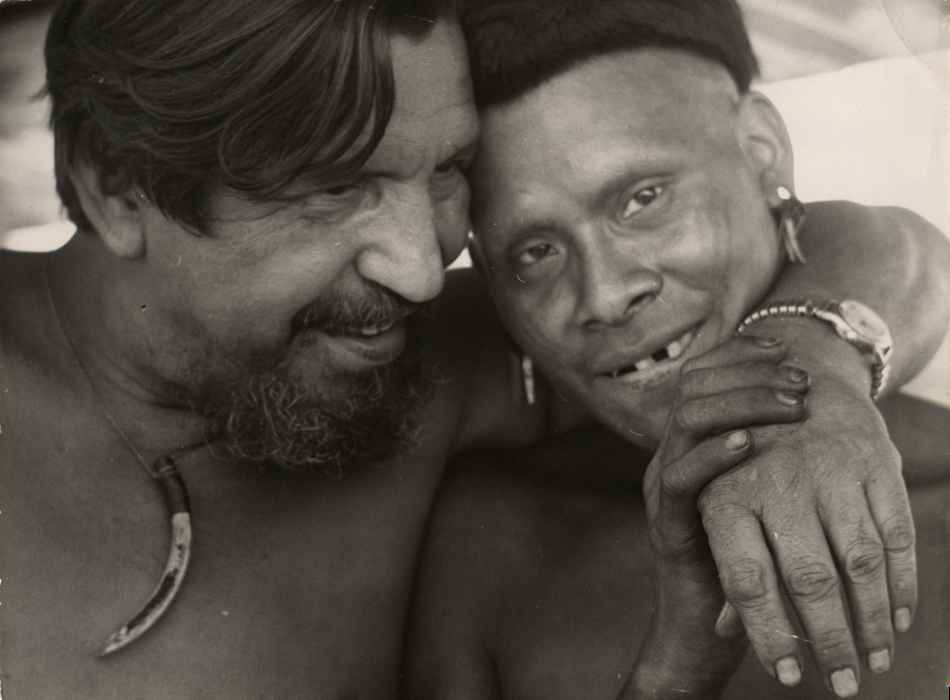
Orlando with a man from the Ikpeng tribe in Matto Grosso, 1967

The explorer John Hemming wrote that the Villas-Bôas were pioneers in many ways. They were almost the first non-missionaries to live permanently with the natives; and they treated them as their equals and friends. They persuaded tribes to end internecine feuds and unite to confront the encroaching settlement frontier. The Villas-Bôas were the first to appreciate the value of politics and the media in furthering the indigenous cause. They also devised a policy of "change, but only at the speed the Indians want".

In the 1950s, Brazilian explorer and defender of indigenous people, Cândido Rondon, supported the Villas-Bôas brothers' campaign, which faced strong opposition from the government and the ranchers of Mato Grosso and led to the establishment of the first Brazilian National Park for indigenous people along the Xingu River in 1961.

Robin Hanbury-Tenison, from Survival International, wrote in 1971 that "The Xingu is the only closed park in Brazil, which means that it is the only area in which Indians are safe from deliberate or accidental contact with undesirable representatives of Western civilization. This is due entirely to the Villas-Bôas brothers and the total dedication of their lives to this work over the last 25 years." Since 1971, more indigenous parks and reserves have been created, such as the Tumucumaque National Park (38,800 km^{2}) in northern Pará state, but the Xingu park (26,400 km^{2}) remains the most important of them.

The anthropologist Shelton Davis wrote that "The Villas-Bôas brothers further argued that it was the responsibility of the federal government to provide a secure protective buffer, in the form of closed Indian parks and reserves, between Indians and the frontiers of national society. In time, the three brothers believed, Indians would integrate into Brazilian national society. This process of integration, however, should be a gradual one and should guarantee the Indians’s survival, ethnic identities and ways of life."

In the foreword of the book Xingu: the Indians, Their Myths the anthropologist Kenneth S. Brecher wrote that

It is now almost 30 years since the Villas-Bôas brothers (...) led the expedition known as 'Brazil's march to the West' which was intended to open up the heart of the interior for colonization. They were overwhelmed by the beauty and cultural richness of the network of Xingu tribes which they discovered, and when the expedition disbanded they remained in the jungle to protect the Xinguanos from the land speculators, state senators, diamond prospectors, skin hunters, and rubber gatherers who had followed in their wake. (...) That the Xingu tribes continue to exist, in fact to thrive, is due largely to the extreme dedication, intelligence, cunning, and physical strength of these brothers.

== Personal lives and deaths ==
Of the 11 siblings, the three brothers banded together in their pioneering work, later supported by their younger brother Alvaro.

Orlando died in 2002. When a major chief dies, the Xingu Indians hold a great funerary festival (the Kuarup) in his honour. They did this for Orlando even though he was white. He had two sons, Noel and Orlando.

Claudio was born on December 8, 1916, in Botucatu, São Paulo and died of a stroke in his São Paulo apartment on March 1, 1998. Indians called him "The Father" and by 1994 there were 6000 Indians in 18 settlements from different tribes.

Leonardo died in 1961 at age 43.

Álvaro was born 1926 in São Paulo and worked with his brothers in the Xingu area from 1961 to 1962. He then settled in São Paulo, where he provided logistical support to his brothers' missions in the country's interior. He assumed the presidency of FUNAI (Fundação Nacional do Índio) for a short period in 1985. Died in Bauru, São Paulo, on August 22, 1995.

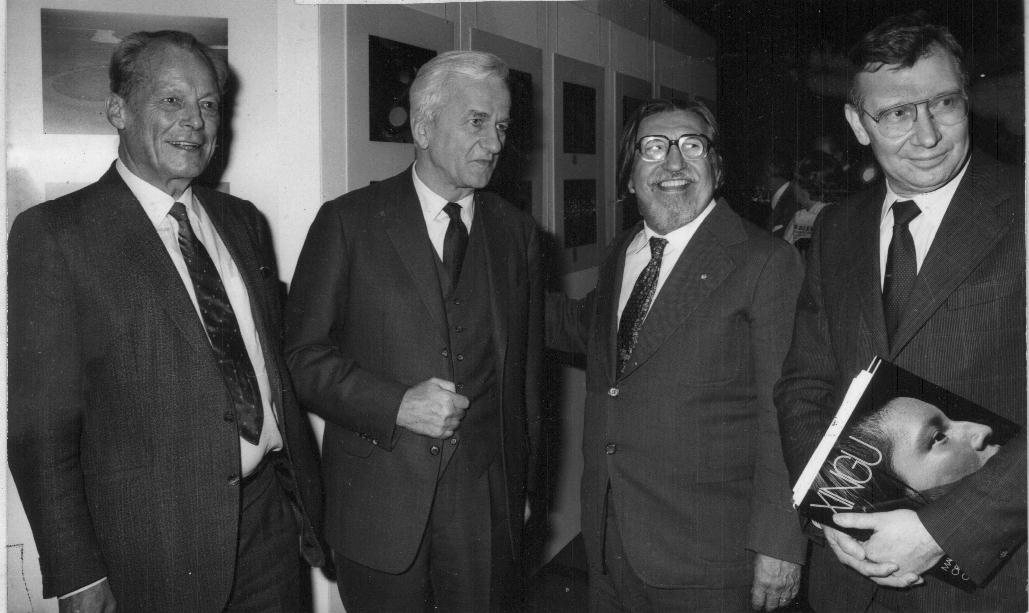
Willy Brandt, Richard von Weizsäcker, and Orlando Villas Bôas, 1984

== Awards and legacy ==
Two of the Villas-Bôas brothers, Orlando and Cláudio, were jointly awarded the Royal Geographical Society’s gold medal in 1967, as much for their geographical explorations as for their humanitarian work. They also received the GEO prize from the president of Germany, Richard von Weizsäcker and the ex-Chancellor of West Germany Willy Brandt in 1984, in recognition of their humanitarian work. The two were twice nominated for the Nobel Peace Prize in 1971 and again in 1975.

Matupá Airport, in Matupá, Mato Grosso, Brazil is named after the brother Orlando.

The Villas-Bôas brothers are the main protagonists in Cao Hamburger's 2012 film Xingu.

In April 2014 the Brazilian graffiti artist Speto created an extensive artwork dedicated to the Villas-Bôas titled 3 Brothers on 14 concrete pillars of the elevated metro track of Krieau station in Vienna commissioned by Wiener Linien and KÖR Kunst im öffentlichen Raum. Honoring the brothers' legacy, Speto painted characters from Brazilian mythology like Boitatá, Iara or Boto and tribal pattern designs on the pillars of the subway line. To this end he employed graphic styles of the Brazilian Literatura de Cordel.

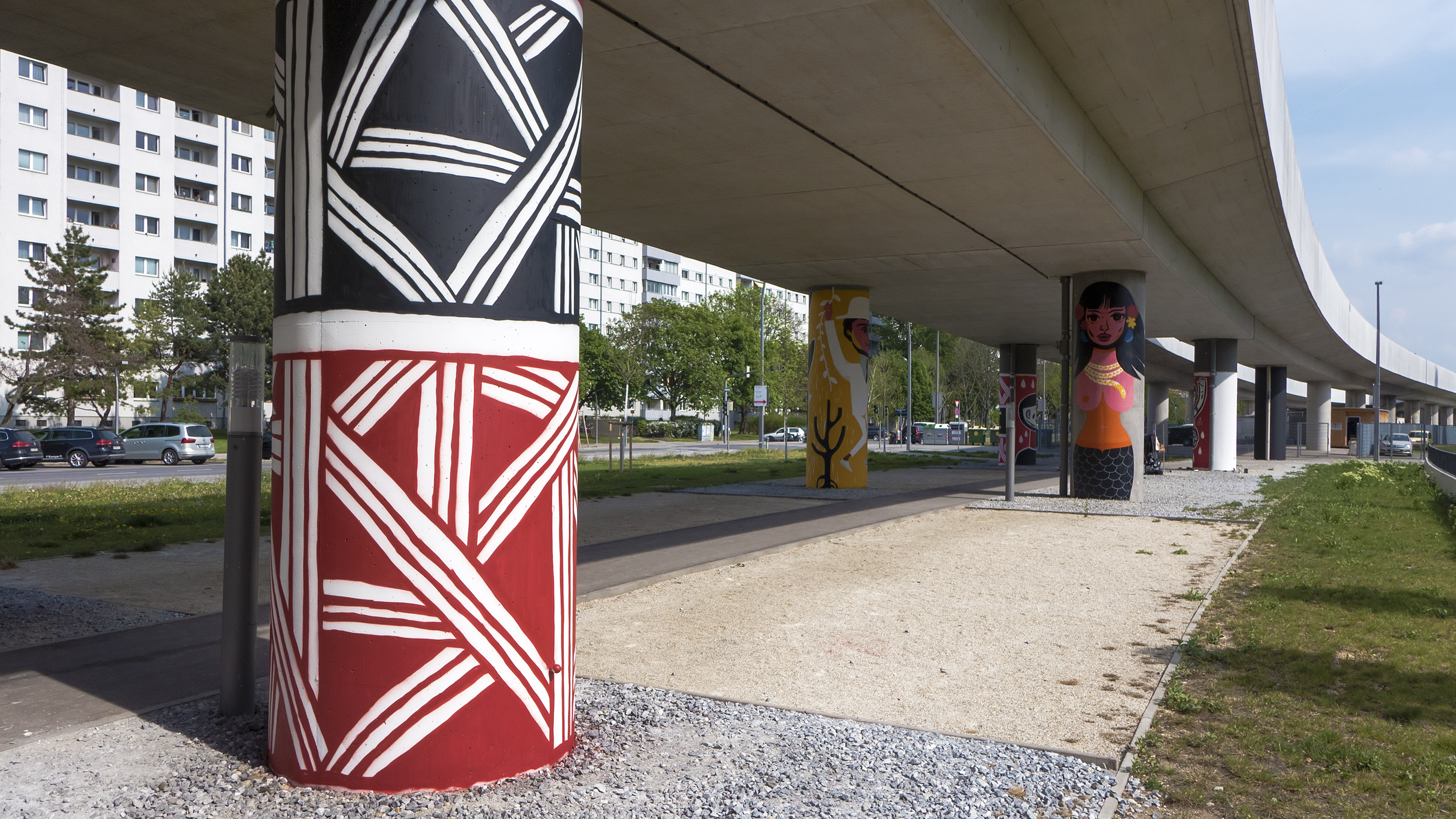
Murals of 3 Brothers in Vienna

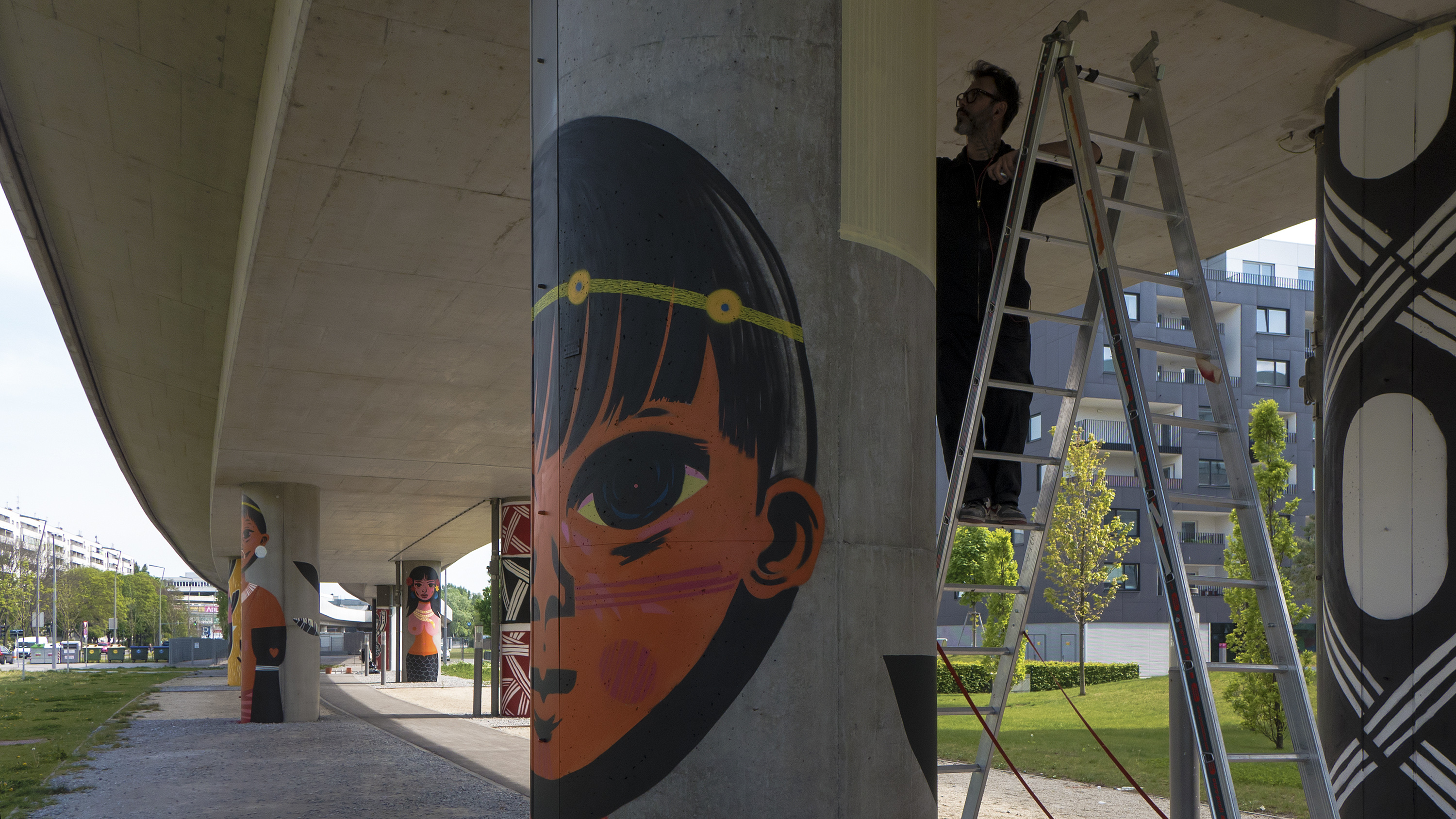
Speto working on the painting of a Matsés child

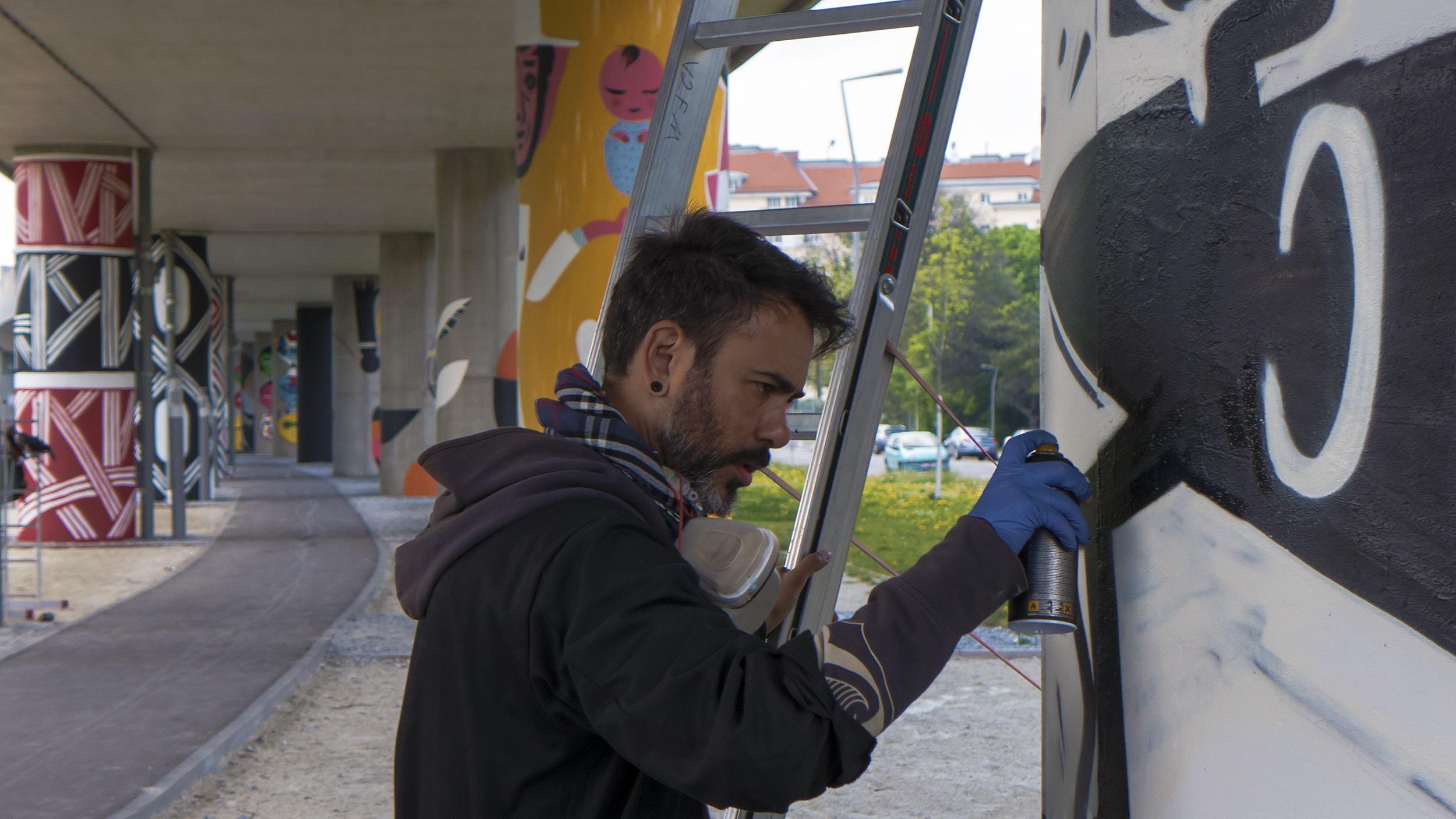
Speto spray painting details

== See also ==
- Sydney Possuelo
- Xingu Indigenous Park
- Indigenous peoples in Brazil
- Indigenous territory (Brazil)
