= Pau Brasil (film) =

2009 film directed by Fernando Belens

- Theatrical release poster
- Directed by: Fernando Belens
- Written by: Fernando Belens; Dinorath do Valle
- Produced by: Sylvia Abreu; Luciano Floquet
- Starring: Bertrand Duarte; Osvaldo Mil; Fernanda Paquelet; Arany Santana
- Cinematography: Hamilton Oliveira
- Edited by: André Bendocchi-Alves
- Music by: Bira Reis
- Production companies: Truque Produtora de Cinema; Studio Brasil; 40° Filmproduktion
- Distributed by: Caliban Cinema e Conteúdo
- Release dates: 6 October 2009 (FPCBL); 24 April 2014 (Brazil)
- Running time: 98 minutes
- Country: Brazil
- Language: Portuguese

Pau Brasil is a 2009 Brazilian drama film, the first feature film by director Fernando Belens, an experienced short filmmaker, with about 20 short films made since the 70s.

The film was screened at various film festivals, including the Mostra do Filme Livre, Mostra Internacional de São Paulo, the Panorama Internacional Coisa de Cinema and the Los Angeles Brazilian Film Festival. Although it was completed in 2009, Pau Brasil only managed to reach the Brazilian commercial circuit in April 2014.

== Cast ==
- Bertrand Duarte as Nives
- Osvaldo Mil as Joaquim
- Fernanda Paquelet as Juraci
- Arany Santana as Leandra
