= Klinikum Berlin Mitte – Leben in Bereitschaft =

- Country of origin: Germany

Klinikum Berlin Mitte – Leben in Bereitschaft is a German television series.

== See also ==
- List of German television series
