= 2005 Indaiatuba tornado =

2005 tornado in Brazil

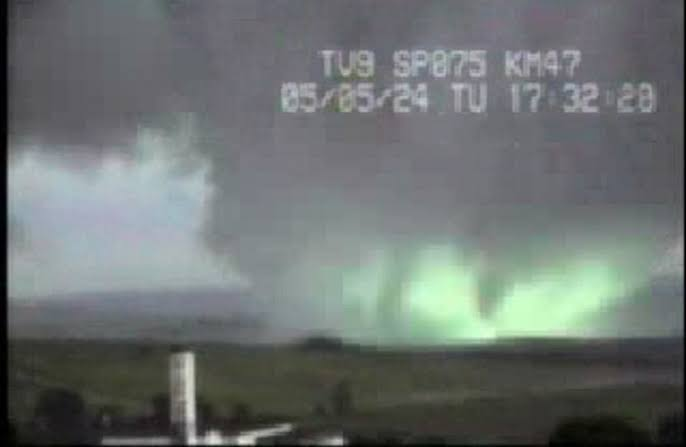
- The tornado travelling through rural areas.

Meteorological history
- Date: May 24, 2005
- Duration: 30 minutes

F3 tornado
- on the Fujita scale
- Highest winds: >160 mph (260 km/h)

Overall effects
- Fatalities: 3
- Injuries: ≥10
- Damage: ~R$97,200,000 (~$261,910,000 in 2020 BRL)
- Areas affected: Indaiatuba, Itatiba
- Part of the Tornadoes of 2005

The 2005 Indaiatuba Brazil tornado was a strong F3 multi-vortex wedge tornado that struck the city of Indaiatuba in São Paulo, Brazil, on May 24, 2005. The tornado caused damage estimated at R$97.2 million (BRL), which caused the government to declare a state of emergency. At the time, it was thought to be the first multi-vortex tornado to be recorded in the Southern Hemisphere. This tornado was unofficially rated F4 by some studies, however, this rating is not accepted officially, being frequently associated with an F3 rating.

== Synoptic setup ==
An unusually severe cold front that moved through the state of São Paulo produced severe thunderstorms and several tornadoes across the state. The tornado was classified as an F3 after the damage survey.

The event occurred on a Tuesday afternoon. It left a wide swath of severe damage through the industrial district of the municipality.

Another severe and significant tornado was confirmed in the municipality of Itatiba, but the event never got rated.

== Damage ==
Three high-voltage towers were destroyed by the tornado in an area not far from the Toyota building. In all, 220 utility poles were toppled and damaged, while schools, health posts, and part of the city hall were also heavily damaged or destroyed. At least 400 houses were damaged or destroyed as well; and strong winds knocked down walls, roofs, metal structures, poles, sheds, and trees.

Continuing its destructive path through the city, the tornado hit the neighborhoods Esplanada, Pau Preto, Remulo Zoppi, Cecap, Jardim Renata, Mercedes, Oliveira Camargo and Pimenta. However, the Industrial District was the hardest hit neighborhood. Several warehouses were severely damaged or destroyed, and the tornado lofted parts of the roofs of several structures, which were found at a distance of up to three kilometers away. Debris from structures was found strewn across the Santos Dumont highway as well. There were at least 400 companies in the industrial district, of which 15 were totally destroyed. In addition, all 720 companies lost electricity as a result of the tornado. The force of the wind knocked down and derailed 18 wagons that were empty and parked on the Ferroban lines in the Pimenta neighborhood, with each wagon weighing approximately 25 tons. The buildings of the National Industrial Service (SENAI) were destroyed by the tornado, which dismantled the gate, and scattered debris throughout the area. Trees were uprooted and large fences were toppled over in this area as well. The tornado continued past this area some distance before dissipating.

== Victims ==
At least 60 people were left homeless, of which 35 were sent by the City Hall to the Maria Benedita Municipal School in Jardim Morada do Sol. The rest went to relatives' homes.

== Other events ==
There were also multiple other tornadoes confirmed by Civil Defense in other municipalities in São Paulo during the afternoon and evening of the same day.

In Itatiba, a very severe unrated tornado occurred during the night, but with an intensity presumed to be F2. The phenomenon left around 230 people homeless and hundreds of homes destroyed, in addition to throwing vehicles several meters away. There were also records of two other tornadoes in the municipalities of Capivari and Bragança Paulista, with 1 death reported.

In addition to these events, there were several severe thunderstorms with damaging wind gusts in several municipalities of São Paulo during the afternoon and evening of the day, causing great damage.
