= Matupá =

Coordinates: 10°03′25″S 54°55′58″W

- Municipality
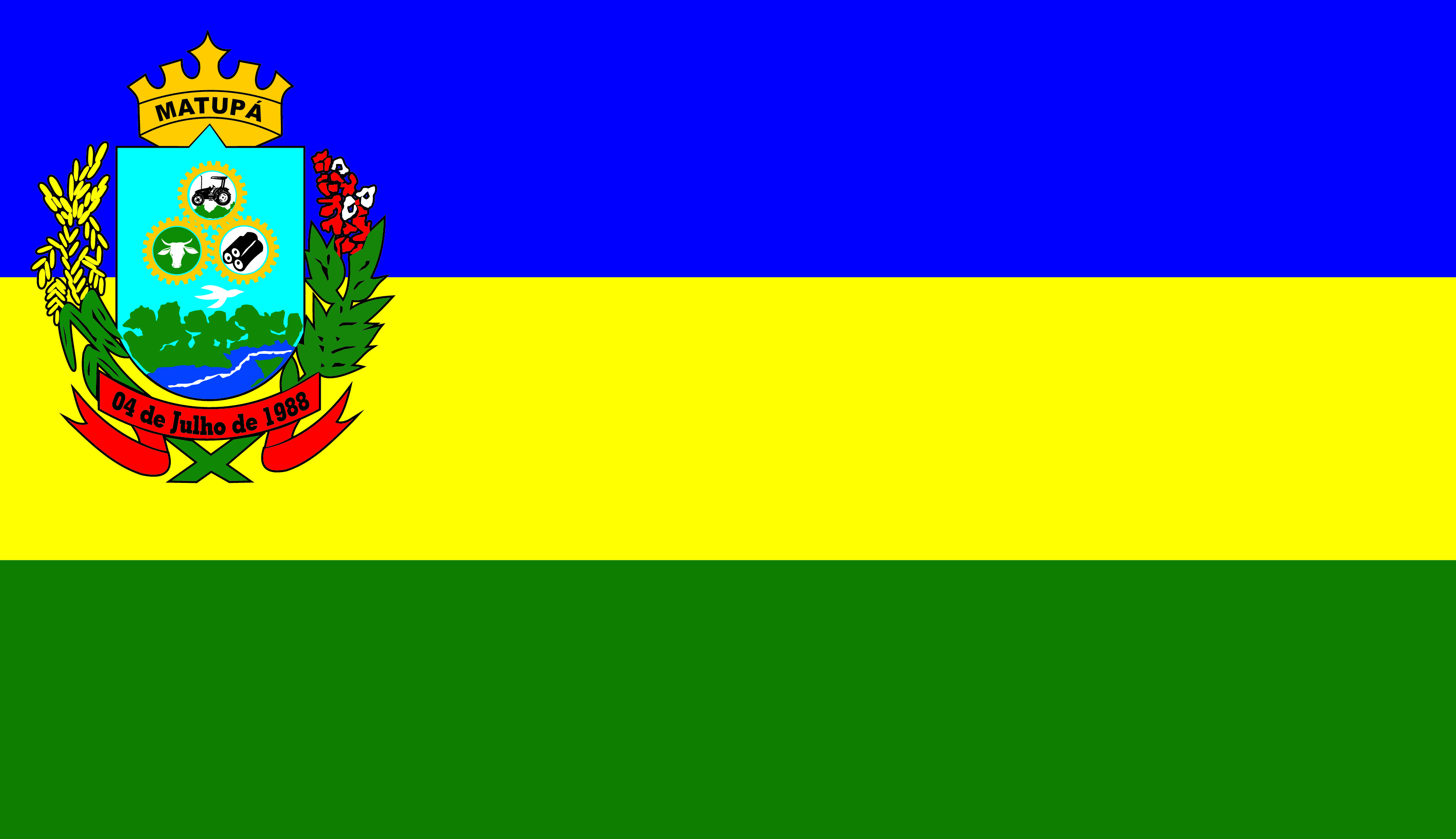
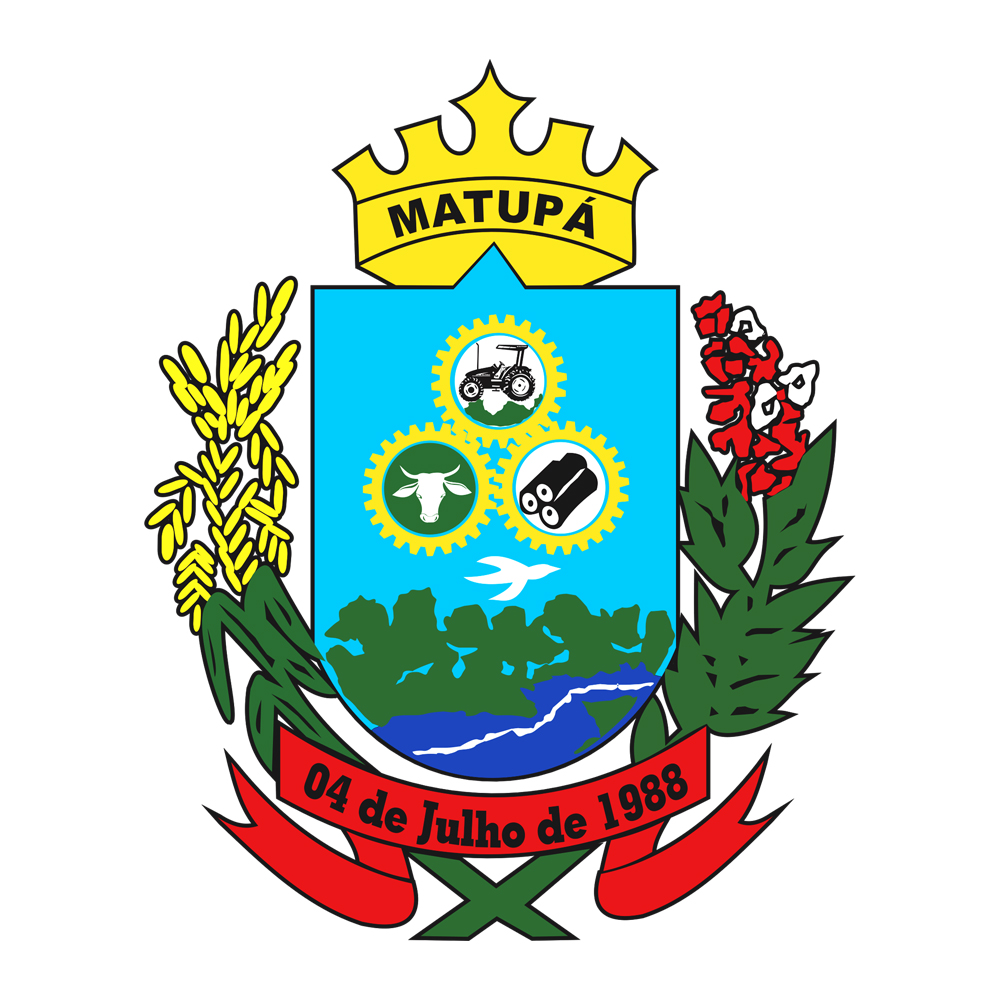
- Flag Coat of arms

- Country: Brazil
- Region: Center-West
- State: Mato Grosso
- Mesoregion: Norte Mato-Grossense

Population (2020)
  - Total: 16,793
- Time zone: UTC−4 (BRT)

Matupá is a municipality in the state of Mato Grosso in the Central-West Region of Brazil.

The city is served by Orlando Villas-Bôas Regional Airport.

== History ==
On 23 July 2024, a private Learjet 35, registration PP-EER, crashed inside an eucalyptus plantation, in the municipality, killing the two crew members on board.

== Climate ==
Climate data for Matupá (1991–2020)
Month	Jan	Feb	Mar	Apr	May	Jun	Jul	Aug	Sep	Oct	Nov	Dec	Year
Mean daily maximum °C (°F)	31.2 (88.2)	31.2 (88.2)	31.4 (88.5)	32.0 (89.6)	32.5 (90.5)	33.2 (91.8)	34.3 (93.7)	35.8 (96.4)	35.1 (95.2)	33.5 (92.3)	32.3 (90.1)	31.4 (88.5)	32.8 (91.0)
Daily mean °C (°F)	25.0 (77.0)	24.9 (76.8)	25.1 (77.2)	25.5 (77.9)	25.4 (77.7)	24.7 (76.5)	24.6 (76.3)	26.0 (78.8)	26.5 (79.7)	26.0 (78.8)	25.7 (78.3)	25.2 (77.4)	25.4 (77.7)
Mean daily minimum °C (°F)	21.2 (70.2)	21.1 (70.0)	21.2 (70.2)	21.1 (70.0)	20.3 (68.5)	18.1 (64.6)	16.8 (62.2)	18.0 (64.4)	20.3 (68.5)	21.3 (70.3)	21.4 (70.5)	21.3 (70.3)	20.2 (68.4)
Average precipitation mm (inches)	324.6 (12.78)	308.0 (12.13)	316.6 (12.46)	164.1 (6.46)	36.1 (1.42)	6.6 (0.26)	4.3 (0.17)	15.4 (0.61)	90.9 (3.58)	179.5 (7.07)	215.4 (8.48)	338.8 (13.34)	2,000.3 (78.75)
Average relative humidity (%)	75.5	74.7	71.2	69.1	72.5	72.7	65.7	58.4	60.4	65.7	65.7	71.6	68.6
Mean monthly sunshine hours	142.3	114.0	127.6	165.6	229.8	279.0	291.7	230.8	152.9	184.4	154.3	136.9	2,209.3
Source: Instituto Nacional de Meteorologia (precipiation 1981–2010)

== See also ==
- List of municipalities in Mato Grosso
