= Another Forever =

- Directed by: Juan Zapata
- Written by: Juan Zapata; Daniela Escobar
- Produced by: Douglas Limbach; Daél Linke; Juan Zapata; Daniela Escobar
- Starring: Daniela Escobar; Marlon Moreno; Peter Ketnath; Barbara Scolaro
- Cinematography: Pablo Chasseraux
- Edited by: Lisi Kieling & Onon
- Music by: Jon Kahn
- Production company: Zapata Filmes Ltda
- Distributed by: Latinopolis Films
- Release date: December 2016
- Running time: 72 minutes
- Countries: Brazil; Colombia
- Language: English

Another Forever is a 2016 Brazilian drama film directed by Juan Zapata, co–written by Juan Zapata and Daniela Escobar, and starring Daniela Escobar, Marlon Moreno, Peter Ketnath and Barbara Scolaro, in lead roles. Originally titled Butterflies, the name was changed to Another Forever in May, 2016. The film is about a grieving woman who makes a spontaneous trip abroad to visit a friend and get her life back on track. It was filmed in Austria, Germany, the Netherlands, Brazil and the United States and was a co-production between Zapata Filmes (Brazil) and Ley em Movimiento (Colombia).

== Plot ==
Alice's life had been filled with great joy and bitter disappointment. She persevered because of the love she shared with one man, a man that made it all worthwhile, until the unthinkable happens. Completely shattered, Alice embarks on a journey to find herself in which she experiences the depths of despair and the wonders of the world. In the process, Alice reclaims her life and rediscovers her soul.

== Production ==
This project came to life after an exchange of ideas between the protagonist Daniela Escobar and director Juan Zapata at the Gramado Film Festival. Both felt it was important to portray a woman's point of view when dealing with the challenge of moving on after a devastating loss. They teamed up with Colombian actor Marlon Moreno.

Another Forever is a fictional Drama with a Documentary-esque feel. The director used this hybrid style of shooting in his last feature film Simone. Cinematographer Pablo Chasseraux, who also worked on Simone, joined the team as well.

Another Forever is a co-production between Zapata Films Ltda. (Brazil) and Ley en Movimiento (Colombia). It was filmed in Los Angeles, Amsterdam, Rio de Janeiro, Salzburg and Munich.

== Distribution ==
Another Forever was first Distributed in Ecuador in December 2016, followed by Brazil in March 2017 in the City of Porto Alegre at Cinemateca Paulo Amorim in Casa de Cultura Mario Quintana.

Another Forever has been available on NETFLIX Worldwide since March 21 and is now available in over 227 Countries.

== Awards ==
Los Angeles Independent Film Festival - August 2016

- Won: Best Foreign Feature - August 2016

69th Cannes Film Festival - Marché du Film

- Selection: Guadalajara Goes to Cannes(Work in Progress Screening) at K on Tuesday May 17, 2016.
