= Dark Sea =

2013 film directed by Rodrigo Aragão

- Promotional release poster
- Directed by: Rodrigo Aragão
- Screenplay by: Rodrigo Aragão
- Starring: Mayra Alarcón; Carol Aragão; Ana Carolina Braga; Kika de Oliveira; Walderrama Dos Santos; Tiago Ferri; Gurcius Gewdner
- Distributed by: Petrini Filmes
- Release date: October 28, 2013 (Festival de Vitória)
- Running time: 105 minutes
- Country: Brazil
- Language: Portuguese
- Budget: R$ 300,000

Dark Sea (Portuguese: Mar Negro) is a 2013 Brazilian horror film directed by Rodrigo Aragão. The film was premiered at Festival de Vitória on October 28, 2013.

== Plot ==
A black spot appears on the shores of a small village in Brazil, bringing a strange disease that transforms sea animals into predatory killers. To survive and save his beloved, Albino risks his life and soul to confront the monsters.
