= Ksis =

Brazilian pop/rock singer duo

Ksis is a Brazilian pop/rock singer duo composed of identical twin sisters, Keyla and Kenya Boaventura (b. 1982, Minas Gerais, Brazil). Following the release of two albums, in 2005 and 2007, they changed name to Cassis.

== Career ==
Their debut album, entitled Ksis, was released in Brazil on 18 October 2005 by EMI International music label. A number of singles from the album were released including "Tem Dias", "Beijos, Blues e Poesia" and "Reflexões no Espelho". First single "Tem Dias" was a chart success within Brazil. Following single "Beijos, Blues e Poesia" was also popular and featured on the soundtrack of TV series Malhação.

Their second album, Amores Cruzados, was released in 2007 also on EMI.

=== Television ===
As of 2006 the sisters are VJ's on MTV Brasil. Keyla and Kênya host Disk MTV (Brazilian version for TRL) and Top 20 Brasil.

== Discography ==
=== Albums ===
- KSIS (2005, EMI)
- Amores Cruzados (2007, EMI)

=== Singles ===
- "Tem Dias" (2005)
- "Beijos, Blues e Poesia" (2006)
- "Reflexões no Espelho"
