= Jornal de Brasília =

Brazilian daily newspaper

- Information and Opinion. From Brasília, for Brasília
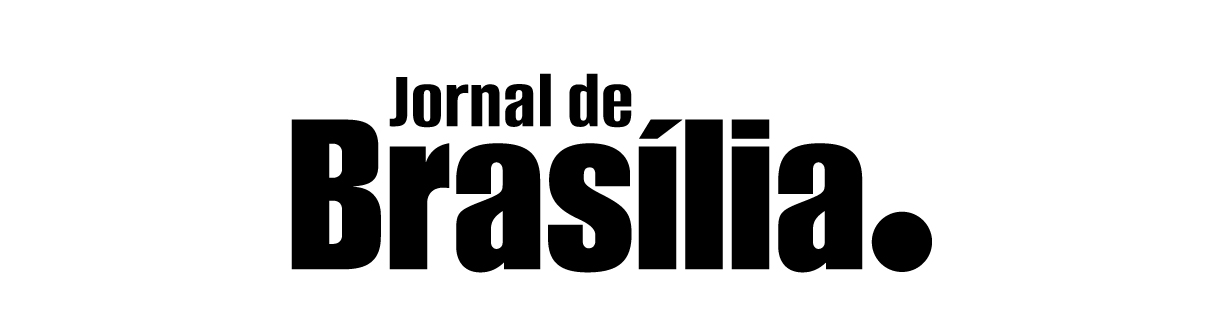
- Type: Daily newspaper
- Format: Berliner
- Owner: Grupo JBr de Comunicação
- Founder: Jaime Câmara Organization
- Publisher: Editora Jornal de Brasília Ltda.
- Founded: 10 December 1972; 53 years ago
- Language: Portuguese
- Headquarters: Brasília, Federal District, Brazil
- Circulation: Federal District

Jornal de Brasília is a Brazilian daily newspaper based in Brasília, the capital of Brazil. Founded on 10 December 1972 by the Jaime Câmara Organization, it is one of the most prominent newspapers in the Federal District.

The newspaper is owned by Grupo JBr de Comunicação, which also operates the newspaper Na Hora H! and the Portal JBr news website.

== History ==
Jornal de Brasília was founded on 10 December 1972 during the period of the Brazilian military dictatorship. Its original slogan was Onde a Cidade é Notícia ("Where the City Is News"), reflecting its focus on local news and coverage of Brasília and its satellite cities.

The newspaper quickly established itself as a competitor to major Brazilian newspapers such as Correio Braziliense and Jornal do Brasil.

According to the Fundação Getulio Vargas' Centre for Research and Documentation of Contemporary Brazilian History (CPDOC), the newspaper's founders publicly supported the military government's goals of "democracy, development and security".

In 1975, Jornal de Brasília received the Esso Journalism Award, becoming the first newspaper outside the Rio de Janeiro–São Paulo axis to win the distinction.

During the 2000s, the newspaper underwent editorial modernization, adopting a more direct writing style and strengthening its focus on local and popular-interest reporting.

Like many print newspapers, Jornal de Brasília experienced declining circulation as audiences increasingly migrated to digital platforms. By the mid-2010s, the company had begun prioritizing digital publishing and social media distribution.

In April 2016, the newspaper laid off approximately half of its newsroom staff amid financial difficulties and suspended weekend editions.

== Ownership ==
The newspaper was originally owned by businessman and politician Jaime Câmara.

In the early 2000s, ownership was transferred to Grupo EQM. In 2007, businessman Marcos Pereira Lombardi acquired the newspaper and incorporated it into Grupo JBr de Comunicação.

== Content and operations ==
The newspaper covers local news, politics, economics, culture, sports, entertainment, national affairs and international events. Throughout its history, the publication has maintained a strong emphasis on reporting developments within the Federal District and the Brasília metropolitan region.

== Digital expansion ==
In 2006, the newspaper launched Clicabrasília, an online news portal providing free access to content from the print edition as well as digital-exclusive reporting.

The publication later expanded its digital operations through social media platforms and mobile distribution channels. According to academic research, the website exceeded one million monthly visits by 2016.

== Awards ==
- Esso Journalism Award (1975)
- Engenho de Comunicação Award – Best Print Publication (2013)
- PaulOOctavio Journalism Award (2014)

== See also ==
- Correio Braziliense
- Media of Brazil
