= They'll Come Back =

2012 film directed by Marcelo Lordello

- Theatrical release poster
- Directed by: Marcelo Lordello
- Written by: Marcelo Lordello
- Produced by: Marilha Assis; Mannuela Costa
- Starring: Maria Luiza Tavares; Geórgio Kokkosi; Elayne de Moura; Mauricéia Conceição
- Cinematography: Ivo Lopes Araújo
- Edited by: Eduardo Serrano
- Music by: Caçapa
- Production company: Trincheira Filmes
- Distributed by: Vitrine Filmes
- Release date: September 19, 2012
- Running time: 100 minutes
- Country: Brazil
- Language: Portuguese
- Budget: R$ 247,000

They'll Come Back (Portuguese: Eles Voltam) is a 2012 Brazilian drama film directed by Marcelo Lordello. Lordello's directorial debut, it received the award for best film at the 45th Festival de Brasília do Cinema Brasileiro.

== Plot ==
Cris (Maria Luíza Tavares) and Peu (Georgio Kokkosi), her older brother, are left on the side of a road by their own parents. The brothers were punished for fighting constantly during a trip to the beach. After a few hours, realizing that their parents will not return, Peu part in search of a gas station. Cris remains in place for a whole day and, without news of her parents or brother, decides to go by herself the way back home.

== Cast ==
- Maria Luiza Tavares as Cris
- Geórgio Kokkosi as Peu
- Elayne de Moura as Elayne
- Mauricéia Conceição as Fátima
- Jéssica Gomes de Brito as Jennifer
- Irma Brown as Pri
- Germano Haiut as Grandfather
- Teresa Costa Rêgo as Grandma
- Clara Oliveira as Geórgia
