= Riocorrente =

2013 film directed by Paulo Sacramento

- Theatrical release poster
- Directed by: Paulo Sacramento
- Written by: Paulo Sacramento
- Starring: Simone Iliescu; Lee Taylor; Roberto Audio; Vinicius Dos Anjos
- Cinematography: Aloysio Raulino
- Edited by: Idê Lacreta; Paulo Sacramento
- Music by: Paulo Beto
- Production company: Olhos de Cão
- Distributed by: California Filmes
- Release dates: September 2013 (Festival de Brasília); April 11, 2014 (Brazil)
- Country: Brazil
- Language: Portuguese

Riocorrente is a 2013 Brazilian drama film written and directed by Paulo Sacramento. The film debuted at the 46th Festival de Brasília in September 2013, where it received the awards for best editing and best cinematography, then at the 37th São Paulo International Film Festival in October 2013, it was chosen as the best Brazilian Film according to criticism Abraccine.

== Plot ==
Carlos, Renata and Marcelo form a love triangle contextualized in the chaotic routine of a metropolis like São Paulo. Carlos tries to look after the kid Exu, but he spends all day on the streets of the city.

== Cast ==
- Simone Iliescu as Renata
- Lee Taylor as Carlos
- Roberto Audio as Marcelo
- Vinicius Dos Anjos as Exu
