= Orlando Villas-Bôas =

Brazilian explorer and indigenous rights advocate (1914–2002)

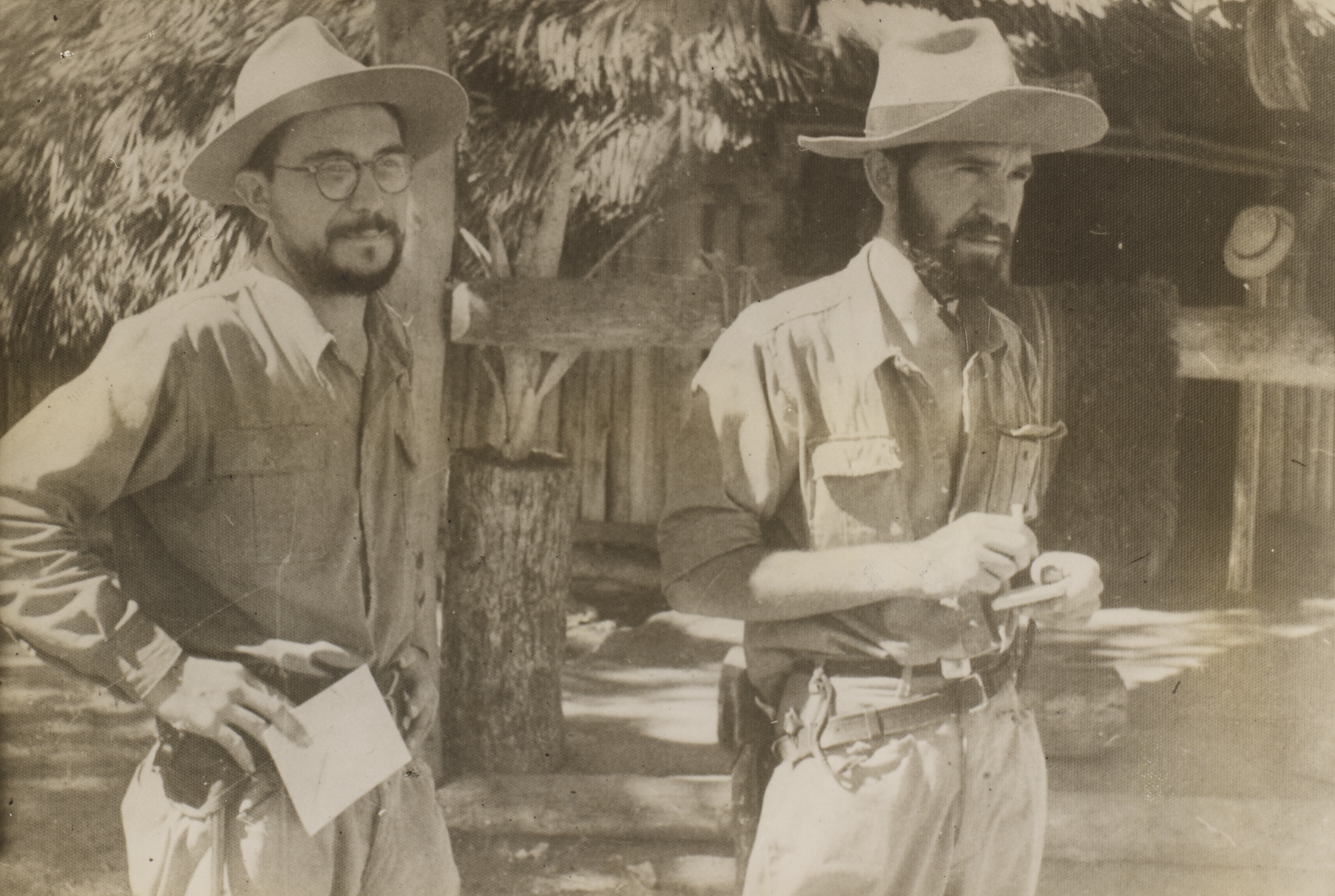
- Orlando Villas-Bôas in 1948
- Born: 12 January 1914; Santa Cruz do Rio Pardo, São Paulo, Brazil
- Died: 12 December 2002 (aged 88); São Paulo, Brazil
- Occupations: Explorer, anthropologist
- Spouse: Marina Villas-Bôas
- Children: 2

Orlando Villas-Bôas (12 January 1914 – 12 December 2002) was a Brazilian explorer, anthropologist, and advocate for the protection of indigenous communities.

== Early life ==
Villas-Bôas was born in Santa Cruz do Rio Pardo, in the state of São Paulo, as one of nine siblings. His family moved to the state capital when he was a teenager, and he initially worked as a clerk before joining an expedition into the Brazilian interior. In 1943, Orlando and his brothers Cláudio en Leonardo participated in the Roncador-Xingu expedition, an initiative to map and open routes into central Brazil, which at the time remained largely inaccessible from the coast.

== Exploration and indigenous advocacy ==
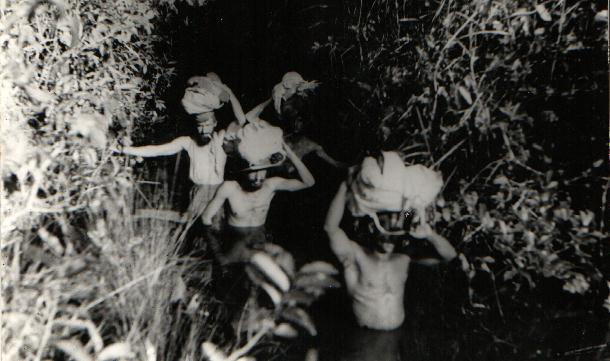
The expedition of the Villas-Bôas brothers to the territory of the Kalapalo tribe in the 1940s

During the Roncador-Xingu expedition, which lasted 17 years, the Villas-Bôas brothers helped open over 1,000 miles of jungle trails, chart six previously unmapped rivers, and establish airstrips to consolidate federal control over the interior. They came into contact with numerous indigenous groups, adopting the nonviolent principles of explorer Marshal Rondon, expressed in the motto “Die, if need be. Kill, never.” The expedition eventually facilitated the creation of dozens of settlements and direct contact with many indigenous tribes.

Concerned about the impacts of outside contact, Orlando and his brothers advocated for a protected territory to safeguard local communities. Their efforts led to the establishment of the Xingu Indigenous Park in 1961, the country's first federally protected indigenous territory. The park encompassed an area of approximately 26,000 square kilometres (10,000 square miles). Villas-Bôas became the park's first director and, assisted by health teams, helped implement vaccination programmes.

== Later life and death ==
Villas-Bôas and his brother Cláudio were nominated twice for the Nobel Peace Prize, in 1971 and 1975, for their work on behalf of indigenous peoples. He also received the Medal of the Royal Geographical Society in 1967. Later in life, he continued to write and speak about indigenous rights, writing several books on Indian traditions. He experienced health problems related to malaria and other illnesses contracted during his time in the Amazon rainforest.

He died in São Paulo on 12 December 2002, aged 88, from multiple organ failure. He was survived by his wife, Marina, and their two sons.
