= Cinema, Aspirins and Vultures =

2005 film directed by Marcelo Gomes

- Directed by: Marcelo Gomes
- Written by: Karim Aïnouz; Paulo Caldas; Marcelo Gomes; Ranulpho Gomes
- Produced by: Karim Aïnouz
- Starring: João Miguel; Peter Ketnath
- Cinematography: Mauro Pinheiro Jr.
- Edited by: Karen Harley
- Music by: Tomás Alves de Souza
- Production company: Rec Produtores Associados
- Distributed by: Imovision
- Release dates: 17 May 2005 (Cannes); 11 November 2005 (Brazil)
- Running time: 99 minutes
- Country: Brazil
- Language: Portuguese
- Budget: R$2.1 million
- Box office: R$882,373

Cinema, Aspirins and Vultures (Portuguese: Cinema, Aspirinas e Urubus) is a 2005 Brazilian film directed and co-written by Marcelo Gomes. It was Brazil's submission to the 79th Academy Awards for the Academy Award for Best Foreign Language Film, but was not accepted as a nominee. It was also screened in the Un Certain Regard section at the 2005 Cannes Film Festival.

In 2015, the Brazilian Film Critics Association aka Abraccine voted Cinema, Aspirins and Vultures the 75th greatest Brazilian film of all time, in its list of the 100 best Brazilian films.

== Plot synopsis ==
German national Johann is traveling in rural northern Brazil in the 1940s, selling the new drug aspirin by screening a short promotional film for isolated villagers, many of whom have never seen a motion picture. He meets drifter Ranulpho, who agrees to work for Johann in exchange for a ride to Rio de Janeiro. They have many encounters and misadventures on their journey, eventually selling out Johann's entire stock of aspirin to a wealthy brothel owner.

When Brazil formally declares war on Germany in August, 1942, Johann is ordered to either return to his homeland or turn himself into a Brazilian concentration camp until the end of hostilities. Not wishing to participate in the European war, Johann paints over the advertising logos on the company truck, splits the sales money with Ranulpho, and smuggles himself onto a train with other workers who are supporting the Brazilian-American alliance by working on rubber plantations in the Amazonian jungle.

== Cast ==
- João Miguel - Ranulpho
- Peter Ketnath - Johann
- Madalena Accioly as Mulher da Cobra
- Jeane Alves as Mulher Amamentando
- Daniela Câmara as Neide
- Veronica Cavalcanti as Maria da Paz
- Jorge Clésio as Funcionário dos Correios
- Lúcia do Acordeon as Sanfoneira
- Mano Fialho as Caçador
- Francisco Figueiredo as Rapaz na Estrada
- Paula Francinete as Lindalva
- Hermila Guedes as Jovelina
- Sandro Guerra as Homem da Cobra
- José Leite as Dono do Restaurante
- Nanego Lira as Funcionário da Estação de Trem
- Arilson Lopes as Dono do Posto de Gasolina
- Zezita Matos as Mulher da Galinha
- Osvaldo Mil as Claudionor Assis
- Fabiana Pirro as Adelina
- Rodrigo Riszla as Stand in
- Irandhir Santos as Manoel

== Reception ==
Robledo Milani, writing for Papo de Cinema (pt), praised both Miguel and Ketnath in their portrayals, saying that both conveyed natural realism. Milani also felt that Mauro Pinheiro's cinematography captured the "rawness" of the scenes well, and that Tomás Alves de Souza's music provided an ideal tone. Milani admitted that the film would not appeal to all audiences and that it lacks "unexpected twists", but gave the movie a score of eight out of ten stars. While Flávio Augusto, writing for CinePlayers, found that the plot for the film was overall "lacking", the cinematography was captivating and portrayed the residents of the Brazilian countryside far better than the comedic antics to which they are often reduced. Augusto pointed out that it might not be the best film produced in Brazil in 2005, but it stands out amongst its competition. Pablo Villaça, writing for CinemaEmCena, found the script to be a compelling depiction of misery, culture clash, and Brazil's "seeming endless capacity for resistance." Villaça noted that the use of locals as extras would make it easy for non-Brazilian viewers to be swept up in "seduction" to exoticism where Brazilians would see the suffering of their fellows. Villaça was also impressed by the way that the film conveys the prejudice within society without heavy-handed commentary. Waldemar Dalenogare Neto stated that the developing relationship between Johann and Ranulpho satisfied, but that the subtitles for the parts where Ketnath speaks German did not "maintain the grandeur" of the performance.

Cinema, Aspirins and Vultures has an approval rating of 86% on review aggregator website Rotten Tomatoes, based on 7 reviews, and an average rating of 6.8/10.

Ray Bennett, writing for The Hollywood Reporter, said the film provided audiences a look at the "parched wilderness" of Brazil and found the presentation of the relationship between Ranulpho and Johann pleasing. Bennett praised Gomes' direction but also noted that the film would be unlikely to leave the festival circuit. Manohla Dargis, writing for The New York Times, stated that there is a suspense inherent in the film as viewers wait for Johann and Ranulpho to turn on one another. Dargis also stated that the pair never really develop a friendship, and that the film lacks grand overtures and drama in the traditional vein. Dargis praised the film for being about "unremarkable individuals who survive extraordinary times rather than triumph over them." Kate Spatola, writing for PopMatters after the DVD release, said the film possesses a quiet strength in its portrayal of ordinary moments filled with "charged possibility". Spatola also commented on how the tension of World War II permeates the film but doesn't subsume the story of Ranulpho and Johann.

== See also ==
- List of submissions to the 79th Academy Awards for Best Foreign Language Film
- List of Brazilian submissions for the Academy Award for Best Foreign Language Film
