= Marcelo Gomes (director) =

Brazilian film director

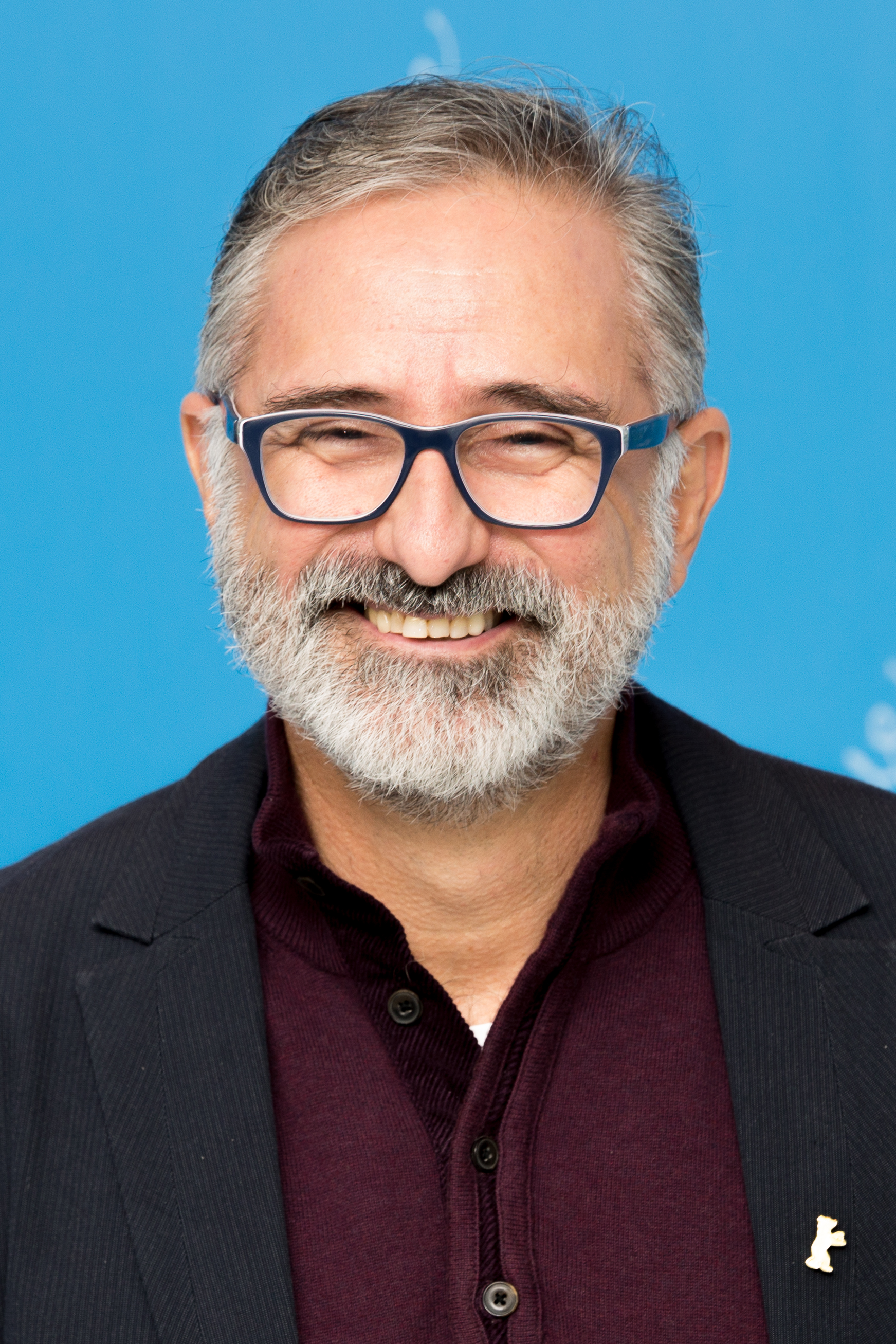
- Gomes in 2017
- Born: Recife, Pernambuco, Brazil
- Occupations: Film director, screenwriter
- Years active: 1995-present

Marcelo Gomes is a Brazilian film director, screenwriter and visual artist. Most known for his films Cinema, Aspirins and Vultures (2005) and Joaquim (2017).

== Early life ==
Gomes was born in Recife, Brazil. Before going on to create films, he worked as a programmer of films at a film club.

== Career ==
Gomes first directed several short films and a TV Movie, between 1995 and 2000.

His debut feature film, Cinema, Aspirins and Vultures, was screened in the Un Certain Regard section at the 2005 Cannes Film Festival. It was selected as the Brazilian submission to the 79th Academy Awards for the Academy Award for Best Foreign Language Film, but was not nominated.

His 2009 I Travel Because I Have to, I Come Back Because I Love You, co-directed with Karim Aïnouz, had its world premiere at the Orizzonti section of the 66th Venice International Film Festival.

His 2013 film The Man of the Crowd was screened in the Panorama section of the 64th Berlin International Film Festival.

His historical drama Joaquim (2017) had its world premiere at the main competition of the 67th Berlin International Film Festival, where it was nominated for the Golden Bear. It won several awards, including Best Film at CinEuphoria in Portugal and at the Havana Film Festival New York.

His 2022 film Paloma, follows a transgender woman in rural Brazil who wishes to have a traditional Catholic wedding. It had its world premiere at the 2022 Munich Film Festival, and was screened at the Adelaide Film Festival in October 2022.

== Filmography ==
=== Feature films ===
Year	English Title	Original Title	Notes
2005	Cinema, Aspirins and Vultures	Cinema, Aspirinas e Urubus	
2009	I Travel Because I Have to, I Come Back Because I Love You	Viajo Porque Preciso, Volto Porque te Amo	Co-directed with Karim Aïnouz
2012	Once Upon a Time Was I, Verônica	Era Uma Vez Eu, Verônica	
2013	The Man of the Crowd	O Homem das Multidões	Co-directed with Cao Guimarães
2017	Joaquim		
2022	Paloma		
2024	Portrait of a Certain Orient	Retrato de um certo Oriente	Arabic and French language debut
2025	Dolores		Co-directed with Maria Clara Escobar

=== Documentaries ===
Year	English Title	Original Title	Notes
2019	Waiting for the Carnival	Estou Me Guardando Para Quando O Carnaval Chegar	
2025	Creatures of the Mind	Criaturas da Mente	

=== TV Series ===
2025: Oxygen Masks Will Not Drop Automatically (5 episodes)

=== Short Films ===
- O Brasil em Curtas 06 - Curtas Pernambucanos - 1999
- Clandestina Felicidade - 1999
- Os Brasileiros - 2000; TV film

== Recognition and awards ==
In 2005, Cinema, Aspirins and Vultures won the French National Education Prize. Many of his other films have won or been nominated for film awards, including:

- 2009: I Travel Because I Have to, I Come Back Because I Love You, winner, FIPRESCI prize, Havana Film Festival
- 2019: Waiting for the Carnival, selected for the masters program of the International Documentary Film Festival Amsterdam
