= Laura Neiva =

Brazilian actress and model (born 1993)

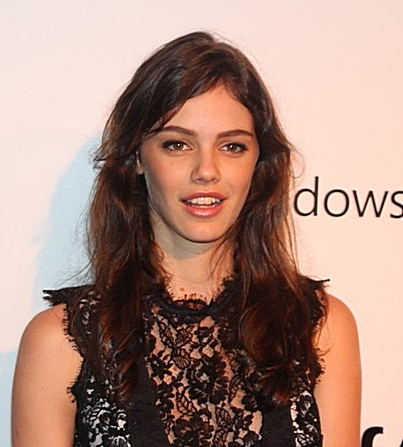
- Born: September 21, 1993 (age 33); São Paulo, Brazil
- Occupations: Actress, model
- Years active: 2009–present
- Height: 1.70 m (5 ft 7 in)
- Spouse: Chay Suede (m. 2019)
- Children: 3

Laura Franca dos Santos Neiva (born September 21, 1993) is a Brazilian actress and model. She appeared in the film Adrift, which competed in the 2009 Cannes Film Festival.

== Career ==
Born in São Paulo, the actress was discovered in Orkut in 2007 by the Adrift's film crew who was looking for a protagonist. The film was directed by Heitor Dhalia and the French actor Vincent Cassel; the Brazilian American actress Camilla Belle and the Brazilian actress Débora Bloch were also part of the cast. Her second film was the blockbuster E Aí... Comeu?, in which she worked with Bruno Mazzeo. She was part of the cast of the short film DES. together with the stylist Alexandre Herchcovitch, who was responsible for Adrift's wardrobe.

Her success attracted the attention of the fashion industry, and she was hired as the spokesperson of the brands Corello and Fillity. In 2012 she was hired by the stylist Karl Lagerfeld to work as Chanel's Brazilian ambassador.

The actress starred in the 2013 remake of Rede Globo's telenovela Saramandaia as Stela Rosado. Laura Neiva played Betina, who is a character who has a romantic relationship with Mariana Lima's character Roberta Camargo, in the 2014 remake of the 1974 telenovela O Rebu.

== Personal life ==
Neiva started dating actor Chay Suede in 2014. They were married on February 2, 2019 and have three children: a daughter, Maria, born in 2019, a son, José, born in 2021 and another daughter, Ana, born in 2024.

== Filmography ==
=== Film ===
Year	Title	Role
2009	Adrift	Filipa
2012	E Aí... Comeu?	Gabriela Alencar
2012	Mundo Invisível	Julieta
2012	DES.	Maria
2013	Serra Pelada	Joaquim's wife
2014	Rio, I Love You	Maria
2014	O Menino no Espelho	Cíntia
2016	Jonas	Branca
2017	TOC: Transtornada Obsessiva Compulsiva	Kika's Dream Girl
2021	Maria Antônia: A Batalha dos Estudantes	Luciana

=== Television ===
Year	Title	Role	Notes
2013	Saramandaia	Stela Rosado	
2014	O Rebu	Betina Rosemberg	
2015	Não se Apega, Não	Isabela Freitas	Fantástico's Segment
2015	Psi	Bianca	Episode: "As Meninas"
2017	Supermax: O Inferno em Suas Mentes	Sunny Days	
2018	Desnude	Eva	Episode: "Eva"

=== Music Videos ===
Year	Song	Role	Artist
2020	"Deve Ser Horrível Dormir Sem Mim"	Producer	Manu Gavassi e Gloria Groove

== Theater ==
Year	Title	Role
2010	Ligações Perigosas	Cécile
2018	Cabaret Tá Na Rua	All role
