= Paula Febbe =

Brazilian writer and screenwriter

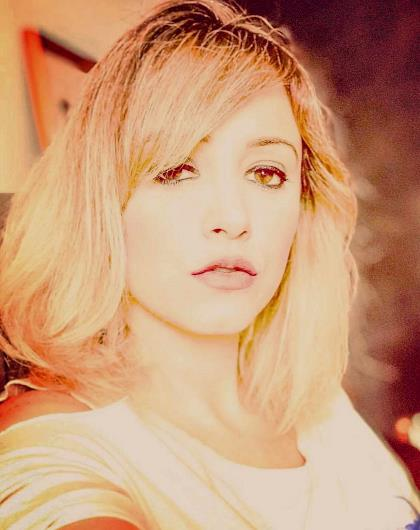
- Born: 27 May 1983 (age 43); São Paulo, Brazil
- Education: Goldcrest Production Theater
- Occupations: Novelist and screenwriter
- Writing career
- Genres: Horror, Fantasy
- Website: Official website

Paula Febbe (27 May 1983) is a Brazilian horror and fantasy writer and screenwriter.

== Biography ==
Paula was born in the city of São Paulo, Brazil, in 1983. She started writing songs during her teenage years. Paula studied script at the Goldcrest Post Production Theater in New York City while working as a nanny and waitress at wakes to pay the bills. In Brazil, she has a Radio and Television Degree, specializing in script and psychoanalysis. She has written for vehicles such as Rolling Stone magazine and Folha de São Paulo. She was also a psychoanalysis columnist for Ana Maria Braga's website. She was press agent for B.B. King's "One More Time" tour in Latin America.

She started publishing stories online by Mojo Books, in 2010. In 2011, she released her first book, Relato Inspirado por Orelhas (Ears), independently, which boosted her in the literary world. In 2013, she launched the book Mãos Secas Com Apenas Duas Folhas (Dry Hands With Only Two Sheets of Paper), by Descaminhos.

In 2014, Paula had one of her short stories, "Limerence", made into a short film by filmmaker Larissa Anzoategui. The author was also invited to write this script. In 2015, she launched the book Metástase, in which she further developed the story started by the aforementioned tale.

In 2019, she launched the book As Vantagens que Encontrei na Morte de Meu Pai (The Advantages I Found in My Father's Death), by Cabana Vermelha. Also in 2019, Paula was invited by director Fernando Sanches to co-write the long film7 Pecadoras, which originated the short film "5 Estrelas" (5 Stars, co-written by Paula. The short film became the winner of the Canal Brasil Acquisition Award at the Ibero-American Film Festival and the Cine Fantasy Festival. He was also part of the Official Selection of LABRFF, in Los Angeles, and of the FANTASPOA Festival, in 2020, the same year that Paula was the screenwriter and researcher of one of the new projects of filmmaker Heitor Dhalia, entitled Fetiche, which were created based in one of Paula's stories.

In 2021, the film 5 Estrelas was a finalist in the Brazilian Cinema Grand Prix in the Fiction Short Film category.

Also in 2021, the author relaunched the book on DarkSide Books Vantagens que encontrei na morte do meu pai (Advantages I found in my father's death).
