= Generation Revolution =

- Directed by: Cassie Quarless; Usayd Younis
- Produced by: Cassie Quarless; Usayd Younis
- Edited by: Nse Asuquo; Richard Guard
- Music by: Wayne Roberts
- Production companies: black & brown Films
- Distributed by: black & brown Films
- Release date: 14 June 2016 (Sheffield)
- Running time: 72 minutes
- Country: United Kingdom
- Language: English

Generation Revolution is a 2016 British documentary film directed by Cassie Quarless and Usayd Younis. It follows the stories of Black and Asian activists in London who aim to change the social and political landscape in the capital. The film preceded the inception of the UK's Black Lives Matter movement.

The film premiered at Sheffield Doc/Fest on 14 June 2016. It released on Netflix UK & Ireland on 1 October 2020.

== Synopsis ==
Starting in 2014 and ending in 2016. Generation Revolution chronicles the rise of two black activist groups, the London Black Revolutionaries and R Movement, and their growing reputation for daring stunts. From ‘die-ins’ to ‘Black Brunches’ they organise civil resistance around issues as diverse as police brutality, gentrification and the migrant crisis.

"The acclaim and notoriety they get is short-lived, however, the leader of the London Black Revolutionaries threatens to bring the group down just as they are getting established and through their misplaced energies R Movement risk losing their most passionate members".

The film ends at a widely reported protest at Heathrow airport. This coordinated day of action saw roads shut down in Birmingham, Nottingham and Heathrow.

== Production ==
Production began in 2014, shooting with the activist group the London Black Revolutionaries. Whilst filming at the 'We Can't Breathe' protest at the Westfield shopping centre in West London, one of the directors was arrested along with 72 other protestors. The directors were also chased by police during the making of the film, with the pursuit leading to one of the production's lenses being smashed.

The two directors stated that they were inspired to make the film as a way of counteracting the often negative portrayal that young people of colour were getting in the media and amongst the general public.

== Release ==
The film world premiered at Sheffield Doc/Fest in 2016 and had its London premiere at the East End Film Festival. It went on to tour the UK with Picturehouse Cinemas and was taken around the United States, Brazil and Argentina in 2017. Notable screenings include The Brooklyn Academy of Music, Tate Modern and Arnolfini as well as universities such as Berkely, Missouri School of Journalism and Georgetown.

The film received generally favourable reviews in the press with Charlie Phillips of The Guardian describing the film as "important contemporary document" while Peter Bradshaw, also of The Guardian, gave the film 3 out of 5 stars calling the work engaging.
