= Jesuíta Barbosa =

Brazilian actor (born 1991)

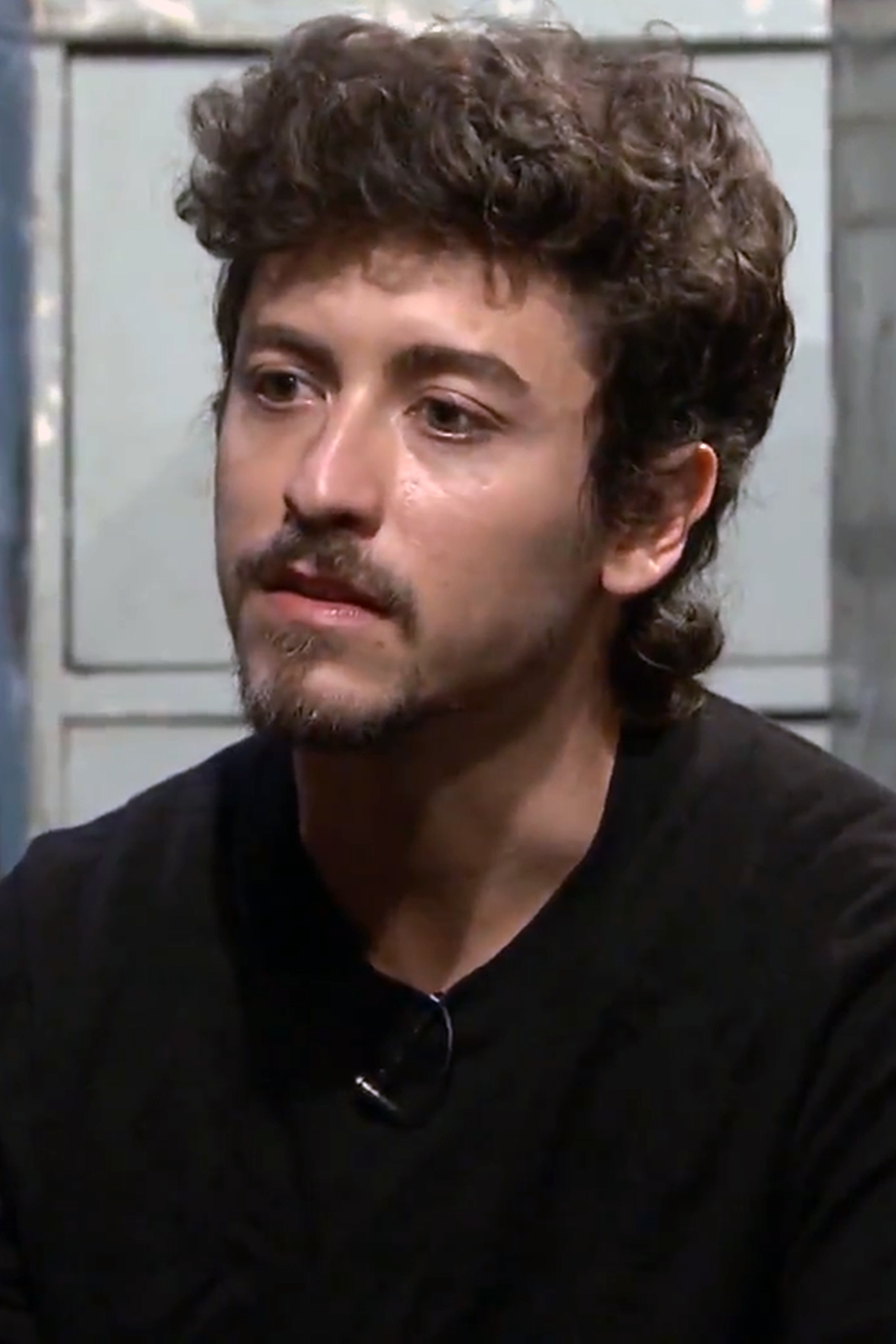
- Barbosa in 2017
- Born: José Jesuíta Barbosa Neto; 26 June 1991 (age 35); Salgueiro, Pernambuco, Brazil
- Education: Federal Institute of Ceará
- Occupation: Actor
- Years active: 2008–present

José Jesuíta Barbosa Neto (Portuguese: [ʒezuˈitɐ baʁˈbɔzɐ]; born 26 June 1991) is a Brazilian actor. He is regarded as one of the leading talents of recent Brazilian cinema, having starred in a number of critically acclaimed films.

== Biography ==
Jesuíta was born in Salgueiro and spent his childhood in Parnamirim, both cities of the hinterlands of Pernambuco. At the age of ten he moved to Fortaleza, Ceará, where he began acting in theater groups at the school. Although his father, a Civil Police delegate, wanted him to enter Law or Medicine, he enrolled in the Basic Principles course of the José de Alencar Theater, and later in the Degree course in Theater of the Federal Institute of Ceará.

== Career ==
Barbosa began his career in the theater, participating in pieces with Center of Experiments in Movements. He made his film debut in the short film O Melhor Amigo.

He has been successful in the respected Cinema of Pernambuco, acting in movies of filmmakers such as Serra Pelada by Heitor Dhalia. His first prize was the Redentor Trophy for Best Actor at the 2013 Rio Film Festival for the movie Tatuagem by Hilton Lacerda.

In television he gained prominence in the telenovela O Rebu and in the series Ligações Perigosas and Justiça.

== Personal life ==
In 2017, Barbosa came out as bisexual, having relationships with men and women. In an interview with Veja magazine, also in 2017, Jesuíta declared: "We can talk about sexuality, but not about relationships. The intimacy of each one does not need to be exposed. That's very beautiful, but talking about my family or who I'm with, no. I'm free and I stay with whoever I want, whether men or women. I prefer not to block myself." The actor dated fellow actor and photographer Fábio Audi from 2014 to 2021.

== Filmography ==
=== Television ===
Year	Title	Role	Notes
2014	Amores Roubados	Fortunato Dias	
2014	Serra Pelada	Navalhada	
2014	O Rebu	Alain	
2015	Sete Vidas	João Miguel Oliveira Sanches (young)	Episode: "March 18"
2016	Ligações Perigosas	Felipe Danceny	
2016	Justiça	Vicente Menezes	
2016	Nada Será Como Antes	Davi	Special guest (Ep. 9–12)
2016	Fim do Mundo	Cristiano	
2018	Onde Nascem os Fortes	Ramirinho Curió Jr. / Shakira do Sertão	
2019	Feras	Guile	Episode: "Done, Now You're Fluid"
2019	Verão 90	Jerônimo Guerreiro (Rojê)	
2022	Pantanal	Joventino Leôncio Neto (Jove)	
2026	Quem Ama Cuida	Carlos	

=== Film ===
Year	Title	Role	Notes
2013	O Melhor Amigo	Lucas	Short film
2013	Cine Holliúdy	Acrísio	
2013	Serra Pelada	Navalhada	
2013	Tatuagem	Soldado Araújo "Fininha"	
2015	A História de uma Pena	Wagner	Short film
2014	Futuro Beach	Ayrton	
2014	Trash	Turk	
2016	Reza a Lenda	Pica-Pau	
2016	Jonas	Jonas	
2017	O Grande Circo Místico	Celavi	
2017	Malasartes e o Duelo com a Morte	Pedro Malasartes	
2018	O Grande Circo Místico	Celaví	
2018	Unremember	Eduardo / Thiago	
2021	O Auto da Boa Mentira	Chefia	
2021	Greice		
2022	A Filha do Palhaço	Marlon	
2023	Água Doce	João	Short film
2025	Homem com H	Ney Matogrosso	

== Theater ==
Year	Title	Role	Ref
2008	Cabaré da Dama (as Monnique Frazão)		
2009	Corpos Aprisionados (with Centro de Experimentações em Movimentos)		
2009	Deserdados (with Centro de Experimentações em Movimentos)		
2010	O Mistério da Cascata		
2010	O Pagador de Promessas		
	Rimprovisando (Cia. Teatro do Improviso)		
2011	A Cigarra e a Formiga		
2011	Borboleta Acorrentada		
2012	Uma Flor de Dama		
2012	O Fabuloso Catador de Histórias		
2019	Lazarus	Thomas Jerome Newton	

== Awards and Directions ==
Year	Award	Category	Work	Results	Ref.
2013	Festival de Cinema do Rio	Best actor	Tatuagem	Won	
2014	Grande Prêmio do Cinema Brasileiro	Best actor	Tatuagem	Nominated	
2014	Festival de Cinema de Língua Portuguesa	Best actor	Tatuagem	Won	
2014	Melhores do Ano	Best Revelation Actor	O Rebu	Nominated	
2014	Prêmio Quem de Televisão	Best Revelation	O Rebu	Nominated	
2014	Prêmio Extra de Televisão	Best Revelation	Amores Roubados	Nominated	
2014	Troféu APCA	Best actor	Amores Roubados	Nominated	
2014	Prêmio F5	Revelation of the Year	Amores Roubados e O Rebu	Nominated	
2014	Grande Prêmio do Cinema Brasileiro	Best supporting actor	Serra Pelada	Nominated	
2015	Grande Prêmio do Cinema Brasileiro	Best supporting actor	Praia do Futuro	Won	
2016	Prêmio Extra de Televisão	Best Actor	Justiça	Nominated	
2016	Melhores do Ano	Best Series Actor, and Miniseries	Justiça	Won	
2016	Prêmio Quem de Televisão	Best supporting actor	Justiça	Nominated	
