= Chasing Robert Barker =

2015 British-Icelandic thriller film

- Directed by: Daniel Florêncio
- Written by: Daniel Florêncio; Maria Nefeli Zygopoulou
- Produced by: Daniel Florêncio; Snorri Þórisson
- Starring: Gudmundur Thorvaldsson; Patrick Baladi; Celyn Jones; Hilda Péter; Elizabeth Boag
- Cinematography: Azul Serra
- Edited by: Daniel Florêncio
- Music by: Patrick Moore
- Production companies: I Made it Films; Pegasus Pictures
- Release date: 2015
- Running time: 90 minutes
- Countries: United Kingdom; Iceland
- Language: English

Chasing Robert Barker is a 2015 British-Icelandic thriller film directed by Daniel Florêncio and written by Florêncio and Maria Nefeli Zygopoulou. The film stars Gudmundur Thorvaldsson, Patrick Baladi, Celyn Jones, Hilda Péter and Elizabeth Boag. Set against the backdrop of Britain's tabloid culture and the phone-hacking scandal, the film follows a London paparazzo who becomes entangled in a fabricated celebrity story.

== Premise ==
A photographer turned paparazzo is caught in the downward spiral of a fabricated story while navigating a media environment shaped by celebrity obsession, surveillance and unethical journalistic practices.

== Development ==
The screenplay was inspired by Florêncio's documentary Tracking William: A Night with a Paparazzo, produced for Current TV in the United Kingdom. The documentary followed a paparazzo attempting to photograph Prince William and Catherine Middleton and led Florêncio to explore the culture of celebrity journalism and tabloid reporting in a fictional feature film.

== Production ==
In 2013, Florêncio and producer Maria Nefeli Zygopoulou launched a Kickstarter crowdfunding campaign to finance the film. The campaign attracted international attention and was selected as Indiewire's Project of the Month.

The film was produced as a British-Icelandic co-production between I Made it Films and Pegasus Pictures, with producer Snorri Þórisson representing the Icelandic side of the production.

== Cast ==
- Gudmundur Thorvaldsson as David
- Patrick Baladi
- Celyn Jones
- Hilda Péter
- Elizabeth Boag
- Eugenia Caruso
- Christopher Villiers

== Release ==
Chasing Robert Barker had its world premiere at the Reykjavík International Film Festival in September 2015.

The film received its UK premiere at the East End Film Festival in June 2016.

== Reception ==
The film won Best Film at the 2016 National Film Awards UK and received nominations for Best Actor and Best Supporting Actor.

The screenplay was also nominated for the Accession Award at the East End Film Festival, a competition recognising emerging screenwriters.

== Accolades ==
Year	Award	Category	Result
2016	National Film Awards UK	Best Film	Won
2016	National Film Awards UK	Best Actor	Nominated
2016	National Film Awards UK	Best Supporting Actor	Nominated
2016	East End Film Festival	Accession Award	Nominated
