= Lino Facioli =

British–Brazilian actor

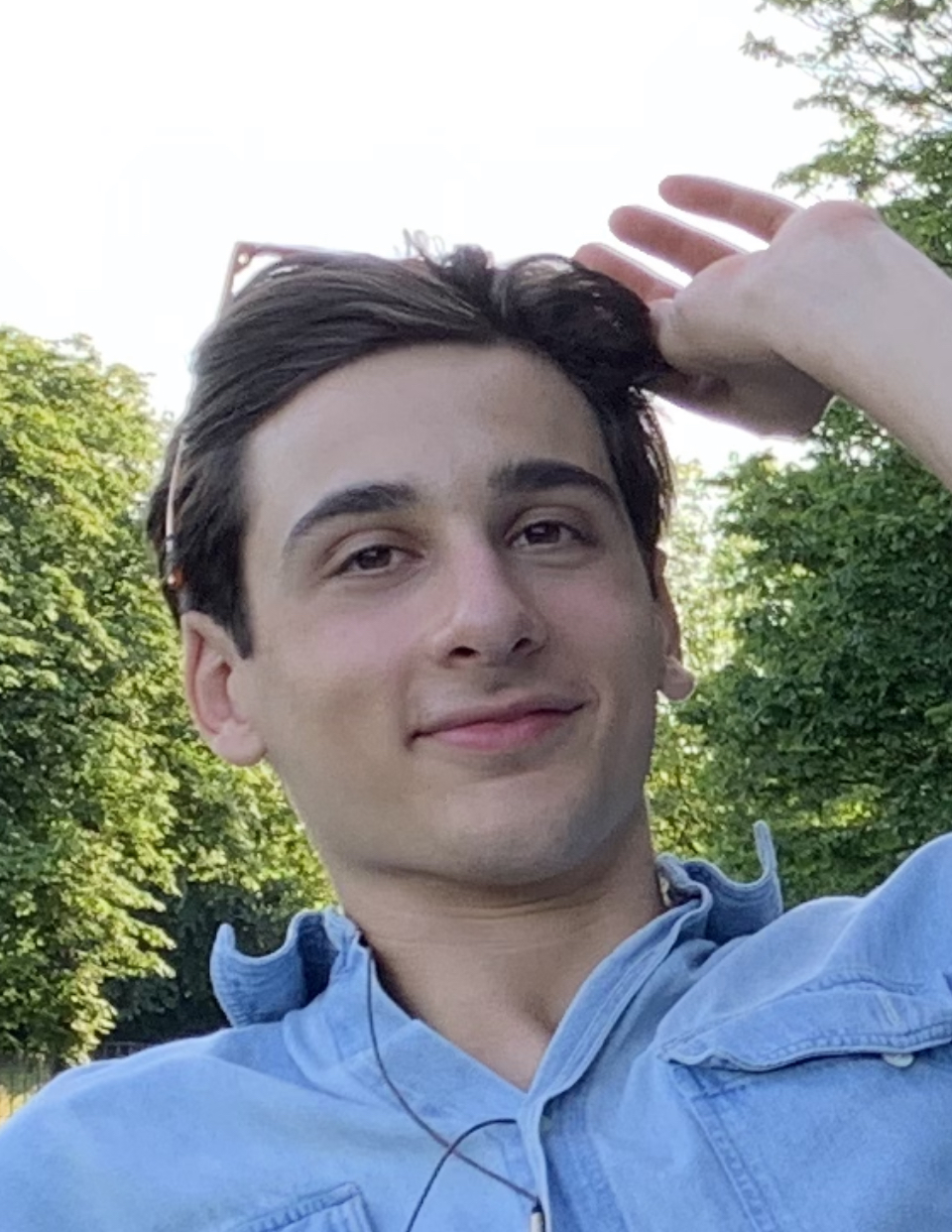
- Lino Facioli in 2021
- Born: Lino Schmidek Machado Facioli; 29 July 2000 (age 25); Ribeirão Preto, São Paulo, Brazil
- Citizenship: Brazil; United Kingdom
- Occupation: Actor
- Years active: 2010–present

Lino Schmidek Machado Facioli (born 29 July 2000) is a Brazilian-British actor. He is best known for portraying Robin Arryn in Game of Thrones and Naples in Get Him to the Greek.

== Biography ==
Facioli was born in Ribeirão Preto, São Paulo state. He is of Austrian, Portuguese, Italian and German descent. Lino's maternal grandfather, Werner Robert Schmidek, was born in Vienna, Austria, and emigrated to Brazil in 1960. He moved to the United Kingdom with his family when he was 4 years old.

== Career ==
He showed an interest in an acting career at age 7 when he was enrolled in a theatre school in London. In 2010, he began his career with appearances in short metages and television series. His first professional work was in the British short film Awfully Deep in 2010 from director Daniel Florêncio. In the same year, he joined the cast of Get Him to the Greek, acting as the son of actor Russell Brand. He played the troublesome Robin Arryn, Lord of a noble family in the series Game of Thrones.

In 2014, he starred in the Brazilian film O Menino no Espelho, working alongside the Brazilian actors Mateus Solano, Regiane Alves and Laura Neiva.

In 2019 he played a minor role in the British teen comedy Netflix series Sex Education.

== Filmography ==
=== Film ===
Year	Title	Role	Notes
2010	Get Him to the Greek	Naples	
2010	Awfully Deep	Lino	Short films
2011	The Boy with Chocolate Fingers	Doctor	Short films
2011	The Last Ten	Little Boy Witness	Short films
2012	Broken	Stephen	
2014	The Boy in the Mirror	Fernando / Odnanref	
2018	Isha	Cemil	Short films
2020	Boys of Film 20: Heaven Can Wait	Unknown	Short films

=== Television ===
Year	Title	Role	Notes
2010	The Armstrong and Miller Show	Marcus / Michael	1 episode
2011–19	Game of Thrones	Robin Arryn	9 episodes
2020–21	Sex Education	Dex Thompson	6 episodes
2024	Masters of the Air	Lt. Adams	1 episode
