= Chay Suede =

Brazilian singer and actor

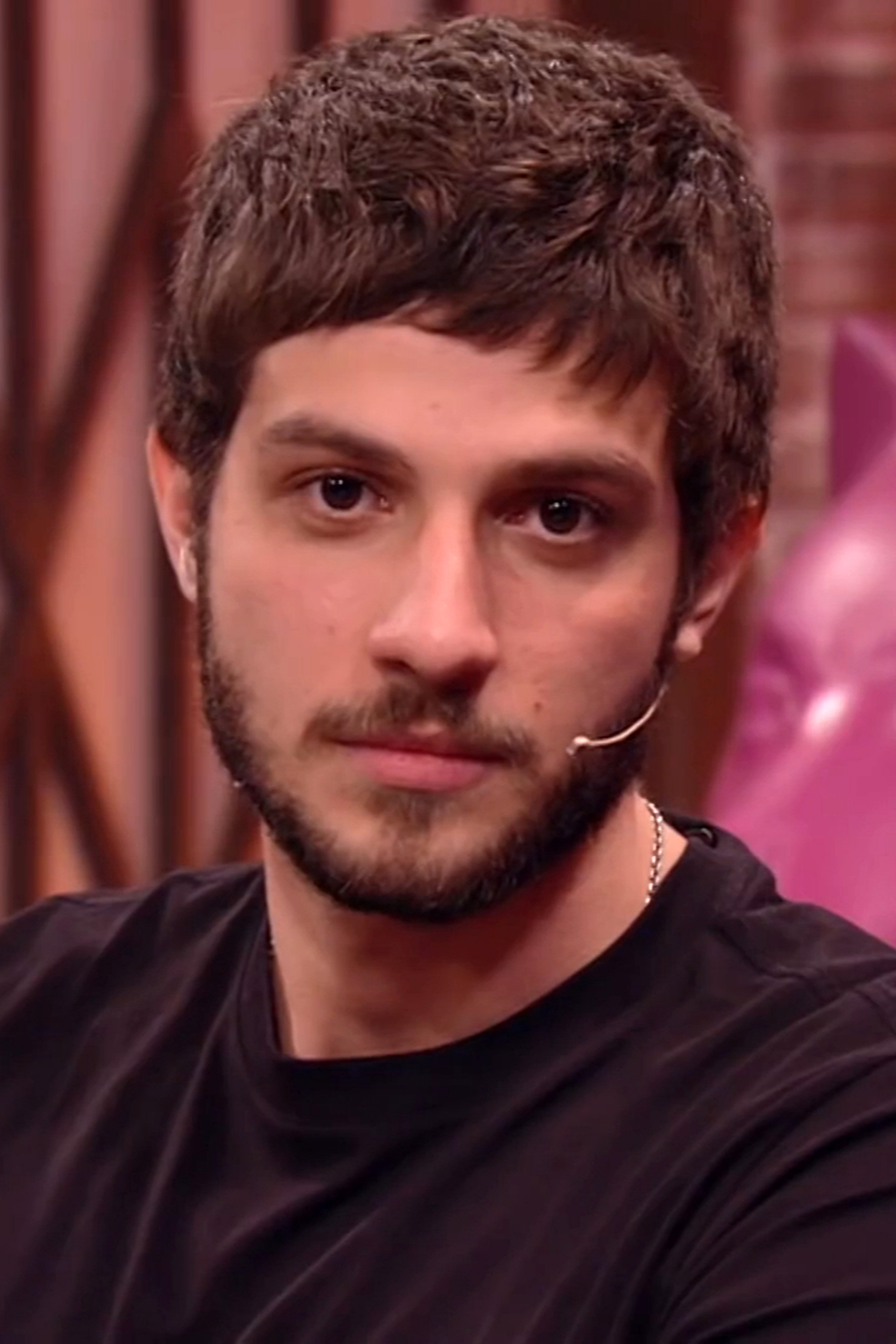
- Suede on the Lady Night program in 2019
- Born: 30 June 1992 (age 34); Vila Velha, Espírito Santo, Brazil
- Occupations: Actor; singer; songwriter
- Years active: 2010–present
- Spouse: Laura Neiva (m. 2019)
- Children: 3
- Musical career
- Genres: Folk; pop; MPB
- Instrument: Vocals
- Labels: EMI; Universal
- Formerly of: Rebeldes

Roobertchay Domingues da Rocha Filho (Portuguese: [ˈʃaj suˈɛdʒi]; born 30 June 1992), known professionally as Chay Suede, is a Brazilian actor and singer-songwriter.

== Career ==
Chay Suede made his first television appearance in the fifth season of the RecordTV talent show Ídolos (2010), where he finished in fourth place. His popularity with younger audiences led to his casting as one of the protagonists in the Brazilian adaptation of the telenovela Rebelde (2011). Following the disbandment of the musical group formed by the cast, Suede released his self-titled debut album in 2013. He later signed with Rede Globo and portrayed the young José Alfredo in the early phase of the telenovela Império (2014). In 2015, he appeared as Rafael in Babilônia.

In 2016, he portrayed Pedro Guedes Leitão in the telenovela A Lei do Amor, in its first phase.

== Filmography ==
=== Television ===
Year	Title	Role	Notes
2010	Ídolos	Participant	Fifth season, 4th place
2011–12	Rebelde	Tomás Campos Sales Penedo	
2012	Rebeldes para Sempre	Himself	End of year special
2013	Hora do Chay	Presenter	
2014	Milagres de Jesus	Gerson	Episode: "A Cura da Mão Ressequida"
2014	Império	Young José Alfredo Medeiros	Episodes dated: "21–24 July"
2015	Babilônia	Rafael Marcondes	
2016	A Lei do Amor	Young Pedro Guedes Leitão	Episodes: "October 3–7"
2017	Novo Mundo	Joaquim Martinho / Tinga	
2018	Segundo Sol	Ícaro Batista	
2018	Valentins	RockMor	Episode: "Uma Nova Ameaça"
2019–2021	Amor de Mãe	Danilo Lopes Viana / Domênico dos Santos Silva	
2022–23	Travessia	Ariovaldo "Ari" Fernandes de Souza	
2024–25	Mania de Você	Mavi	
2026	Quem Ama Cuida	Pedro Santana	

=== Film ===
Year	Title	Role
2013	No Capricho: O Filme	Himself
2014	Lascados	Felipe
2015	JONAS	Fê
2016	A Frente Fria que a Chuva Traz	Espeto
2018	O Banquete	Ted
2018	Rasga Coração	Luca
2019	Minha Fama de Mau	Erasmo Carlos
2019	Domingo	Mauro
2019	O Sofá	Pharaó
2020	Amarillas	Singer
2022	A Jaula	Djalma
2024	Dona Lurdes - O Filme	Danilo Lopes Nunes / Domênico dos Santos Silva

=== Music Videos ===
Year	Song	Role	Artist
2013	"Clichê Adolescente"	Himself	Manu Gavassi
2020	"Deve Ser Horrível Dormir Sem Mim"	Himself	Manu Gavassi e Gloria Groove

== Discography ==
=== Studio albums ===
Album	Details
Chay Suede	Release: 18 October 2013; Formats: CD, digital download, streaming; Label: Universal Music

=== With Aymoréco ===
==== Studio albums ====
Albums list
Album	Details
Aymoréco	Release: 26 August 2016; Formats: CD, digital download, streaming; Label: Universal Music

==== Extended plays (EPs) ====
Albums list
Album	Details
Aymoréco	Launch: 18 December 2015; Formats: Download digital, streaming; Label: Universal Music

=== Singles ===
As main artist

List of singles, with selected chart positions
Title	Year	Best positions	Album
Title	Year	BRA	Album
"Papel"	2013	—	Chay Suede
"Chuva de Like" (with Aymoréco)	2016	—	Aymoréco
"—" denotes singles that did not chart or were not released in the country.

==== As a guest artist ====
List of singles, with selected chart positions
Title	Year	Best positions	Album
Title	Year	BRA	Album
"Segredo" (Manu Gavassi feat. Chay Suede)	2013	—	Clichê Adolescente
"Pararura" (Rayne feat. Chay Suede)	2014	—	Not added to any album
"—" denotes singles that did not chart or were not released in the country.

=== Other appearances ===
Title	Year	Other(s) artist(s)	Album
"Fantástico"	2016	Luiza Possi, Orchestra	Especial Globo 50 Anos
"Minha Fama de Mau"	2019	—	Minha Fama de Mau
"Festa de Arromba"	2019	—	Minha Fama de Mau
"Eu Sou Terrível"	2019	—	Minha Fama de Mau
"Lobo Mau"	2019	—	Minha Fama de Mau
"Sentado À Beira Do Caminho"	2019	—	Minha Fama de Mau
"Vem Quente Que Eu Estou Fervendo"	2019	—	Minha Fama de Mau
"Gatinha Manhosa"	2019	—	Minha Fama de Mau
"Devolva-me"	2019	Malu Rodrigues	Minha Fama de Mau

== Awards and nominations ==
Year	Awards	Category	Nominated work	Result	Ref
2011	Prêmio Extra de Televisão	Revelação Masculina	Rebelde	Won	
2011	Meus Prêmios Nick 2011	Gato do Ano	Rebelde	Nominated	
2011	Capricho Awards	Colírio Nacional	Rebelde	Won	
2011	Capricho Awards	Melhor Ator Nacional	Rebelde	Nominated	
2012	Troféu Imprensa de 2012	Best Actor	Rebelde	Nominated	
2012	Troféu Internet de 2012	Best Actor	Rebelde	Won	
2012	Meus Prêmios Nick 2012	Gato do Ano	Rebelde	Nominated	
2012	Prêmio Arte Qualidade Brasil	Revelação Masculina	Rebelde	Won	
2012	Prêmio Jovem Brasileiro	Melhor Cantor Jovem	Himself	Won	
2012	Capricho Awards	Cantor Nacional	Himself	Won	
2013	Meus Prêmios Nick 2013	Gato do Ano	Himself	Nominated	
2013	Meus Prêmios Nick 2013	Favourite Presenter	Himself	Won	
2013	Capricho Awards	Cantor Nacional	Himself	Nominated	
2013	Troféu Internet de 2013	Melhor Programa de Entrevistas	Hora do Chay	Nominated	
2014	Meus Prêmios Nick 2014	Gato do Ano	Ele mesmo	Won	
2014	Prêmio F5 2014	Gato do Ano	Ele mesmo	Nominated	
2014	Prêmio Extra de Televisão de 2014	Best Actor	Império	Nominated	
2014	Melhores do Ano de 2014	Melhor Ator Revelação	Império	Won	
2014	Prêmio Quem de Televisão	Melhor Revelação	Império	Nominated	
2015	Troféu Internet de 2015	Best Actor	Império	Nominated	
2015	Troféu Internet de 2015	Melhor Cantor	Himself	Nominated	
