= Saramandaia (2013 TV series) =

- Genre: Telenovela; Drama; Comedy; Romance; Thriller
- Created by: Ricardo Linhares
- Based on: Saramandaia by Dias Gomes
- Developed by: Ricardo Linhares
- Directed by: Denise Saraceni; Fabrício Mamberti
- Starring: Lília Cabral; Jose Mayer; Débora Bloch; Gabriel Braga Nunes; Sérgio Guizé; Leandra Leal; Matheus Nachtergaele; Fernanda Montenegro; Tarcísio Meira; Marcos Palmeira; Vera Holtz; Aracy Balabanian; Renata Sorrah; Ana Beatriz Nogueira; Marcos Pasquim
- Opening theme: "Saramandaia" (Instrumental) by Sérgio Saraceni, Rodrigo Shá, Zé Canuto & Tim Malik
- Country of origin: Brazil
- Original language: Portuguese
- No. of episodes: 56

Production
- Editors: Ubiraci de Motta; Ghynn Paul; Flavio Zettel; George Hamilton
- Camera setup: Multi-camera
- Running time: 45 minutes 20 minutes (Wednesdays)

Original release
- Network: Globo
- Release: 24 June – 27 September 2013

Related
- Gabriela (2012); O Rebu (2014); Saramandaia

Saramandaia is a Brazilian telenovela produced and broadcast by TV Globo. It premiered on 24 June 2013 and ended on 27 September 2013. It's the third "novela das onze" to be aired on the timeslot.

It is based on a telenovela of the same name created by Dias Gomes. Written by Ricardo Linhares in collaboration with Nelson Nadotti, Ana Maria Moretzsohn and João Brandão.

Starring Lilia Cabral, José Mayer, Débora Bloch, Gabriel Braga Nunes, Sérgio Guizé, Leandra Leal, Matheus Nachtergaele, and Fernanda Montenegro.

== Plot ==
The story is set in the fictional municipality of Bole-Bole, which is going through a plebiscite to change its name. The movement is headed by two factions: the traditionalists, or bole-bolenses, led by former mayor Zico Rosado, his godson Carlito Prata and Professor Aristóbulo, who use historical arguments to keep the town's name; and on the other side, the mudancistas, or saramandistas, led by the town's young people, including Zélia Vilar and councillor João Gibão, who started with the idea when he dreamt that the town would have to change its name to Saramandaia, ushering in a new era.

As well as the dispute over the town's name, other plots are unfolding, such as the war between the Vilar and Rosado families. The first has Tibério Vilar as its patriarch, a serious man who was a brave colonel in the past and is now literally stuck to the roots that have grown in his feet from sitting so much. What nobody knows is that Tibério had an affair in his youth with the mysterious Candinha Rosado, matriarch of the rival family, who was also once a strong woman who stood up for the Rosados, even though she is now almost lapsed. Zico is also hiding a secret: he had an intense relationship in the past with Vitoria Vila, the daughter of his archenemy, but, thinking that the relationship couldn't work, Vitoria abandoned Zico to start life again elsewhere. Zico ended up marrying Helena, with whom he had children Zé Mário, now deceased, and Laura, whom he rejected. Vitória, on the other hand, moved to São Paulo, where she married and had children Tiago, Pedro and Zélia, the latter two of whom preferred to live with their grandfather in Bole-Bole, where they became staunch movers and shakers.

A turning point comes when, after thirty years, Vitória returns to Bole-Bole with Tiago. It turns out that a lot has changed: after being abandoned by Vitória, Zico harbors an incessant hatred for the Vilar family, and blames Tibério for the death of his first son Zé Mário. Something peculiar about Zico is that whenever he gets nervous, he puts ants up his nose, but he doesn't seem to mind. He also hates Vitória's children, mainly because they are leading the movement to change the town's name. But what Vitória has never told anyone is that her first daughter Zélia is actually the fruit of her relationship with Zico, generating many conflicts in the plot ever since.

Everything gets even more complicated when Tiago, Vitória's youngest son, starts having an affair with Stela, the granddaughter of Zico Rosado, daughter of the late Zé Mário. The latter died when Stela was still a baby, and she also believes that her mother died in childbirth. But everything changes with the arrival of Risoleta, a provocative woman who returns to Bole-Bole after years to settle accounts with Zico Rosado. It turns out that Risoleta is Stela's real mother, and has come to reconnect with her, having regretted accepting the money offered by Zico to get away from her daughter many years ago. Risoleta is the owner of a boarding house which is very popular with the men of Bole-Bole, and for this reason she is constantly being persecuted by the town's moralistic butts: the nagging Maria Aparadeira, and her friends Fifi and the ravenous Dona Redonda, a huge woman who is about to explode from eating so much. What Risoleta didn't expect was that, alongside all this, she would fall in love with the mysterious Professor Aristóbulo, a dark and very traditional man who says he hasn't slept in over ten years. What he hides from everyone is the fact that he turns into a werewolf every Thursday night.

João Gibão is one of the leaders of the Mudancistas, a shy but very dreamy young man. One of Gibão's most peculiar characteristics is his eccentric hump on his back, which he doesn't reveal to anyone, not even his girlfriend Marcina, the daughter of Maria Aparadeira and Seu Cazuza, who don't approve of their daughter dating the “weirdo”. The truth is that he has a beautiful pair of wings on his back, and his mother, Leocádia, is the only one who knows about it, because not even his brother Lua Viana is very intimate with Gibão. Lua is the mayor of Bole-Bole, but he prefers not to join any “party”, so he remains neutral on the issue of the name change.

=== Plot ending ===
According to the result of the plebiscite, “Saramandaia” wins over “Bole-Bole” by a difference of seven votes, much to the displeasure of the more traditionalist Bole-Bolenses. On top of all this, the town is shaken by Dona Redonda's explosion, which takes place in the middle of the square after she finds out about Gibão's wings. Another emblematic event occurs when Stela and Tiago's relationship is revealed, and the two families reconcile, when Tibério and Candinha finally meet again and become one tree. After everyone definitively discovers Professor Aristóbulo's secret, he becomes the victim of prejudice in the town because he is a werewolf. But after spending the night with Risoleta, he finally manages to sleep and even controls his transformation. After so many disagreements, at Gibão and Marcina's wedding, Zico Rosado shows up to shoot Gibão, but the bullet ends up hitting Marcina. It's at this moment that Gibão finally reveals his wings and saves Marcina, as he flies over the city back in time and stops the shot. Everyone is also impressed when Zélia and Lua's son is born, who comes into the world with a pair of wings similar to Gibão's. After discovering he is Zélia's father, Zico kidnaps the baby to make him the Rosado's newest heir, but Vitória sacrifices herself to Zico to spare her grandson's life. Zico and Vitória are buried to death when the Rosado mansion collapses because of the huge anthill that has formed on the walls of the house. In the last scene, João Gibão flies over the city representing freedom and the beginning of a new era.

== Cast ==
Actor	Character
Sérgio Guizé	João Evangelista Viana (João Gibão)
Chandelly Braz	Marcina Moreira
Leandra Leal	Zélia Vilar
Vera Holtz	Dona Redonda (Evangelina de Souza)
Vera Holtz	Dona Bitela
Lília Cabral	Vitória Vilar
José Mayer	Zico Rosado (Eurico)
Fernando Belo	Luís "Lua" Viana
Débora Bloch	Risoleta
Laura Neiva	Stela Rosado
Gabriel Braga Nunes	Professor Aristóbulo Camargo
Ângela Figueiredo	Helena Santa Rosado (Santinha)
Matheus Nachtergaele	Seu Encolheu
Ana Beatriz Nogueira	Maria Aparecida Moreira (Maria Aparadeira)
Marcos Palmeira	Seu Cazuza Moreira (Zuzu)
Fernanda Montenegro	Candinha (Cândida Rosado)
Tarcísio Meira	Tibério Vilar
Renata Sorrah	Leocádia Viana
Thaís Melchior	Beatriz de Souza (Bia)
André Bankoff	Pedro Vilar
Pedro Tergolina	Tiago Vilar
Aracy Balabanian	Eponina Camargo (Dona Pupu)
Lívia de Bueno	Laura Rosado
Marcos Pasquim	Carlito Prata
Georgiana Góes	Dona Fifi
André Abujamra	
Luiz Henrique Nogueira	Belisário Camargo
Ilva Niño	Cleide Neves
André Frateschi	Dr. Rochinha
Maurício Tizumba	Padre Romeu
Theodoro Cochrane	Delegado Petronílío Amaral
Zéu Britto	Maestro Totó
Val Perré	Firmino
Dja Marthins	Das Dores
Carolina Bezerra	Dora
Camila Lucciola	Rosalice

== Audience ==
=== Ratings ===
Timeslot	# Eps.	Premiere		Finale		Position	TV Season	Average viewership
Timeslot	# Eps.	Date	Primeiro capítulo	Date	Último capítulo	Position	TV Season	Average viewership
Tuesday —Friday; 23:15	56	24 June 2013	27	27 September 2013	18	#1	2013	15
