= Ney Matogrosso =

Brazilian singer (born 1941)

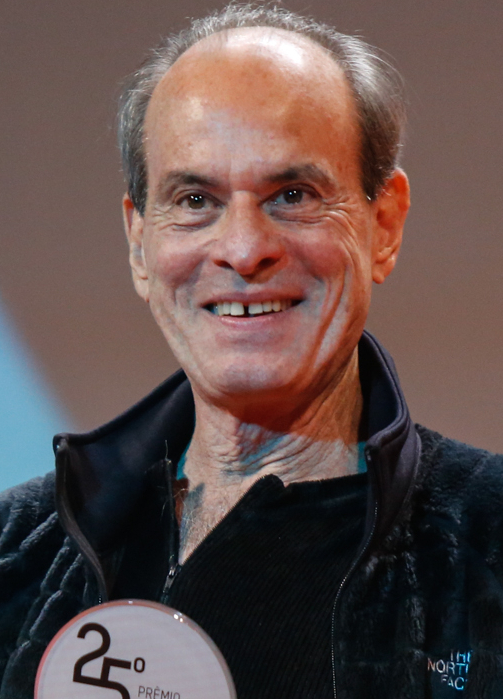
- Matogrosso in 2014

Background information
- Born: Ney de Sousa Pereira; 1 August 1941 (age 85); Bela Vista, Mato Grosso, (Note: Currently part of Mato Grosso do Sul.) Brazil
- Genres: MPB, folk rock, pop rock, glam rock
- Occupations: Singer, music producer
- Years active: 1971–present

Ney de Souza Pereira (born 1 August 1941), known professionally as Ney Matogrosso (Portuguese pronunciation: [ˈnej ˌmatuˈɡɾosu]), is a Brazilian singer with a countertenor voice. He was ranked by Rolling Stone as the third greatest Latin American singer of all time.

== Biography ==
Son of military man Antônio Mattogrosso Pereira (July 13, 1916 - Dec 21, 1985) and Beita de Souza Pereira (b. Oct 5, 1922), Ney had a nomadic childhood, moving from city to city frequently. The stage name he later adopted was taken from his own family, since his father has "Matogrosso" in his name and is a reference to his birth state, Mato Grosso do Sul. Matogrosso enlisted in the Brazilian Air Force at the age of 17, being later transferred to Brasília. Within a few years, Matogrosso started singing in a vocal quartet, performing at college festivals throughout Brazil. With the hope of becoming a stage actor, Ney moved to Rio de Janeiro in 1966, where he lived as a hippie and made ends meet by selling arts and crafts. In 1971, he moved to São Paulo, adopting the artistic name Ney Matogrosso, and joined the glam rock group Secos & Molhados, which in less than 18 months became a phenomenon, selling 1 million records. Endowed with a unique counter-tenor voice and a striking stage presence, Ney's career soared. Matogrosso was the singer and interpreter in the group Secos & Molhados. One of the most interesting moments in their music was "the video-clip Flores Astrais (1974), where Matogrosso plays the role of a hypersensual character on a space-like stage. Matogrosso turned his male physiognomy and his androgynous performance into a landmark of counterculture during the most intensively repressive years of military."

After the group Secos e Molhados split up, Ney pursued a successful solo career in Brazil and abroad, obtaining several Gold and Platinum records.

Ney is known for his costumes, make-up, movements and singular high-pitched voice.

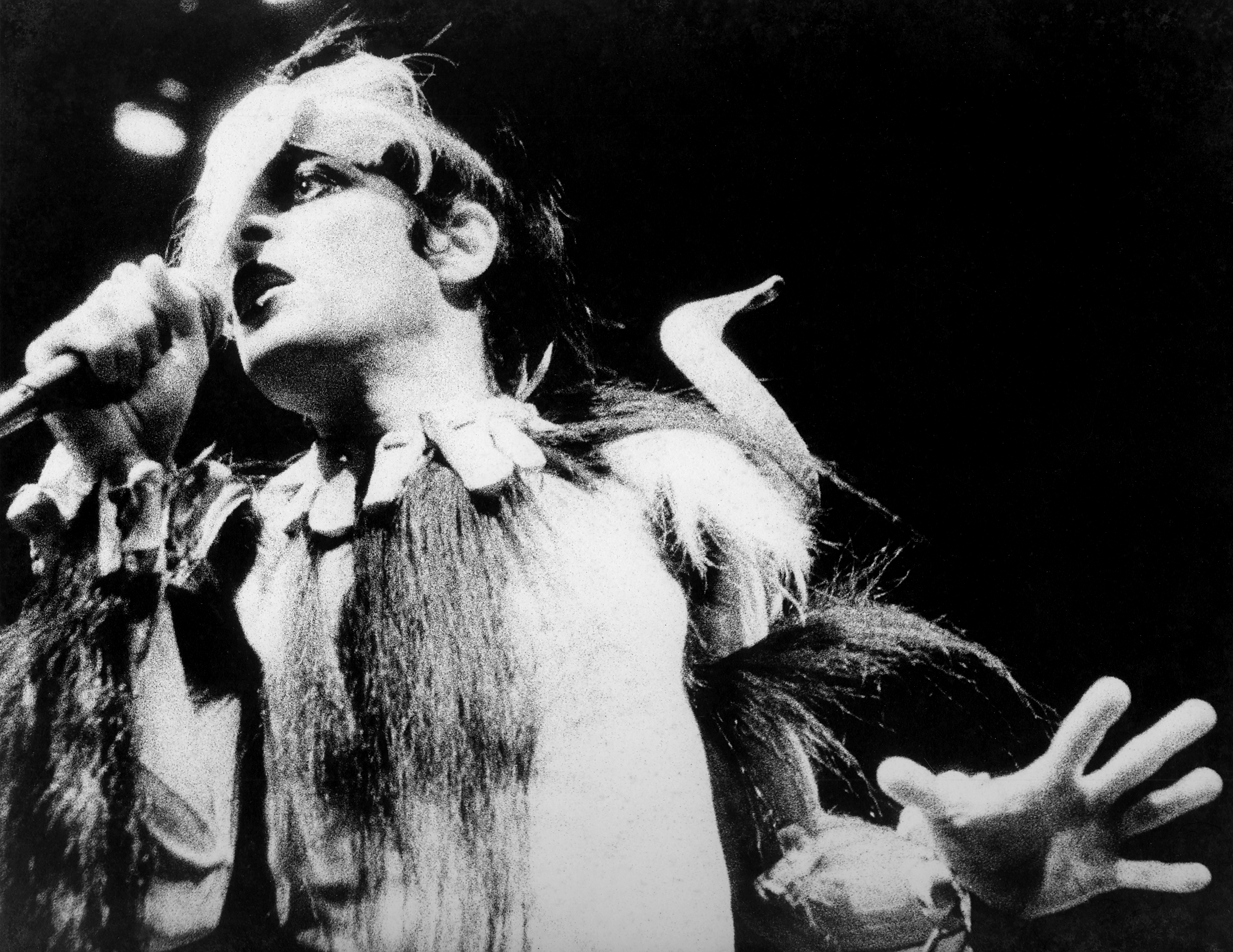
Ney Matogrosso '70s

According to the Brown University Center for Digital Scholarship, "Beyond Carnival: Male Homosexuality in Twentieth Century Brazil": "By late 1960s and early 1970s, international countercultural ideas held significant sway over Brazil's urban middle-class youth. Among the counterculture's many challenges to societal norms was the destabilization of sexual codes and gender norms. As traditional insistence of premarital virginity and normative heterosexuality became regarded as antiquated and repressive, Brazil's biggest stars projected unabashed sexuality and were rumored to have homosexual affairs. Singers such as Caetano Veloso and Ney Matogrosso presented themselves as androgynous, gender-bending performers and raised important questions in society about gender roles and identities. Indeed, the overwhelming popularity of such performers reflected a growing societal acceptance of deviance from traditional Brazilian constructions gender and sexuality." Further down the page, the study states "Ney Matogrosso, on the other hand, was far less subtle in his subversion of traditional notions of gender and sexuality. Ney often sang entire songs in falsetto, used dramatic makeup and exotic costumes, and danced in a style that was as traditionally feminine as it was traditionally masculine. In 1978, Ney clarified his homosexuality in a magazine interview, and, in the face of widespread homophobia, he remained one of Brazil's most famous celebrities".

In the 1970s he released a series of essential albums, both for his career and Brazilian popular music. They are: "Pecado" (Sin), "Bandido", "Feitiço" (Spell) and "Seu Tipo" (Your Type). In that period, Ney toured around the United States, Argentina, Uruguay, Europe and Israel, performing hits like "América do Sul" (Paulo Machado), "Bandolero" (Lucinha) and "Não Existe Pecado ao Sul do Equador" (Chico Buarque/Ruy Guerra). In the 1980s, Ney recorded "Por Debaixo dos Panos" (Cecéu), "Tanto Amar" (Chico Buarque), "Ando Meio Desligado" (Os Mutantes), "Sangue Latino" (João Ricardo/Paulo Mendonça) and "Vereda Tropical" (Gonzalo Curiel).

Ney Matogrosso opened the inaugural day of the first Rock in Rio festival on 11 January 1985, performing his song "América do Sul". The festival took place during Brazil's transition from military rule to civilian government, and the performance has been described as reflecting that historical context. During the performance, Matogrosso appeared wearing a G-string, an elaborate headdress, and carrying a jawbone. One contemporary review described his appearance as follows: "God save South America!... With his Indian-art deco look, wearing a G-string, a fancy headdress and a jawbone in his hand, Ney was the Neanderthal man to a new era, at ease on such a huge stage."

In 1986, Matogrosso performed for the first time without wearing fancy costumes, adopting a low-key image. Since then, he has focused on his work as a singer, recording from the traditional repertoire of MPB (Música popular brasileira – the so-called Brazilian pop music genre). Recordings in this genre first appeared on the album "O Pescador de Pérolas" (1986), which featured "O Mundo É um Moinho" (Cartola), "Dora" (Dorival Caymmi), "Da Cor do Pecado" (Bororó) and "Aquarela do Brasil" (Ary Barroso).

Ney toured with guitarist Raphael Rabello, with whom he recorded the album "À Flor da Pele" in 1990. Then, he made two albums as a tribute to Brazilian performers/songwriters, like Angela Maria ("Estava Escrito", 1994) and Chico Buarque ("Um Brasileiro", 1996).

Ney Matogrosso was asked to perform at the Montreux Jazz Festival in 1983 and 1994. The band and set list for his 1983 performance at the Casino was as follows: Ney Matogrosso, 9 July 1983, Casino Montreux Ney Matogrosso (voc), Ray Don (tp), Sergio Bore (perc), Pisca (g), Nono (tp), Jose Francisco De Lima (tb), Lino (s, fl), Otavio Bangla (s), Magrão (fl), Jacaré (kbds), Paulinho Esteves (kbds), Pedrão (b), Sergio Della Monica (dr), Dom Chacal (perc).

1. Metamorfose Ambulante
2. Notícias Do Brasil
3. Uai Uai
4. Primeiro De Abril
5. Nao Faz Sentido
6. Deixar Você
7. Tanto Amar
8. Instrumental
9. Andar Com Fé
10. Rosa De Hiroshima
11. Napoleão
12. Jonhy Pirou
13. Alegria Carnaval
14. Homem Com H
15. Folia No Matagal

When interviewed for Sounds and Colors magazine in 2014, he said, "I think deep down people admire the ones that have the courage to speak the truth. I never hid, what you see is what you get. On the other hand: in the first interviews I gave, they used to ask me about sex and I used to talk clearly about sex. Then I would read the article and it was written: 'About love…' I used to think: 'But I didn't speak about love, I spoke about sex!' They didn't have the courage because of the censorship back then." The only bad experience he had, Matogrosso says, was at the beginning of his career. "With Secos & Molhados, once, one crowd cursed me. I struck a gorgeous pose, they carried on cursing me and I told them to fuck themselves. Then the other half of the crowd, who wasn't cursing, applauded me. At that moment I realised I couldn't be afraid. If I showed that I was scared, they would eat me alive", he says. "But in my private life, never. On the contrary: I walk alone in the streets and never hear a thing. They hug me, they tell me beautiful things. I only get good things."

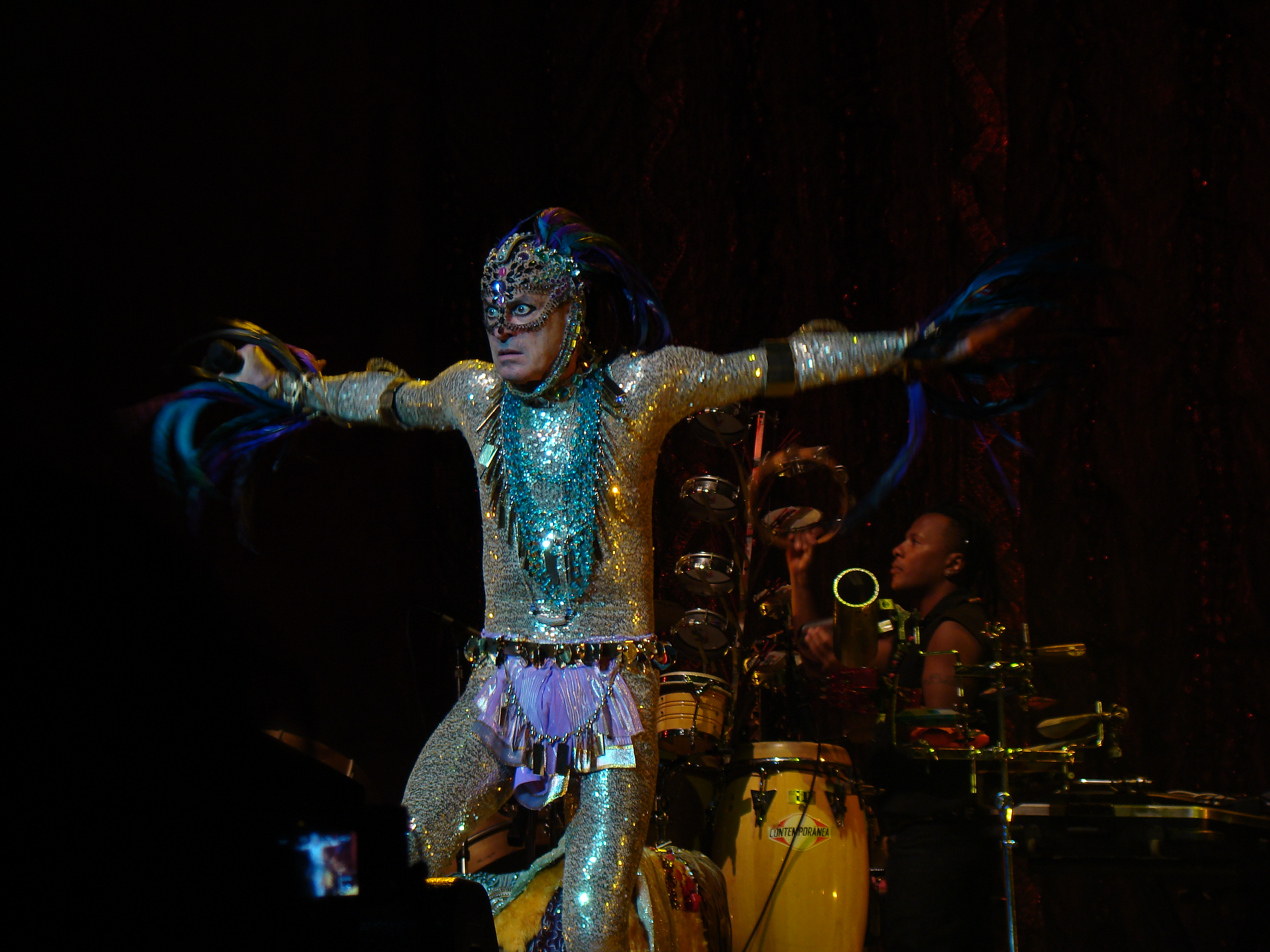
Ney Matogrosso in show

At the 2014 Latin Grammy Awards, the Latin Recording Academy honored him with the Lifetime Achievement Award. The academy stated that "Ranked by Rolling Stone magazine as one of the three greatest Brazilian singers of all time, Ney Matogrosso has recorded nearly 50 albums over a career that spans more than four decades. Influenced by the glam-rock movement of the '70s, Matogrosso became a member of the group Secos & Molhados. With his uncommon countertenor voice, energetic stage performances and eccentric costumes, he and the group became an overnight sensation. However, the union was short-lived and Matogrosso embarked on a solo career, garnering extraordinary success with hit singles such as "Homem Com H" and "Bandido Corazón." Leaving his androgynous glam-rock persona behind, in 1986, Matogrosso began working with emerging composers Cazuza and Vitor Ramil and revisited the traditional roots of Música Popular Brasileira. Forever regarded as challenging preconceptions and prejudices through his satiric and ironic performances, he has evolved into a very serious and well respected artist through his interpretations of classic standards. Matogrosso continues to tour and perform throughout Brazil and Europe."

He wrote his memoirs in a book entitled Vira-Lata de Raça, which was published in 2018.

In 2018, The Brazilian Embassy's Casa do Brasil cultural center presented "Ney Matogrosso – A Primordial Revolutionary," an exhibition of paintings by Greek artist Alkistis Michaelidou inspired by the Brazilian singer. The singer is an icon of contemporary Brazilian culture, and the exhibit has been shown in Athens, Greece and elsewhere.

In 2019, at the age of 77, Ney Matogrosso began a concert tour entitled "Bloco Na Rua" (Block on the Street). He kept the band from his "Atento De Sinais" tour. He continues to tour and record, his voice strong and form excellent.

Ney Matogrosso was portrayed by Jesuíta Barbosa in the 2025 biographical film Homem com H.

== Discography ==
=== Albums ===
- Água do Céu-Pássaro, also known as Homem de Neanderthal (1975)
- Bandido (1976)
- Pecado (1977)
- Feitiço (1978)
- Seu Tipo (1979)
- Sujeito Estranho (1980)
- Ney Matogrosso (1981)
- Mato Grosso (1982)
- ...Pois É (1983)
- Destino de Aventureiro (1984)
- Bugre (1986)
- Pescador de Pérolas (1987)
- Quem Não Vive Tem Medo da Morte (1988)
- Ney Matogrosso Ao Vivo (1989)
- À Flor da Pele (1990) – with Raphael Rabello
- As Aparências Enganam (1993) – with Aquarela Carioca
- Estava Escrito (1994)
- Um Brasileiro (1996)
- O Cair da Tarde (1997)
- Olhos de Farol (1999)
- Vivo (2000)
- Batuque (2001)
- Ney Matogrosso Interpreta Cartola (2002)
- Ney Matogrosso Interpreta Cartola Ao Vivo (2003)
- Vagabundo (2004) – with Pedro Luís e a Parede
- Canto em Qualquer Canto (2005)
- Vagabundo ao vivo (2005) – with Pedro Luís e a Parede
- Inclassificáveis (2008)
- Beijo Bandido (2009)
- Beijo Bandido Ao Vivo (2011)
- Atento aos Sinais (2013)

=== Extras ===
- A Floresta do Amazonas – Villa-Lobos (1988)
- Brazil Night – Ao Vivo em Montreux, Caetano Veloso, João Bosco, Ney Matogrosso (1983) – Recording of performance at Montreux Jazz Festival

=== Compilations ===
- Vinte e Cinco (1996)
- Juntos – Ney Matogrosso and Secos & Molhados

=== Appearances ===
- Secos e Molhados (1973)
- Secos e Molhados (1974)
- Gravado ao Vivo no Maracanãzinho (1980)
