= The Boy in the Mirror (film) =

2014 film directed by Guilherme Fiúza Zenha

O Menino no Espelho
- Theatrical release poster
- Directed by: Guilherme Fiúza Zenha
- Written by: Cristiano Abud; André Carreira; Guilherme Fiúza Zenha
- Based on: O Menino no Espelho by Fernando Sabino
- Produced by: André Carreira
- Starring: Lino Facioli; Mateus Solano; Regiane Alves; Laura Neiva; Giovanna Rispoli
- Cinematography: José Roberto Eliezer
- Production company: Camisa Listrada
- Distributed by: Downtown Filmes
- Release dates: 30 April 2014 (Cine PE); 19 June 2014
- Running time: 74 minutes
- Country: Brazil
- Language: Portuguese

The Boy in the Mirror (Portuguese: O Menino no Espelho) is a 2014 Brazilian fantasy adventure drama film directed by Guilherme Fiúza Zenha, based on the book of the same name by Fernando Sabino. The film stars Lino Facioli, Laura Neiva, Mateus Solano and Regiane Alves.

== Plot ==
Fernando is a kid who lives all his fantasies in an intense way and with a lot of imagination. He knows how to "fly" just like birds, living "adventures in the jungle", he builds planes and face the bullies from his school. Together with his friend Mariana and his dog Capeto, he commands a secret society and solves great mysteries like "a haunted house".

But Fernando is never satisfied and always looking to have more free time for his adventures. He wants to have a double someone who would definitely release all his troubles. His reflection in the mirror ends up becoming real just like magic. Odnanref, the mirror double, blindly obeys the wishes of Fernando, assuming his identity whenever he asks. Fernando goes on to live a dream life, the way he always wanted. But something happens when Cìntia, the older cousin of Fernando, arrives in town. Now he will have to resort to his true friends to make Odnanref return to the world of mirrors and thus regain control of his life.

== Cast ==
- Lino Facioli as Fernando / Odnanref
- Mateus Solano as Domingos
- Regiane Alves as Odete
- Laura Neiva as Cíntia
- Giovanna Rispoli as Mariana
- Ricardo Blat as Major Pape Faria
- Gisele Fróes as Teacher
- Murilo Grossi
