= Daniel Florêncio =

Brazilian born, British film maker

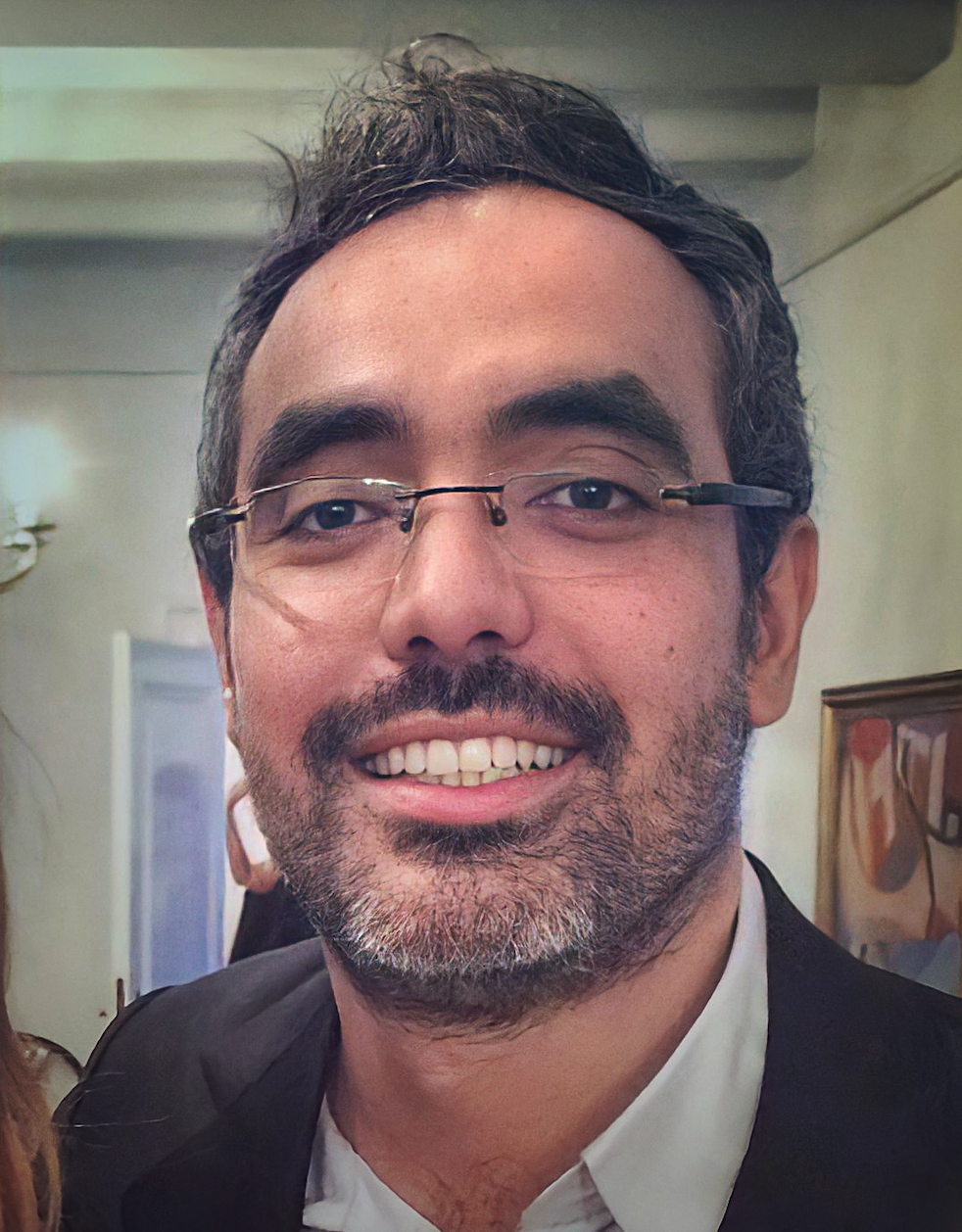
- Born: Belo Horizonte
- Alma mater: Federal University of Minas Gerais
- Occupation: Film producer, screenwriter, film director, film editor
- Website: www.imadeit-films.com/danielflorencio

Daniel Pereira Florêncio is a Brazilian-born British film director, writer and producer.

== Career beginnings ==
Daniel Florêncio studied Radio and TV at the Universidade Federal de Minas Gerais in Brazil. After graduating in 2005, he moved to London to pursue a Master in Arts and Media at the University of Westminster. After his Masters, he joined the BAFTA-winning BBC series The Secret Show as an editor., and remained in the United Kingdom, where he still resides.

For Current TV, the now extinct TV channel from former American vice-president Al Gore, he produced and directed the short-documentary Gagged in Brazil in 2008. The film portrays the economic pressure and censorship exerted over the press by Brazilian presidential hopeful, and then governor of the state of Minas Gerais, Aécio Neves. Through legal intimidation, the politician's team tried unsuccessfully to stop the film being broadcast.

== Film career ==
=== Awfully Deep (2010) ===
In 2010, he wrote, directed and produced the short film Awfully Deep, the first acting job of Lino Facioli, who went on to star as Robin Arryn in the HBO series Game of Thrones, and later as Dex on Netflix's Sex Education. The film won an Honourable Mention at the Athens International Film Festival in Ohio, and the Audience Award at the ShortShorts Film Festival in Tokyo. The film had a particular interest in France, being screened at the Clermont-Ferrand International Short Film Festival, at Utopiales in Nantes and at the L'etrange Film Festival in Paris. Later, it was broadcast on Canal+ on their show Mikrociné. It was also a finalist of the World Bank Film 4 Climate Competition.

=== Chasing Robert Barker (2015) ===
In 2013, Florêncio and his now wife, Maria Nefeli Zygopoulou, launched a Kickstarter crowdfunding campaign to shoot their first feature-film, titled Chasing Robert Barker. The script told the story of a paparazzo and was inspired by the documentary Tracking William: a Night with a Paparazzo, that Florêncio produced for Current TV. The campaign raised £50,000 and the film was produced through his production company I Made it Films, in partnership with Iceland's Pegasus Pictures (the Icelandic producer of Game of Thrones), and was launched in 2015. The following year the film received three nominations at the National Film Awards UK, winning Best Action Film. In 2016 the film was nominated for the Accession Award for Screenwriting at the East End Film Festival in London.

=== In production ===
Florêncio and Zygopoulou are currently developing a slate of projects and co-productions, including their next feature-film entitled In Arcadia.

== Filmography ==
Key
†	Indicates a documentary	‡	Indicates a short film

List of films by Daniel Florencio
Year	Title	Role	Notes	Awards and nominations
2005	A Brazilian Immigrant ^{†‡}	Director	Video documentary short	
2007	Tracking William: A Night with a Paparazzo ^{†}	Director	TV movie, documentary	
2008	The Battle for Rio ^{†}	Director	TV special	
2008	Gagged in Brazil ^{†‡}	Director		
2010	Awfully Deep ‡	Director, screenplay		Audience Award at the ShortShorts Film Festival in Tokyo (won), Athens International Film Festival (honorable mention)
2015	Chasing Robert Barker	Director, screenplay, producer	Feature-length film, crowdfunded	"Best Action Film" at the National Film Awards UK (won), "Accession Award for Screenwriting" at the East End Film Festival (nominated)
TBD	In Arcadia	Director, screenplay, producer	Feature-length film, in production	
