= Tattoo (2013 film) =

2013 film directed by Hilton Lacerda

Tatuagem
- Theatrical release poster
- Directed by: Hilton Lacerda
- Written by: Hilton Lacerda
- Produced by: João Vieira Jr.
- Starring: Jesuíta Barbosa; Irandhir Santos; Rodrigo García; Johnny Hooker
- Cinematography: Ivo Lopes Araújo
- Edited by: Mair Tavares
- Music by: DJ Dolores; Johnny Hooker
- Production company: Rec Produtores Associados
- Distributed by: Imovision
- Release dates: 2 October 2013 (Festival do Rio); 15 November 2013 (Brazil)
- Running time: 110 minutes
- Country: Brazil
- Language: Portuguese
- Budget: R$ 2,200,000

Tattoo (Portuguese: Tatuagem) is a 2013 Brazilian drama film written and directed by Hilton Lacerda in his directorial debut. It was awarded as the Best Picture at the 2013 Festival de Gramado.

== Plot ==
The film is set in Recife in the 70's, and follows the story of Clécio Wanderley, the leader of the theatrical troupe Chão de Estrelas, which performs concerts full of debauchery and nudity. One of the main stars of the team is Paulete, with whom Clécio maintains a friendship. One day, Paulete receives a visit from his brother-in-law, the young Fininha, who is in the army. Enchanted by the universe created by the Chão de Estrelas, he is soon seduced by Clécio. It doesn't take long for them to engage in a romantic relationship, which puts him in a dubious situation: while increasing the bounds with the troupe members, he needs to deal with the existing repression of the army during the dictatorship.

== Cast ==
- Irandhir Santos as Wanderley
- Jesuíta Barbosa as Araújo "Fininha"
- Rodrigo Garcia as Paulete
- Rafael Guedes as Depressílvio
- Sílvio Restiffe as Professor Joubert
- Sylvia Prado as Deusa
- Ariclenes Barroso as Gusmão

== Production ==
Several stories and real people inspired the plot of Tatuagem. The leader of the theatrical group Chão de Estrelas is based on the Argentine playwright Túlio Carella, who lived in Recife during the 60s. The theater company itself represents the actual experience of anarchic experiential troupe "Vivencial", which existed in the second half of the 70s.

After six weeks of preparation of cast, filming took place in the cities of Recife and Olinda in 2011.
