= Manu Gavassi (album) =

Studio album by Manu Gavassi
- Released: October 12, 2010
- Genres: Pop; teen pop; pop rock
- Length: 48:18
- Label: Midas Music
- Producer: Rick Bonadio · Andre Jung

Manu Gavassi chronology
Manu Gavassi (2010)	Clichê Adolescente (2013)

Singles from Manu Gavassi
- 1. "Garoto Errado" Released: June 11, 2010; 2. "Planos Impossíveis" Released: January 25, 2011; 3. "Odeio" Released: November 14, 2011; 4. "Você Já Deveria Saber" Released: February 27, 2012

Manu Gavassi is the debut album of Brazilian singer-songwriter Manu Gavassi. The album contains thirteen tracks, the sound is defined with strong influence on teen pop and pop rock. The first single from the album was Garoto Errado. The song was released on June 11, 2011 and peaked at number 22 in Brazil's Billboard Hot 100. The second single from the album was Planos Impossíveis and was released on January 25, 2011. The song received positive reviews from critics and peaked at number 26 in Brazil's Billboard Hot 100. The album was produced by Rick Bonadio and released through Universal Music Brazil's subsidiary, Midas Music, on October 12, 2010.

== Production ==
Produced by Rick Bonadio and Andre Jung, the album featured Adam Stevens, lead singer of the band Stevens, playing guitar in Você Tá Namorando. Lucas Silveira, lead singer of the band Fresno, composed Canta Comigo especially for Gavassi's debut album. In addition, Daniel Weksler, drummer of rock band NX Zero, recorded drums for the aforementioned song and for Tudo Que eu Quiser (Yeah).

== Track listing ==
All tracks are written by Manu Gavassi, except where noted.

Manu Gavassi – Deluxe edition
No.	Title	Length
1.	"Deixa Pra Lá"	2:58
2.	"Pode Falar"	2:53
3.	"Garoto Errado"	2:41
4.	"Planos Impossíveis"	4:23
5.	"Eu e Você"	3:20
6.	"Quatro Notas"	2:49
7.	"Você Tá Namorando" (featuring Adam Stevens)	3:24
8.	"Suspiros"	2:41
9.	"Canta Comigo" (featuring Daniel Weksler / co-written by Lucas Silveira)	3:19
10.	"Promete Pra Mim"	3:53
11.	"Pode Até Rolar" (co-written by Rick Bonadio and Erick Silver)	2:51
12.	"Cansei de Você"	2:49
13.	"Tudo Que Eu Quiser (Yeah)" (featuring Daniel Weksler / co-written by Rick Bonadio)	4:40
14.	"Odeio"	4:06
15.	"Você Já Deveria Saber"	3:40
Total length:		48:18
