= Deve ser horrível dormir sem mim =

Single by Manu Gavassi and Gloria Groove
- Language: Portuguese
- English title: "It Must Be Awful to Sleep Without Me"
- Released: 21 August 2020
- Genre: Alternative R&B; pop; synthpop
- Length: 2:35
- Label: Universal Brazil
- Songwriters: Daniel Garcia; Lucas Silveira; Manoela Gavassi; Tiago Abrahão
- Producers: Lucas Silveira; Tiago Abrahão

Manu Gavassi singles chronology
"Eu Te Quero" (2020)	"Deve ser horrível dormir sem mim" (2020)	"Eu nunca fui tão sozinha assim" (2021)

Gloria Groove singles chronology
"Incondicional" (2020)	"Deve ser horrível dormir sem mim" (2020)	"A Tua Voz" (2020)

Music video
- "Deve ser horrível dormir sem mim" on YouTube

"Deve ser Horrível Dormir sem Mim" (Portuguese: [ˈdɛvi ˈseʁ oˈʁivɛw doʁˈmiʁ ˈsẽj̃ ˈm], It Must Be Awful to Sleep Without Me) is a song by Brazilian singer Manu Gavassi featuring singer and drag queen Gloria Groove, released on August 21, 2020, by Universal Music. The song was written by the performers together with Lucas Silveira and Tiago Abrahão.

== Release and promotion ==
On August 12, 2020, Gavassi deleted all her photos from Instagram and the next day, she changed her profile name to her alter ego Malu Gabatti, a screenwriter and director, in addition to changing her hair color. Manu announced a partnership with Gloria Groove through an action/prank on TikTok, with the song being released on August 21, 2020.

The video for the song was also released on August 21, 2020, being directed by Manu Gavassi herself, being a 10-minute short film.

The music video stars the persona of Manu, Malu Gabatti, a renowned filmmaker from New York who teaches the formula to make a perfect pop video. The music video also features the participation of the actor — and Gavassi's ex-boyfriend — Chay Suede, actress Laura Neiva, producer Raony Phillips and actor Bruno Anacleto.

== Commercial performance ==
The song debuted at number 2 on the Top 50 of the most played songs on Spotify, becoming the highest position of his career and reached 3 million views in 24 hours.

The next day, with more than 1 million streams in 24 hours, the single grew by over 40,000 more streams on Spotify, allowing both Manu Gavassi and Gloria Groove to enter Spotify's Top 200 for the first time. Global, in 187th position in the ranking.

In addition, the song reached 1st place on Deezer's #39's Top 100 Brazil, 1st place on Apple Music's 39; Top 100 Brazil, 1st place on Tidal's, Top 100 Brazil and 2nd place on iTunes Brazil.

== Charts ==
Chart performance for "Deve ser horrível dormir sem mim"
Chart (2020)	Peak position
Brazil (Pro-Música Brasil)	13
Portugal (AFP)	199

== Certifications ==
Certifications for "Deve ser horrível dormir sem mim"
Region	Certification	Certified units/sales
Brazil (Pro-Música Brasil)	Diamond	300,000^{‡}
^{‡} Sales+streaming figures based on certification alone.

== Release history ==
Release history for "Deve ser horrível dormir sem mim"
Region	Date	Format(s)	Label	Ref.
Various	August 21, 2020	Digital download; streaming	Universal	
