= Latin Blood: The Ballad of Ney Matogrosso =

Homem com H
- Theatrical release poster
- Directed by: Esmir Filho
- Screenplay by: Esmir Filho
- Based on: Ney Matogrosso: A Biografia by Julio Maria
- Produced by: Marcio Fraccaroli; André Fraccaroli; Veronica Stumpf; Karla Amaral
- Starring: Jesuíta Barbosa; Caroline Abras; Hermila Guedes
- Cinematography: Azul Serra
- Edited by: Germano de Oliveira
- Music by: Amabis
- Production companies: Paris Filmes; Paris Entretenimento; Spcine; Claro
- Distributed by: Paris Filmes
- Release date: 1 May 2025
- Country: Brazil
- Language: Portuguese

Latin Blood: The Ballad of Ney Matogrosso (Portuguese: Homem com H, lit. 'Man with an M') is a 2025 Brazilian biographical musical drama film. It was written for the screen and directed by Esmir Filho, produced and distributed by Paris Filmes, and based on the book Ney Matogrosso: A Biografia by Julio Maria. Starring Jesuíta Barbosa as Ney Matogrosso, the film portrays the singer's rise to fame, his career and personal life, with a special highlight to his relationship with his late father and the bygone friendships and love affairs he made along the way.

== Synopsis ==
The film follows the different stages of singer Ney Matogrosso's career, from his childhood, through adolescence and into adulthood. It is a journey through time that shows a young man from humble origins who faces prejudice and becomes one of the most influential artists in Brazilian music.

== Cast ==
- Jesuíta Barbosa as Ney Matogrosso
- Caroline Abras as Yara Neiva
- Hermila Guedes as Beíta
- Bruno Montaleone as Marco de Maria
- Rômulo Braga as Antônio
- Lara Tremouroux as Regina
- Mauro Soares as João Ricardo
- Jullio Reis as Cazuza
- Pedro Zurawski as Sd. Araújo
- Jeff Lyrio as Gérson Conrad
- Sarah Oliveira as Fátima
- Bruno Parmera
- André Dale
- Metturo as Himself in the Audience - Bandeirantes Theater

== Release ==
The film premiered in theaters on May 1, 2025 and had its world premiere on May 6, 2025 during the closing of the 27th Paris Brazilian Film Festival.

== Reception ==
Homem com H has received generally positive reviews. Bruno Ghetti, from the newspaper Folha de S.Paulo, praised Jesuíta Barbosa's performance, saying that the actor "shows the breadth of his talent" in the film and that playing Ney Matogrosso was "the role that was missing" in his career. Walter Felix, in his column on UOL, also praised the actor, stating that he "shines with perfect characterization and impressive body work". Isabela Boscov said that the film "is as unique as Ney Matogrosso himself".
