= Futuro Beach =

2014 film by Karim Aïnouz

- Theatrical release poster
- Portuguese: Praia do Futuro
- Directed by: Karim Aïnouz
- Written by: Felipe Bragança; Karim Aïnouz
- Produced by: Geórgia Costa Araújo; Hank Levine
- Starring: Wagner Moura; Clemens Schick; Jesuíta Barbosa
- Cinematography: Ali Olay Gözkaya
- Edited by: Isabela Monteiro de Castro
- Music by: Hauschka
- Production companies: Coração da Selva; Hank Levine Film; Detailfilm; Watchmen Productions
- Distributed by: California Filmes (Brazil); Real Fiction (Germany)
- Release dates: 11 February 2014 (Berlin); 1 May 2014 (Brazil); 2 October 2014 (Germany)
- Running time: 106 minutes
- Countries: Brazil; Germany
- Languages: Portuguese; German
- Budget: $4 million
- Box office: $779,835

Futuro Beach (Portuguese: Praia do Futuro) is a 2014 drama film co-written and directed by Karim Aïnouz, and starring Wagner Moura, Clemens Schick and Jesuíta Barbosa. Shot in Fortaleza and Berlin, the film had its world premiere in the competition section of the 64th Berlin International Film Festival.

== Plot ==
When Donato, a lifeguard at Praia do Futuro, fails to rescue a drowning German tourist, he feels the tourist's death was his fault and begins a journey to escape from his present self. Donato leaves for Berlin in search of his German lover, Konrad, whom he had met ten years earlier at Praia do Futuro and saved from drowning. Whenever he drifts away, his younger brother, Ayrton, brings him back.

== Cast ==
- Wagner Moura as Donato
- Clemens Schick as Konrad
- Jesuíta Barbosa as Ayrton
- Sabine Timoteo as Heiko's wife
- Ingo Naujoks as Mechanic
- Emily Cox as Nanna
- Natascha Paulick as bartender
- Christoph Zrenner as school janitor
- Sophie Charlotte Conrad as Dakota
- Yannik Burwiek as Heiko's son
