= Adrift (2009 Brazilian film) =

2009 Brazilian film

- Film poster
- Directed by: Heitor Dhalia
- Written by: Heitor Dhalia
- Produced by: Andrea Barata Ribeiro; Bel Berlinck; Matias Mariani
- Starring: Laura Neiva; Vincent Cassel; Camilla Belle; Débora Bloch
- Cinematography: Ricardo Della Rosa
- Edited by: Gustavo Giani
- Music by: Antônio Pinto
- Production companies: Focus Features International; O2 Filmes
- Distributed by: Universal Pictures
- Release dates: 21 May 2009 (Cannes); 31 July 2009 (Brazil)
- Running time: 103 minutes
- Country: Brazil
- Language: Portuguese

Adrift (Portuguese: À Deriva) is a 2009 Brazilian drama film directed by Heitor Dhalia, starring Laura Neiva, Camilla Belle and Vincent Cassel. It competed in the Un Certain Regard section at the 2009 Cannes Film Festival.

== Plot ==
The film tells about Filipa (Laura Neiva), a 14-year-old girl who spends her holidays with her family in the town of Búzios, in Rio de Janeiro. While she discovers herself, facing passions and common challenges of adolescence, Filipa also has to deal with the extramarital relationship that her father, Matias (Vincent Cassel), has with Ângela (Camilla Belle), a neighbor of his beach house.

== Cast ==
- Laura Neiva as Filipa
- Vincent Cassel as Matias
- Camilla Belle as Ângela
- Débora Bloch as Clarice
- Gregório Duvivier as Lucas
- Max Huzar as Antônio
- Izadora Armelin as Fernanda
- Cauã Reymond as Barman
