= It's All Right! (TV series) =

Brazilian miniseries

- Brazilian Portuguese: Tá Tudo Certo
- Genre: Romantic comedy; Musical
- Created by: Felipe Simas
- Written by: Felipe Simas; Raphael Montes; Rubel Brisolla
- Directed by: Felipe Simas; Rodrigo César; Mayara Constantino
- Country of origin: Brazil
- Original language: Portuguese
- No. of seasons: 1
- No. of episodes: 4

Production
- Executive producer: Felipe Simas
- Production location: São Paulo
- Running time: 30 minutes
- Production companies: Nonstop; Formata Produções e Conteúdo

Original release
- Network: Disney+
- Release: April 12, 2023

It's All Right! (Portuguese: Tá Tudo Certo) is a Brazilian romantic comedy miniseries, which is produced by Nonstop and Formata Produções e Conteúdo in collaboration with F/Simas for the Walt Disney Company. The miniseries premiered on Disney+ on April 12, 2023. It was removed from the streaming service on May 26.

== Plot ==
Pedro dreams of becoming a famous musician. By chance, he meets the singer-songwriter Ana, who shows him the diversity of life and music. On his journey, Pedro begins to rethink his definition of success and must grapple with what he wants for his own future.

== Cast ==
- Pedro Calais as Pedro
- Ana Caetano as Ana
- Vitão as Vitão
- Toni Garrido as Toni
- Clara Buarque as Clara
- Julia Mestre as Julia
- Gita Delavy as Gita
- Manu Gavassi as Manu
- Agnes Nunes as Agnes

== Episodes ==
No. overall	No. in season	Title	Directed by	Written by	Original release date
1	1	"You Will See Me" "Pra Você me Perceber"	Unknown	Unknown	April 12, 2022
2	2	"A Colorful Tomorrow" "O Amanhã Colorido"	Unknown	Unknown	April 12, 2022
3	3	"A Universe of Things That I don't Know" "Universo de Coisas Que Eu Desconheço"	Unknown	Unknown	April 12, 2022
4	4	"Still Thinking" "Ainda Penso"	Unknown	Unknown	April 12, 2022
