= Débora Bloch =

Brazilian actress (born 1963)

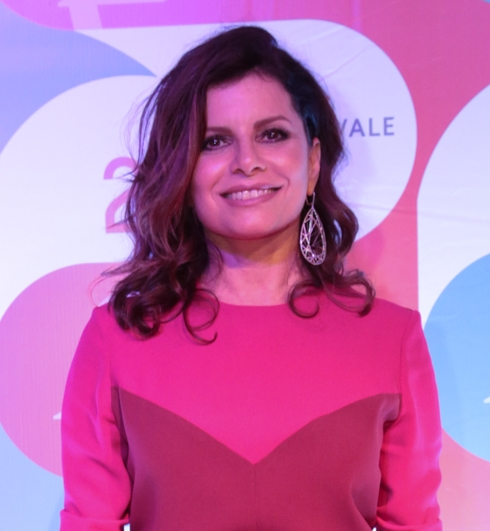
- Bloch at the 25th Brazilian Music Award in 2014.
- Born: 29 May 1963 (age 63); Belo Horizonte, Minas Gerais, Brazil
- Occupation: Actress
- Years active: 1980–present
- Spouse: Olivier Anquier (m. 1991; div. 2006)
- Children: 2
- Father: Jonas Bloch

Débora Bloch (born 29 May 1963) is a Brazilian actress. She is known nationally for participating in telenovelas such as Caminho das Índias, Cordel Encantado, and Avenida Brasil.

== Biography ==
Bloch was born in Belo Horizonte, Minas Gerais. She is daughter of actor Jonas Bloch, and is a descendant of Ukrainian Jewish immigrants.

Her contact with the performing arts began early, when, as a child, she and her sister accompanied their father to rehearsals and plays. At the age of seven, she saw her father fight fencing with Walmor Chagas in his backyard, during a Hamlet rehearsal. She grew up fascinated with the profession. At 17, after taking the course by Ivan Albuquerque, Rubens Corrêa and Amir Haddad at the Ipanema Theater; although she moved to two options in the entrance exam - History and Communication; she chose to pursue a career on stage.

== Personal life ==
From 1987 to 1989 she maintained a conjugal union with the director and photographer Edgar Moura, and from 1991 to 2006 she was married to the French chef and businessman Olivier Anquier. Together, the couple had two children, born by normal birth, in Rio de Janeiro: Júlia Bloch Anquier, born in 1993, and Hugo Bloch Anquier, born in 1997. Since the beginning of 2018 the actress has lived with her husband, the Portuguese producer João Nuno Martins in his apartment, in the south of Rio.

In interviews, the actress declared herself to be a feminist and in favor of legalizing abortion, so that poor women have the right to choose what to do with their bodies and their lives in minimal conditions of hygiene and safety. She also revealed that she had an abortion at the age of twenty, when she became pregnant with her first boyfriend and was starting her artistic career. She revealed that she never regretted this act, and that the procedure was safe, performed in a private practice of her own gynecologist, and that it was done with her boyfriend's money and consent at the time.

== Filmography ==
=== Film ===
Year	Title	Role
1984	Bete Balanço	Bete
1984	Noites do Sertão	Maria da Glória
1984	Patriamada	Carolina
1986	Sonho Sem Fim	Clara
1988	O Grande Mentecapto	Marialva
1994	Veja Esta Canção	Sandra
1995	Felicidade É...	Maria
1997	The Oyster and the Wind	Mãe de Marcela
2000	Bossa Nova	Tânia
2001	Caramuru: A Invenção do Brasil	Isabelle Vielmond, Marquesa de Sevilha
2009	Adrift	Clarice
2022	O Debate	Paula

=== Television ===
Year	Title	Roles	Notes
1981	Jogo da Vida	Lívia Ramos Cruz	
1982	Sol de Verão	Clara Porto Machado	
1983	Caso Especial	Jéssica	Episode: "Demônios do Posto Cinco"
1983	Caso Especial	Marcinha	Episode: "A Idade Sem Razão"
1985	Armação Ilimitada	Sandrinha	Episode: "Perdidos na Selva"
1985	Armação Ilimitada	Kate Machoney	Episode: "A Dama de Couro"
1986	Cambalacho	Ana Machado "Machadão"	
1987	Wandergleyson Show	Várias personagens	
1988–1992	TV Pirata	Various roles	
1990	A, E, I, O... Urca	Sílvia Donazzi	
1991	Doris para Maiores	Various roles	
1993	Deus Nos Acuda	Roberta	Episode: "27 de março"
1994	Confissões de Adolescente	Drª. Raquel Goldenstein	Episode: "Despertar da Primavera"; Episódio: "Uma Mulher Moderna"
1994	As Pupilas do Senhor Reitor	Margarida "Guida" da Silva	
1995	A Comédia da Vida Privada	Various roles	
1996	A Vida Como Ela É	Various roles	
1996	Salsa e Merengue	Teodora Bentes do Gama	
1998–99	Vida ao Vivo Show	Various roles	
1999	Andando nas Nuvens	Júlia Montana	
2000	A Invenção do Brasil	Isabelle de Avezac, Marquesa de Sevigny	
2001	A Grande Família	Maria de Fátima / Fernanda	Episode: "Papai Está com a Cachorra"
2001	Os Normais	Vivian	Episode: "Um Dia Normal"
2002	Os Normais	Diana	Episode: "Uma Amizade Normal"
2002	Os Normais	Suely	Episode: "Gente Normal e Civilizada"
2004	As 50 Leis do Amor	Bia	
2005	A Lua Me Disse	Maria Dorotéia "Madô" Sá Marques Dantas	
2005	Damas e Cavalheiros	Various roles	
2005	Toma Lá, Dá Cá: Piloto	Rita de Almeida Moreira	Telemovie
2006	JK	Dora Amar	
2007	Amazônia, de Galvez a Chico Mendes	Beatriz	
2007	Minha Nada Mole Vida	Ellen	Episode: "Noite de Queijos e Vinhos"
2008	Queridos Amigos	Helena "Lena" Fernandes Moretti	
2009	Caminho das Índias	Sílvia Cadore	
2010	Separação?!	Karin Vianna	
2011	Cordel Encantado	Duquesa Úrsula de Bragança	
2012	Avenida Brasil	Verônica Magalhães Queirós	
2013	Saramandaia	Risoleta Camargo	
2015	Sete Vidas	Lígia Fiúza Macedo	
2016	Tá no Ar: a TV na TV	Herself	Episode: "March, 8"
2016	Justiça	Elisa de Almeida	
2018	Treze Dias Longe do Sol	Gilda P. Ribeiro	
2018	Onde Nascem os Fortes	Rosinete Gouveia	
2019–2021	Segunda Chamada	Teacher Lúcia Marques Rocha	
2020	Diário de Um Confinado	Adelaide	
2022–2023	Mar do Sertão	Deodora	
2024	No Rancho Fundo	Deodora Montijo / Deodora Limeira Aguiar	
2025	Vale Tudo	Odete Almeida Roitman	

== Awards and nominations ==
=== APCA Awards ===
Year	Category	Nominee / work	Result
1982	Best Promising Actress in Television	Sol de Verão	Won
1985	Best Performance by an Actress in a Motion Picture	Noites de Sertão	Won
1994	Best Performance by an Actress in a Motion Picture	Veja Esta Canção	Won
2016	Best Performance by an Actress in Television	Justiça	Nominated
2018	Best Performance by an Actress in Television	Segunda Chamada	Won

=== Art Quality Brazil Awards ===
Year	Category	Nominee / work	Result
2004	Best Featured Actress in a Play – Drama	Tio Vânia	Won
2005	Best Supporting Actress – Television	A Lua Me Disse	Nominated
2007	Best Actress in a TV Series or Special Project	Amazônia, de Galvez a Chico Mendes	Nominated
2008	Best Actress in Minisseries or Telemovie	Queridos Amigos	Nominated
2010	Best Actress in a TV Series or Special Project	Separação?!	Nominated
2011	Best Supporting Actress – Television	Cordel Encantado	Nominated

=== Best of the Year – Globe Awards ===
Year	Category	Nominee / work	Result
2016	Best Actress in a Series, Minisseries or Serial Film	Justiça	Nominated

=== Brasília Film Festival ===
Year	Category	Nominee / work	Result
1984	Candango for Best Actress	Noites de Sertão	Won

=== Cartagena Film Festival ===
Year	Category	Nominee / work	Result
1984	Best Actress	Noites de Sertão	Won

=== Contigo! Awards ===
Year	Category	Nominee / work	Result
1996	Best Comedy Actress – Television	Salsa e Merengue	Won
2009	Best Actress in a Motion Picture – Drama	À Deriva	Nominated
2011	Best Actress in a TV Series or Minisseries	Separação?!	Nominated
2019	Best Actress in a TV Series or Minisseries	Segunda Chamada	Nominated

=== Extra Television Awards ===
Year	Category	Nominee / work	Result
2016	Best Actress	Justiça	Nominated
2016	Best Supporting Actress	Onde Nascem os Fortes	Nominated

=== Gramado Film Festival ===
Year	Category	Nominee / work	Result
1984	Kikito for Best Actress	Noites de Sertão	Won

=== Grande Otelo ===
Year	Category	Nominee / work	Result
2010	Best Actress in a Leding Role	À Deriva	Nominated

=== Guarani Film Festival ===
Year	Category	Nominee / work	Result
2001	Best Supporting Actress	Caramuru: A Invenção do Brasil	Nominated
2002	Best Supporting Actress	Bossa Nova	Nominated
2010	Best Actress	À Deriva	Nominated

=== Press Trophy ===
Year	Category	Nominee / work	Result
1983	Outstanding Performance by an Newcomer Artist	Sol de Verão	Nominated
1997	Outstanding Performance by an Actress in a Telenovela	Salsa e Merengue	Won

=== Quem Awards ===
Year	Category	Nominee / work	Result
2012	Best Supporting Actress – Television	Avenida Brasil	Nominated
2013	Best Leading Actress – Television	Saramandaia	Nominated
2015	Best Leading Actress – Television	Sete Vidas	Nominated
2016	Best Leading Actress – Television	Justiça	Nominated

=== Shell Awards ===
Year	Category	Nominee / work	Result
1990	Best Featured Actress in a Play	Fica Comigo Esta Noite	Won
2016	Best Featured Actress in a Play	Os Realistas	Nominated
