= Clichê Adolescente =

Studio album by Manu Gavassi
- Released: August 30, 2013
- Genre: Pop · folk
- Length: 41:24
- Label: Midas Music
- Producer: Rick Bonadio

Manu Gavassi chronology
Manu Gavassi (2010)	Clichê Adolescente (2013)	Vício (2015)

Singles from Clichê Adolescente
- 1. "Conto de Fadas" Released: September 18, 2012; 2. "Clichê Adolescente" Released: April 22, 2013; 3. "Segredo" Released: November 17, 2013

Clichê Adolescente is the second studio album by Brazilian singer-songwriter Manu Gavassi. It was released on August 30, 2013 on iTunes and on November 29, 2013 in physical stores through Midas Music. The album was produced by Rick Bonadio, same producer of her debut album.

== Track listing ==
All tracks are written by Manu Gavassi

Standard edition
No.	Title	Length
1.	"Caminho de Volta"	3:11
2.	"Se Eu Te Abraço"	3:51
3.	"Clichê Adolescente"	3:27
4.	"Cicatriz"	3:33
5.	"Segredo" (featuring Chay Suede)	3:50
6.	"Eu Me Proibo"	3:12
7.	"O Fim"	3:44
8.	"Meio Sorriso"	3:02
9.	"Eu Dou Risada"	3:10
10.	"Talvez"	3:19
11.	"Conto de Fadas" (Acoustic)	4:14
12.	"Clichê Adolescente" (Acoustic)	3:30
