= Bald Mountain (film) =

2013 film directed by Heitor Dhalia

- Theatrical release poster
- Portuguese: Serra Pelada
- Directed by: Heitor Dhalia
- Written by: Heitor Dhalia; Vera Egito
- Produced by: Andrezza de Faria; Wagner Moura; Tatiana Quintella
- Starring: Juliano Cazarré; Júlio Andrade; Sophie Charlotte; Wagner Moura; Matheus Nachtergaele
- Cinematography: Lito Mendes da Rocha
- Edited by: Márcio Hashimoto Soares
- Music by: Antonio Pinto
- Production company: Paranoid
- Distributed by: Warner Bros. Pictures
- Release date: 18 October 2013 (Brazil)
- Running time: 100 minutes
- Country: Brazil
- Language: Portuguese
- Budget: R$ 10 million
- Box office: $1,908,156

Bald Mountain (Portuguese: Serra Pelada) is a 2013 Brazilian Western drama film co-written and directed by Heitor Dhalia, starring Juliano Cazarré, Júlio Andrade, Sophie Charlotte, Wagner Moura, and Matheus Nachtergaele.

The film follows the story of two men in Serra Pelada, one of the largest mines in the world.

== Plot ==
The friends Juliano (Juliano Cazarré) and Joaquim (Júlio Andrade) leave São Paulo in search of the dream of gold. The year is 1978. The two arrive at the Amazon jungle as so many other thousands of men arrived. Full of dreams and illusions. But life in the camp changes everything. The obsession with wealth and power destroys them. Juliano becomes a gangster. Joaquim leaves all his values behind.

== Cast ==
- Juliano Cazarré as Juliano
- Júlio Andrade as Joaquim
- Sophie Charlotte as Thereza
- Wagner Moura as Lindo Rico
- Matheus Nachtergaele as Carvalho
- Eline Porto as Izabel
- Lyu Arisson as Marcelo
- Edmilson Cordeiro as Josias
- Silvero Pereira as Severino
- Démick Lopes as Maria Y
- Jesuíta Barbosa as Navalhada
- Adriano Barroso as Lindomar
- Rose Tuñas as Bereka
- Alysson Amaral as Caboclo
- Oswaldo Eugênio as Nego Diamante
- Leonel Ferreira as Felicio

== Production ==
=== Development ===
The director Heitor Dhalia said to UOL that Serra Pelada was the hardest movie he ever made. "When I had the idea of the film, I thought: ' why had nobody thought of doing this movie before? ' And when I was filming I understood why. It was almost impossible to be done. It was very complex. It was the hardest film I've ever done".

According to Dhalia, it was hard to tell the story of a camp which focused on men living in precarious conditions and facing orders from the owners of the operating areas. "We're talking about a fairly important Brazilian event of our recent history. The biggest gold rush of the modern era. Highest concentration of manual labor since the pyramids of Egypt, which had 4,000 men. In Serra Pelada there were around 100,000 men working".

=== Filming ===
The film was going to be shot in Pará, but ended up being filmed in Paulínia, São Paulo, after Vale and the Amazonian State Government denied support for the production.

The producer Tatiana Quintella confirmed that Vale vetoed the filming in Pará, but explained that running the production there would have been unworkable. "We had no budget for the logistics and security of our team. So we decided to shoot the film in São Paulo".
