= East End Film Festival =

Film festival in London, England

- Location: London, England
- Founded: 2000
- Disestablished: 2020
- Website: eastendfilmfestival.com

The East End Film Festival (EEFF) was one of the UK's largest film festivals. Founded in 2000 and operating in various venues across East London, the festival focused on emerging British, Eastern European, and Asian films. It ceased operations on March 4, 2020 due to the COVID-19 pandemic.

== History ==
=== 2000–2005 ===
The East End Film Festival began in 2000, originally set up by the London Borough of Tower Hamlets as a platform to recognise local filmmakers. In 2003, the festival established a partnership with neighbouring London Borough of Hackney, London Borough of Newham, the Lee Valley Regional Park Authority, and the Raindance Film Festival, which ran Raindance East as part of its official selection. As a result of this partnership, the festival was rebranded as Raindance East from 2003 to 2005, but returned to East End Film Festival in 2006.

=== 2006 ===
In 2006, the East End Film Festival opened with the London premiere of Richard E. Grant's directorial debut Wah-Wah. Grant attended the premiere, acted as the festival's Director-In-Residence, and took part in a Q&A session introducing a special festival screening of Robert Altman's Nashville. Producer-In-Residence Stephen Woolley also took part in a Q&A following a screening of his film The Crying Game.

=== 2007 ===
The 2007 festival opened with the world premiere of With Gilbert And George, a portrait of Spitalfields-based contemporary artists Gilbert And George, followed by a Q&A with director Julian Cole. The 2007 programme also included a preview of Joe Strummer: The Future Is Unwritten plus a conversation with the film's director, Julien Temple.

=== 2008 ===
The festival opened in 2008 with the London premiere of independent British feature The Waiting Room. The film's director Roger Goldby and lead actor Ralf Little attended the opening night premiere. The screening was followed by a party at Beach Blanket Babylon in Shoreditch. The festival also included a showcase of films exploring teenage angst (including two earlier films starring Elliot Page), a selection of new British features, and films from Eastern Europe, as well as a collection of shorts.

=== 2009 ===
In 2009, the festival focused on films portraying East End and multicultural London life. The program included City Rats, Elevator, British filmmakers Nicola and Teena Collins' debut film The End, Junior Eurovision Song Contest documentary Sounds Like Teen Spirit, discussion panel The London Perambulator, and Another Dimension And How To Get There. There was also a screening of Not In Our Name at Amnesty International's Human Rights Action Centre. The 2009 East End Film Festival trailer, directed and designed by Lucy Izzard, an animation director and illustrator at Slinky Pictures, featured a variety of comic characters visiting festival venues including Rich Mix, the Whitechapel Gallery, and the Genesis Cinema.

=== 2010 ===
The 2010 East End Film Festival took place between 22 and 30 April. Actress Jaime Winstone was announced as a new festival patron for 2010. The full programme was announced at an event at The Brickhouse in East London on 23 March 2010 by festival director Alison Poltock. The festival kicked off on 22 April with a preview screening of Barney Platts-Mills' 1969 film Bronco Bullfrog (set in Stratford, East London, and starring local children) prior to its re-release that summer. Highlights included Mark Donne's The Rime of the Modern Mariner, narrated by musician Carl Barat; SUS, based on the 1979 play about Margaret Thatcher's "stop and search" laws by Barrie Keeffe; and a series of events commemorating Rock Against Racism, the grassroots movement against the National Front in the late 1970s. There was also a free screening of Alfred Hitchcock's silent film The Lodger in Spitalfields Market, accompanied by an improvised soundtrack performed live by Minima.

=== 2011 ===
For the 10th anniversary of the festival in 2011, the focus of the program was the history of East London, with a programme featuring more than 60 feature films and hundreds of shorts, alongside an accompanying program of live, site-specific events and master classes. The festival opened on 27 April with the world premiere of Roger Sargent's The Libertines: There Are No Innocent Bystanders, a feature documentary about The Libertines' reunion in 2010. The festival also included the UK's second-ever screening of Ken Russell's controversial 1971 film The Devils. EEFF 2011 saw the launch of Movie May Day, a May Bank Holiday weekend film and cultural event with hundreds of free screenings, projections, live music, quizzes, filmmaking competitions, and site-specific installations across the East End.

=== 2012 ===
The 11th East End Film Festival opened on 3 July 2012 with the UK Premiere of a documentary about Amy Winehouse. The festival closed on 8 July with the UK premiere of Armando Bo's El último Elvis, an Argentinian feature film about a delusional Elvis Presley impersonator. Armando Bo returned to the festival in 2013 as a member of the panel jury for that year. The festival's fringe event, CineEast, took place on 1 July with a day of free events featuring short and feature film screenings, live music, talks, workshops, film trails and competitions, incorporating over 1,000 films and site-specific events in over 100 different venues, including cinemas, cultural spaces, shops, restaurants and art galleries.

=== 2013 ===
The 12th East End Film Festival ran from 25 June until 10 July, opening with the world premiere of Mark Donne's documentary The UK Gold at the Troxy. The EEFF closed with Rob Epstein and Jeffery Friedman's Lovelace, a biopic following the story of Linda Lovelace. 2013's Best Film Award went to Halley, which follows the story of a security guard at a Mexico City gym whose health drastically begins to deteriorate. Sebastian Hofmann's award meant he returned to the festival in 2014 as the EEFF's Director-In-Residence, and co-curator for the festival's Mexican focus.

=== 2014 ===
The 13th East End Film Festival opened on 13 June 2014 with the world premiere of Dermaphoria, the feature debut from East End filmmaker Ross Clarke. Genesis Cinema, the festival's original venue, hosted the opening night. The festival closed on 25 June, with Jack Bond's The Blue Black Hussar, a documentary exploring the life of Adam Ant.

=== 2015 ===
The 14th East End Film Festival ran from 1 July until 12 July 2015, opening with the international premiere of Amit Gupta's third feature One Crazy Thing, starring and produced by EEFF alumnus Ray Panthaki. The festival closed with a documentary by Marc Silver, on the aftermath of a tragic incident at a gas station in Jacksonville, Florida, which resulted in the death of 17-year-old Jordan Davis.

=== 2016 ===
The 15th edition of the East End Film Festival opened on 23 June 2016 with the world premiere of London-based Ian Bonhôte's feature debut Alleycats, featuring John Hannah as a corrupt MP. The festival also hosted the UK premiere of Daniel Florencio's feature debut, Chasing Robert Barker, about a photographer turned paparazzi caught in the downward spiral of a fabricated tabloid story. The EEFF closed with Steve Read and Rob Alexander's London premiere of Gary Numan: Android in La La Land, a documentary following Numan as he returns to the world stage and moves to California.

=== 2017 ===
The 16th edition of the festival took place each weekend in June 2017. The programme included the biopic of rapper Tupac Shakur, All Eyez on Me, and the world premiere of My Name Is Lenny, which features one of John Hurt's final performances.

=== 2018 ===
The 17th edition of the East End Film Festival was held from 11 to 29 April 2018. The festival opened with the documentary Boom for Real: The Late Teenage Years of Jean-Michel Basquiat, directed by Sara Driver.

=== 2019–2020 ===
The festival ceased operations on 4 March 2020 due to the COVID-19 pandemic. The owner, Alison Poltock, stated that "the push to provide a more mainstream commercial offering is not for us."

== Awards ==
The festival presented a number of awards each year at its closing ceremony, including:

- Best UK Short Film
- Best UK First Feature
- Best International First Feature
- Best Documentary Feature
- Short Film Audience Award

== Patrons ==
Patrons included Danny Boyle, Steven Berkoff, Tony Grisoni, Asif Kapadia, Michael Nyman, Paweł Pawlikowski, Nitin Sawhney, Jason Solomons, Parminder Vir, Jaime Winstone, Jeremy Wooding, Stephen Woolley, and Joe Wright.
