= Android in La La Land =

2016 documentary film

Android In La La Land
- Directed by: Steve Read, Rob Alexander (co-director)
- Written by: Tony Palmer
- Produced by: Rob Alexander
- Cinematography: Steve Read
- Edited by: Ollie Huddleston
- Music by: Gary Numan
- Release date: August 26, 2016
- Running time: 85 minutes
- Country: United States
- Language: English
- Box office: $23,121

Android in La La Land is a 2016 documentary film about musician Gary Numan, focusing on his attempts to return to the US and his move to Los Angeles, California (the "La La Land" in the documentary title). It was directed by Steve Read and Rob Alexander.

== Plot ==
The documentary follows Numan for an entire year on his move to the US to try to become successful in that market, launch a career in Hollywood and go back to the studio to record after an absence of nearly ten years.
