= Manu Gavassi =

Brazilian singer-songwriter and actress (born 1993)

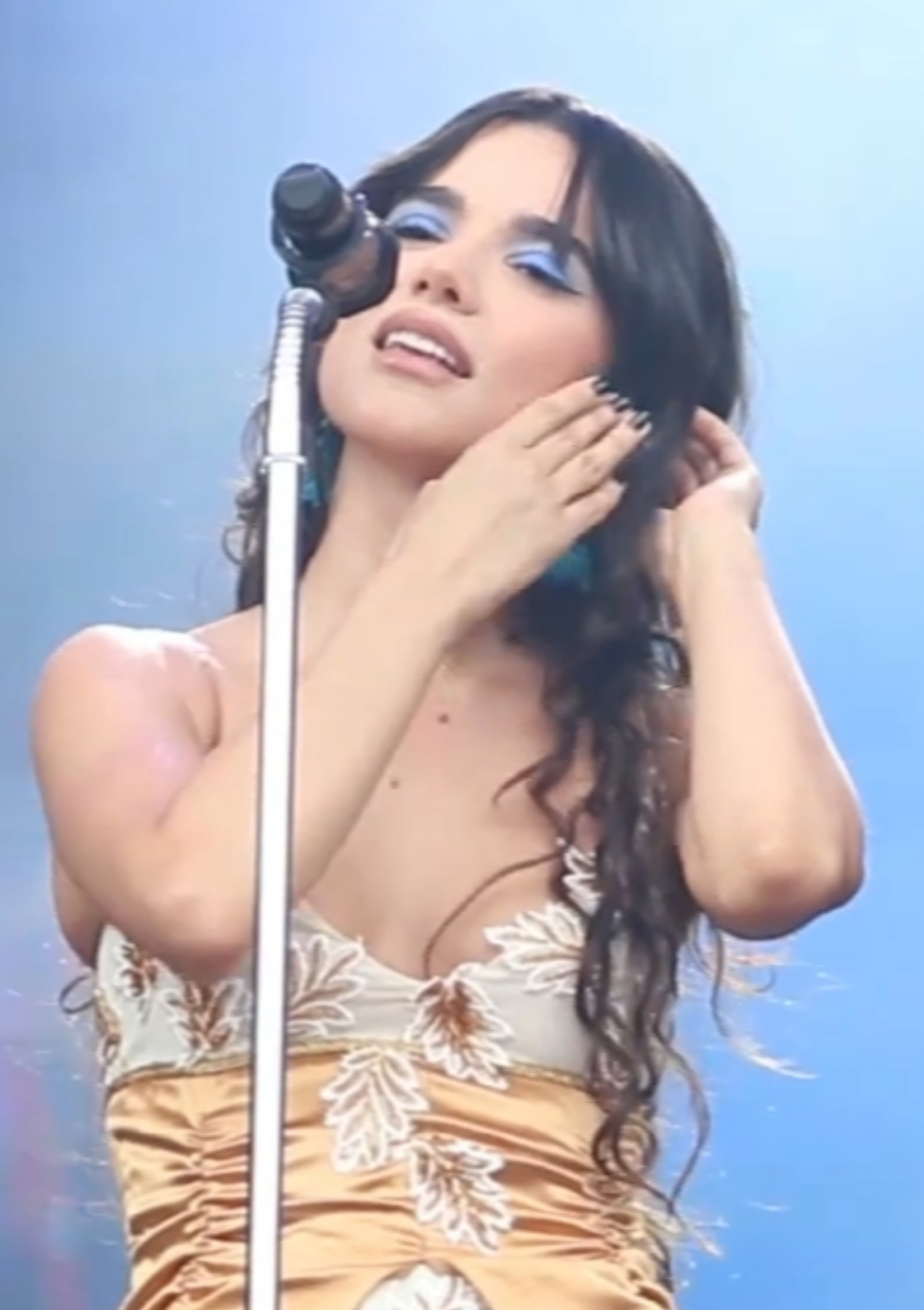
- Gavassi in 2023
- Born: Manoela Latini Gavassi Francisco; January 4, 1993 (age 33); São Paulo, Brazil
- Occupations: singer; songwriter; actress; presenter; director; screenwriter; producer; voice actress; writer
- Years active: 2009–present
- Parent(s): Zé Luis (father); Daniela Gavassi (mother)
- Relatives: Catarina Gavassi (younger sister)
- Musical career
- Genres: pop
- Instruments: vocal; guitar
- Labels: Midas Music (2010–15); Universal Music (2016–present)

Manoela Latini Gavassi Francisco (Brazilian Portuguese: [mɐnuˈɛlɐ ɡavaˈsi]; born January 4, 1993), better known as Manu Gavassi, is a Brazilian singer, songwriter and actress.

== Early life ==
Born and raised in São Paulo, she is the daughter of broadcaster and presenter Zé Luiz and psychologist and artist Daniela Gavassi. She has one sister, fashion student Catarina Gavassi. At age 12, she learned from her father how to play the guitar and wrote her first song at age 13. At 19, she left her parents' house to live alone in an apartment and took acting classes in the state capital.

== Career ==
=== 2009–11: Manu Gavassi ===
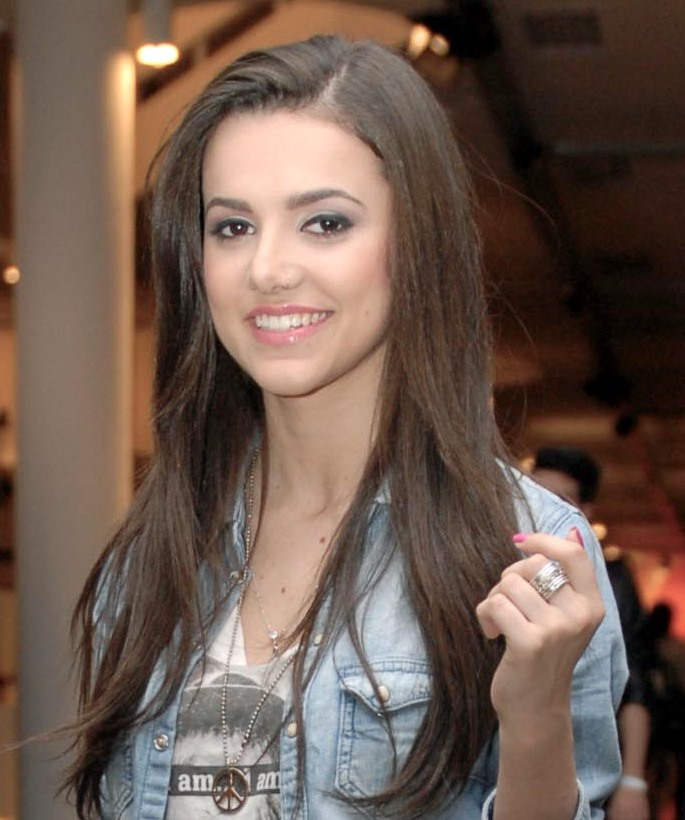
Manu in 2011

She began her career in 2009 through Capricho magazine, participating in Galera Capricho, modeling in fashion editorials and being part of behavioral articles for the magazine. Karol Pinheiro, one of Capricho's reporters at the time, found out that Manu was singing and requested the singer's video for him on the magazine's website. With a big réaction to the video, Manu went on to cover songs by singers Justin Bieber and Taylor Swift and publicized her past songs through her own YouTube channel. Her father, broadcaster Zé Luiz, sent some videos of her singing to producer Rick Bonadio, who found the material interesting and invited the singer to be part of his record label Midas Music, she recorded her first studio album under the label.

Manu then began work on her self-titled album, which was recorded in just two months and released on August 31, 2010. Her first single "Garoto Errado" was released a week before the album's release. The singer's first show took place on September 18 through the event NoCapricho 2010. In February 2011, she released the single "Planos Impossíveis". In 2011, her song "Garoto Errado" was also on the soundtrack of the soap opera Rebelde on Record. The singles "Garoto Errado" and "Planos Impossíveis" both received gold record by Pro-Música Brasil. In November, she released the last single from her album, "Odeio". The music video was released exclusively through the painting Garagem do Faustão, shown on the program Domingão do Faustão. In the same month she made her debut as an actress, making a cameo in the series Julie e os Fantasmas as Debora.

=== 2012–14: Clichê Adolêscente and acting ===
In February 2012, Gavassi released the single Você Já Deveria Saber. In June, she recorded the songs "O Céu Eu Vou Tocar" and "Ao Ar Livre", for the soundtrack of the movie Brave, as a lullaby for the adventures of brave princess Marilda. In September, "Conto de Fadas", was released, the first single from her second album. The song was among the top ten on iTunes Brazil. In April 2013 she released the second single, "Clichê Adolescente", a track that has the same name as the album, and in November the third and last single was released, "Segredo", with the participation of former boyfriend Chay Suede. The album was released on November 29 and featured a mini documentary published through her YouTube channel. In January 2014, she was invited by the Mexican singer Dulce María to do a duet in Portuguese of the song "Antes Que Ver El Sol", the song itself was released in August.

In February, she made her debut in the soap opera Em Familia playing the singer Paulinha. In December, she played villain Vicki in the Twenty-second season of Malhação. Manu was only going to take part in the plot, but due to the success of her character, at the request of the fans, she returned and remained until the end of the series. In December, she released her new single, "Esse Amor Tão Errado", which featured a music video recorded in Los Angeles and was featured in the Young Afternoon compilation.

=== 2015–16: Vício and movie debut ===
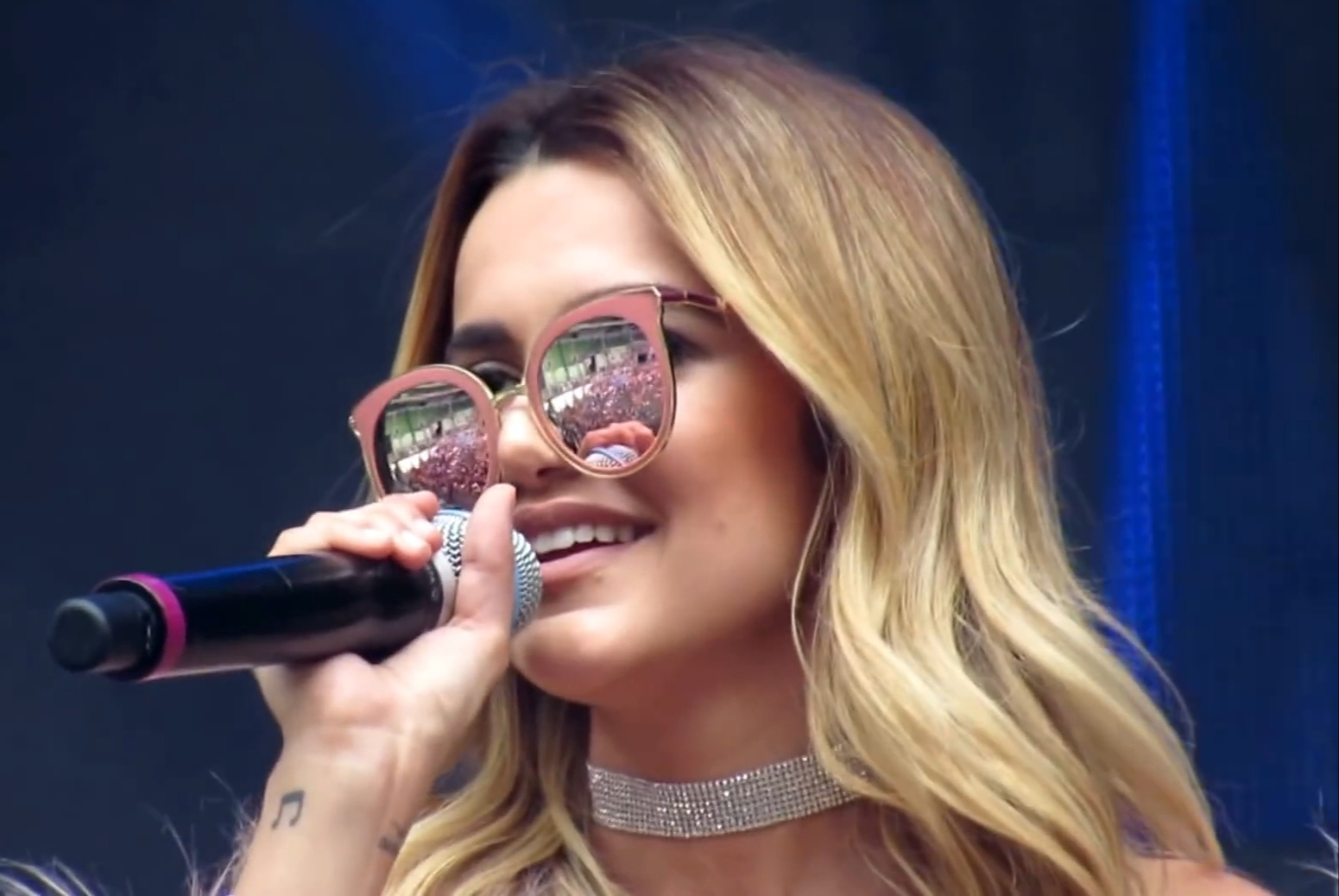
Manu in 2016

In 2015, she started recording music for the first concert titled Vício. In November, "Camiseta" was released, the first single from the EP. Vício was released on December 11 with five unreleased tracks. All EP production was signed by singer Junior Lima and bassist Dudinha Lima. The second single "Direção" was released in February 2016 and the music video of the song was attended by actor Rafael Vitti On March 6 she started the Vício Tour in São Paulo, being the first tour of her career. In May, she released the single "Vício".

The song's music video was released in two parts, and fans had to donate a specific amount of blood for it to be released. With the Fundação Pró-Sangue, as a partnership, the Play For Life campaign aimed to encourage donation from the singer's fans. In October, she released "Sozinha", the last single from the EP. In November 2016, she began filming her first movie Socorro, Virei Uma Garota playing the protagonist Melina. The feature is scheduled to premiere in August 2019. In December 2016, she signed to Universal Music, while also continuing the recordings of her third studio album.

=== 2017–19: Manu, debut as a writer and Cute but Psycho ===
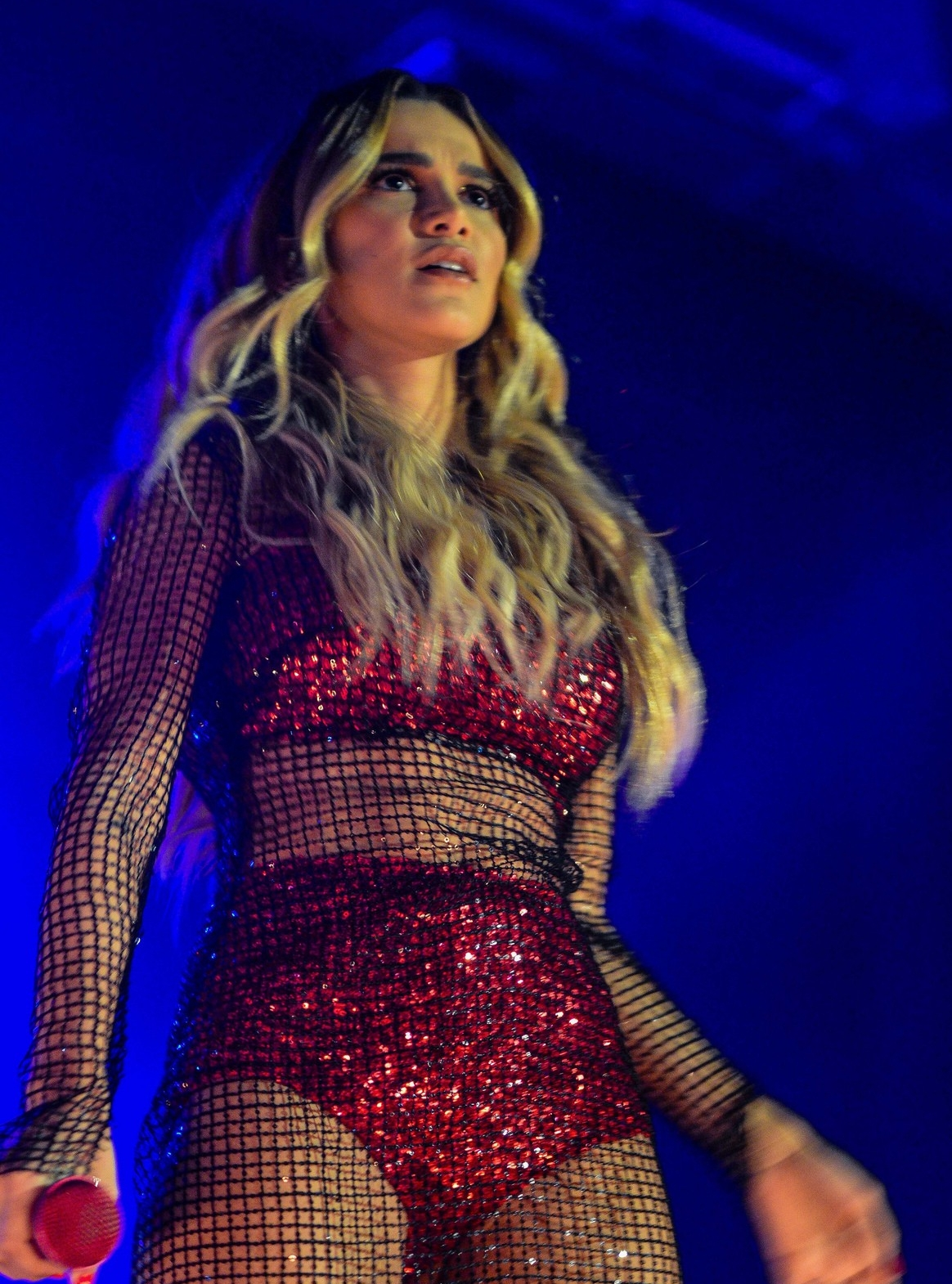
Gavassi in 2017

On April 7, 2017, she released her third studio album titled Manu. That same day, the single Hipnose, the lead single of her new album was released. The Manu Tour started on May 18, in Campinas. In July she made a cameo appearance in the series Planeta B, which was shown at Multishow, playing serial killer Josephine. In August, "Muito Muito" was released, the second single from the album, with the direction and script of the music video made by the singer herself. In November, she publishes her debut book, Olá Caderno!, through the publisher Rocco. In February 2018, she directed the clip of the song "Clareiamô" by duo Anavitória. In March, she released the single "Me Beija", with a music video full of references to the 2000s. In June, she released a single in collaboration with Portuguese singer Agir, a new version of the song "Ninguém Vai Saber", a song that she previously released solo on the album Manu. She was also invited by the singer for a performance of the song at Rock in Rio Lisboa.

In 2018, she starred in a Z4 series where she played the choreographer Pâmela Toledo. In December, the EP Cute but Psycho was released with three tracks. she released it with the participation of actor João Vithor Oliveira. In the same month, she launched a life-based web series entitled Garota Errada on her YouTube channel, which was directed and scripted by her. In May 2019, the EP MINIDocs Nashville was released with four redone tracks as a way to celebrate her ten-year career. Recorded in Nashville, the EP ranked # 1 on iTunes Brazil. In September, the singer released the EP Cute but (still) Psycho with three new tracks, second part of the EP Cute but Psycho that she previously released. In December 2019, Gavassi performed at Teatro Net São Paulo, an intimate acoustic show named Cute but Psycho Experience, where she focused on singing songs from her last two EPs.

=== 2020–present: Big Brother Brasil, debut in fashion & new single ===
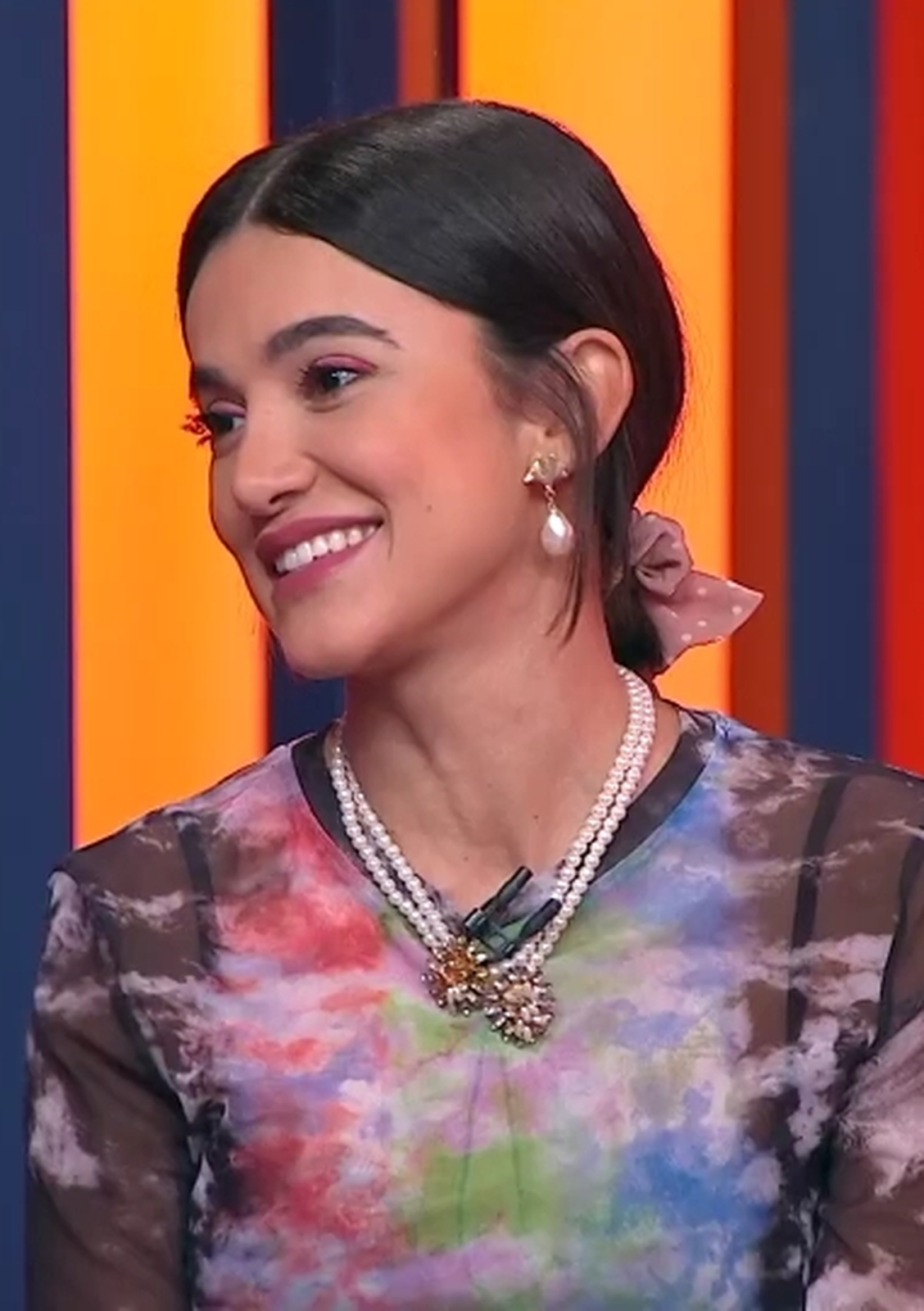
Gavassi in 2020

In 2020, she participated in the twentieth season of the reality show Big Brother Brasil, as one of the guests of the box group, taking 3rd place with 21.09% of the votes. Before joining the program, Manu recorded videos for her web series Garota Errada, which were published through her Instagram, portraying in a funny way her participation in BBB. Gavassi was highly praised for her marketing strategy to publicize her work, while confined to reality. In April, it was reported that the Globoplay streaming platform would be interested in producing the series, due to the great success it received. In interviews, Gavassi revealed that she will turn "Garota Errada" into a series and that there is a possibility for it to go to TV or streaming and have the direction of the actor Selton Mello and the participation of the actress Bruna Marquezine. On January 28, she released as a single the song "Audio of Excuses", a track that is part of the EP Cute but (still) Psycho, rereleased in September 2019. The music video for the song reached 1 million views in 24 hours, ranking first in the hot videos on YouTube Brazil. The song also topped Spotify's Top 50 viral, along with the songs "Planos Impossíveis", released in 2011, "Farsa", released in 2015 and "Música Secreta", released in 2019. "Áudio de Desculpas" was the singer's first song to score in the TOP 50 of the most played songs on Spotify Brasil, reaching 37th position. The song also reached 38th place in the TOP 50 of the world's viral songs.

Her participation in the reality show, made her book Olá, Caderno! released in 2017, sell out and gain an adaptation in the cinema. In February, Gavassi announced a mini tour named Cute but Psycho Experience. However, due to the COVID-19 pandemic, the tour was postponed to 2021. In April, Gavassi reached the 4th position and became the best positioned Brazilian artist on Billboard's Social 50 Chart. The singer also reached 30th position on Emerging Artists, on the Billboard charts, indicating who is currently on the rise. In May, she released the single "Eu Te Quero" in collaboration with singer Zeeba. The song reached 41st place in the TOP 50 of the most played songs on Spotify Brasil. On May 27, she launched her clothing and accessories collection in collaboration with C&A. In the same month, she re-recorded the "Pipoca e Guaraná" jingle for the Guaraná Antarctica advertising commercial. In June, Gavassi was invited to join the cast of the soap opera Salve-se Quem Puder, but she had to turn down the invitation, since she was already participating in the cast of the series Maldivas, scripted by the writer Natália Klein, the recordings are scheduled for September and will be shown on Netflix On August 21, Gavassi released the new single, "Deve Ser Horrível Dormir Sem Mim" with Gloria Groove.

== Personal life ==
In 2009, Gavassi was in a relationship with the actor and presenter Caíque Nogueira. After the relationship ended, the two remained best friends. In October 2011, after meeting the actor and singer Chay Suede during the band's first concert Rebeldes, where the singer performed the opening show, they began to date, only dating in November 2012. The relationship ended in June 2014, after three years together. From July to December of the same year, she was in a relationship with actor and singer Fiuk. Between January and July 2018, she had a relationship with businessman Leo Picon. In November 2019, she started a relationship with the engineer and executive director Igor Carvalho Rodrigues. In June 2020, the end of the relationship was confirmed.

In June 2021, she started dating model Jullio Reis. In May 2024, after three years of dating, Gavassi and Reis got engaged. In November 2024, they announced that they were expecting their first child. On April 4, 2025, the couple's first daughter was born.

== Discography ==
Studio albums

- Manu Gavassi (2010)
- Clichê Adolescente (2013)
- Manu (2017)
- Gracinha (2021)

EPs

- Vício (2015)
- Cute but Psycho (2018)
- MINIDocs Nashville (2019)
- Cute but (still) Psycho (2019)

List of singles as lead artist, with selected chart positions, showing year released and album name
Title	Year	Peak chart positions	Certifications	Album
Title	Year	BRA	Certifications	Album
"Garoto Errado"	2010	14	PMB: Gold	Manu Gavassi
"Planos Impossíveis"	2011	17	PMB: Gold	Manu Gavassi
"Odeio"	2011	22		Manu Gavassi
"Você Já Deveria Saber"	2012	—		Manu Gavassi
"Conto de Fadas"	2012	—		Clichê Adolescente
"Clichê Adolescente"	2013	26		Clichê Adolescente
"Segredo" (feat. Chay Suede)	2013	—		Clichê Adolescente
"Esse Amor Tão Errado"	2014	—		—N/a
"Camiseta"	2015	—		Vício
"Direção"	2016	90		Vício
"Vício"	2016	73		Vício
"Sozinha"	2016	—		Vício
"Hipnose"	2017	27		Manu
"Muito Muito"	2017	—		Manu
"Ninguém Vai Saber" (feat. Agir)	2018	—		Manu
"Áudio de Desculpas"	2019	37	Platinum	Cute but (still) Psycho
"Deve Ser Horrível Dormir Sem Mim" (with Gloria Groove)	2020	1		—N/a

== Tours ==
- Vício Tour (2015–16)
- Manu Tour (2017)
- Manu Pocket Tour (2018)
- Cute But Psycho Experience (2021)

== Filmography ==
Television
Year	Title	Role	Notes
2011	Julie e os Fantasmas	Débora	Episode: The First Clip
2014	Em Família	Paula Melo (Paulinha)	
2014–15	Malhação	Victória Nóbrega Oliveira (Vicki)	Season 22
2017	Planeta B	Josephine	Episode: Appearances Can Be Deceiving
2018	Z4	Pamela Toledo	
2020	Big Brother Brasil 20	Herself (Housemate)	Season 20
2020	MTV Millennial Awards Brazil	Herself (Presenter)	
2022	Maldivas	Milene Sampaio	
2023	It's All Right!	Manu	Episode: "Ainda Penso"
2025	BBB: O Documentário	Herself	Documentary

Films
Year	Title	Role	Notes
2013	NoCapricho: O Filme	Herself	Documentary
2019	Socorro, Virei Uma Garota!	Melina	
2021	Me Sinto Bem Com Você	Adriana	
2021	Gracinha	Gracinha/Maria	
2021	Olá, Caderno!		
2023	Não Tem Volta	Gabriela	
2025	Silvio Santos Vem Aí	Marília	

Voice over
Year	Title	Role	Notes
2012	Brave	Singing	Soundtrack
2013	Larry e os Sinistros	Victoria	
2014	Legends of Oz: Dorothy's Return	Dorothy	

Internet
Year	Title	Role	Notes
2010	Manu Gavassi - A Série	Herself	Webseries
2014	Clichê Adolescente	Herself	Mini Documentary
2016	Manu Gavassi: Vício	Herself	Webseries
2018;2020	Garota Errada	Herself	Webseries
2019	MINIdocs	Herself	Musical Documentary
2019	SóTocaTop	Presenter	Backstage
2020	Tik Toker	Lelê	Porta dos Fundos
2020	Concurso Real Oficial Toddy	Presenter	Contest
2021	O Cliente Tem Sempre Razão	Customer Service Center attendant	Netflix

== Books ==
Year	Title	Publishing company
2017	Olá, Caderno!	Rocco

== Awards and nominations ==
Brazilian Choice Awards

Year	Category	Recipient	Result
2015	Hottest Woman Of The Year	Herself	Won
2015	Best Snapchat	Herself	Nominated

Capricho Awards

Year	Category	Recipient	Result
2010	Best video clip of the year	Garoto Errado	Nominated
2010	Best National Album	Manu Gavassi	Nominated
2010	Best National Artist	Herself	Nominated
2011	Best National Artist	Herself	Nominated
2013	Best National Artist	Herself	Won
2014	Best National Artist	Herself	Won
2015	Best National Artist	Herself	Won
2020	National Artist	Herself	Nominated
2020	Featuring Of The Year	Manu Gavassi and Gloria Groove	Nominated
2020	Style Inspiration	Herself	Won
2020	Icon "It's BR"	Herself	Won
2020	Fandom Of The Year	Gavassiers	Nominated
2020	Best Friends	Bruna Marquezine and Manu Gavassi	Nominated
2020	Best Friends	Manu Gavassi and Rafa Kalimann	Nominated

Kids Choice Awards

Year	Category	Recipient	Result
2012	Best National Artist	Herself	Nominated
2013	Brazilian Favorite Voice	Herself	Nominated
2021	Brazilian Fandom	Gavassiers	Pending

Meus Prêmios Nick

Year	Category	Recipient	Result
2011	Best Singer	Herself	Nominated
2011	Favorite Song	Planos Impossíveis	Nominated
2011	Best New Artist	Herself	Won
2012	Favorite Singer	Herself	Won
2012	Favorite Song	Odeio	Nominated
2013	Favorite Singer	Herself	Nominated
2013	Song Of The Year	Clichê Adolescente	Nominated
2014	Favorite Singer	Herself	Won
2015	Hottest Female Artist	Herself	Nominated
2016	Favorite Singer	Herself	Nominated
2017	Favorite Singer	Herself	Nominated
2020	Favorite Musical Artist	Herself	Won
2020	Inspiration of the Year	Herself	Won
2020	Instagram of the Year	Herself	Won
2020	Style of the Year	Herself	Won
2020	Digital Content of the Year	"Garota Errada"	Won
2020	Favorite National Hit	"Áudio de Desculpas"	Won

MTV Millennial Awards Brazil

Year	Category	Recipient	Result
2018	Hi, girls	Herself	Nominated
2020	Icon Miaw	Herself	Won
2020	Clip of the year	Áudio de Desculpas	Won

Multishow Brazilian Music Award

Year	Category	Recipient	Result
2011	Best Artist of the Year	Herself	Nominated
2012	Best Singer	Her discography	Nominated
2012	Best Song	Odeio	Nominated
2016	Clip TVZ	Direção	Nominated

MVF Awards

Year	Category	Recipient	Result
2021	Best Narrative in National Music Video	Deve Ser Horrível Dormir Sem Mim	Nominated
2021	Best National Music Video	Deve Ser Horrível Dormir Sem Mim	Won

People's Choice Awards

Year	Category	Recipient	Result
2020	Influencer of the year Brazil	Herself	Won

Prêmio Contigo! de TV

Year	Category	Recipient	Result
2015	Best Supporting Actress	Malhação Sonhos	Nominated

Prêmio F5

Year	Category	Recipient	Result
2020	Influencer Of The Year	Herself	Won

Prêmio Febre Teen

Year	Category	Recipient	Result
2016	Best National Artist	Herself	Nominated
2016	Hottest Female Artist	Herself	Nominated
2016	Best National Actress	Malhação Sonhos	Nominated

Prêmio Influency.me

Year	Category	Recipient	Result
2018	Artist Of The Year	Herself	Nominated

Prêmio Jovem Brasileiro

Year	Category	Recipient	Result
2011	Best New Artist of the Year	Herself	Won
2012	Best Music Video	Odeio	Nominated
2012	Song of the Year	Odeio	Nominated
2012	Best Teen Singer	Odeio	Won
2013	Best Singer	Herself	Won
2015	Best Singer	Herself	Nominated
2015	Best Young on Twitter	Herself	Nominated
2015	Clip Of The Year	Esse Amor Tão Errado	Nominated
2016	Best Singer	Herself	Nominated
2017	Best Singer	Herself	Nominated
2020	Best Singer	Herself	Nominated
2020	Bombastic Clip	Áudio de Desculpas	Won

Prêmio LGBT + Som

Year	Category	Recipient	Result
2020	Best National Featuring or Group Song	Deve Ser Horrível Dormir Sem Mim	Nominated
2020	Best National Music Video	Deve Ser Horrível Dormir Sem Mim	Won

Prêmio MZOTV

Year	Category	Recipient	Result
2011	Best New Artist	Herself	Won
2012	Best National Artist	Herself	Nominated

Prêmio POPexpress

Year	Category	Recipient	Result
2021	Best Music Video	Deve Ser Horrível Dormir Sem Mim	Won

Prêmio POP Mais

Year	Category	Recipient	Result
2020	Song Of The Year	Áudios De Desculpas	Won
2020	Best Collaboration	Manu Gavassi and Gloria Groove	Won
2020	Best Pop Artist	Herself	Won
2020	Best Music Video	Deve Ser Horrível Dormir Sem Mim	Nominated

Prêmio POP Mundo News

Year	Category	Recipient	Result
2020	Live Of The Year	Vinho No Tapete	Nominated

Prêmio Portal Music BR

Year	Category	Recipient	Result
2020	Hit Of The Year	Deve Ser Horrível Dormir Sem Mim	Won

Prêmio Revista Veja

Year	Category	Recipient	Result
2011	Teen Star	Herself	Won

Prêmio TodaTeen

Year	Category	Recipient	Result
2020	Fashion Icon	Herself	Won
2020	Influencer Of The Year	Herself	Won
2020	Best Brazilian Singer	Herself	Nominated
2020	Live Of The Year	Vinho No Tapete	Won
2020	Featuring Of The Year	Manu Gavassi and Gloria Groove	Won
2020	Fandom Of The Year	Gavassiers	Won
2020	Friendship Of The Year	Bruna Marquezine and Manu Gavassi	Nominated
2020	Friendship Of The Year	Gizelly Bicalho and Manu Gavassi	Won
2020	Friendship Of The Year	Manu Gavassi and Rafa Kalimann	Nominated

Séries Em Cena Awards

Year	Category	Recipient	Result
2020	Best Reality Show Participant	Herself	Nominated

Splash Awards

Year	Category	Recipient	Result
2020	Best Music Video	Deve Ser Horrível Dormir Sem Mim	Won
2020	Best Reality Show Participant	Herself	Nominated

Troféu Internet

Year	Category	Recipient	Result
2013	Best Singer	Herself	Nominated
2014	Best Singer	Herself	Nominated
2015	Best Singer	Herself	Nominated
2021	Best Singer	Herself	Pending

WME Awards

Year	Category	Recipient	Result
2020	Best Music Mainstream	Deve Ser Horrível Dormir Sem Mim	Nominated
2020	Best Music Video	Deve Ser Horrível Dormir Sem Mim	Won

YOU POP Awards

Year	Category	Recipient	Result
2020	Best National Singer	Herself	Won
