= Heitor Dhalia =

Brazilian film director

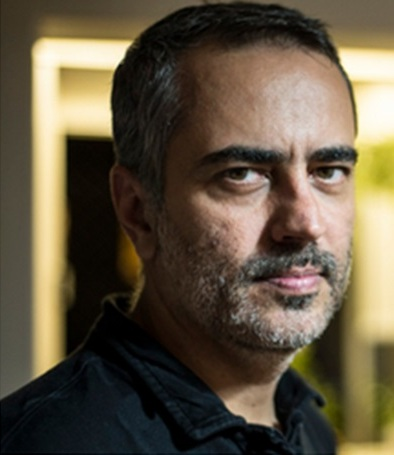
- Heitor Dhalia in 2014
- Born: 18 January 1970 (age 56); Recife, Pernambuco, Brazil
- Occupations: Film director Screenwriter
- Years active: 1988-present

Heitor Dhalia (born 18 January 1970) is a Brazilian film director and screenwriter. He has directed seven films since 1988. His film, À Deriva, competed in the Un Certain Regard section at the 2009 Cannes Film Festival.

== Filmography ==
- A Pantomima da Morte (1988)
- Conceição (2000)
- As Três Marias (2002; screenplay)
- Nina (2004)
- O Cheiro do Ralo (2006)
- À Deriva (2009)
- Gone (2012)
- Serra Pelada (2013)
- On Yoga: The Architecture of Peace (2017)
- Tungstênio (2018)
