= List of Brazilian films of 2011 =

In 2011, eight Brazilian films drew more than a million people to theaters. All of the 2011 Brazilian films together received an audience of nearly 19 million people. Brazil produced nearly 100 films in 2011, up from 30 in 2001 and less than five in 1994.

== Highest-grossing ==
These were the top ten Brazilian films in 2011. The films are ranked according to public.

Rank	Film	Public
1	De Pernas Pro Ar	3.547.138
2	Cilada.com	2.974.697
3	Bruna Surfistinha	2.159.203
4	Assalto ao Banco Central	1.920.193
5	Muita calma nessa hora	1.464.203
6	O Palhaço	1.406.262
7	Qualquer gato vira lata	1.178.099
8	O Homem do Futuro	1.199.752
9	VIPs	585.807
10	As mães de Chico Xavier	510.717

== 2011 releases ==
Title	Director	Cast	Genre	Notes
Os 3	Nando Olival	Juliana Schalch; Gabriel Godoy; Victor Mendes; Cecília Homem de Melo; Alceu Nunes	Comedy, drama	
O Abismo Prateado	Karim Ainouz	Alessandra Negrini; Otto Jr. Thiago Martins; Carla Ribas; Alice Borges	Drama	The film was shown in the Directors' Fortnight.
Amanhã Nunca Mais	Tadeu Jungle	Lázaro Ramos; Maria Luisa Mendonça; Fernanda Machado	Comedy	
Amor?	João Jardim	Júlia Lemmertz; Ângelo Antônio; Mariana Lima	Drama	
Area Q	Gerson Sanginitto	Isaiah Washington; Tania Khalill; Murilo Rosa	Sci-fi	Co-production with the US
Assalto ao Banco Central	Marcos Paulo Simões	Eriberto Leão; Hermila Guedes; Milhem Cortaz; Lima Duarte; Giulia Gam	Crime	Based on the 2005 Banco Central burglary at Fortaleza
Belair	Bruno Safadi; Noa Bressane	Rodrigo Lima; Noa Bressane; Bruno Safadi	Documentary	
Brasil Animado	Mariana Caltabiano		Animation	First Brazilian film in 3D
Bruna Surfistinha	Marcus Baldini	Deborah Secco; Gustavo Machado; Luciano Chirolli	Drama	Based on the 2005 drama book O Doce Veneno do Escorpião (en: The Scorpion's Sweet Poison) by Raquel Pacheco
As Canções	Eduardo Coutinho		Documentary	
Capitães da Areia	Cecília Amado; Guy Gonçalves	Jean Luis Souza de Amorim; Romário Santos de Assis; Israel Vinícius Gouvêa de Souza	Drama	Based on the Brazilian Modernist novel of the same name written by Jorge Amado
O Céu Sobre Os Ombros	Sérgio Borges	Everlyn Barbin; Lwei Bakongo; Murari Krishna	Drama	Winner of five awards at the 43rd Festival de Brasília
Cilada.com	José Alvarenga Jr.	Bruno Mazzeo; Fernanda Paes Leme; Dani Calabresa; Fernando Caruso; Fúlvio Stefanini	Comedy	Based on the Multishow sitcom
Craft	Gustavo Pizzi	Karine Teles	Drama	
Diário de uma Busca	Flávia Castro	Flávia Castro	Drama, documentary	
Elvis & Madona	Marcelo Laffitte	José Wilker; Fabianna Brazil; Duse Nacarati	Comedy	
Elza	Ernesto Baldan; Izabel Jaguaribe		Documentary	
Estamos Juntos	Toni Venturi	Cauã Reymond; Leandra Leal; Nazareno Casero	Drama	
Família Vende Tudo	Alain Fresnot	Luana Piovani; Caco Ciocler; Marisol Ribeiro; Lima Duarte	Comedy	
Histórias que Só Existem Quando Lembradas	Júlia Murat			
O Homem do Futuro	Cláudio Torres	Alinne Moraes; Wagner Moura	Comedy, science fiction	
As Mães de Chico Xavier	Glauber Filho		Drama	Based on the book Por Trás do Véu de Isis written by Marcel Souto Maior
Malu de Bicicleta	Flávio R. Tambellini	Fábio Lago; Daniele Suzuki; Maria Manuela	Comedy	
Mamonas Pra Sempre	Claudio Kahns		Documentary	Documentary about Brazilian band Mamonas Assassinas
Meu País	Andre Ristum	Cauã Reymond; Débora Falabella; Rodrigo Santoro	Drama	
Nana Caymmi em Rio Sonata	Georges Gachot	Milton Nascimento; Tom Jobim; Gilberto Gil; Dori Caymmi; Erasmo Carlos; Maria Bethânia	Documentary	
Não Se Pode Viver Sem Amor	Jorge Durán	Cauã Reymond; Fabiula Nascimento; Babu Santana	Drama	
Não Se Preocupe, Nada Vai Dar Certo	Hugo Carvana	Ângela Vieira; Tarcísio Meira; Gregório Duvivier; Flávia Alessandra	Comedy	
O Mineiro e o Queijo	Helvecio Ratton		Documentary	
Os Monstros	Guto Parente; Luiz Pretti; Pedro Diógenes; Ricardo Pretti	Luiz Pretti; Ana Luiza Rios; Aline Silva	Fiction	
O Palhaço	Selton Mello	Selton Mello; Paulo José; Larissa Manoela; Giselle Motta; Teuda Bara; Moacyr Franco; Danton Mello	Comedy	
Onde Está a Felicidade?	Carlos Alberto Riccelli	Bruna Lombardi; Marcelo Adnet; Bruno Garcia; Dani Calabresa	Comedy	Co-production with Spain
Qualquer Gato Vira-Lata	Daniela de Carlo; Tomas Portella	Cléo Pires; Malvino Salvador; Dudu Azevedo	Comedy	
Quebradeiras	Evaldo Mocarzel		Documentary	The film won the award for Best Documentary at the 22nd Rencontres de Cinémas d’Amérique Latine de Toulouse, France.
Quebrando o Tabu	Fernando Grostein Andrade	Paulo Coelho; Dráuzio Varella; Jimmy Carter; Bill Clinton; Fernando Henrique Cardoso	Documentary	
Rewind Life	Luiz Saneti	Stela Marianno, Adriano Baluz, Marina Vásques, Emanuel Risaint	Mystery, supernatural	
Rock Brasília – Era de Ouro	Vladimir Carvalho		Documentary	
The Sky We Were Born Under	Marcos Jorge; Fernando Severo	Carlos Eduardo de Magalhães; Marcos Jorge; Fernando Severo; Mario Lopes	Drama	
Soulbound	Caio Sóh	Emilio Dantas, Remo Rocha, Paloma Duarte	Drama	
Trabalhar Cansa	Juliana Rojas; Marco Dutra	Helena Albergaria; Marat Descartes; Carlos Escher	Drama	The film competed in the 'Un Certain Regard' section of the Cannes Film Festival.
Transeunte	Eryk Rocha	Fernando Bezerra; Luciana Domschke	Drama	
Uma Professora Muito Maluquinha	André Alves Pinto; César Rodrigues	Kadu Baptista; Elisa Pinheiro; Neusa Rocha; Ziraldo; João Vieira	Comedy	Based on the book written by Ziraldo
VIPs	Toniko Melo	Wagner Moura; Jorge D'Elía; Gisele Fróes; Amaury Jr; Roger Gobeth	Drama	Based on the book written by Mariana Caltabiano

== See also ==
- 2011 in Brazil
- 2011 in Brazilian television
