= VIP (disambiguation) =

VIP, or very important person, is a person with privileges due to their status.

VIP or vip may also refer to:

== Arts and entertainment ==
- V.I.P. (comedian), an Indian television comedian
- VIP (magazine), an Irish celebrity lifestyle fashion magazine
- VIP, a video brand formerly used by Japanese adult video company Atlas21
- V.I.P. (talk show), a 1973–1983 Canadian television talk show
- V.I.P. (American TV series), a 1998–2002 American television series starring Pamela Anderson
- Very Important People (2012 TV series), a British television sketch show
- VIP (South Korean TV series), a 2019 South Korean television series
- Very Important People (2023 TV series), an American improvisational comedy web show
- VIP Magazin, a Moldovan celebrity lifestyle magazine
- VIPs (Squid Game), antagonists in the South Korean television series Squid Game

=== Films ===
- Very Important Person (film), a 1961 British film
- The V.I.P.s (film), a 1963 film
- VIP my Brother Superman, a 1968 Italian animation film
- V.I.P. (1991 film), a Polish film by Juliusz Machulski
- V. I. P. (1997 film), an Indian Tamil film
- VIPs (film), a 2010 Brazilian film
- Velaiilla Pattadhari, a 2014 film also known as VIP
- V.I.P. (2017 film), a South Korean film

=== Music ===
- V.I.P. (Hungarian band), a defunct pop boy group
- The V.I.P.'s (band), an English band of the 1960s
- Voices in Public, a Canadian boy group
- VVIP (hip-hop group), a Ghanaian hiplife band, formerly known as VIP (or Vision In Progress)
- V.I.P. (album), a 2000 album by Jungle Brothers, or the title track
- "V.I.P." (Bro'Sis song) (2003)
- "V.I.P" (Ice Prince song) (2013)
- "V.I.P" (Sid song) (2013)
- "VIP" (Aya Nakamura song) (2022)
- V.I.P., a subsidiary label of Motown Records
- VIP Music Records, an American record label based in New York City (founded 2004)
- VIP Records, a record store chain from Los Angeles, California (founded 1967)
- "VIP", a song by Kesha from Animal (Kesha album)
- The V.I.P. (The Vanilla Ice Posse), the rapper's DJs and backup dancers
- Victory in Praise Music and Arts Seminar Mass Choir, an organization founded by John P. Kee
- "V.I.P.", a song by Françoise Hardy
- "V.I.P.", a song by R. Kelly from R. (R. Kelly album)
- V.V.I.P, a 2011 EP by Seungri
- V.I.P. – Very Important Pony, 2025 EP by HorsegiirL

== Science ==
- Vasoactive intestinal peptide, a peptide hormone
- Ventral intraparietal sulcus, in the lateral parietal lobe of the human brain

== Telecommunications and Internet telephony ==
- Virtual IP address, an IP address that does not correspond to a single physical network interface
- Vip mobile, a Serbian mobile network operator

== Other uses ==
- VIP style, or VIP Car, a car modification trend
- Plymouth VIP, a luxury version of the Plymouth Fury (1966-1969)
- Vacuum insulated panel, a form of thermal insulation consisting of a nearly gas-tight enclosure surrounding a rigid core, from which the air has been evacuated
- Variable Information Printing, a form of on-demand printing
- VimpelCom, a stock symbol
- VIP Ecuador, an Ecuadorian airline
- VIP Industries, a luggage manufacturer based in India
- VIP's (restaurant), an American restaurant chain
- Virgil Partch, a cartoonist who signed his work Vip
- Virgin Islands Party, a political party in the British Virgin Islands
- Virology Science and Technology Institute of the Philippines, also known as the Virology Institute of the Philippines (VIP)
- Vision Inspired by the People, a political party in Belize
- Visually impaired person, a person with a decreased ability to see

== See also ==
- Veep (disambiguation)
- VIPS (disambiguation)
