= VIPS =

VIPS or Vips may stand for:

- Vivekananda Institute of Professional Studies, a college in Delhi, India
- VIPS (software) image processing software
- Veteran Intelligence Professionals for Sanity, a group of current and former officials of the United States Intelligence Community
- Volunteers in Police Service, a volunteer program that provides volunteer assistance to local police
- VIPs (film), a 2010 Brazilian film
- "VIPs", an episode of Squid Game
- VIP's (American restaurant), a former restaurant chain based in Salem, Oregon, U.S.
- VIPS (South Korean restaurant), a restaurant chain based in South Korea
- Vips (Mexican restaurant), a restaurant chain owned by Alsea, previously owned by Walmart de México, also found in Spain
- Jüri Vips (born 2000), Estonian racing driver
- Marcelo VIPs (1976–2025), Brazilian businessman, consultant and speaker
- The V.I.P.s, a 1963 British film

== See also ==
- VIP (disambiguation)
