= VIP Records (disambiguation) =

VIP Records may refer to:

- V.I.P. Records (1964–1974), a U.S. record label, a division of Motown, based in Detroit
- VIP Records (est. 1967), a record store chain from South Central Los Angeles, California
- VIP Music Records (est. 2004), a U.S. record label, based in New York City

== See also ==
- V.I.P. (album), a 2000 album by Jungle Brothers
- VIP (disambiguation)
