= The Middle of the World (2003 film) =

2003 film directed by Vicente Amorim

- Theatrical release poster
- Directed by: Vicente Amorim
- Written by: David França Mendes
- Produced by: Bruno Barreto; Ângelo Gastal
- Starring: Wagner Moura; Cláudia Abreu; Sidney Magal; Ravi Lacerda; Carol Castro
- Production companies: Luiz Carlos Barreto Produções Cinematográficas; Filmes do Equador; Miravista; Globo Filmes (co-production); MegaColor; Riofilme; Quanta Centro de Produções Cinematográficas; Lereby Productions; Sundance Institute Brazil Screenwriters Lab
- Distributed by: Buena Vista International
- Release date: September 12, 2003
- Running time: 85 minutes
- Country: Brazil
- Language: Portuguese
- Budget: RS3 million
- Box office: US$394,290

The Middle of the World (Portuguese: O Caminho das Nuvens; lit. The Path of the Clouds) is a 2003 Brazilian drama film starring Wagner Moura and Cláudia Abreu as a couple with five children making a 3,200 kilometres (2,000 mi) bicycle trip from the state of Paraíba to the city of Rio de Janeiro. It is based on the true story of Cícero Ferreira Dias, a former truck driver who took his family from Paráiba to Rio de Janeiro in search of a "R$1,000 job". The English title is a reference to the starting point of the film, the "Praça do Meio do Mundo" (Middle of the World Square in Portuguese).

The film holds a 58% rating at Rotten Tomatoes and a 32 score at Metacritic, indicating "generally unfavorable reviews".

== Plot ==
Romão (Wagner Moura) and Rose (Cláudia Abreu) are a poor couple living in Paraíba and in search of a job that pays R$1,000 a month, the sum Romão believes to be the minimum necessary for him to feed his children. They decide to make a trip by bicycle to Rio de Janeiro with their five children: teenager Antônio (Ravi Ramos Lacerda); children Rodney (Manoel Sebastião Alves Filho), Clévis (Felipe Newton Silva Rodrigues) and Suelena (Cícera Cristina Almino de Lima); and newborn Cícero (Cícero Wesley A. Ferreira).

Along the way, they make some money washing cars and performing Roberto Carlos songs. They also give a chance to some promising opportunities, but all of them fail. They are first offered a job by a criminal, who warns them that he can only give work for "sons of a bitches". They are later promised jobs by Severino, a councilman of São Bento, but since it takes too long for him to fulfill it, they decide to leave.

Later, they pray by the Statue of Father Cícero in Juazeiro do Norte, where Romão hears an announcement about the "table of Padre Cícero", one that will grant a blessing for the one who manages to lift it. Romão gives it a try, lifts it, but faints just afterwards. Later, they meet a lone traveler called Gideão (Cláudio Jaborandy), who tells them to go to Filadélfia and search for Neguiça (Fábio Lago). That night, Antônio and Clévis find a church nearby and accidentally smash a cash box full of money. Antônio gives in to temptation and takes all the bills. In Filadélfia, the family meets Neguiça, who offers them shelter, but says he has no jobs. Antônio tries to go to the local night party, but flees as soon as he gets there, unable to feel comfortable.

In Feira de Santana, Antônio goes to the local bus terminus and buys tickets to Rio de Janeiro for everyone. When his parents ask where he got the money, Antônio admits it was taken from the church and Romão tears all the tickets apart. Later, the family stumble upon Panamá (Sidney Magal) and Callado (Franciolli Luciano), a pair looking for men, women and children from all ages for a "great opportunity", with no skills required. Romão reluctantly agrees and convinces Panamá to allow him to take the bikes with them on the truck that'll take them to the opportunity, as well as three members of the family that weren't selected for the job.

The opportunity turns out to be a fake Pataxó quarup ritual in a club in Porto Seguro, where Romão and three of his children are dressed as supposedly legit Pataxó and Panamá poses as a foreign entertainer, owner of a park called Caminho das Nuvens (the original title of the film; could be translated as "Path of the Clouds"). Antônio sneaks in the club and when Romão sees him, he leaves the place mid-ritual, and so do his children. Frustrated, he orders Rose never to arrange them such jobs anymore.

Still in Porto Seguro, Antônio meets Sereia (Carol Castro), who is giving out some Caminho das Nuvens flyers. Soon after, he meets Neguiça and Gideão again, and they take him to a local party, where he meets Sereia one more time and takes an instant picture with her. The morning after, Rose reprehends him for disappearing without any warning and he announces he will stay in Porto Seguro. Romão accepts and leaves with the rest of the family. That night, he searches for Sereia, but she is hooking up with Panamá. Antônio spills some beverage on Panamá's face, and Sereia responds by pushing him to the ground. Later, he meets his family again by case.

Upon arriving in the state of Rio de Janeiro, Romão arranges Antônio a job as a bricklayer in a city far from Rio de Janeiro. He agrees to stay and says the real last goodbye to his family. As Romão and his family arrive in Rio de Janeiro, they visit the Christ the Redeemer and Romão asks a man for directions to Brasília. Rose listens to it and says she is definitely not going back to the road.

== Cast ==
- Cláudia Abreu as Rose
- Wagner Moura as Romão
- Ravi Ramos Lacerda as Antônio
- Sidney Magal as Panamá
- Cláudio Jaborandy as Gideão / Chupa Cabra
- Franciolli Luciano as Callado
- Manoel Sebastião Alves Filho as Rodney
- Felipe Newton Silva Rodrigues as Clévis
- Cícera Cristina Almino de Lima as Suelena
- Cícero Wallyson A. Ferreira as Cícero
- Cícero Wesley A. Ferreira as Cícero
- Carol Castro as Sereia
- Caco Monteiro as Severino
- Laís Corrêa as Jurema
- Fábio Lago as Neguiça
- Lúcio Leonn as Criminal
