= Filadélfia, Bahia =

Municipality of Bahia, Brazil

Coordinates: 10°44′27″S 40°07′58″W

Filadélfia
- Municipality
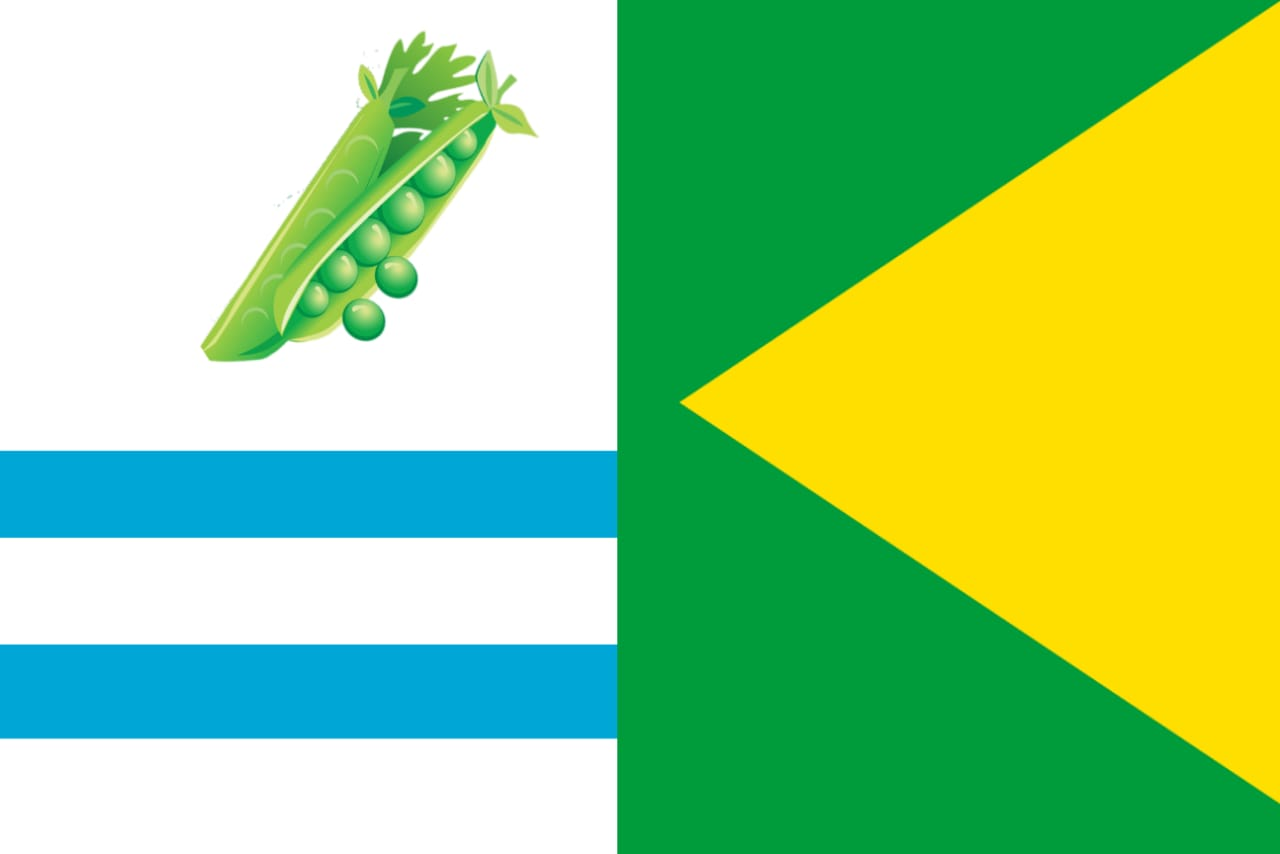
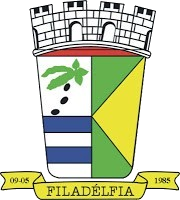
- Flag Coat of arms
- Interactive map of Filadélfia
- Country: Brazil
- Region: Nordeste
- State: Bahia

Population (2020)
  - Total: 16,345
- Time zone: UTC−3 (BRT)

Filadélfia is a municipality in the state of Bahia in the North-East region of Brazil. It has a population of 16,345 as of 2020. It was raised to municipality status in 1985, the area being taken out of the municipality of Pindobaçu.

== See also ==
- List of municipalities in Bahia
