= They Killed Sister Dorothy =

2008 film directed by Daniel Junge

- Directed by: Daniel Junge
- Produced by: Henry Ansbacher; Nigel Noble; Marcela Bourseau; Gustavo Gelmini
- Starring: Martin Sheen (narrator); David Stang; Becky Spires; Dorothy Stang (footage)
- Cinematography: Marcela Bourseau
- Edited by: Davis Coombe
- Music by: baban escobar
- Distributed by: Home Box Office
- Release date: March 9, 2008 (SXSW)
- Running time: 94 minutes
- Country: United States
- Languages: English; Portuguese

They Killed Sister Dorothy is a 2008 American documentary film directed by Daniel Junge about Dorothy Stang, an American-born Brazilian nun who was murdered on February 12, 2005, in Anapu, a city located in the Amazon rainforest.

The film is narrated by Martin Sheen in the English version and by Wagner Moura in the Portuguese version.

== Synopsis ==
The film examines the motives for the murder of Dayton, Ohio native Dorothy Mae Stang, a 73-year-old nun of the Sisters of Notre Dame de Namur order who fought for the preservation of the Amazon Rainforest in the Brazilian state of Pará. It also follows the trial of those convicted for murdering Stang.

== Release and awards ==
The film received the Audience Award and the Competition Award at the 2008 South by Southwest Festival, where it had its worldwide premiere. In Brazil, where the film title received a literal translation, it premiered at the 2007 Rio de Janeiro Film Festival. It was also screened at the 32nd São Paulo International Film Festival. It is planned to receive a nationwide release on February 13, 2009.

The film and its song "Forever", written and performed by Bebel Gilberto, daughter of Bossa Nova pioneer João Gilberto, were pre-selected for the Academy Awards for Best Documentary Feature and Best Original Song, respectively.
