= Sidney Magal =

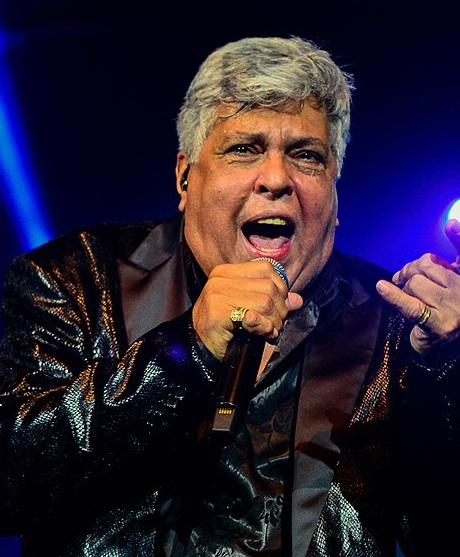
- Sidney Magal in a concert at Tom Brasil in November 2018
- Born: Sidney Magalhães; 19 June 1950 (age 76); Rio de Janeiro, Federal District, Brazil
- Occupations: Singer, songwriter, actor, dancer
- Spouses: Solange Couto (m. 1974; div. 1980) Magali West (m. 1982)
- Relatives: Vinny Magalhães (half-brother)
- Musical career
- Genres: Brega; disco; salsa; lambada; latin pop; MPB
- Instrument: Vocals
- Years active: 1967–present
- Label: Polydor Records
- Website: www.sidneymagal.com.br

Sidney Magalhães, better known as Sidney Magal (born 19 June 1950 in Rio de Janeiro), is a Brazilian singer, dancer and actor.

Sidney Magal is portrayed by Filipe Bragança in the Brazilian biographical film Meu sangue ferve por você, directed by Paulo Machline.

== Discography ==
Studio albums

- 1977: Sidney Magal
- 1978: Magal
- 1979: O Amante
- 1980: O Amor Não Tem Hora para Chegar
- 1981: Quero Te Fazer Feliz
- 1982: Magal Espetacular
- 1983: Vibrações
- 1984: Cara
- 1985: Me Acende
- 1987: Mãos Dadas
- 1990: Magal
- 1991: Só Satisfação
- 1995: Sidney Magal & Big Band
- 1998: Aventureiro
- 2000: Baila Magal
- 2006: Sidney Magal ao Vivo [CD/DVD]

== Filmography ==
=== Films ===
Year	Title	Role	Notes
1974	O Sexo das Bonecas		
1979	Amante Latino	Himself	
1991	Inspetor Faustão e o Mallandro	Himself	
2003	The Middle of the World	Panamá	
2005	Um Lobisomem na Amazônia	Inca Sorcerer	
2006	Happy Feet	Lovelace	Brazilian Dub
2009	Jean Charles	Himself	
2011	Happy Feet Two	Lovelace	Brazilian Dub
2013	Despicable Me 2	Eduardo "El Macho" Pérez	Brazilian Dub
2015	Inside Out	Brazilian Helicopter Pilot	Brazilian Dub

=== Television ===
Year	Title	Role	Notes
1990	A História de Ana Raio e Zé Trovão		
1996	O Campeão	Ismael	
2004	Celebridade	Himself	
2004	A Diarista		Episode: "O Spa"
2004	Da Cor do Pecado	Comandante Frazão	
2005	Bang Bang	Zorro (Cleiton)	
2007	Toma Lá, Dá Cá	Esteban	Episode: Boa Noite, Seu Ladir
2008	Faça Sua História	Passenger	Episode: "A Vingadora Capixaba"
2008–09	Uma Escolinha Muito Louca	Himself	
2013	Balacobaco	Himself	
2013	Got Talent	Himself (Judge)	
2021	The Masked Singer Brasil	Dogão (Contestant)	12th Place

== Personal life ==
In January 2024, during Roda Viva, he came out as bisexual.

He is the older half-brother of mixed martial artist and former UFC fighter Vinny Magalhães.
