= Carol Castro =

Brazilian actress (born 1982)

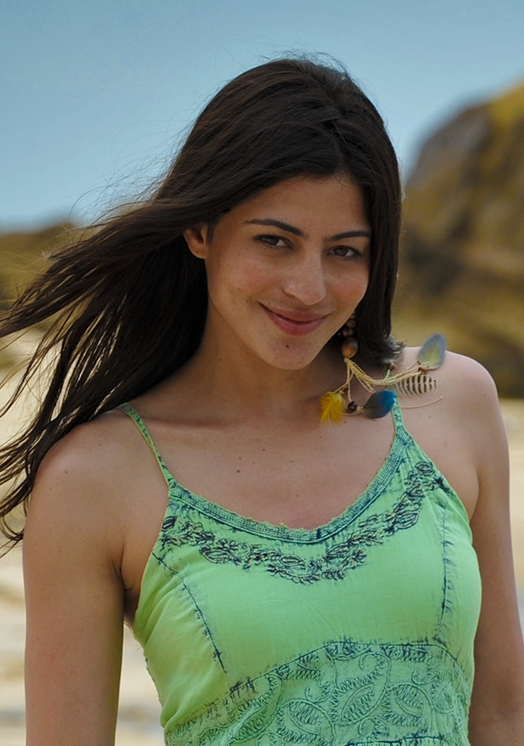
- Born: Carolina Osório de Castro; 10 March 1984 (age 42); Rio de Janeiro, Brazil
- Occupations: actress, producer

Carolina "Carol" Osório de Castro (born 10 March 1984) is a Brazilian actress and producer. In 2019, she won the Best Supporting Actress award at the Gramado Film Festival for her role as Madalena in the film Veneza.

== Early life ==
Born in the city of Rio de Janeiro, she is the daughter of actor and theater director Lucca de Castro and body therapist Maria Cecília Castello Branco. When she was five years old, her parents separated. She moved to Natal with her mother and sister, where she lived for four years with her maternal grandparents. During this time, she began practicing sports such as bodyboarding, soccer, and surfing, in addition to taking ballet, jazz dancing, and gymnastics classes. At the age of nine, she returned to Rio de Janeiro and lived with her father for a year. She lived for two years in the city of Bauru with her mother and sister, later returning to Rio.

== Career ==
Encouraged by her father, Castro joined the theater and made her stage debut alongside him in the project Terror na Praia (Terror on the Beach). At the time, her father led a children's theater group, and she became a part of it.The group satirized classic horror films such as Bram Stoker's Dracula and Mary Shelley's Frankenstein. In 1994, she wrote her first play, Socorro, and was responsible for casting and directing the piece. In 2000, she retired from the stage and moved to Bauru, São Paulo, to live in a shared apartment with her sister and three friends. Two years later, she returned to the theater and signed on to produce Terror em Copacabana, a reinterpretation of the play Terror na Praia. During one of the performances, she caught the attention of a TV Globo producer, Luiz Antônio Rocha, who took her to meet the telenovela director Ricardo Waddington. Waddington liked Castro's acting and invited her to work in Mulheres Apaixonadas.

In the same year, she did a photoshoot for VIP magazine. In 2003, she made her film debut playing a mermaid in The Middle of the World. Following that, she appeared in the film Um Show de Verão alongside television presenter Angélica and starred in the Argentinian film Peligrosa obsesión.

== Filmography ==
=== Television ===
Year	Títle	Role	Notes
2003	Mulheres Apaixonadas	Maria da Graça Pereira (Gracinha)	
2004	Senhora do Destino	Angélica Ramos Ferreira da Silva	
2005	Bang Bang	Mercedita Bolívar	
2006	O Profeta	Ruth Ribeiro de Sousa	
2006	Os Caras de Pau	Various characters	Episode: "10 de dezembro"
2007	Circo do Faustão	Contestant	Season 1
2007	Os Amadores	Marta	Episode: "21 de dezembro"
2008	Beleza Pura	Sheila Cabral Rocha	
2009	Superbonita	Special presenter	Episode: "11 de setembro"
2009	Chico e Amigos	Patrícia	Year end special
2010	Escrito nas Estrelas	Mariana Ribeiro	
2011	Morde & Assopra	Natália de Sousa	
2012	Amor Eterno Amor	Jacira da Silva	
2013	Dança dos Famosos	Contestant	Temporada 10
2013	Amor à Vida	Sílvia Bueno Donato	
2014	A Mulher da Sua Vida	Adriana	Episode: "17 de agosto"
2014	Vai que Cola	Marisa	Episode
2016	Velho Chico	Iolanda de Sá Ribeiro (jovem)	EpisodeS: "14 de março–8 de abril"
2018	O Som e o Tempo	Etelvina	Episódio: "Baba de Quiabo"
2018	Carcereiros	Valéria	Episode: "Uma Questão Pessoal"
2018	O Tempo Não Para	Comandante Waleska Tibério Souto (Wal)	
2019	Órfãos da Terra	Helena Torquato	
2021	Insânia	Paula Costa	
2022	Maldivas	Katiuscia Miller (Kat)	
2023	Amor Perfeito	Darlene Nogueira	
2024	Desejos S.A.	Flávia Lima	
2024	Garota do Momento	Clarice de Souza Dourado	
2025	Batalha do Lip Sync	Contestant (winner)	Season 4; Episode: 5
2025	Jogo Cruzado	Elisa Montes	

=== Film ===
Year	Títle	Character	Notes
2003	O Caminho das Nuvens	Sereia	
2004	Perigosa Obsessão	Mariana	
2004	Um Show de Verão	Salete Keli	
2004	Consciente Irracional	Ritinha	Short film
2011	Cilada.com	Mônica	
2012	Open Road	Sônia	
2013	O Concurso	Mariana	
2015	A Morte & Vida de Ana Belshoff	Ana Belshoff	Short film
2016	Um Suburbano Sortudo	Sofie / Sofia	
2018	E.A.S.: Esquadrão Antissequestro	Rosa	
2018	Baba de Quiabo (ou Em Casa de Malandro, Vagabundo Não Pede Emprego)	Etelvina	Short film
2019	O Juízo	Tereza	
2021	Veneza	Madalena	
2021	Dois Mais Dois	Emília	
2022	Eike - Tudo ou Nada	Luma de Oliveira	
2023	Ninguém é de Ninguém	Gabriela	
2023	Stand Up – Minha Vida É uma Piada	Laura Santos	
2024	Férias Trocadas	Renata Aguiar	
2024	Passagrana	Carol Castro	
2024	Ainda Somos os Mesmos	Clara	
2026	Nosso Lar 3	Zenóbia	
2026	Pacto Maldito		
TBA	Um casal quase perfeito	"Agente Sedução"	
TBA	Uma Babá Gloriosa	Lethicia Leme	
TBA	Mercado dos Ratos	Léa	
TBA	O Garoto	Daniele	
TBA	Verde Ou Pisa No Meu Pé	Bia	
	Voz de Prisão		

=== Internet ===
Year	Títle	Character	Notes
2016	A Lenda do Mão de Luva	Selena	Webseries
2016	A Violinista	Estudante de Violino	Webseries
2026	Quem É o Pai do Meu Bebê?	Suzy	Vertical series

=== Music videos ===
Year	Song	Artist
2014	"O Tempo Não Apaga"	Victor & Leo

== Stage ==
Year	Títle	Character	Notes
1993	Terror na Praia - Frankestein	Maria	
1994	Nosferatu	Vampirinha	
1994	Socorro		Also writer and director
2000	O Incrível Encontro	Índia	
2002	Terror em Copacabana		Actress and producer
2008	Dona Flor e Seus Dois Maridos	Florípedes (Dona Flor)	
2013	Paixão de Cristo de Nova Jerusalém	Madalena	
2014	Paixão de Cristo de Nova Jerusalém	Maria de Nazaré	
2015	Nine – Um Musical Felliniano	Luisa Contini	
2016	Cartas Leopoldinas	Maria Leopoldina de Áustria	
2025	A Manhã Seguinte	Kátia	

== Awards and nominations ==
Year	Award	Category	Nomination	Result
2003	Troféu UOL TV e Famosos	Best Breakthrough Actress	Mulheres Apaixonadas	Won
2007	Prêmio Contigo! de TV	Best Actress	O Profeta	Nominated
2008	Prêmio Qualidade Brasil	Best Stage Actress- Comedy	Dona Flor e Seus Dois Maridos	Nominated
2009	Prêmio Contigo! de TV	Best Supporting Actress	Beleza Pura	Nominated
2013	Prêmio Cenym de Teatro	Best Supporting Actress	Paixão de Cristo, Nova Jerusalém	Nominated
2019	Festival de Cinema de Gramado	Best Supporting Actress	Veneza	Won
2019	Los Angeles Brazilian Film Festival	Best Supporting Actress	Veneza	Won
2022	Grande Prêmio do Cinema Brasileiro	Best Supporting Actress	Veneza	Nominated
2022	Festival Sesc Melhores Filmes	Best Brazilian Actress	Veneza	Nominated
2022	Festival Sesc Melhores Filmes	Best Brazilian Actress	Dois Mais Dois	Nominated
2022	SEC Awards	Best Actress in a Brazilian Series	Insânia	Won
2024	Festival Sesc Melhores Filmes	Best Brazilian Actress	Ninguém é de Ninguém	Nominated
2024	Prêmio F5	Best Supporting Acting	Garota do Momento	Won
2025	Prêmio iBest	Influencing Protagonist	Garota do Momento	Nominated
2025	SEC Awards	Best telenovela Actress	Garota do Momento	Won
2025	Prêmio Referência Nacional	Medalha Nelson Rodrigues	Garota do Momento	Won
2025	Prêmio Noticiasdetv	Best Supporting Actress	Garota do Momento	Won
2025	Melhores do Ano NaTelinha	Best Actress	Garota do Momento	Won
2025	Prêmio Área VIP	Best Actress	Garota do Momento	Won
2025	Melhores do Ano Canal do Vannucci	Telenovela Actress	Garota do Momento	Nominated
2025	Melhores do Ano Canal do Vannucci	Momento Mais Marcante	Garota do Momento	Won
2025	Prêmio Contigo!	Best Actress	Garota do Momento	Won
2025	Melhores do Ano – Duh Secco	Best Actress	Garota do Momento	Nominated
2025	Melhores do Ano de Mais Novela	Best telenovela Actress	Garota do Momento	Pending
2025	Prêmio APCA de Televisão	Best Actress	Garota do Momento	Nominated
