= Fabrizio Moreira =

Ecuadorian politician and businessman

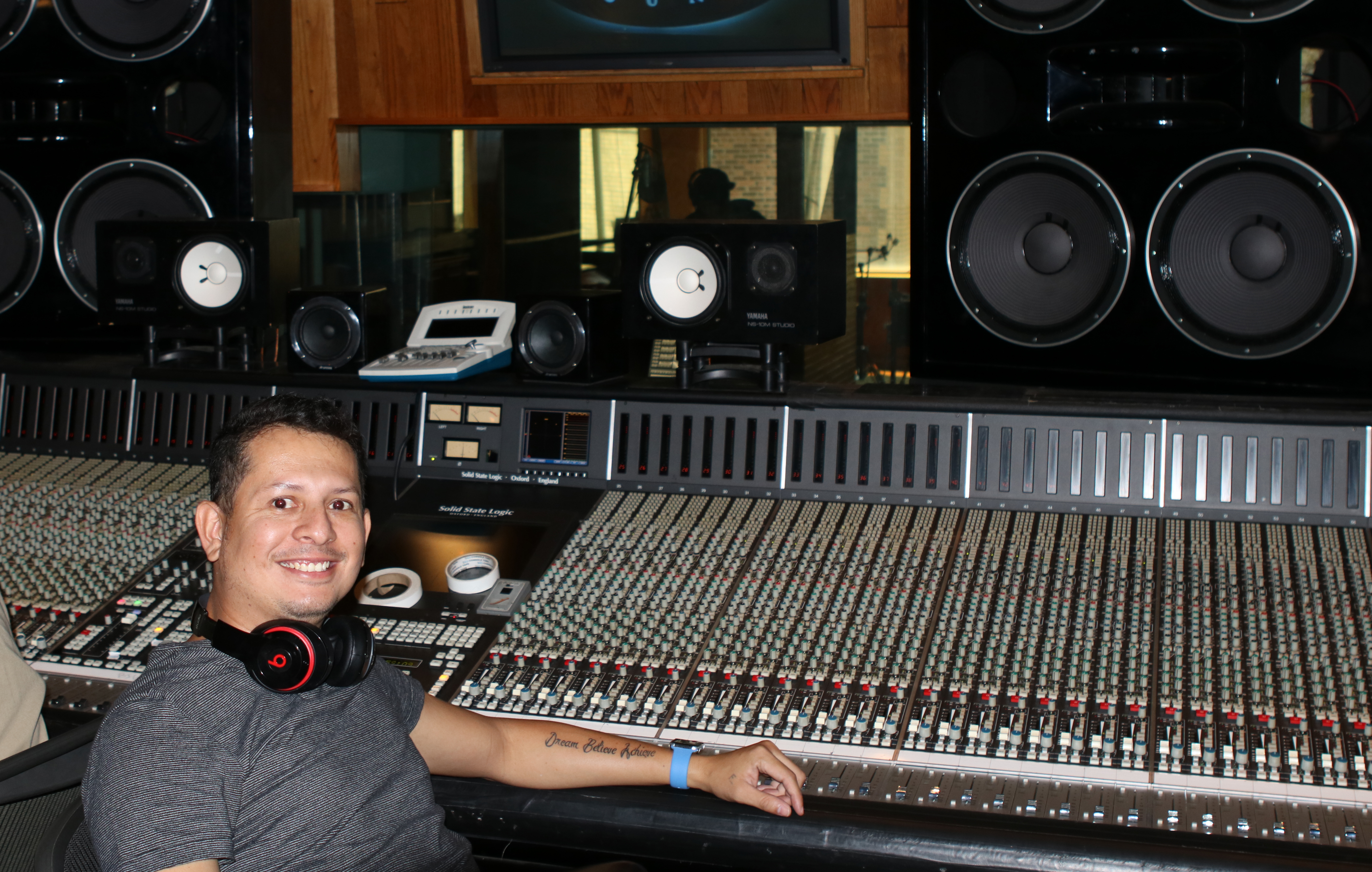

Personal details
- Born: Fabrizio Moreira; January 18, 1982 (age 44) Manta, Manabi, Ecuador
- Party: Social Christian Party
- Spouse: Maryna Krupin
- Children: Nikolas Moreira, Nikita Krupin
- Education: Universidad Laica Eloy Alfaro de Manabi
- Occupation: Talent Agent
- Profession: Businessman
- Known for: Entrepreneurship, social media, angel investing, Music, Songwriting, Production, Politics
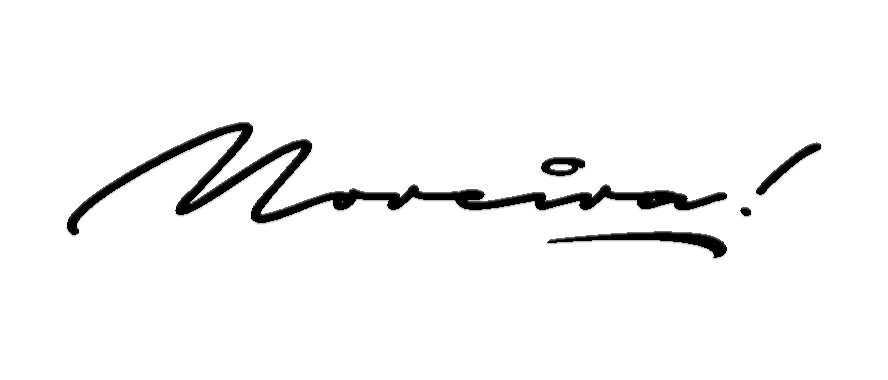
- Signature
- Website: Fabrizio Moreira

Fabrizio Moreira (born January 18, 1982, in Manta, Manabi, Ecuador) is an Ecuadorian politician and businessman. He currently resides in the United States after he fled as a political dissident against the former government of Rafael Correa in Ecuador. He is owner of the record label VIP Music Records, best known for managing the bookings of the rapper Soulja Boy from 2013 to 2014. He is also a dual LARAS / NARAS Grammy voting member and international speaker.

== Career ==
Moreira is a former member of the Network of Young Leaders of the Inter-American Development Bank, which has participated in complaints and investigations against drug trafficking and contract killings for the periodical El Universo in Ecuador. He promoted freedom of speech, free trade, and training activities in Ecuador with the participation of the Friedrich Naumann Foundation. He has also served as national representative of the nongovernmental organization CIT Ecuador (Fundación Coordinadora por la Inversión y el Trabajo).

He is a former candidate and a councilor for the Social Christian Party in Manta.

Moreira used his experience in advertising, public relations and promotional services to assist in the political campaigns of several like minded politicians, including Edgar Jara (candidate for president of Ecuador), Otto Pérez Molina (former constitutional president of Guatemala), and Susana Gonzalez (former leader in the Ecuadorian senate) through social media marketing.

=== The Moreira Organization ===
Fabrizio is the chairman of The Moreira Organization LLC, a communications and creative media agency. in 2017 the company was awarded by Inc Magazine as one of the Most Fasted Growing private companies in the United States.

=== VIP Music Records ===
Moreira founded the record label VIP Music Records and Fabrizio's Talent Agency with the goal of building a pop culture platform that can be used to give media attention to political causes he cares about.

=== Secret Hit Music ===
In August 2018, founded a platform called Secret Hit Music. The platform gathers a team that combines the intuition of new talent and producers with songwriters that eventually has reach many countries in Latin America, as a platform for upcoming songwriters and producers, having their first songwriting camp in collaboration with Broadcast Music, Inc.

== Political views ==
Moreira is a member of Ecuador's Social Christian Party and has a libertarian political ideology. In his political career, he has promoted ideas of free market policies and entrepreneurship.

In 2008, he was accused of promoting destabilizing activities against the former President of Ecuador, Rafael Correa. On behalf of the nongovernmental organization CIT Ecuador, Moreira called the accusations "unfounded".

That same year, Moreira organized a rally in support of political freedom called "Youth for a free democracy" in Manta during the visit of former Venezuelan president Hugo Chávez to Ecuador. The event was censored by Chavez and Ecuadorian government officials, and a government-mandated media blackout was in effect.

He was eventually forced to leave Ecuador, and now works as a political activist from his residence in Brooklyn, New York. He has since been invited to speak in Spain, Colombia, Chile, and Peru on the subject of economics and entrepreneurship.

== Publications ==
He has been interviewed as a consultant in several magazines and media of entrepreneurship and politics about Ecuadorian national reality, marketing tips, business growth, etc. In 2017 he published a book of entrepreneurship called: "A real job can kill your dreams", at the moment it is sold on virtual platforms such as Amazon and iTunes, its firm edition is expected in its native country of Ecuador under a publishing house still to be established.

=== Works ===
A Real Job Can Kill Real Dreams (2017). English.
