= Father's Chair =

2012 film directed by Luciano Moura

- Theatrical release poster
- Portuguese: A Busca
- Directed by: Luciano Moura
- Written by: Luciano Moura; Elena Soarez
- Starring: Wagner Moura; Lima Duarte; Mariana Lima; Brás Antunes
- Cinematography: Adrian Teijido
- Edited by: Lucas Gonzaga
- Production company: Globo Filmes
- Distributed by: Downtown Filmes
- Release dates: January 20, 2012 (Sundance Film Festival); March 15, 2013 (Brazil)
- Running time: 96 minutes
- Country: Brazil
- Language: Portuguese
- Budget: R$5 million
- Box office: R$3,686,889

Father's Chair (Portuguese: A Busca; lit. 'The Search') is a 2012 Brazilian drama film directed by Luciano Moura. It follows the story of Theo, a man who always gave priority to career, until the day that his 15-year-old son goes missing. It was shot in Campinas, Paulínia, and in the coast of the state of São Paulo. The film was selected for the World Cinema at 2012 Sundance Film Festival and for the Première Brasil at 2012 Festival do Rio.

== Plot ==
Theo is a doctor that leads a good life in a wealthy Brazilian neighborhood. He always gave priority to work, leaving the family at second plan, but little by little Theo discovers that everything around him is collapsing. His mentor and father figure is dying and his wife wants to divorce him. But nothing could prepare him for the day that his 15-year-old son, Pedro, disappeared without a trace. Theo embarks on a quest that leads him through Brazil, discovering what really matters to him. Searching for his missing son, Theo finds himself.

== Cast ==
- Wagner Moura as Theo Gadelha
- Mariana Lima as Branca
- Lima Duarte as Emiliano Gadelha
- Brás Antunes as Pedro
- Abrahão Farc as Firmino
