= Wagner Moura =

Brazilian actor (born 1976)

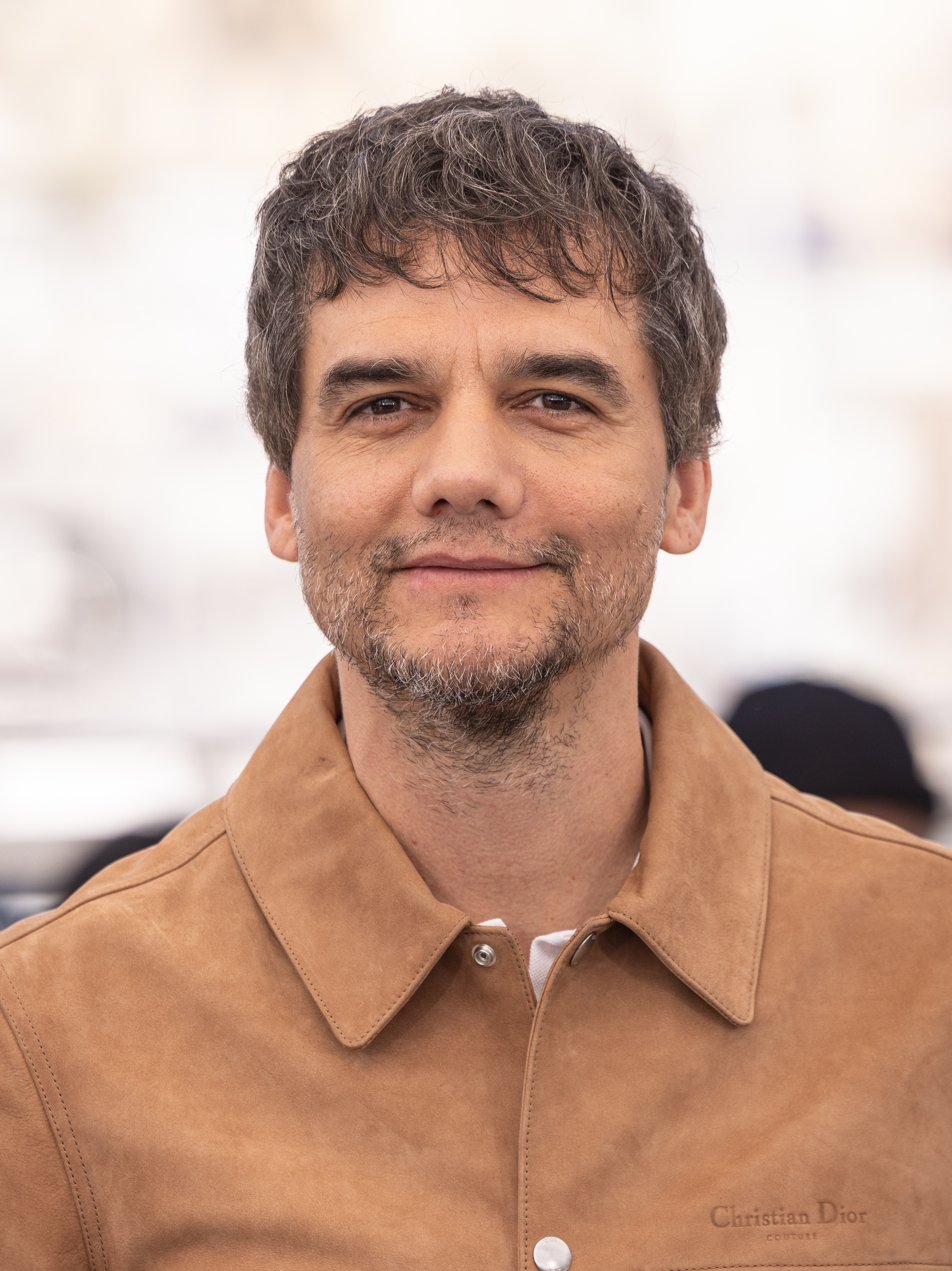
- Moura at the 2025 Cannes Film Festival
- Born: Wagner Maniçoba de Moura; June 27, 1976 (age 50); Salvador, Bahia, Brazil
- Education: Federal University of Bahia
- Occupations: Actor; filmmaker
- Years active: 1996–present
- Partner: Sandra Delgado (2001–present)
- Children: 3

Wagner Maniçoba de Moura (/ˈvɑːɡnər ˈmɔːrə, ˈmoʊrə/ VAHG-nər MOR-ə, MOHR-ə; Portuguese pronunciation: [ˈvaɡneʁ mɐ̃niˈsɔbɐ dʒi ˈmowɾɐ]; born June 27, 1976) is a Brazilian and American actor and filmmaker. His accolades include a Golden Globe, a Cannes Film Festival Award, and five Brazilian Academy Film Awards, in addition to nominations for an Academy Award, an Annie Award, and two Critics' Choice Award. Time magazine named him one of the 100 most influential people in the world in 2026.

After establishing himself in Brazil with a leading role as Captain Nascimento in the crime film Elite Squad (2007) and its 2010 sequel, Moura expanded into American cinema with a supporting role in the science fiction film Elysium (2013), finding himself part of the movement that seeks positive representation for South Americans in Hollywood. In 2015, he received international attention and critical acclaim for his portrayal of drug trafficker Pablo Escobar in the Netflix crime series Narcos, resulting in his first Golden Globe Award nomination.

Moura gained further recognition for his performances in the drama Sergio (2020), the animated film Puss in Boots: The Last Wish (2022), the action thriller Civil War (2024), and the miniseries Dope Thief (2025). For his performance as a former professor in the political thriller film The Secret Agent (2025), Moura became the first South American actor to win the Cannes Film Festival Award for Best Actor, the first Brazilian actor to win the Golden Globe Award for Best Actor, and the first Brazilian to be nominated for an Academy Award for Best Actor. Moura has also expanded into directing, making his feature directorial debut with the political thriller Marighella (2019).

== Early life ==
Moura was born in Salvador and raised in Rodelas, 540 kilometres (340 mi) from the capital. His father was in the military so the family, including his mother and his younger sister Lediane (who now works as a pediatrician), became used to moving around. His relationship with acting started thanks to a schoolmate who had a passion for the arts.

He became best friends with Emmy-nominated actor Lázaro Ramos during their teenage years in Bahia. Ramos reported that his friend was a great supporter of his career since their youth.

== Career ==
=== Early career (1996–2005) ===
Moura took acting classes in his teens, and started working in professional theater in 1996. Later, he graduated in journalism at the Federal University of Bahia. He had a small PR company that worked for other local actors and theater companies but the business soon went bankrupt. In the early 2000s, he was a reporter for an interview program on TV Bahia – an affiliate of Rede Globo – and covered high society parties interviewing businessmen and celebrities.

During this time, Moura continued going to auditions because he aspired to become an actor. He found some success with the play A Máquina. Receiving critical and public acclaim, the show left Bahia and went on the road to Pernambuco, São Paulo and Rio de Janeiro where it continued to succeed. The hit show boosted the careers of Moura and his colleagues, now-successful Brazilian actors Lázaro Ramos and Vladimir Brichta.

In cinema, he started with the shorts Pop Killer, by Victor Mascarenhas, and Rádio Gogó, by José Araripe Jr. His first feature was Woman on Top, by the Venezuelan director Fina Torres, in which he had a small role with Ramos, whom he helped with the tests in English, since Ramos did not speak the language.

With the resumption of Brazilian cinema opening up to new faces, he got roles in several productions with important names, such as Behind the Sun, by Walter Salles; The Three Marias, by Aluizio Abranches; God Is Brazilian, by Cacá Diegues; Nina, by Heitor Dhalia; The Man of the Year, by José Henrique Fonseca; The Middle of the World, by Vicente Amorim. In Recife, during the filming of God Is Brazilian, Moura was reading the book Carandiru Station by Drauzio Varella when he found out about the auditions for the film Carandiru. Because he was busy with the recordings and unable to appear in the face-to-face auditions in another state, he asked the person in charge of the making to help him record a tape that would be sent to the production. The material was very dark, and it was only possible to hear the actor reading excerpts from the book. Some time later, Héctor Babenco would call him for a meeting in São Paulo, curious to meet the owner of the voice. The actor ended up joining the cast as the prisoner, dealer and drug addict Zico.

He debuted on television after famous Brazilian actor and his costar in God Is Brazilian, Antônio Fagundes, invited him for a small role in the popular series Carga Pesada on Rede Globo. Then came the series Sexo Frágil, which entered the network's Friday night schedule after its success as a sketch on the TV show Fantástico.

The play Dilúvio em Tempos de Seca was shown in Rio de Janeiro and São Paulo, and ended its season at the Curitiba Theater Festival at Teatro Guaíra before an audience of more than four thousand people in the two days it was presented. With the end of the work, the actor would turn to television and cinema.

In 2005, he debuted in telenovelas with A Lua Me Disse as Gustavo Bogari Prado, the comic role was a contrast to the other characters he had played before. He also portrayed a young version of Brazil's former president Juscelino Kubitschek in the limited series JK (2006).

=== Breakout in Brazilian cinema and TV (2007–2012) ===
In 2007, Moura starred as police officer Captain Nascimento in José Padilha's Elite Squad. The film won the Golden Bear at the 58th Berlin International Film Festival and was a box office hit in Brazil, but generated controversy for its portrayal of police brutality and urban violence in Rio de Janeiro. He also had lead roles in Ó Paí, Ó, Saneamento Básico, A Máquina and Romance. He also portrayed the corrupt businessman Olavo Novaes in TV Globo's Paraíso Tropical. For his cinema and television roles, he was named "Man of the Year" in 2007 by Vogue Brazil.

In 2008, he returned to theater with Hamlet by William Shakespeare. The theatrical process was recorded by his wife, Sandra, and became a documentary. He also starred in three short films: Desejo, Ópera do Mallandro and Blackout, which premiered at the Festival de Gramado. He also resumed concert performances with his band Sua Mãe.

In 2010, he portrayed Nascimento once again in Elite Squad: The Enemy Within. Like its predecessor, the film was met with critical acclaim and became the largest box office ticket seller and highest-grossing film of all time in Brazil.

In 2011, he was honored at the Braskem Theater Award. In 2012, he was a guest vocalist for the "MTV Live: Tribute to Legião Urbana" held in São Paulo and broadcast by MTV Brasil. Moura was a big fan of the band, which disbanded in 1996. In 2013, he was elected Man of the Year by GQ Brazil in the cinema category and honored at the Gramado Film Festival.

=== Hollywood and directorial debut (2013–present) ===
The film Elysium (2013) marked his Hollywood debut, portraying Spider. Moura got the role after his agents showed his work in Elite Squad 2 to the producers.

In 2014, he starred in Karim Aïnouz's Futuro Beach as a gay lifeguard from Recife who travels to Germany after falling in love with a tourist. He also starred in the anthology film Rio, I Love You, in the segment directed by José Padilha. As a director, he worked on the music video for the song "Te Amo" from the album Bicicletas, Bolos e Outras Alegrias by Brazilian singer Vanessa da Mata.

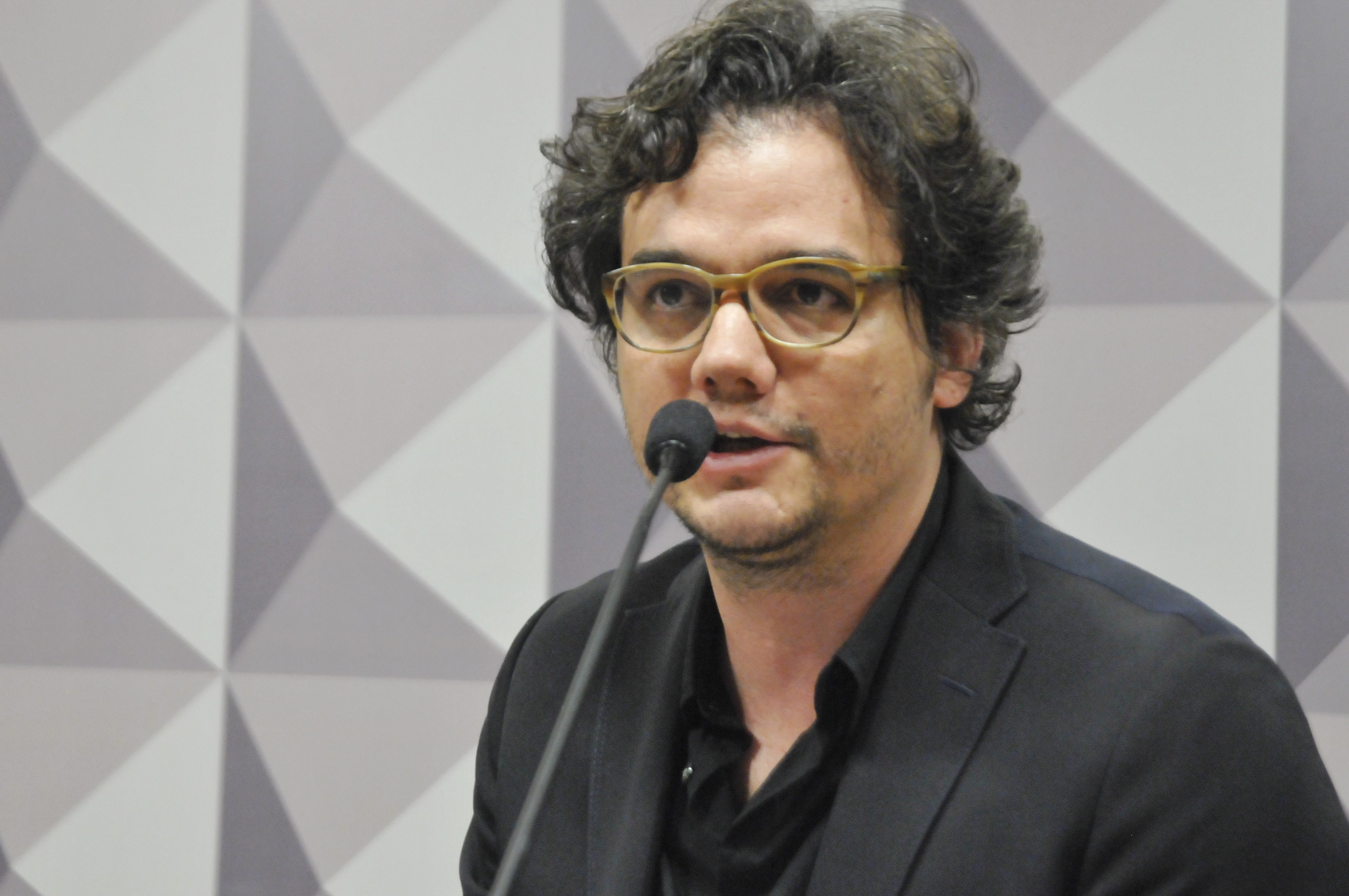
Moura in 2015

In 2015, Moura starred as Colombian drug lord Pablo Escobar in Narcos. Moura learned to speak Spanish while preparing for his role. He also had to gain over 18 kilograms (40 pounds). After the second season, he decided to lose the weight through an all-vegan diet. His performance was praised by critics. For the role, Moura was nominated for the Golden Globe Award for Best Actor – Television Series Drama.

In 2019, he starred as Juan Pablo Roque in Wasp Network, directed by Olivier Assayas.

Wagner Moura's feature directing debut, Marighella, had its world premiere at the 69th Berlin International Film Festival, and a delayed theatrical release in Brazil in 2021. The film is a biopic of Carlos Marighella, a politician and guerrilla fighter facing the heinous crimes torture and censorship during the military dictatorship in Brazil. Moura says he is sure the film was censored by right-wing former president Jair Bolsonaro, though the official reason for the delay was the COVID-19 pandemic. At the 2022 Brazilian Film Grand Prix, Marighella won eight awards, including Best Film, Best First Director and Best Adapted Screenplay for Moura.

In 2020, he signed with WME. He was a part of the official international fiction jury of the Sundance Film Festival. He also produced and starred as the title character in the Netflix drama Sergio, about Brazilian diplomat Sérgio Vieira de Mello.

In 2021, he joined the Academy of Motion Picture Arts and Sciences in Hollywood. He also directed two episodes of Narcos: Mexico's third season.

In 2022, he starred in the Apple TV+ series Shining Girls, in the role of journalist Dan Velásquez. He starred in Puss in Boots: The Last Wish, voicing the Wolf. He also starred in Netflix's The Gray Man, directed by the Russo Brothers, as Laszlo Sosa, for which he lost twenty kilos.

In 2024, he played a recurring role as John Smith's agent in the Prime Video series Mr. & Mrs. Smith.

In 2025, he starred as Marcelo in Kleber Mendonça Filho's The Secret Agent. For the role he became the first South American actor to ever win the Cannes Film Festival Award for Best Actor, the first Latin-American actor to win the NYFCC for Best Actor, and received his first Golden Globe, as well as becoming the first Brazilian actor to be nominated for the Academy Award for Best Actor. The film received four Academy Award nominations, including Best Actor, but did not win in any category.

In 2026, Moura voiced Brander Lawson in the Disney animated series Star Wars: Maul – Shadow Lord. That August, he played Thomas Stockmann in A Trial: After an Enemy of the People, a reworking of Henrik Ibsen's An Enemy of the People conceived and directed by Christiane Jatahy, which he co-wrote with Jatahy and Lucas Paraizo. The production was staged at the Lyceum Theatre as part of the Edinburgh International Festival. Critics praised Moura's stage presence: Arifa Akbar of The Guardian described him as a charismatic force, and Vanessa Thorpe of The Observer considered his performance the production's strongest element, although both reviewers found the play's moral debate lacking in force.

== Personal life ==
Moura's native language is Portuguese, but he also speaks English and Spanish fluently. He did not speak Spanish prior to his casting as Pablo Escobar in Narcos, and spent several weeks in Medellín, Colombia learning the language to prepare for the role. He practices Transcendental Meditation, Muay Thai and Brazilian Jiu-Jitsu. In December 2023, Moura was promoted to brown belt in Brazilian Jiu-Jitsu by Rigan Machado.

Moura has three sons with journalist and photographer Sandra Delgado. Moura and Delgado met at university but only got involved after they graduated. At the time, he was moving to Rio and invited her to go with him. She accepted, despite the fact that they had only been dating for a short time. The couple has not formally married. The family has residences in Salvador, Los Angeles, and Rio de Janeiro. He became a United States citizen in 2023.

=== Political views ===
During Donald Trump's second term, Moura became a vocal critic of the administration's immigration enforcement policies, stating that he feared encounters with Immigration and Customs Enforcement (ICE) and describing the situation as a "war on immigrants." He has drawn parallels between the political climate in the United States under Trump and Brazil's experience under far-right President Jair Bolsonaro (2019–2023), arguing that his firsthand experience with authoritarianism in Brazil offers a warning for American democracy.

In October 2026, Moura was among the Brazilian members of the Academy of Motion Picture Arts and Sciences, alongside Kleber Mendonça Filho and Fernando Meirelles, who signed an open letter raising concerns over the second round of the Brazilian presidential election, led by Flávio Bolsonaro against incumbent Luiz Inácio Lula da Silva, and the risk of dismantling of the Brazilian audiovisual industry by the Bolsonaro family.

== Acting credits ==
Key
†	Denotes films that have not yet been released

=== Feature films ===
Year	Title	Role	Notes
1998	Pop Killer		Short film
1999	Rádio Gogó	Replay	Short film
2000	Woman on Top	Rafi	
2001	Behind the Sun	Matheus	
2002	The Three Marias	Jesuíno Cruz	
2003	God Is Brazilian	Taoca	
2003	The Man of the Year	Suel	
2003	Carandiru	Zico	
2003	The Middle of the World	Romão	
2004	Nina	Blind Man	
2005	Lower City	Naldinho	
2005	A Máquina	TV Host	
2007	Ó Paí, Ó	Boca	
2007	Saneamento Básico	Joaquim	
2007	Elite Squad	Captain Roberto Nascimento	
2008	Romance	Pedro	
2008	Blackout	Marcelo	
2009	They Killed Sister Dorothy	Narrator	Brazilian version
2010	Elite Squad: The Enemy Within	Lieutenant Colonel Roberto Nascimento	
2010	VIPs	Marcelo Nascimento da Rocha	
2011	The Man from the Future	João (Zero)	
2012	Father's Chair	Theo	
2013	Elysium	Spider	
2013	Bald Mountain	Lindo Rico	
2013	Futuro Beach	Donato	
2014	Rio, I Love You	Gui	Segment "Inútil Paisagem"
2014	Trash	José Angelo	
2017	Vidas Cinzas	Wagner	Short film
2019	Marighella	Interrogator (voice)	Also director, writer, and producer
2019	Wasp Network	Juan Pablo Roque	
2020	Sergio	Sérgio Vieira de Mello	Also producer
2021	Meu Tio José	José (voice)	
2022	The Gray Man	Laszlo Sosa	
2022	Puss in Boots: The Last Wish	Death (voice)	
2024	Civil War	Joel	
2025	The Secret Agent	Armando "Marcelo" Solimões / Adult Fernando	Also co-producer
2026	The Last Day	Peter	
2026	The Last House	Jason	
2026	Forgotten Island	Flaming aswang chef (voice)	
2027	Untitled Ocean's Eleven prequel †		Filming
TBA	O Aroma da Pitanga †	TBA	Post-production
TBA	Flesh of the Gods †	Raoul	Post-production

=== Television ===
Year	Title	Role	Notes
2003	Carga Pesada	Pedrinho	Episode: "Carga Perecível"
2003–2004	Sexo Frágil	Edu / Magali	20 episodes
2004	Programa Novo	Magali	1 episode
2005	A Lua Me Disse	Gustavo Bogari	Telenovela
2006	JK	Juscelino Kubitschek (ages 18–43)	
2007	Paraíso Tropical	Olavo Novaes	Telenovela
2013	A Menina Sem Qualidades	Alex's Father	Mini-series
2015–2016	Narcos	Pablo Escobar	20 episodes
2018, 2021	Narcos: Mexico	Pablo Escobar	Cameo, 1 episode, Director, 2 episodes
2022	Shining Girls	Dan Velasquez	Main role
2024	Mr. & Mrs. Smith	Second Other John	2 episodes
2025	Dope Thief	Manny Carvalho	Main role
2026	Star Wars: Maul – Shadow Lord	Brander Lawson (voice)	Main role

=== Theatre ===
Year	Title	Role
1996	Cuida bem de mim	
1996	A Casa de Eros	
1999	Abismos de Rosas	
2000	A Máquina	Antônio
2002	Os Solitários	
2005	Dilúvio em Tempos de Secas	
2005	O Que Diz Molero	
2008	Hamlet	Hamlet
2026	A Trial: After an Enemy of the People	Thomas Stockmann

=== Documentary appearances ===
Year	Title	Role	Notes
2009	They Killed Sister Dorothy	Narrator (voice)	Brazilian version
2016	Entre os Homens de Bem	Himself	
2017	Os 8 Magníficos	Himself	

== Accolades ==
=== Film ===
Year	Awards	Category	Nominated work	Outcome
2002	Ceará Film Festival	Best Actor	The Three Marias	Won
2003	Qualidade Brasil Awards	Best Actor	The Middle of the World	Nominated
2004	Cartagena Film Festival	Best Actor	The Middle of the World	Won
2004	Cartagena Film Festival	Best Supporting Cast	Carandiru	Won
2004	São Paulo Art Critics Association	Best Actor	God Is Brazilian	Won
2005	Festival de Cine Iberoamericano de Huelva	Best Actor	Lower City	Won
2006	Prêmio Contigo! de Cinema Nacional	Best Actor	Lower City	Nominated
2006	Prêmio Qualidade Brasil	Best Actor	A Máquina	Nominated
2007	Brazilian Academy Film Awards	Best Actor	Lower City	Nominated
2007	Prêmio Qualidade Brasil	Best Actor	Elite Squad	Won
2008	Prêmio Contigo! de Cinema Nacional	Best Actor	Elite Squad	Nominated
2008	Brazilian Academy Film Awards	Best Actor	Elite Squad	Won
2009	Brazilian Academy Film Awards	Best Actor	Romance	Nominated
2010	Rio de Janeiro International Film Festival	Best Actor	VIPs	Won
2011	Brazilian Film Festival of Miami	Best Actor	VIPs	Won
2011	Prêmio Contigo! de Cinema Nacional	Best Actor (audience award)	Elite Squad 2	Won
2011	São Paulo Art Critics Association	Best Actor	Elite Squad 2	Won
2011	CinePort	Best Actor	Elite Squad 2	Won
2011	Brazilian Academy Film Awards	Best Actor	Elite Squad 2	Won
2012	Brazilian Academy Film Awards	Best Actor	VIPs	Nominated
2012	Brazilian Academy Film Awards	Best Actor	O Homem do Futuro	Nominated
2012	Prêmio Contigo! de Cinema Nacional	Best Actor	O Homem do Futuro	Nominated
2013	Gramado Film Festival	Troféu Cidade de Gramado	—	Won
2013	Los Angeles Brazilian Film Festival	Best Actor	Father's Chair	Won
2014	Grande Prêmio do Cinema Brasileiro	Best Actor	Father's Chair	Nominated
2014	Grande Prêmio do Cinema Brasileiro	Best Supporting Actor	Serra Pelada	Won
2015	Prêmio Guarani de Cinema Brasileiro	Best Actor	Futuro Beach	Won
2019	Seattle International Film Festival	Best Ibero American Film	Marighella	Nominated
2019	Mill Valley Film Festival	Best Picture (audience award)	Marighella	Won
2019	Festival Internacional de Cinema de Istambul	Best Internacional Film	Marighella	Nominated
2020	CinEuphoria Awards	Best Picture (internacional competition)	Marighella	Nominated
2020	Imagen Awards	Best Movie Actor	Sergio	Won
2021	Prêmio Arcanjo de Cultura	Film	Marighella	Nominated
2021	Prêmio Abraccine 2021	Top 10 – Feature Film - Brazil	Marighella	Won
2021	Prêmio APCA	Best Ensemble	Marighella	Won
2021	G1 Melhores Filmes do Ano	Best Picture (audience award)	Marighella	Won
2022	Prêmio Platino 2022	Best Director	Marighella	Nominated
2022	FestPunta 2022	Best Director	Marighella	Won
2022	Festival Sesc Melhores Filmes	Best Brazilian Feature (audience award)	Marighella	Won
2022	Festival Sesc Melhores Filmes	Best Brazilian Director (audience award)	Marighella	Won
2022	Festival Sesc Melhores Filmes	Best Brazilian Screenplay (audience award)	Marighella	Won
2022	Festival Sesc Melhores Filmes	Best Brazilian Feature (critics choice)	Marighella	Won
2022	Festival Sesc Melhores Filmes	Best Brazilian Director (critics choice)	Marighella	Won
2022	Prêmio ABRA de Roteiro	Best Adapted Screenplay (Fiction)	Marighella	Nominated
2022	Brazilian Academy Film Awards	Best Picture	Marighella	Won
2022	Brazilian Academy Film Awards	Best Directorial Debut	Marighella	Won
2022	Brazilian Academy Film Awards	Best Adapted Screenplay	Marighella	Won
2022	CCXP Awards	Best Picture (Brazil)	Marighella	Nominated
2022	CCXP Awards	Best Directing	Marighella	Nominated
2022	Brazilian Cinema Guarani Awards	Best Picture	Marighella	Nominated
2022	Brazilian Cinema Guarani Awards	Best Director	Marighella	Nominated
2022	Brazilian Cinema Guarani Awards	Best Adapted Screenplay	Marighella	Won
2023	Annie Awards	Outstanding Achievement for Voice Acting in an Animated Feature Production	Puss in Boots: The Last Wish	Nominated
2025	Austin Film Critics Association	Best Actor	The Secret Agent	Nominated
2025	Boston Online Film Critics Association	Best Actor	The Secret Agent	Won
2025	Cannes Film Festival	Best Actor	The Secret Agent	Won
2025	Chicago International Film Festival	Best Actor	The Secret Agent	Won
2025	Chicago Film Critics Association	Best Actor	The Secret Agent	Nominated
2025	Gotham Awards	Outstanding Lead Performance	The Secret Agent	Nominated
2025	Los Angeles Film Critics Association	Best Lead Performance	The Secret Agent	Runner-up
2025	New York Film Critics Circle Awards	Best Actor	The Secret Agent	Won
2025	New York Film Critics Online	Best Actor	The Secret Agent	Nominated
2025	Newport Beach Film Festival	Outstanding Performance	The Secret Agent	Won
2025	San Diego Film Critics Society	Best Actor	The Secret Agent	Nominated
2025	San Francisco Bay Area Film Critics Circle	Best Actor	The Secret Agent	Nominated
2025	St. Louis Film Critics Association	Best Actor	The Secret Agent	Nominated
2025	Toronto Film Critics Association	Outstanding Lead Performance	The Secret Agent	Runner-up
2025	Zurich Film Festival	Golden Eye Award for Achievement in Acting	The Secret Agent	Won
2026	Academy Awards	Best Actor	The Secret Agent	Nominated
2026	Astra Film Awards	Best Actor – Drama	The Secret Agent	Nominated
2026	Astra Film Awards	Acting Achievement Award	The Secret Agent	Honored
2026	Critics' Choice Awards	Best Actor	The Secret Agent	Nominated
2026	Golden Globe Awards	Best Actor in a Motion Picture – Drama	The Secret Agent	Won
2026	IndieWire Honors	Performance Award	The Secret Agent	Won
2026	London Film Critics' Circle	Actor of the Year	The Secret Agent	Nominated
2026	National Society of Film Critics	Best Actor	The Secret Agent	Runner-up
2026	International Cinephile Society	Best Actor	The Secret Agent	Won
2026	Paris Film Critics Awards	Best Actor	The Secret Agent	Won
2026	Platino Awards	Best Actor	The Secret Agent	Won
2026	Santa Barbara International Film Festival	Virtuoso Award	The Secret Agent	Won
2026	São Paulo Art Critics Association (APCA)	Best Actor	The Secret Agent	Won
2026	Satellite Awards	Best Actor in a Motion Picture – Drama	The Secret Agent	Won
2026	Latino Entertainment Journalists Association	Best Actor	The Secret Agent	Won

=== Television ===
Year	Awards	Category	Nominated work	Outcome
2005	Prêmio Qualidade Brasil	Best Actor	A Lua Me Disse	Nominated
2006	Prêmio Contigo! de TV	Best Actor	A Lua Me Disse	Nominated
2006	Prêmio Qualidade Brasil	Best Actor	JK	Nominated
2007	Prêmio Contigo! de TV	Best Actor	JK	Nominated
2007	Prêmio Extra de Televisão	Best Actor	Paraíso Tropical	Won
2007	Troféu APCA	Best Actor of Television	Paraíso Tropical	Won
2007	Prêmio Quem de Televisão	Best Actor	Paraíso Tropical	Won
2007	Melhores do Ano	Best Actor	Paraíso Tropical	Won
2008	Troféu Imprensa	Best Actor	Paraíso Tropical	Won
2008	Troféu Internet	Best Actor	Paraíso Tropical	Won
2008	Prêmio Contigo! de TV	Best Actor	Paraíso Tropical	Won
2016	Golden Globe Awards	Best Actor (Television Series Drama)	Narcos	Nominated
2016	Imagen Awards	Best Actor (Television)	Narcos	Nominated
2026	Critics' Choice Awards	Best Supporting Actor in a Movie/Miniseries	Dope Thief	Nominated

=== Theater ===
Year	Awards	Category	Nominated work	Outcome
1997	Braskem Theater Awards	Breakout Performance	Abismo de Rosas	Won
2008	Qualidade Brasil Awards	Best Actor in Play	Hamlet	Won
2008	São Paulo Art Critics Association Awards	Best Actor in Play	Hamlet	Nominated
2008	Contigo! Theater Awards	Best Leading Actor	Hamlet	Won

== See also ==
- List of Brazilian Academy Award winners and nominees
- List of actors nominated for Academy Awards for non-English performances
- List of actors with Academy Award nominations
- List of Golden Globe winners
