= Rewind Life =

2011 film directed by Luiz Sanetia

- Official poster
- Directed by: Luiz Saneti
- Written by: Luiz Saneti
- Produced by: Luiz Saneti
- Starring: Stela Marianno; Adriano Baluz; Marina Vásques; Emanuel Risaint; João Valzack
- Cinematography: Luiz Saneti
- Edited by: Luiz Saneti
- Music by: Luiz Fernando Saneti
- Production company: Luiz Saneti Entertainment
- Release date: October 23, 2011 (Brazil)
- Running time: 94 min
- Country: Brazil
- Language: Portuguese

Rewind Life (Portuguese: Reversão da Vida) is a 2011 Brazilian mystery-supernatural film directed and written by Luiz Sanetia. It stars Stela Marianno, Adriano Baluz, Marina Vásques, João Valzack and Emanuel Risain.

== Plot ==
The film tells the story of two journalists investigating the mysterious death of a woman who got to discover the source of eternal life using some rare books stored inside the National Library. Vatican officials have come to Brazil to warn that the angel of darkness Lucifer is acting on Earth through some followers with the intent to possess immortality. However, the code is stored in one place in the confines of the human mind. And the reversal of life is the only option to save humanity.

== Cast ==
- Stela Marianno ... Ana
- Adriano Baluz ... Beto
- Emanuel Risaint ... Husayn
- Calu Lobo ... Laura
- Samuel Cruz ... Priest Bruna
- João Valzack ... Pedro
- Gastón Stefani ... Lucas
- Viviane Adriano ... Teacher Débora
- Esther Delamare ... Dona Torres (Jéssica adult)
- Helena Dias ... Nurse
- Greyce Kelly ... Jéssica
- Marina Vásques ... Maria
- Reinaldo Fusco ... Librarian
