= The Man from the Future =

2011 film directed by Cláudio Torres

O Homem do Futuro
- Theatrical release poster
- Directed by: Cláudio Torres
- Written by: Cláudio Torres
- Produced by: Tatiana Quintella; Cláudio Torres
- Starring: Wagner Moura; Alinne Moraes; Gabriel Braga Nunes; Maria Luisa Mendonça; Fernando Ceylão
- Cinematography: Ricardo Della Rosa
- Edited by: Sérgio Mekler
- Music by: Luca Raele; Mauricio Tagliari
- Production companies: Conspiração Filmes; Globo Filmes
- Distributed by: Paramount Pictures
- Release date: September 2, 2011
- Running time: 106 minutes
- Country: Brazil
- Language: Portuguese
- Budget: R$8 million
- Box office: R$11,498,810

The Man from the Future (Portuguese: O Homem do Futuro) is a 2011 Brazilian science fiction romantic comedy film directed by Cláudio Torres. The film stars Wagner Moura and Alinne Moraes. It was shot in Paulínia and Campinas in the state of São Paulo, and in Rio de Janeiro.

== Plot ==
In 2011, João "Zero", a bitter but brilliant physicist, spends his days brooding over a fateful night 20 years before when he was publicly betrayed and humiliated at a college party by his then-girlfriend, Helena. He now heads one of the largest scientific projects in Brazil, but his eccentricities and tantrums have brought him to the verge of being fired by his former college roommate and current sponsor, Sandra, although she still believes in his project, and tries to defend him.

Aided by his best friend and fellow scientist, Otávio, João turns on the unfinished machine he has developed that was supposed to ensure his wealth as well as a new source of sustainable energy. Entering the machine, he thinks of the night when Helena humiliated him. To his surprise, the reaction caused by the machine opens a bridge to the past, leading him to the year 1991.

In 1991, a confused João wakes up and tries to go to his apartment, but finds that the key does not match. Upon asking the date to a stranger, the realizes that he has traveled through time. He goes to the party, where he sees his younger self having sex with Helena, after which she tells him that she loves him. After she leaves to sing on stage, the future João tells his younger self that he will invent a time machine, and he has come back to fix things. They find the young Otávio, and the future João tells them future technical and political events, so they will have money for the rest of their lives. After this, João tells his younger self that Helena's ex-boyfriend, Ricardo, will bring her champagne with a drug, and due to the effects, she will humiliate him on stage, by putting honey and feathers on him. After this, Helena will go with Ricardo to Spain, becoming a model and never seeing João again. The young João meets up with Helena, and tells her not to drink Ricardo's champagne. She doesn't, and an excited João tells her that he's going to be rich, and they will be together for the rest of their lives. The future João, watching the scene, disappears.

João wakes up in an alternate 2011 in which he is rich, but is not married to Helena. He learns that with his knowledge of the future, he founded the "Man From The Future" company; however, he has betrayed Otávio, divorced four times, and put Helena in jail after she was discovered holding a bag of his cocaine. He explains to Otávio that he is the João from the original timeline in the body of his new-timeline-self. After this, he has Helena released, and he donates to her all of his belongings. He reinstalls the time machine, dresses up as a spaceman, and then travels back to 1991.

In 1991, the João in the spaceman suit finds the original-future João and the young João in their meeting; this last one faints of the impression. The spaceman-João tries to convince the original-future João that he must live his life normally, but the original-future João refuses. The spaceman-João holds him at gunpoint, and makes him leave and let the original events of the night unfold. However, they are both encountered by the alternate-future Otávio, who traveled back in time after João left the alternate 2011. Meanwhile, the young João meets with Helena, disregarding his meeting with his other selves as a dream, and Ricardo approaches them with the champagne. João, however, is the one who drinks it, and he becomes drugged. The original-future João and alternate-future Otávio, wanting to change events, tie the spaceman-João in a separate location, in where he meets the young Sandra, to whom he proves he is from the future by showing her his iPhone and having her record a video. She unties him. The original-future João and alternate-future Otávio find the Helena and the drugged João, and hold them at gunpoint. They bring them where the spaceman-João is, and since he has been untied, he knocks out Otávio, and ties the original-future João. The spaceman-João then tells Helena to leave the young João, become a model, and meet him again 20 years in the future. They bring the young João on stage, in which he is put honey and feathers, humiliated, and given the nickname "Zero". The alternate-future Otávio disappears, as well as the original-future João and spaceman-João.

In 2011, after João enters the time machine and disappears, the spaceman João emerges, and destroys the source code of the time machine. He explains to a shocked Otávio that he has traveled through time, but the machine is too dangerous. He then shows him the video of the young Sandra, to prove his words. He leaves, and via Twitter he communicates with Helena, and they happily meet in an airport, where she fires Ricardo after 20 years of working with him.

A year later, João is found not guilty of destroying a science project. After exiting the courthouse, they meet with Sandra. At this point, it is revealed that before Sandra untied him in 1991, he told her to invest in Google and sponsor in João's projects, meaning that this timeline was the original one all along. Knowing that they have money for the rest of their lives, Helena and João look ahead to a better life, although Helena tells João that he "cheated".

== Cast ==
- Wagner Moura as João "Zero" Henrique
- Alinne Moraes as Helena
- Maria Luiza Mendonça as Sandra
- Gabriel Braga Nunes as Ricardo
- Fernando Ceylão as Otávio
