= Tadeu Jungle =

Brazilian multimedia artist

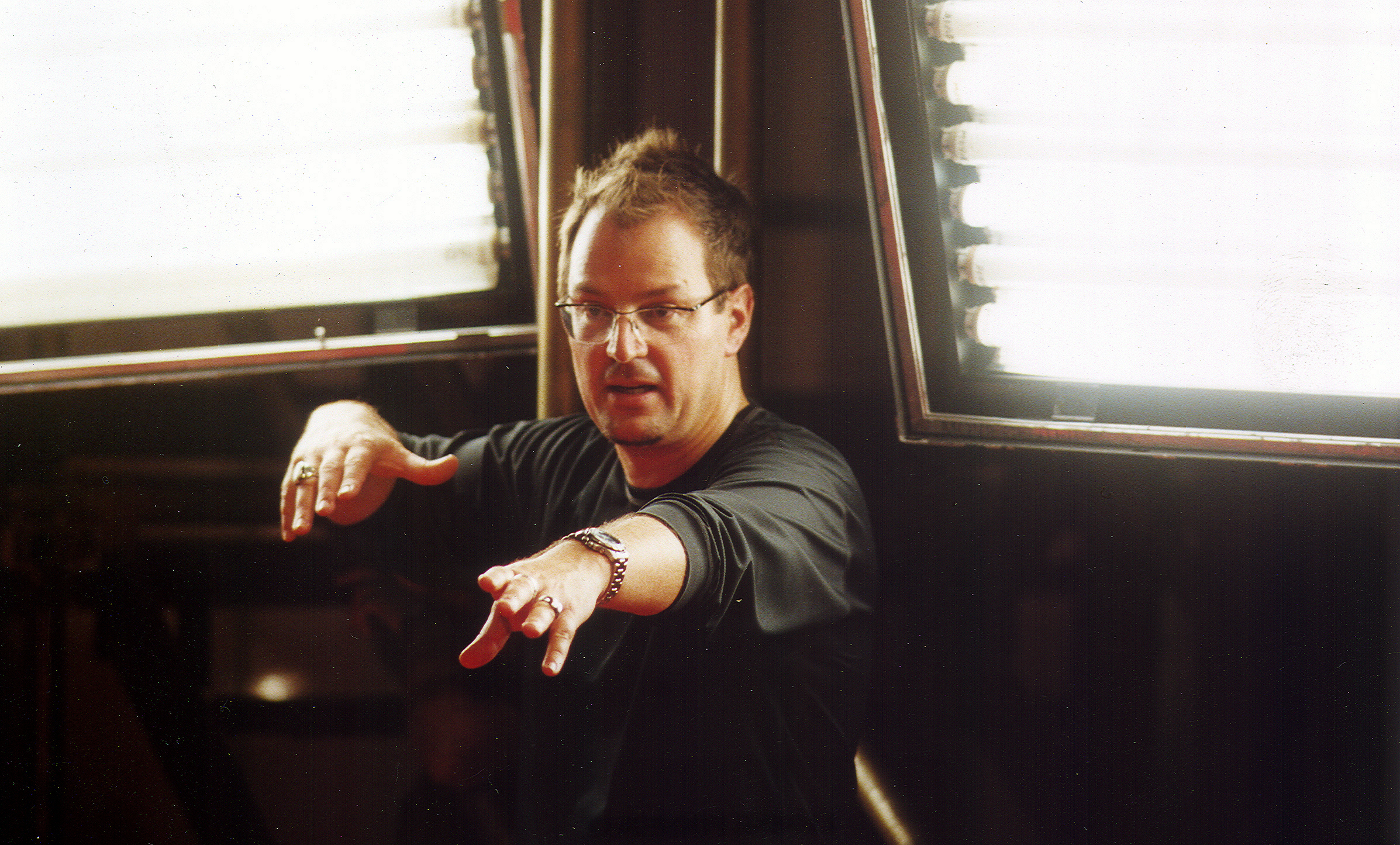
- Born: 1960 (age 65–66); São Paulo, Brazil
- Known for: Multimedia

Tadeu Jungle (born 1960 in São Paulo) is a Brazilian multimedia artist. He works as a videomaker, photographer, poet, designer, producer and director of cinema and television.

Graduated in Social Communication through the School of Communication and Arts, USP, in 1980, Tadeu Jungle was part of an inventive group called TVDO were, along with his friends, made various experimental productions. Arlindo Machado refers to them as part of the Brazilian independent video generation and most recently he directed two feature films: Amanhã Nunca Mais (Tomorrow Never More, 2011) and the documentary Evoé, Retrato de um Antropófago (Evoé, Portrait of an Anthropophagist, 2011), about the playwright Zé Celso Martinez Correa. He is currently married to the director and screenwriter Estela Renner.
