= Pindobaçu =

Municipality of Bahia, Brazil

Coordinates: 10°44′S 40°21′W

- Municipality
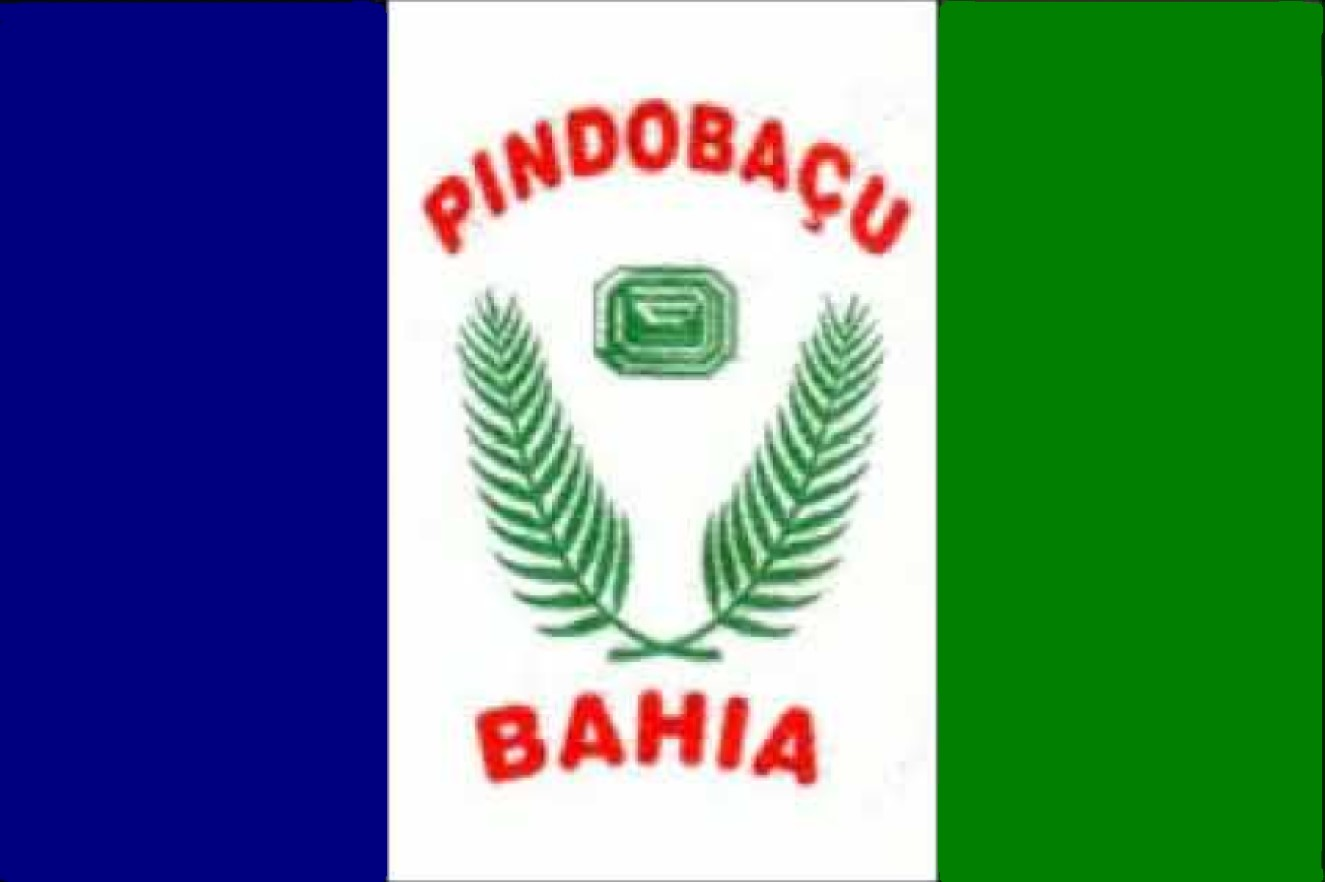
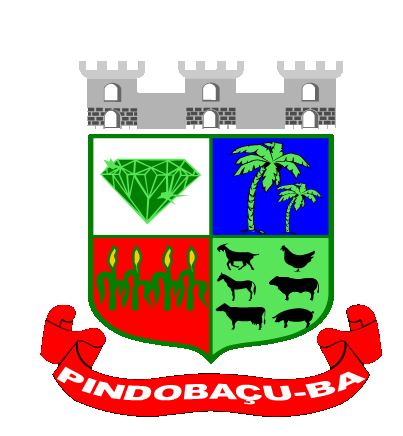
- Flag Coat of arms
- Interactive map of Pindobaçu
- Country: Brazil
- Region: Nordeste
- State: Bahia

Population (2020)
  - Total: 20,098
- Time zone: UTC−3 (BRT)

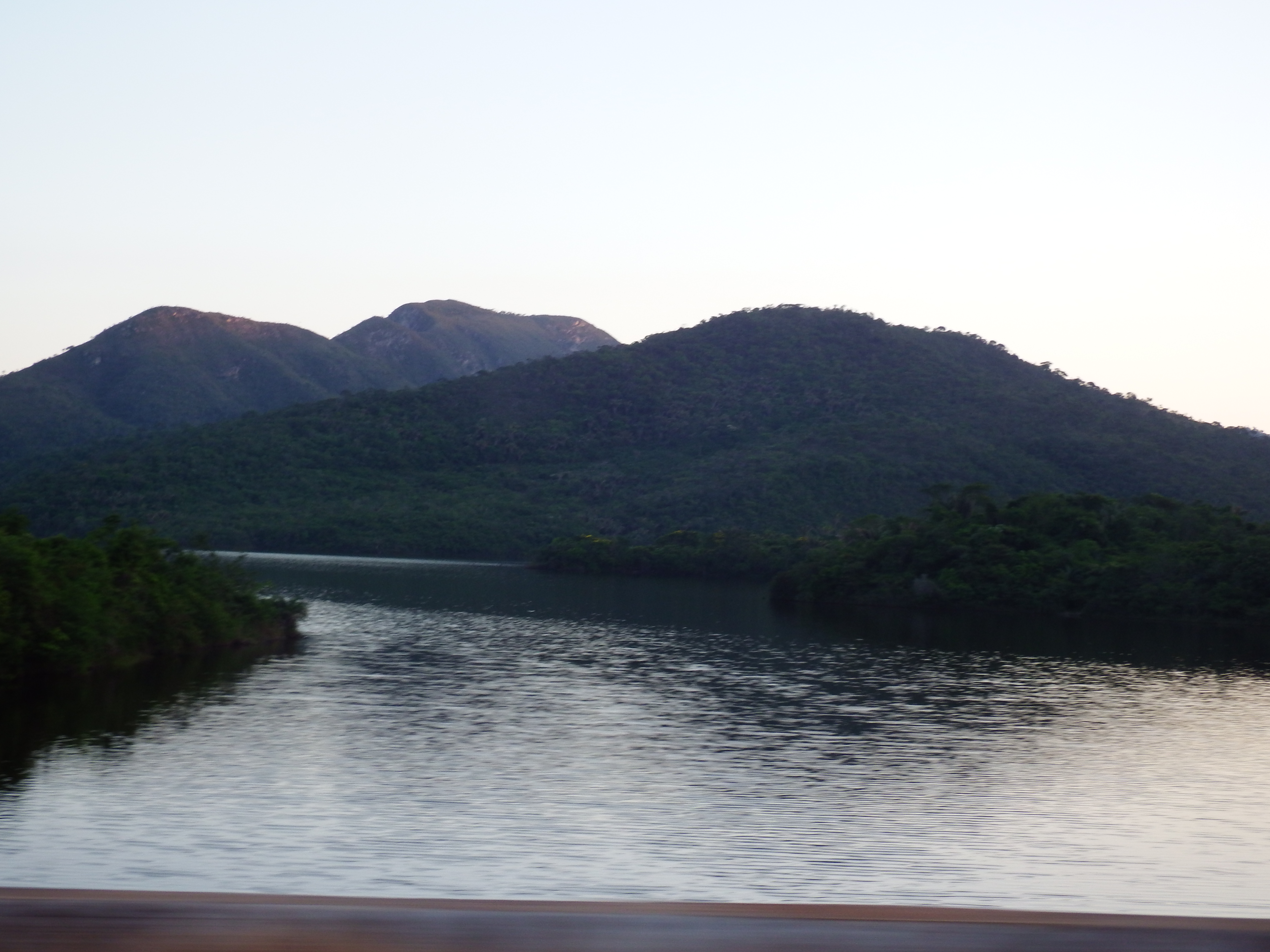
A river in Pindobaçu

Pindobaçu is a municipality in the state of Bahia in the North-East region of Brazil.

== See also ==
- List of municipalities in Bahia
