= Marcelo VIPs =

Brazilian business consultant (1976–2025)

- Born: Marcelo Nascimento da Rocha; 19 March 1976; Maringá, Paraná, Brazil
- Died: 9 December 2025 (aged 49); Joinville, Santa Catarina, Brazil
- Occupation: Businessman

Marcelo Nascimento da Rocha (19 March 1976 – 9 December 2025), best known as Marcelo VIPs, was a Brazilian businessman, consultant and speaker who served time in prison for fraud.

VIPs was one of Brazil's famous scammers between the 1990s and 2000s. Throughout his criminal career, he worked as a pilot for drug traffickers and also carried out numerous fraud schemes, assuming false identities for the purpose.

He was portrayed by Wagner Moura in the 2010 Brazilian drama film VIPs.

== Life and career ==
Marcelo Nascimento da Rocha was born in Maringá, Paraná on 19 March 1976. He was the son of Josélia Nascimento and Aparecido Hildo da Rocha. He had three siblings: Cynthia, Jack and Luiz.

In 1984, his parents divorced. Da Rocha began living between Paraná and Rondônia. After a few years, his father died from a heart attack.

VIPs was imprisoned many times for fraud and drug trafficking.

VIPs died in Joinville on 9 December 2025, at the age of 49, due to complications from cirrhosis.
