= Statue of Father Cícero =

Statue in Juazeiro do Norte, Brazil

Statue of Priest Cícero
- Estátua de Padre Cícero
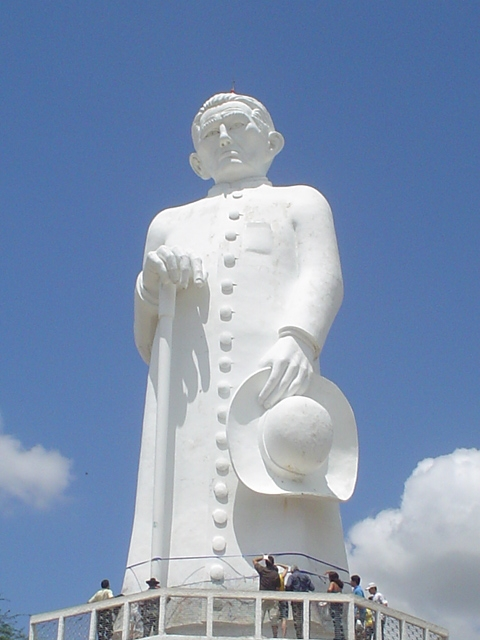
- Priest Cícero holding a hat
- Location: Juazeiro do Norte, Ceará, Brazil
- Coordinates: 7°10′47″S 39°19′48″W
- Designer: Armando Lacerda
- Completion date: 1969
- Opening date: November 1st, 1969
- Dedicated to: Priest Cícero

The Statue of Priest Cícero on the Colina do Horto is a monument built in homage to Priest Cícero, located in Juazeiro do Norte, Brazil. The total height of the statue plus the pedestal is 27m.

In the location, there is a museum called House-Museum of Priest Cícero and a little church. The initial project predicted that the statue would be 27 meters high.. But, it was resized and built to be 30 meters high in total with the base. It was sculpted by Armando Lacerda in 1969, being inaugurated on November 1 of the same year by the then mayor José Mauro Castelo Branco Sampaio. Rômulo Ayres Montenegro was the engineer responsible for the engineering calculations for the base and the statue. It is one of the most visited spots in the city. From the statue it is possible to see the city and Chapada do Araripe. It is estimated that the monument receives around 2.5 million visitors a year.

== History and construction ==
The statue was not designed the way it is today from the beginning, several idealizations were made during its construction, increasing several times in size. Initially the statue was designed for a height of 7 meters, outside the base. However, during the making of the prototype, the plastic artist chose to increase the height to 12 meters, with this dimension the molds for the statue would have to be built separately, and that's what happened, they were made in separate parts in a shed, for later assembly and concreting at the final location, in the Serra do Horto. In the construction stage of modeling the statue, Armando also made the decision to resize it to a height of 17 meters, apart from the base. From then on, the need arose to make an engineering project for the base. At the time of construction, there was no technology for the molding process, being entirely handmade, the molds were made in wood and agave.

During its construction, the work was intense, reaching 24-hour shifts. Large blocks of concrete were fixed little by little, following the formation of the image. Large volumes of cement were used for the time, in a period characterized by a great shortage of production due to an economic crisis, even lacking in the Brazilian producing regions, forcing the mayor to seek the alternative of bringing material from Europe. The statue has just been built with Russian and Hungarian cement.

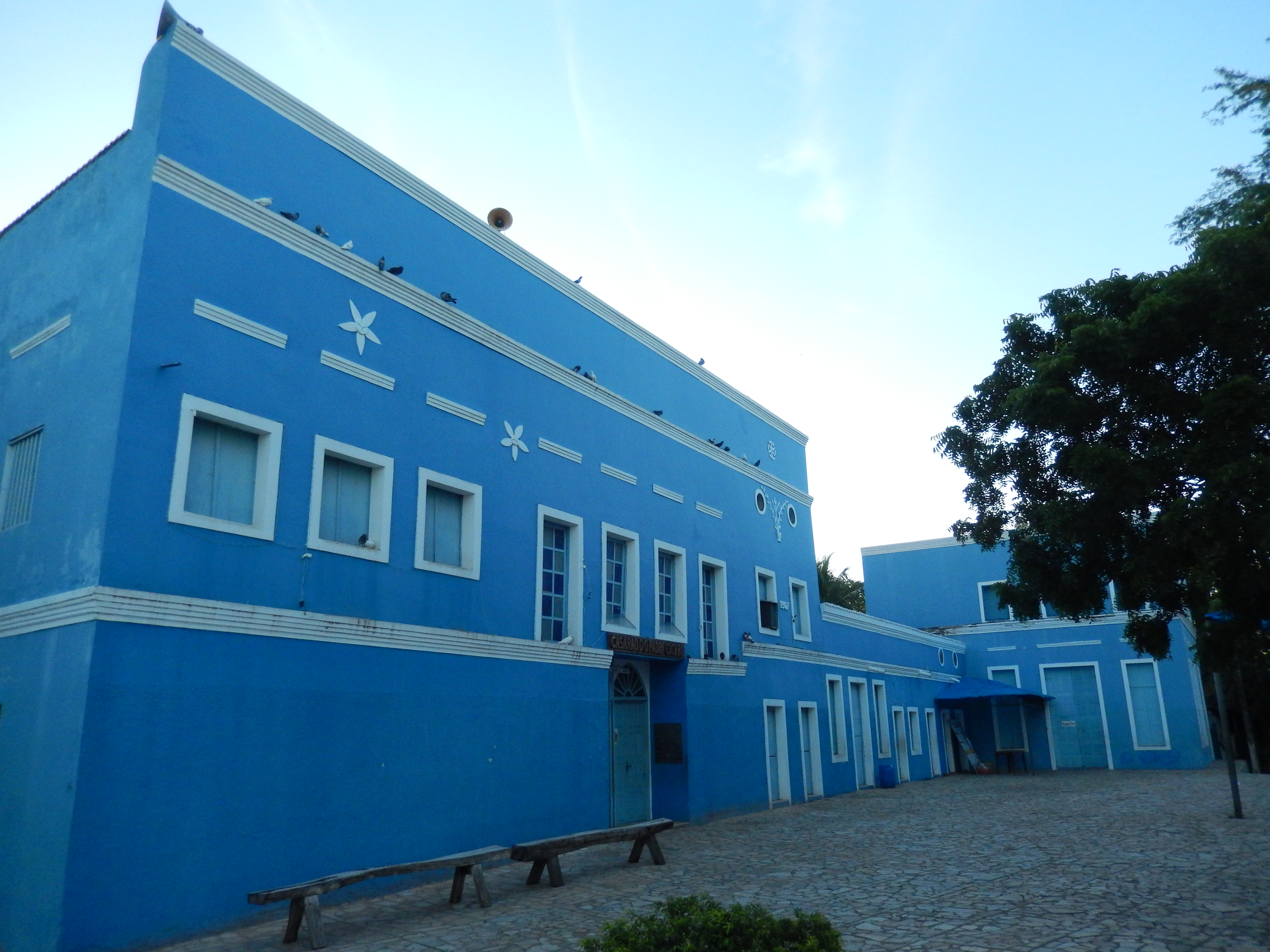
House Museum of Priest Cicero located near to the statue.

== Economy ==
Currently, the image can be seen from several locations in the region, being considered the main tourist spot in the city and the location of one of the most intense pilgrimages in Brazil. It is estimated that around 2.5 million people visit the monument each year. Thus becoming the main symbol of Cariri's religiosity.

On the road to the statue, there are several shops that sell miniature statues, religious images of patron saints, children's toys, and handcrafted decorative items. These stores are very important for small businesses and for the city's local economy. In addition to these stores, there are also some establishments such as restaurants and snack bars for visitors. The place and the climate collaborate for various cultural presentations, walks, breakfasts, diverse leisure moments among the population

=== Pilgrimage ===
The city of Juazeiro do Norte, where the statue is located, is considered the largest center of Catholicism in Latin America, being the second largest destination for pilgrimages after Aparecida (São Paulo). This fact contributed to the existence of the figure of Father Cícero in the region. Receiving the daily visit of thousands of pilgrims, faith is carried in trucks, macaw sticks and buses packed by the fervor of the blessed in the most sincere expression of religiosity. At the time of pilgrimages, the city is transformed with the reception of visitors in an amount greater than twice the number of inhabitants of the municipality.

The main pilgrimages in the city, two of them in honor of Father Cícero and his importance to the region, are:

- Pilgrimage of Santos Reis – January 06;
- Pilgrimage of São Sebastião – January 20;
- Pilgrimage of Candeias – February 02;
- Pilgrimage of Priest Cícero (birth) – March 24;
- Pilgrimage of Priest Cícero (demise)- July 20th;
- Pilgrimage of Nossa Senhora das Dores – September 15th;
- Pilgrimage of São Francisco – October 4th;
- Pilgrimage of Finados – November 02;
