= Veep (disambiguation) =

Veep is an American comedy television series.

Veep may also refer to:

- Vice president
- Veep Records, a defunct American music label (subsidiary of United Artists Records)
- Saint Veep, a sixth-century English saint

== See also ==
- St Veep, a village in Cornwall, England
