= VIP Music Records =

American music corporation

VIP Music Records.
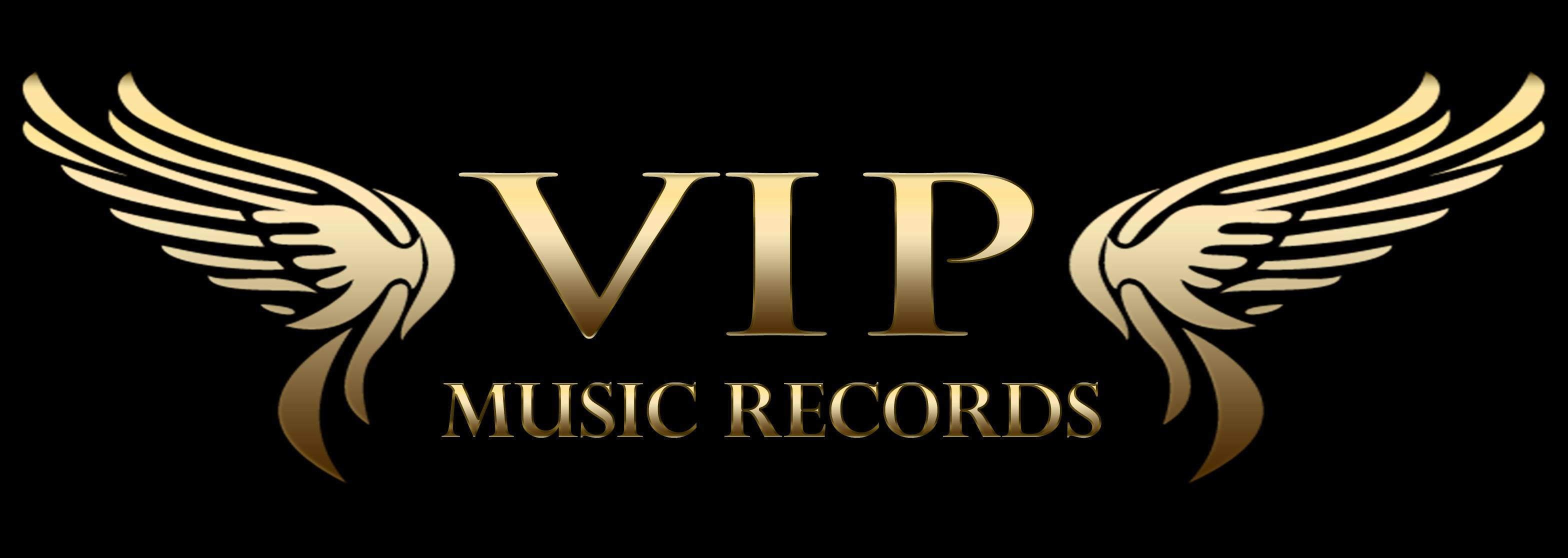
- Type: Private
- Industry: Music and entertainment
- Founded: 2009; 17 years ago
- Headquarters: New York, New York, United States
- Key people: Fabrizio Moreira: Chairman
- Website: vipmusicrecords.com

VIP Music Records is an American worldwide music corporation founded by Fabrizio Moreira that operates as a private company out of Brooklyn, New York. It claims to be the largest young music corporation for the Latin Market. VIP Music Records global corporate headquarters are in New York City, New York, United States.

In August 2018, Brooklyn-based record label VIP Music Records launched a platform called Secret Hit Music. The platform gathers a team that combines the intuition of new talent and producers with songwriters.

== Current artists ==
Act	Year signed
Macabro XII (Rapper)	2010
Padrino el Negociante (Producer)	2014
Frank el Santo (Latin singer)	2014
Jack el Mago (Producer)	2014
Melman (Producer)	2014
Shorty Enigma (Latin Singer)	2015
TheTrueMoJo (Rapper)	2015
SkidZ (rapper)	2016
Ifeatu Obianwu (Rapper)	2016
Gustavo Pozo F	2017
D. Watkins	2021

Former artists

Act
King Krucial (Rapper)
Gwap Getta Music (Hip hop trio)
Fraag Malas (Pop Singer)
Dayz Rich (Rapper)

== Discography ==
Artist	Album	Album details	Singles
NK	Lollipop	Released: February 14, 2020	Lollipop
Jacob Forever	Miami	Released: January 24, 2020	Miami
Tech N9ne	Powerlines	Released: August 2, 2019	PowerLines
Gustavo Pozo F	Extempore	Released: May 19, 2017	For Those Rainy Days (Intro instrumental); Happy Sad Story On Christmas Eve; Blue Deep Love; When I; Nicole
Short Enigma	De Fiesta	Released: November 30, 2015	Fiesta; Bailame Asi; La Botella; Tu Mejor Opcion
Macabro XII	El Hijo de Alida	Released: June 5, 2014	intro; yo soy Dios; Hija; El Hijo de Alida; Conoces A; Fumare; Belleza tu; Mi Rap; Mayores de; No es seriecito; Amor a primer oido; Camino a la cima; Famas Lokas; Mujeres de 13; Fue un placer; con tu corazon puedes volar
Frank el Santo	Pa' que no pequen tanto	Released: June 5, 2014	Un Sueño; Nadie Sabe; Seria un placer; Decidete; Mi Bendicion; Coqueteo; Nadie como tu; Ella; Tu me gustas; Te deseo; Que haces con el
TheTrueMoJo	Dreams 2 Reality	Released: December 15, 2015	Legendary ft. Souljaboy; 4 a dollar; Count up my check; On the cam; Bitch Work; Put in the work; Racks and lean
