= VIP's (American restaurant) =

Former American restaurant chain

VIP's Restaurants
- Industry: Restaurants
- Founded: 1968
- Defunct: c. 1989
- Fate: Closed
- Headquarters: Salem, Oregon, United States
- Number of locations: 53 restaurants (1982)
- Area served: Five states in the Western U.S.
- Revenue: $41.3 million (1981)
- Net income: $984,500 (1981)
- Number of employees: 2,500 (1982)

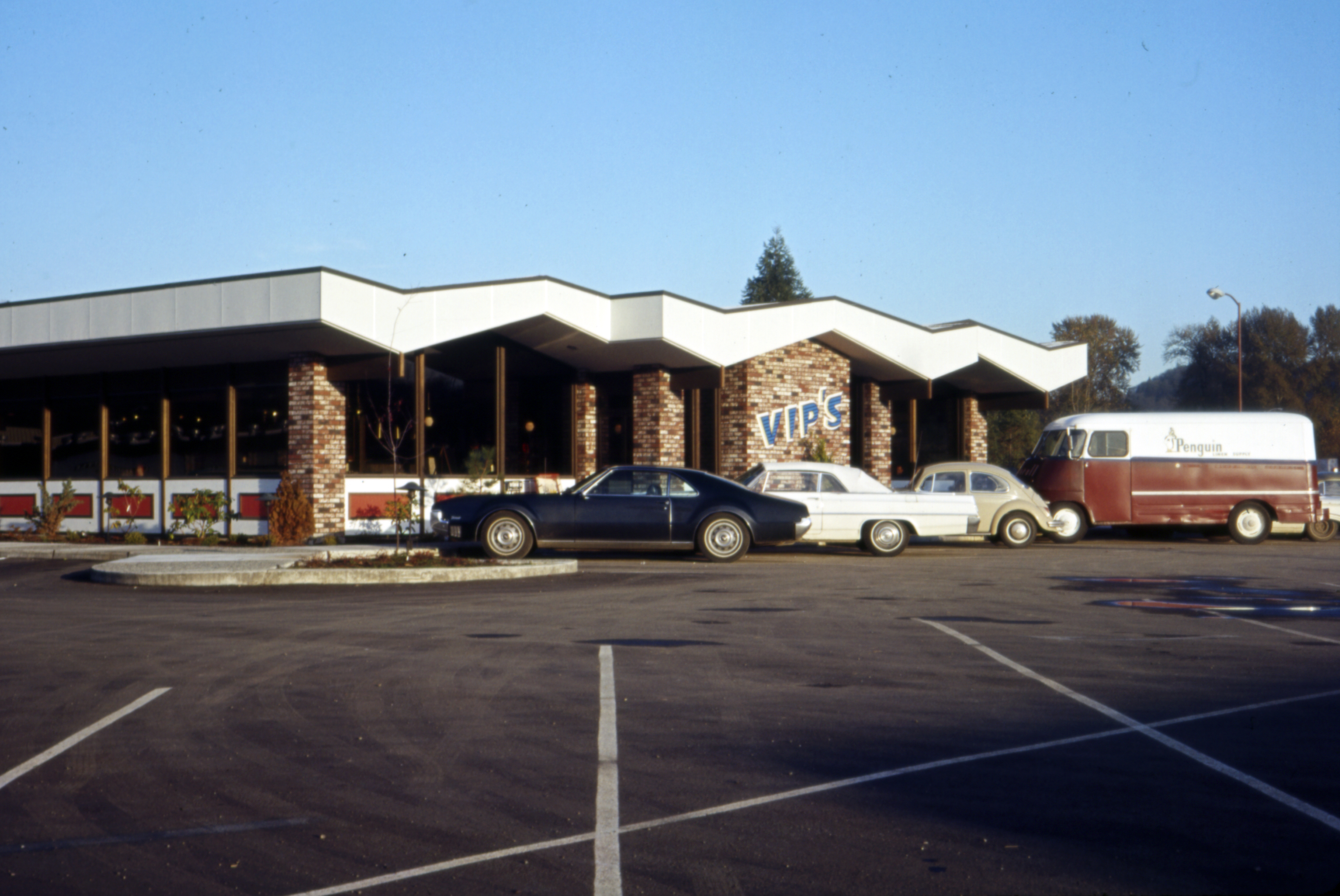
A VIP's Restaurant in Tukwila, Washington, in 1970

VIP's, alternatively written Vip's, was a restaurant chain in the Western United States that operated from 1968 until the late 1980s, based in Salem, Oregon. With more than 50 locations, it was once the largest restaurant chain based in Oregon. It was a Denny's-style restaurant, a type that was commonly known at that time as a "coffee shop" but is now more commonly known as a casual dining restaurant. Most restaurants were located near freeways and were open 24 hours. At its peak, the chain had locations in five states: Oregon, Washington, Idaho, Nevada and northern California.

== History ==
The first VIP's Restaurant was opened in 1968, in Tualatin, Oregon, next to an Interstate 5 freeway interchange. A second restaurant was opened the same year, in Salem, in a location not near a freeway. It was not as profitable as the Tualatin location, and consequently the company's owners decided that future restaurants should be placed along freeways. By 1969, the chain was expanding outside Oregon, with two VIP's under construction in Seattle, and by late 1971 it had grown to 15 restaurants. The company, founded by Keith Andler and Robert Smith, was named VIP's Restaurants, Inc. By 1982, the company was operating 53 VIP's coffee-shop-style restaurants and had also opened four Mexican restaurants that had other names, including La Casa Real and Tortilla Machine. Together, the 57 restaurants had gross sales of more than $41 million in 1981. At its peak, VIP's was the largest restaurant chain based in Oregon.

In 1982, the company sold 35 of its 53 VIP's Restaurants to Denny's Inc. for around $12 million. The offer from Denny's was "too good to pass up", VIPs' owners told The Oregonian newspaper, including a promise that all employees at the affected restaurants would keep their jobs and be absorbed by Denny's. The 1982 sale covered 19 locations in Washington and 16 in Oregon and Northern California.

In 1984, VIP's sold 16 restaurants to JB's Restaurants, of Salt Lake City. This sale, of eight locations in Oregon (including the original Tualatin location) and eight in Washington, left the company with just nine restaurants.

By 1989, the last VIP's Restaurants had been sold, and the company had branched out into the hotel business. Renamed VIP's Industries Inc., the company continued to own a few Tex-Mex restaurants, using the name La Casa Real and mostly located in the Portland–Vancouver metropolitan area but with ones also in Fife, Washington, and Salem. The entire six-restaurant La Casa Real chain was sold in December 1994 to Chevy's, which was expanding rapidly in the Portland metropolitan area at that time. Earlier, VIP's Industries had opened a chain of hotels, Phoenix Inn (later: Phoenix Inn Suites), which was targeted at business travelers and had six locations in the Portland metropolitan area, including one in Vancouver, Washington. Based in Wilsonville, Oregon, Phoenix Inn was a subsidiary of VIP's Industries. However, in 2006 VIP's sold the hotel chain, which had grown to 13 hotels in Oregon, Washington, and Arizona, to a joint venture whose owners planned to continue operating it under the Phoenix Inn Suites name.

== See also ==
- List of pancake houses
