= VIP Records =

Record store chain from California, US

VIP Records is a record store chain from South Central Los Angeles, California. It was founded in 1967 by Cletus Anderson (April 5, 1941 – January 28, 2024), and at its height had fourteen locations across the Los Angeles area.

The Long Beach location opened in 1978 and is currently managed by Kelvin Anderson.

== History ==
=== Founding and expansion (1960s–1970s) ===
VIP Records was founded in 1967 by Cletus Anderson, a Mississippi native who relocated to Los Angeles. Before entering the music business, Anderson worked as a painter for companies such as Honeywell, McDonnell Douglas, and General Motors. He opened Triple B Dry Cleaners.

The first VIP Records store opened at 108th Street and Broadway in South Central Los Angeles, eventually expanding to fourteen stores in Southern California, specifically in cities with a growing Black community: in Inglewood, Pasadena, Compton, and Crenshaw. The business also included three wholesale distribution locations—Robot Records, Magic Disc, and Music Merchandisers—as well as two in-house record labels, Magic Disc Records and Saturn Records.

In 1982, VIP’s Saturn Records released Ice-T’s debut single, “The Coldest Rap.”

=== Long Beach location and hip-hop influence (1980s–1990s) ===
In 1978, Anderson opened a VIP Records location in Long Beach, California. His brother Kelvin, who had been working in the business for several years, bought the Long Beach store from Cletus in early 1979.

During the 1980s, as gang violence increased in Long Beach, particularly between the Bloods and Crips, Kelvin Anderson converted a section of the store into a recording studio. Music producer Sir Jinx, a cousin of Dr. Dre, assisted in upgrading the studio’s equipment, introducing the Emu SP-1200 sampling drum machine. The studio became a hub for hip-hop trio 213 (Snoop Dogg, his cousin Nate Dogg, and friend Warren G), who recorded their first four-song demo at VIP. Anderson shopped the demo at record labels Jive, Tommy Boy, Profile, and Priority without success.

Other artists and groups associated with VIP Records include DJ Quik, The Dogg Pound, Domino, The Twinz, Dove Shack, and Tha Eastsidaz.

In 1993, Snoop Dogg filmed part of the music video for his debut single, “Who Am I (What’s My Name)?” on the VIP store rooftop.

=== Decline and reinvention (2000s–Present) ===
VIP in Long Beach is now the last remaining location and has undergone several downsizings and moves over the years. Still owned and operated by Kelvin Anderson, business began to decline in the early 2000s, coinciding with the rise of music streaming services such as iTunes. By 2012, the Long Beach store, which had been located on Pacific Coast Highway since 1978, downsized to a smaller space in the same strip mall. The larger, 3,300-square-foot location was vacated and replaced by a beauty supply wholesaler.

In 2018, VIP Records underwent a significant reinvention with the launch of VIP Create Space. The new 3,200-square-foot venture sought to support local musicians and businessmen.

Cletus Robret Anderson, the founder of VIP Records, died from gallbladder cancer on January 28, 2024.

=== Influence on music and culture ===
The stores regularly hosted "in-store" promotional events where major artists, including The Jacksons, Rick James, Stevie Wonder, and James Brown, met with fans.

VIP popularized the practice of using live DJs in its stores, with Kelvin Anderson instructing DJs to read the energy of customers and tailor music selections.

VIP Records in Long Beach is recognized as the birthplace of G-funk, a subgenre of hip-hop that blended funk elements with smooth, melodic production. G-funk’s distinctive style, characterized by slow-tempo beats and melodic synthesizers, became a defining sound of West Coast hip-hop, contrasting with the faster, more aggressive style of East Coast hip-hop.

VIP Long Beach has been featured in multiple music videos, including: Who Am I (What's My Name?)" (1993) by Snoop Dogg and "G'd Up" by Tha Eastsidaz (1999). The VIP sign has also appeared in Welcome to Atlanta (Coast 2 Coast Remix) by Jermaine Dupri featuring Snoop Dogg (2002), I'm from Long Beach by Snoop Dogg (2015), the Warren G documentary G Funk (2017), and HBO's The Defiant Ones (2017).

== Long Beach location sign ==
The VIP Records sign at the Long Beach location originally belonged to Whistler Liquor, the business that preceded VIP, and featured a whistling man. The sign was repurposed in 1978 when Cletus Anderson opened the Long Beach store.

It was further customized by his brother, Kelvin Anderson, who took ownership in 1979. Using the existing structure as a base, Kelvin redesigned it to reflect the identity of VIP Records, adding a black vinyl record at the center and installing blinking neon lights to create a spinning effect. In the mid-1990s, as the store gained international recognition, Anderson added the words "World Famous" and changed the skin tone of the whistling man from white to black.

=== Landmark status and controversy ===
In 2015, Anderson attempted to auction the sign on eBay, with bids quickly surpassing $170,000. However, at the urging of city officials, he removed the listing to explore options for preserving the landmark locally. Unbeknownst to Anderson, an application to designate the sign as a historic landmark had been submitted, a move made possible by the 2015 Historic Preservation Ordinance, a Long Beach law allowing any interested party to apply for landmark status without the owner's consent.

In 2016, a city-commissioned study confirmed the sign’s cultural and historical significance, concluding that it was eligible for landmark status. However, tensions between Anderson and the building’s owner, Offer Grinwald, led to delays in the process.

In 2017, Anderson launched a petition to preserve the sign for an African-American arts and music museum, but upon learning that landmarking had moved forward without his involvement, he pivoted to opposing what he called the “illegal preservation” of the sign.

In May 2017, the City of Long Beach allocated $80,000 to restore and landmark the sign, with the condition that Anderson complete the restoration within two years and keep the sign in Long Beach. Around the same time, controversy arose when it was announced that a 7-Eleven would replace the original VIP Records storefront. The news led to community pushback, including a petition opposing the convenience store’s opening. Negotiations between VIP Records and 7-Eleven followed, with the chain initially agreeing to incorporate elements reflecting the store’s historical significance and contribute to local community initiatives. However, the deal fell through in September 2017, and Anderson ultimately decided to remove the sign rather than have it remain above a 7-Eleven.

In December 2017, the Long Beach City Council voted unanimously to grant the sign historic landmark status. Despite this designation, Anderson moved forward with relocating the sign, emphasizing the importance of preserving its cultural significance on his own terms.

=== Museum initiative ===
In March 2025, Anderson announced plans to convert the store into a museum and educational center. He formally unveiled the museum initiative.

The museum aims to showcase the role of Black music in shaping hip-hop culture, featuring historical artifacts such as plaques, awards, and photos of renowned artists who visited the store. Additionally, it will include an educational component to teach visitors about the music industry and the impact of independent record stores.

The City of Long Beach has expressed support for the project, with Mayor Rex Richardson emphasizing its cultural and historical importance. As part of a broader revitalization initiative known as Elevate 28, which aims to highlight Long Beach landmarks ahead of the 2028 Summer Olympics, the city has allocated funding to refurbish VIP Records' sign. Plans are underway to relocate the sign to public property near the store, transforming it into a tourist attraction and a sustainable funding source for the museum.
