= VIPs (film) =

2010 film directed by Toniko Melo

- Directed by: Toniko Melo
- Written by: Thiago Dottori; Bráulio Mantovani
- Based on: VIPs - Histórias Reais de um Mentiroso by Mariana Caltabiano
- Produced by: Bel Berlinck; Fernando Meirelles; Paulo Morelli
- Starring: Wagner Moura; Gisele Fróes; Emiliano Ruschel; Marcela Falci; Heitor Goldflus
- Cinematography: Mauro Pinheiro Jr.
- Edited by: Gustavo Giani
- Music by: Antonio Pinto
- Production companies: Focus Features International; O2 Filmes
- Distributed by: Universal Pictures International
- Release dates: September 25, 2010 (Festival do Rio); March 25, 2011 (Brazil)
- Country: Brazil
- Language: Portuguese

VIPs is a 2010 Brazilian drama film directed by Toniko Melo, based on the book VIPs - Histórias Reais de um Mentiroso by Mariana Caltabiano, about Marcelo Nascimento da Rocha, a criminal who was famous for impersonating several people, among them one of the owners of the Gol airline and one of the leaders of the PCC criminal faction.

It is the first film of Toniko Melo alone in the direction. His other film, Som e Fúria (2008), was directed in partnership with Fernando Meirelles, which is one of the producers of VIPs. The film was exhibited at the Festival do Rio and won four awards, including best picture.

== Plot ==
The film tells the story of Marcelo da Rocha (Wagner Moura), a man who as a child loved to imitate people. He lives in the state of Paraná with his mother, a hairdresser, and his great dream is to learn to fly and become a pilot like his father.

Marcelo runs away from home and travels to Mato Grosso do Sul. There, he starts working in a hangar, learning to fly airplanes and soon begin working with contraband, always assuming new identities. After getting a lot of money, Marcelo prepares for the biggest coup of his life: posing by businessman Henrique Constantino, brother of the owner of Gol airline.

He disembarks in a resort in Recife and convinces all the VIPs of the party for a few days that is the real Henrique. Except for the millionaire Sandra, who knows his secret, but let herself be seduced by him. All goes well until Marcelo gives an interview on TV, being unmasked and forced to escape.

== Cast ==
- Wagner Moura as Marcelo Nascimento da Rocha "Bizarro"
  - João Francisco Tottene as Marcelo da Rocha (child)
- Gisele Fróes as Silvia
- Jorge D'Elía as Boss
- Emiliano Ruschel as Fausto
- Roger Gobeth as Renato Jacques
- Juliano Cazarré as Baña
- Arieta Corrêa as Sandra
- Norival Rizzo as Father of Marcelo
- Amaury Jr. as Amaury Jr.
- Marisol Ribeiro as Resort lady

== Accolades ==
The film won the 2010 Festival do Rio in the categories of best film, best actor, best supporting actor and best supporting actress. In addition, it participated in the Mostra de São Paulo, Show Búzios, Festival de Vitória and the Mostra de Cinema de Tiradentes.
