= Carol Duarte =

Brazilian actress (born 1991)

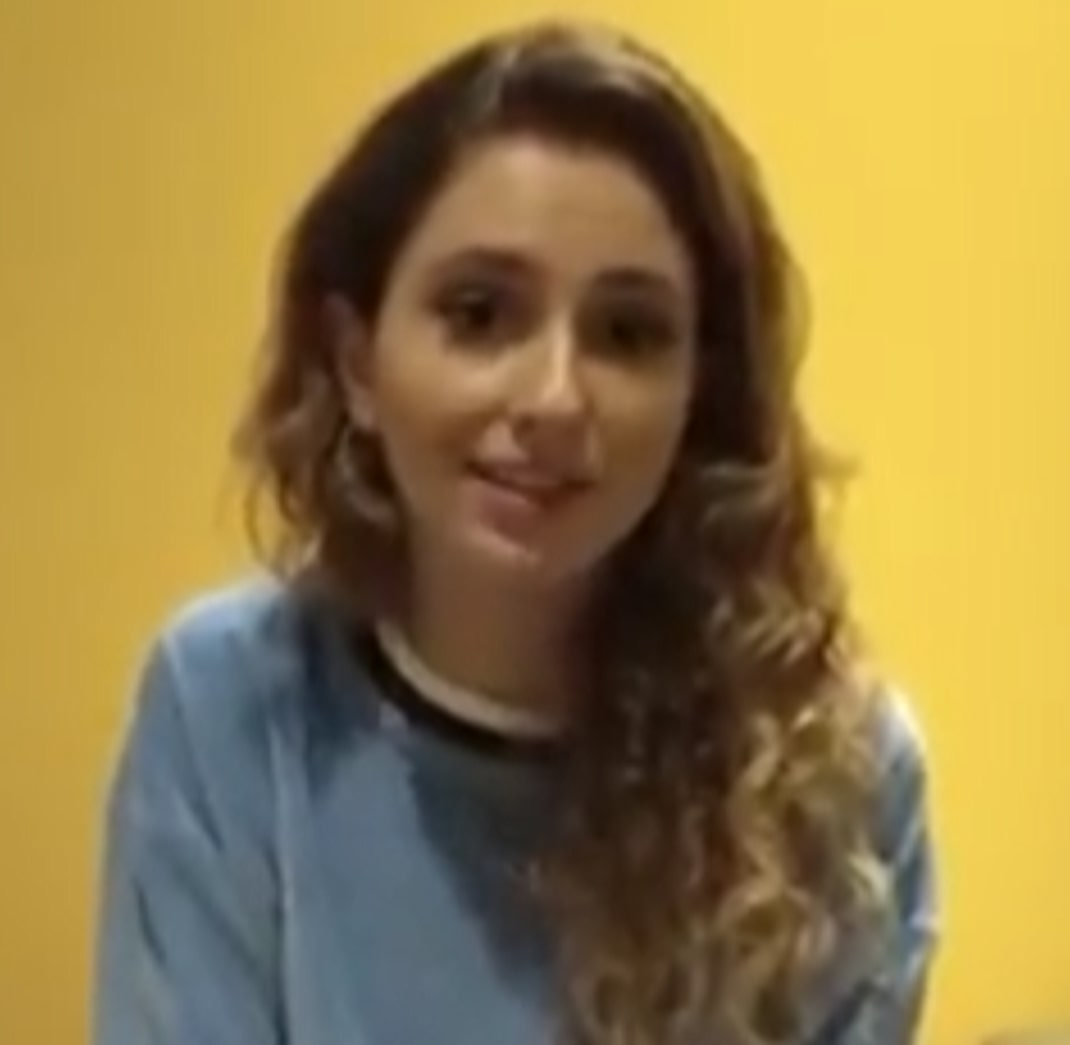
- Duarte in 2017
- Born: Carolina da Cunha Duarte; 10 July 1991 (age 34); São Paulo, Brazil
- Occupation: Actress
- Years active: 2008–present

Caroline da Cunha Duarte (born 10 July 1991), better known as simply Carol Duarte, is a Brazilian actress. She has won various awards, including an APCA award, an Extra Award, and a Platino Award, along with nominations for the Grande Otelo award and the Guarani Prize.

Duarte made her debut on television with the 2017 soap A Força do Querer where she played Ivan Garcia, a transgender character. Her performance was critically acclaimed and made her well known in Brazil. For her role, she received an APCA award and APCA Best Television Actress, among many other "Best New Actress" awards from various organizations.

She received acclaim again in 2019 for her award-winning performance as the titular character in The Invisible Life of Eurídice Gusmão, a role she shared with Fernanda Montenegro. Duarte received praise from film critics and was awarded again with the APCA prize for Best Film Actress and with a Platino Award for Best Actress. She also was awarded the Grande Prêmio do Cinema Brasileiro and a critics' nomination for the Guarani Prize for Best New Actress.

== Biography ==
Duarte is the child of Maria Ivete da Cunha Duarte and Romeu Duarte. She was born on 10 July 1991 in São Paulo, but spent most of her childhood in São Bernardo do Campo. At 15, she began studying theatre at workshops offered by cities in the ABC Paulista region. After she briefly studied at SP Escola de Teatro, she was accepted into the School of Dramatic Arts at the University of São Paulo.

She has performed in works such as Angustia, (2014) directed by Luciene Guedes, A Visita da Velha Senhora, directed by Celso Frateschi (2015), and O Alvo, directed by Pedro Garrafa (2015). In 2016, she was cast, in São Paulo, as one of the protagonists of As Siamesas — Talvez eu Desmaie no Front, directed by Fernanda Camargo, Carolina Bianchi and Felipe Rocha.

At the beginning of 2017, she was selected after an intense casting process to act in "A Força do Querer" by Rede Globo, during which she lived in Rio de Janeiro. In the show, written by Glória Perez, she plays the role of Ivan Garcia, a boy from a rich family who discovers he is transgender. The role, which was received well publicly, also led Duarte to become an active voice for LGBT rights, as it also came to public knowledge that she was in a relationship with another woman.

She next was cast in a role for a show by Manuela Dias, set to be released in 2019, but it ended up being rearranged by director Rogério Gomes as she was to act in the show "O Sétimo Guardião", written by Agnaldo Silva, where she plays Stefânia.

In 2019, she returned to Rio to star in the film The Invisible Life of Eurídice Gusmão by Karim Aïnouz. In this film, she worked with people such as Fernanda Montenegro and Gregório Duvivier. In May of the same year, the film was selected by the 2019 Cannes Film Festival to win the Un certain regard award. As a result of the movie, she was nominated for 6 awards as best actress and won 3, among them the Platino Awards as best film actress.

In 2020, Duarte was in the short film Missão Perséfone, a 2021 film directed by Aïnouz, in the short Chão de Fábrica, by Nina Kopko, which showed the lunch hour of four metallurgists, with her playing the role of the operator Renata.

In 2022, she was selected to play a role in La Chimera by Alice Rohwacher, playing the role of Italia, acting alongside international actors such as Josh O'Connor and Isabella Rossellini. The same year she took part in the film Malu, directed by Pedro Freire, about the life of actress Malu Rocha, his mother. In 2023, she returned to the theatre stage and acted in two plays: From May to November in the special Babilônia Tropical – A Nostalgia do Açúcar as Anna Paes, the owner of the Engenho of Casa Forte, in the North Zone of Recife. From November to December, she had her first solo role in A Visita, a play about a woman confined to her apartment during a global pandemic, confronting an illness in the collective psyche.

== Personal life ==
In 2017, the media revealed that Duarte is a lesbian. She is a self-described feminist and leftist and is known for her social and political activism.

In October 2018, she denounced criticisms and lesbophobic remarks she has received in the past, mainly online, on the Jovem Pan radio show "Morning Show".

She lives with her girlfriend Aline Klein, with whom she has been in a relationship since 2014.

== Filmography ==
=== Television ===
Year	Title	Role	Notes
2017	A Força do Querer	Ivan Garcia / Ivana Garcia	
2018	O Sétimo Guardião	Stefânia	
2019	Segunda Chamada	Solange Resende	Episode: "8 de outubro"

=== Film ===
Year	Title	Role	Notes
2015	32 Dentes	Natália	Short film
2019	The Invisible Life of Eurídice Gusmão	Eurídice Gusmão (young)	
2020	Missão Persefone	Scientist	Short Film
2021	Chão de Fábrica	Renata	Short Film
2023	La chimera	Italia	
2024	Malu	Joana	

=== Internet ===
Year	Title	Role	Notes
2012	Lilian e a Arte de Ser Desagradável	Amanda	
2021	L e Q	Herself	Digital series

== Theatre ==
Year	Title	Role
2008	Surpresa	Calara
2008	As Preciosas Ridículas	Mari
2009	Bang! Bang! Você Morreu	Diana
2009	De Romeu e Julieta Todo Mundo Tem um Pouco	Julieta
2009	1/4	Suzy
2010	Geração 80	Wanda
2011	Viva o Povo Brasileiro	Ernestina
2011	A Gaivota	Nayara
2011	Ópera na Vila	Vanessa
2012	Otello	Emília
2013	Meio Tom Dá, Meio Tom Cá	
2013–14	O Quarto Rosa	Isis
2013	A Mim Também Dói	
2013	Catalise	
2013	Cinzas às Cinzas	
2014	Ensaio sob(re) Angústia	Margot
2015	A Visita da Velha Senhora	Helena
2015	O Alvo	Rebeca
2015	O Que a Dorothy Quer?	Dorothy
2016	As Siamesas: Talvez Eu Desmaie no Front	Carmem
2023	Babilônia Tropical – A Nostalgia do Açúcar	Anna Paes
2023	A Visita	Mulher confinada

== Awards and nominations ==
Year	Award	Category	Nomination	Result
2017	Melhores do Ano	New Actress	A Força do Querer	Won
2017	Prêmio APCA de Televisão	Best Actress	A Força do Querer	Nominated
2017	Prêmio Contigo! Online	Best New Actress	A Força do Querer	Won
2017	Troféu UOL TV e Famosos	Best Actress	A Força do Querer	Nominated
2017	Troféu UOL TV e Famosos	New TV Actress (Critics)	A Força do Querer	Won
2017	Prêmio F5	New Actress of the Year	A Força do Querer	Won
2017	Melhores do Ano NaTelinha	New Actor/Actress	A Força do Querer	Won
2017	Melhores do Ano Minha Novela	New Actress	A Força do Querer	Won
2018	Troféu Internet	New Actress of the Year	A Força do Querer	Nominated
2018	Prêmio Extra de Televisão	New Female Actress	A Força do Querer	Won
2018	Prêmio Geração Glamour	New Actress	A Força do Querer	Won
2018	Capricho Awards	National Artist	A Força do Querer	Nominated
2019	Troféu APCA	Best Film Actress	The Invisible Life of Eurídice Gusmão	Won
2020	Platino Awards	Best Actress	The Invisible Life of Eurídice Gusmão	Won
2020	Valladolid International Film Festival	Best Actress	The Invisible Life of Eurídice Gusmão	Won
2020	Prêmio Guarani do Cinema Brasileiro	New Female Actress	The Invisible Life of Eurídice Gusmão	Nominated
2020	Grande Prêmio do Cinema Brasileiro	Best New Actress	The Invisible Life of Eurídice Gusmão	Nominated
2020	Festival Sesc Melhores Filmes	Best National Actress	The Invisible Life of Eurídice Gusmão	Nominated
2022	Prêmio Biscoito	Protagonist	The Invisible Life of Eurídice Gusmão	Won
2023	Chicago International Film Festival	Best Cast Performance	La chimera	Won
2024	Rio de Janeiro International Film Festival	Best Supporting Actress	Malu	Won
2025	Platino Awards	Best Supporting Actress	Malu	Pending
