= Hélène Louvart =

French cinematographer

Hélène Louvart (AFC)
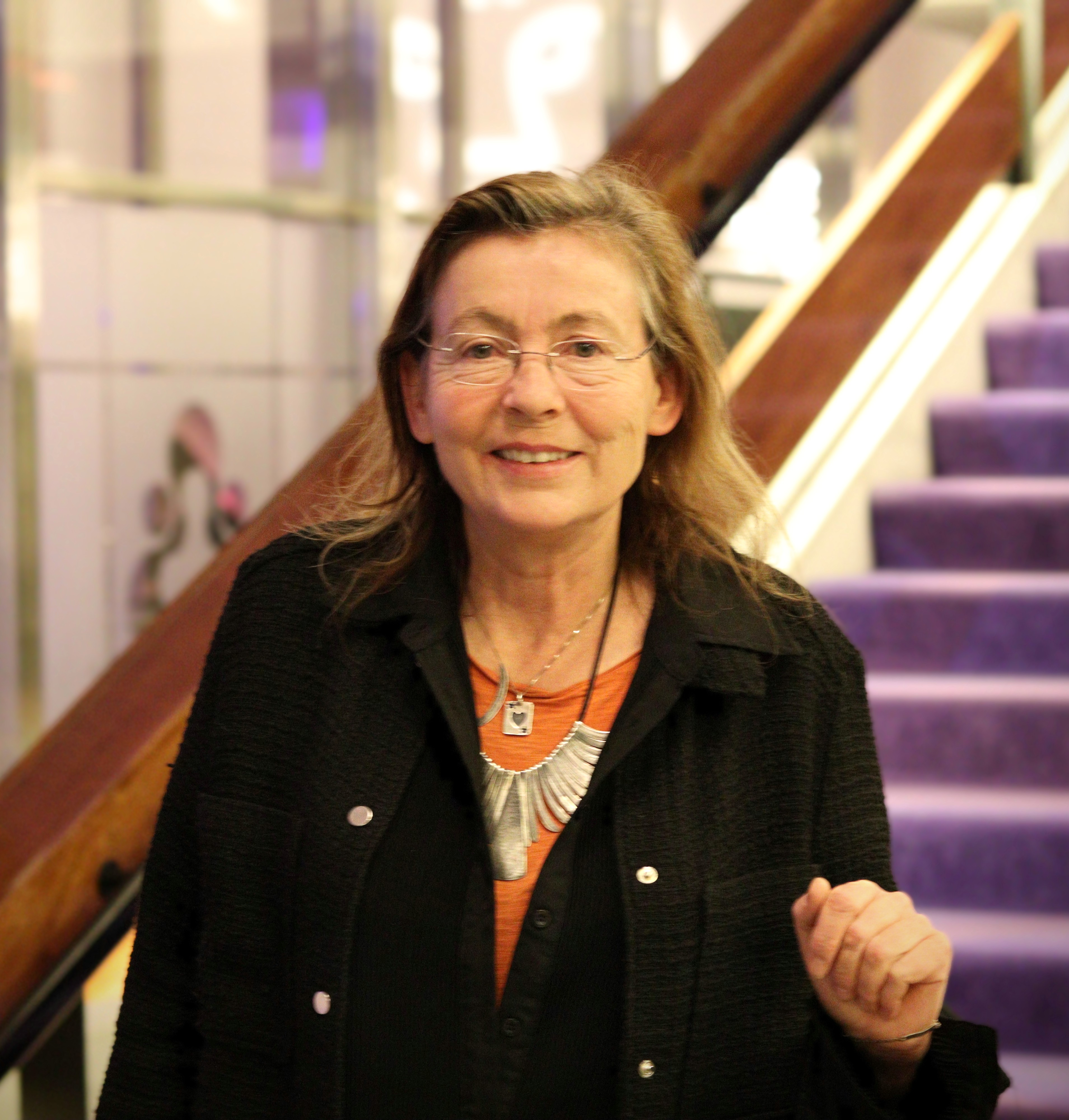
- Louvart at the IFFR 2023
- Born: September 2, 1964 (age 62); Pontarlier, Doubs, France
- Occupation: Cinematographer
- Years active: 1987–present
- Organization: French Society of Cinematographers
- Website: http://helenelouvart.free.fr

Hélène Louvart (born September 2, 1964) is a French cinematographer. Most known for her work with Alice Rohrwacher and Karim Aïnouz.

She is a member of French Society of Cinematographers (AFC).

== Life and career ==
She graduated in 1985 from the prestigious École nationale supérieure Louis-Lumière in Paris. The graduates are actively sought by film producers, consistently rank in the top echelon of French cinema professionals. In keeping with the College's reputation for producing masters of their craft, Louvart's first hire on a feature film came immediately after graduation with the post of cinematographer in 1986.

In addition to cinematography, she has also directed four short films.

In 2008, Louvart was cinematographer on Petit indi, shot entirely on 35 mm, which was nominated in the Best Cinematography (Millor Fotografia) category for the 2010 Gaudí Awards. Known in Catalan as Premis Gaudí, the Gaudi Awards are Catalonia's main national film awards, established in 2009 by Acadèmia del Cinema Català (Catalan Academy of Cinema).

For her extensive body of work and artistic excellence, Louvart received The WIFTS Foundation 2012 Cinematographer Award.

== Filmography ==
=== Film ===
Year	Title	Director	Notes
1987	Cœurs croisés	Stéphanie de Mareuil	
1990	Printemps perdu	Alain Mazard	
1993	Ce que femme veut...	Gérard Jumel	
1995	Souviens-toi de moi	Zaïda Ghorab-Volta	With Emmanuelle Le Fur
1995	Oui	Pascal Perennes	
1996	Will It Snow for Christmas?	Sandrine Veysset	
1997	Je ne vois pas ce qu'on me trouve	Christian Vincent	
1997	Nuits blanches	Sophie Deflandre	
1997	L'Autre Côté de la mer	Dominique Cabrera	
1998	La vie sauve	Alain Raoust	
1998	Victor... pendant qu'il est trop tard	Sandrine Veysset	
1999	Nadia and the Hippos	Dominique Cabrera	
1999	La Voleuse de Saint-Lubin	Claire Devers	
2000	Paris, mon petit corps est bien las de ce grand monde	Françoise Prenant	
2000	Le Harem de Madame Osmane	Nadir Moknèche	
2000	Sauve-moi	Christian Vincent	
2000	Paria	Nicolas Klotz	
2001	Pau and His Brother	Marc Recha	
2001	Martha… Martha	Sandrine Veysset	
2001	The Milk of Human Kindness	Dominique Cabrera	
2002	A Piece of Sky	Bénédicte Liénard	
2002	La Cage	Alain Raoust	
2003	Where Is Madame Catherine?	Marc Recha	
2003	Raja	Jacques Doillon	
2004	A Wonderful Spell	Dominique Cabrera	
2004	In the Battlefields	Danielle Arbid	
2004	La blessure	Nicolas Klotz	
2004	Ma Mère	Christophe Honoré	
2004	The Last Day	Rodolphe Marconi	
2005	Les Enfants	Christian Vincent	
2006	Four Stars	Christian Vincent	
2006	Il sera une fois...	Sandrine Veysset	
2006	Jours d'août	Marc Recha	
2006	Les Ambitieux	Catherine Corsini	With Guillaume Schiffman
2007	Pas douce	Jeanne Waltz	
2007	L'Homme qui marche	Aurélia Georges	
2008	Le Premier venu	Jacques Doillon	
2008	Salamandra	Pablo Agüero	
2009	Lignes de front	Jean-Christophe Klotz	
2009	Petit Indi	Marc Recha	
2010	Toutes les filles pleurent	Judith Godrèche	
2010	Copacabana	Marc Fitoussi	
2010	Im Alter von Ellen	Pia Marais	
2011	À bas bruit	Judith Abitbol	Shared credit with Judith Abitbol and Laurent Coltelloni
2011	Heavenly Body	Alice Rohrwacher	
2011	Low Life	Nicolas Klotz	
2011	Bye Bye Blondie	Virginie Despentes	
2012	L'Âge atomique	Héléna Klotz	
2012	When I Saw You	Annemarie Jacir	
2012	Goodbye Morocco	Nadir Moknèche	
2013	Les Apaches	Thierry de Peretti	
2014	The Wonders	Alice Rohrwacher	
2014	Xenia	Panos H. Koutras	With Simos Sarketzis
2014	The Smell of Us	Larry Clark	
2015	Arianna	Carlo Lavagna	
2015	Parisienne	Danielle Arbid	
2015	Un dia perfecte per volar	Marc Recha	
2015	Miracolul din Tekir	Ruxandra Zenide	
2015	Spectrographies	Smith	With Josée Deshaies
2016	D'une pierre deux coups	Fejria Deliba	
2016	Dark Night	Tim Sutton	
2016	Il nido	Klaudia Reynicke	
2016	Rosemari	Sara Johnsen	With Erik Wilson
2016	L'Histoire d'une mère	Sandrine Veysset	
2017	Beach Rats	Eliza Hittman	
2017	Barrage	Laura Schroeder	
2017	The Intruder	Leonardo Di Costanzo	
2017	La vida lliure	Marc Recha	
2018	Petra	Jaime Rosales	
2018	Happy as Lazzaro	Alice Rohrwacher	
2018	Familia sumergida	María Alché	
2018	Maya	Mia Hansen-Løve	
2019	The Invisible Life of Eurídice Gusmão	Karim Aïnouz	
2019	Rocks	Sarah Gavron	
2020	Never Rarely Sometimes Always	Eliza Hittman	
2020	All the Dead Ones	Marco Dutra; Caetano Gotardo	
2020	Sous le ciel d'Alice	Chloé Mazlo	
2021	Murina	Antoneta Alamat Kusijanović	
2021	The Lost Daughter	Maggie Gyllenhaal	
2022	Nobody's Hero	Alain Guiraudie	
2022	Mother and Son	Léonor Serraille	
2022	Nezouh	Soudade Kaadan	With Burak Kanbir
2022	Wild Flowers	Jaime Rosales	
2023	Disco Boy	Giacomo Abbruzzese	
2023	Firebrand	Karim Aïnouz	
2023	La chimera	Alice Rohrwacher	
2023	Puan	María Alché; Benjamín Naishtat	
2024	Motel Destino	Karim Aïnouz	
2024	The Salt Path	Marianne Elliott	
2024	Reading Lolita in Tehran	Eran Riklis	
2025	Eleanor the Great	Scarlett Johansson	
2025	Romería	Carla Simón	
2025	Palestine 36	Annemarie Jacir	With Sarah Blum and Tim Fleming
2026	Rosebush Pruning	Karim Aïnouz	
2026	Call Me Queen	Emily Atef	
TBA	To Make Ends Meat	Luna Carmoon	Post-production
TBA	Love Is Not the Answer	Michael Cera	Post-production
TBA	The Three Incestuous Sisters	Alice Rohrwacher	Post-production
TBA	The Wolf Will Tear Your Immaculate Hands	Nathalie Álvarez Mesén	Post-production

Documentary film

Year	Title	Director	Notes
1991	Les chroniques de l'île du roi boiteux (n°1: Pâques. n°2: Les enfants du serpent)	Jérôme Bouyer	
1997	Nana	Fabianne Bobil; Fabienne Bouville; Ruth Gadish; Suheir Ismail; Alison King	With K. Abid, A. James and Roni Katzenelson
2000	La spirale du pianiste	Judith Abitbol	With Claire Bailly du Bois
2003	Histoire d'un secret	Marianna Otero	
2005	Vers Mathilde	Claire Denis	With Agnès Godard
2005	Sandra Kalniete	Dominique Blanc	
2008	The Beaches of Agnès	Agnès Varda	With Julia Fabry, Jean-Baptiste Morin, Arlene Nelson, Alain Sakot and Agnès Varda
2011	Pina	Wim Wenders	With Jörg Widmer
2013	Mille Soleils	Mati Diop	Shared credit with Diop
2013	À ciel ouvert	Mariana Otero	
2016	Dans les pas de Trisha Brown	Marie-Hélène Rebois	
2016	Une jeune fille de 90 ans	Valeria Bruni Tedeschi; Yann Coridian	Shared credit with Coridian
2019	Histoire d'un regard	Mariana Otero	With Karine Aulnette
2023	Love & Crashes	Lucile Chaufour	

=== Television ===
TV movie

Year	Title	Director	Notes
1998	Laisse un peu d'amour	Zaïda Ghorab-Volta	
2009	Quand la ville mord	Dominique Cabrera	
2011	L'énergumène	Jean-Loïc Portron	
2011	Mademoiselle Julie	Nicolas Klotz	Also editor
2011	Val d'or	Nicolas Klotz	
2012	Ça ne peut pas continuer comme ça!	Dominique Cabrera	
2014	La vie à l'envers	Anne Giafferi	

TV series

Year	Title	Director	Notes
2009	Suite noire	Dominique Cabrera	Segment Quand la ville mord
2010	P.O.V.	Agnès Varda	Segment The Beaches of Agnes
2020	My Brilliant Friend	Alice Rohrwacher	Episodes "The Kiss" ("Il bacio") and "The Betrayal" ("Il tradimento")

== Awards ==
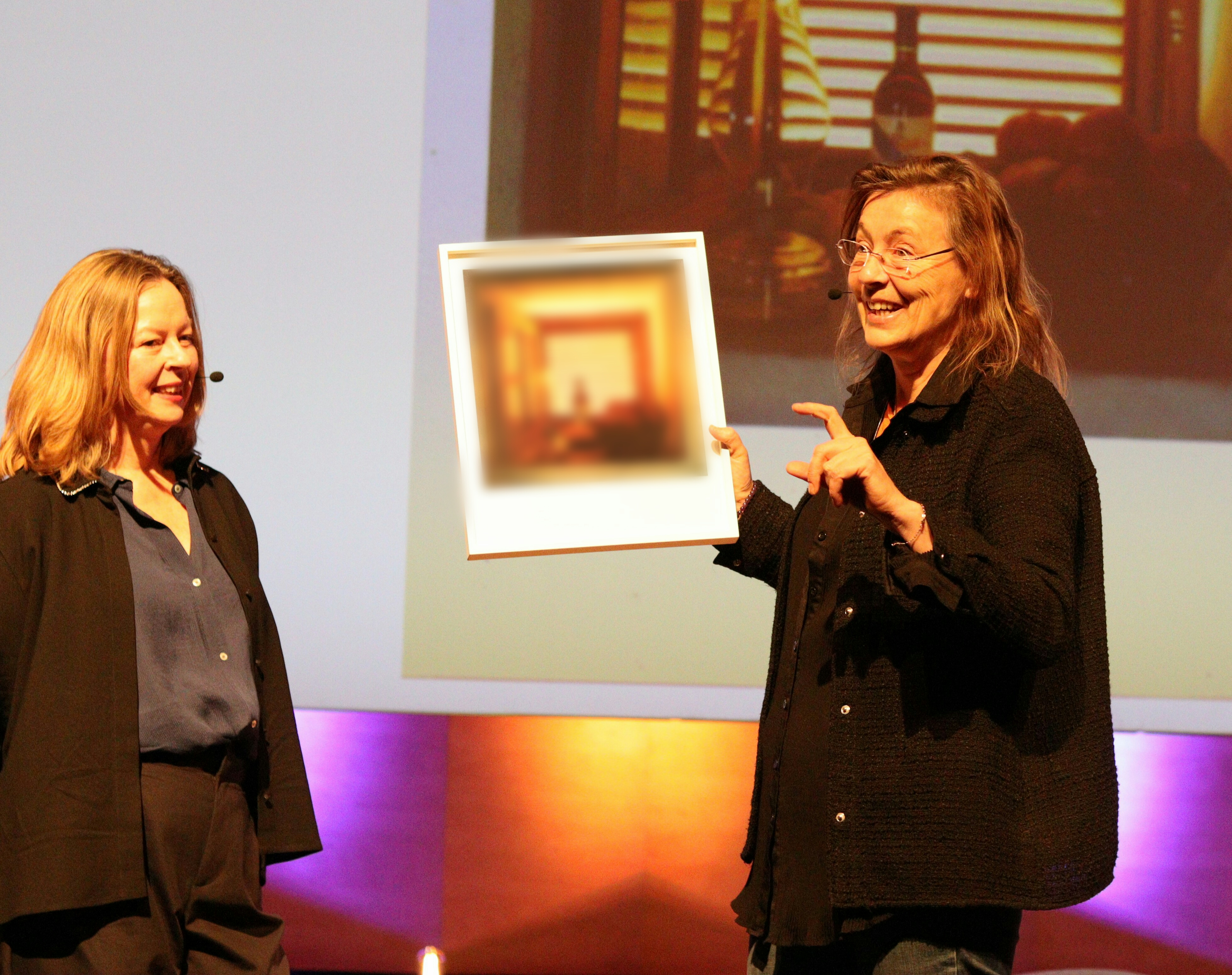
Louvart being presented with the Robby Müller Award at the IFFR 2023

- Cinematographer Award 2012, Fondation WIFTS (Women’s International Film & Television Showcase)
- Gaudí Awards : Best Cinematography 2010 for "C'est ici que je vis (Petit Indi)", Marc Recha
- Marburger Kamerapreis 2018
- Robby Müller Award 2023
- Silver Bear for Outstanding Artistic Contribution (Cinematography), Berlinale 2023
