= Only Rebels Win =

2026 drama film

- Directed by: Danielle Arbid
- Written by: Danielle Arbid
- Produced by: Omar El Kadi; Nadia Turincev; George Schoucair
- Starring: Hiam Abbass; Amine Benrachid
- Cinematography: Céline Bozon
- Edited by: Clément Pinteaux
- Music by: Bachar Mar-Khalifé
- Production companies: Easy Riders Films; Abbout Productions; Rise Studio; Arab Radio and Television Network; Les Films Pelléas; Reborn Studio; Doha Film Institute; CNC
- Distributed by: JHR Films
- Release date: 12 February 2026 (Berlinale)
- Countries: France; Lebanon; Qatar

Only Rebels Win is a 2026 drama film written and directed by Danielle Arbid. It stars Hiam Abbass, Amine Benrachid, Shaden Fakih, Charbel Kamel, Rubis Ramadan and Alexandre Paulikevitch.

The film had its world premiere at the Panorama section of the 76th Berlin International Film Festival on 12 February 2026.

== Premise ==
In Beirut, a widow falls for a young man searching for a better future.

== Cast ==
- Hiam Abbass as Suzanne
- Amine Benrachid as Osmane
- Shaden Fakih
- Charbel Kamel
- Rubis Ramadan
- Alexandre Paulikevitch

== Production ==
In December 2023, it was announced Hiam Abbass and Amine Benrachid had joined the cast of the film, with Danielle Arbid directing from a screenplay she wrote.

Principal photography began in January 2025 at Montjoie Studios in France.

== Release ==
It had its world premiere at the 76th Berlin International Film Festival on 12 February 2026 in the Panorama section.
