= Le pupille =

- Movie poster
- Directed by: Alice Rohrwacher
- Written by: Alice Rohrwacher
- Produced by: Alfonso Cuarón; Carlo Cresta-Dina; Gabriela Rodriguez
- Starring: Alba Rohrwacher; Melissa Falasconi; Greta Zuccheri Montanari; Valeria Bruni Tedeschi
- Cinematography: Hélène Louvart
- Edited by: Carlotta Cristiani
- Music by: Cleaning Women
- Production companies: Esperanto Filmoj; Tempesta
- Distributed by: Disney+
- Release date: 27 May 2022 (Cannes)
- Running time: 37 minutes
- Country: Italy
- Language: Italian

Le pupille (Italian: [le puˈpille], "The Pupils") is a 2022 comedy-drama short film directed and written by Alice Rohrwacher. The film premiered at the 75th Cannes Film Festival, prior to being shown at several other festivals. It was released on the Disney+ streaming service on 16 December 2022. It was nominated for the Best Live Action Short Film at the 95th Academy Awards, becoming the first live-action short film released by Disney+ to be nominated for the award.

== Plot ==
Serafina is a young girl at a strict Catholic boarding school during World War II. She is an outcast, shunned by the other girls and treated unsympathetically by the nuns, who are led by Mother Superior Fioralba. On Christmas Eve, they jealously watch a fellow pupil leave to spend the holidays with her family before getting prepared to enact the midnight Nativity scene, where villagers will arrive to offer donations in exchange for prayers.

While getting dressed, the nuns turn on the radio to listen to the news bulletin about the war, and order the girls to stand in a line; however, they are soon distracted by needing to leave the room to attend to an ill child, and Serafina takes the opportunity to break away to retrieve a part of her costume that she'd dropped. While leaning against the radio, she inadvertently changes the station to music. The rest of the girls begin to dance and sing along to a love song, though Serafina does not participate.

Eventually, Fioralba returns, and is outraged at the sight. She washes all the girls' mouths out with soap for repeating the lyrics, but Serafina resists being punished, insisting that she hadn't been singing. Fioralba, annoyed, gets Serafina to admit that she can still remember the lyrics, and informs her that she is a "bad child" for refusing to own up to her sin.

At the nativity scene, as villagers arrive to ask for prayers, one of the attendees is a wealthy woman who had been trying to get the attention of the girls earlier. She asks for prayers for her boyfriend, who is having an affair, and in exchange offers zuppa inglese, a large custard cake, which the nuns view as a disgusting frivolity during the wartime scarcity, which is leading many Italians to starve to death.

The next morning, as the girls are served their Christmas meal, Fioralba presents the custard cake, which all of the girls are interested in. However, Fioralba is secretly planning on delivering the cake to the bishop in order to curry favor, as the boarding school is struggling for funds. She guilts most of the girls into giving up their portion of the cake by insisting that good children would make the sacrifice; however, Serafina refuses to give up her portion, pointing out that Fioralba told her that she is a "bad child" anyway. Defeated, Fioralba gives Serafina a slice of cake, but flies into a fury when Serafina throws handfuls of cake onto the ground for a stray dog to eat.

Fioralba sends all of the girls to their room, but Serafina grabs a handful of cake as she leaves, and happily shares it with the other girls, who finally accept her. Meanwhile, as Fioralba can no longer deliver the cake to the bishop, she gives it to the chimney sweeper whom she was unable to pay. The latter drops it on the way to share it with his colleagues, but this makes no difference; they eat it anyway.

== Production ==
The film was shot in Super 16 and in 35 mm format.

Rohrwacher said that the film is "about desires, pure and selfish, about freedom and devotion, about the anarchy that is capable of flowering in the minds of each one of them within the confines of the strict boarding school". She added that "although the obedient girls can't move, their pupils can dance the unrestrained dance of freedom."

== Release ==
Le Pupille premiered at the Cannes Film Festival before traveling the festival circuit. The film was released on Disney+ on 16 December 2022.

== Reception ==
=== Critical response ===
On the review aggregator website Rotten Tomatoes, the short film holds an approval rating of 91% based on 11 critic reviews, with an average rating of 8.50/10.

Noel Murray of Los Angeles Times asserted, "It'd be a sin to spoil what happens next, but suffice to say this charming and surprisingly suspenseful film shares with Rohrwacher's other work a puckish sense of humor and a deep understanding of how sometimes, in the name of righteousness, people can be awfully wicked." John Serbe of Decider called the short film a "delightful Christmas short," writing, "Le Pupille is a mischievous little thing with a smartly realized setting and visual aesthetic. Shot on warm and grainy 16mm film, it looks suitably authentic—and the emotions and laughs you'll experience are, too. Rohrwacher masterfully directs her young cast, capturing their innocent wildness and very subtly underscoring their fleeting moments of joy with the sadness of their situation: It's Christmas."

Sarah Williams of InReviewOnline said, "Rohrwacher's amoral fable, though a delightfully rare higher-profile mid-length film dropped into an era of silver screen epic versus glorified TikTok binarism, could arguably benefit from a lengthier study of the institution its narrative is held within. Though the somewhat underbaked narrative is limited to that of the letter, the cultural rise of a Mussolini-era fascist Italy lurking in the background, paralleled with the authoritarian religious state of the Catholic school, reflects a maturation of Rohrwacher's typical themes." Joly Herman of Common Sense Media gave Le Pupille a grade of 5 out of 5 stars, complimented the educational value, and praised the positive messages and role models, citing loyalty and kindness, stating, "Character strengths include compassion and self-control."

=== Accolades ===
Le pupille was nominated for the IMDbPro Short Cuts Award for Best Film Award at the Toronto International Film Festival in 2022. It was also nominated for the best short film at the Philadelphia Film Festival in 2022, and was given honorable mentions for Best Production Design (to Emita Frigato and Eachele Meliadò), and for Best Actor (Melissa Falasconi). It received a nomination for Best Live Action Short Film at the 95th Academy Awards.
