= Heavenly Body (film) =

2011 film

- Film poster
- Directed by: Alice Rohrwacher
- Written by: Alice Rohrwacher
- Produced by: Carlo Cresto-Dina
- Starring: Salvatore Cantalupo
- Cinematography: Hélène Louvart
- Edited by: Marco Spoletini
- Music by: Piero Crucitti
- Release dates: 17 May 2011 (Cannes); 20 May 2011 (Italy)
- Running time: 100 minutes
- Country: Italy
- Language: Italian

Heavenly Body (Italian: Corpo celeste) is a 2011 Italian drama film directed by Alice Rohrwacher. It premiered in the Directors' Fortnight section at the 2011 Cannes Film Festival to critical acclaim.

== Plot ==
The film relates a young girl's experience of coming to age and receiving Confirmation. Her parish is run by a corrupt priest, Don Mario, and his helpers. The film covers her relationship not only with herself but with the alienating world which surrounds her, including the Catholic Church.

== Cast ==
- Salvatore Cantalupo as Don Mario
- Anita Caprioli as Rita
- Renato Carpentieri as Don Lorenzo
- Paola Lavini as Fortunata
- Pasqualina Scuncia as Santa
- Yile Vianello as Marta

== Reception ==
Heavenly Body has an approval rating of 84% on review aggregator website Rotten Tomatoes, based on 19 reviews, and an average rating of 6.9/10. Metacritic assigned the film a weighted average score of 65 out of 100, based on 10 critics, indicating "generally favorable reviews".
