= La chimera =

2023 film by Alice Rohrwacher

- Release poster
- Directed by: Alice Rohrwacher
- Written by: Alice Rohrwacher
- Produced by: Carlo Cresto Dina
- Starring: Josh O'Connor; Carol Duarte; Vincenzo Nemolato; Alba Rohrwacher; Isabella Rossellini
- Cinematography: Hélène Louvart
- Edited by: Nelly Quettier
- Production companies: Tempesta; Rai Cinema; Ad Vitam Production; Amka Films Productions; RSI Radiotelevisione svizzera SRG SSR; Arte France Cinéma
- Distributed by: 01 Distribution (Italy); Ad Vitam Distribution (France); Filmcoopi (Switzerland)
- Release dates: 26 May 2023 (Cannes); 23 November 2023 (Italy); 6 December 2023 (France)
- Running time: 133 minutes
- Countries: Italy; France; Switzerland
- Languages: Italian; English; French; Brazilian Portuguese
- Box office: $5.2 million

La chimera (Italian: [la kiˈmɛːra]; lit. 'The chimera') is a 2023 comedy-drama film written and directed by Alice Rohrwacher. It is set in Italy in the 1980s in a small town on the Tyrrhenian Sea and stars Josh O'Connor as a British archaeologist-turned-grave robber with a gift for divining the locations of Etruscan tombs. Isabella Rossellini, Alba Rohrwacher, Carol Duarte, and Vincenzo Nemolato appear in supporting roles.

La chimera was selected to compete for the Palme d'Or at the 76th Cannes Film Festival, where it premiered on 26 May 2023. It was released in Italy by 01 Distribution on 23 November 2023. It received 13 nominations at the 69th David di Donatello awards. The film received positive reviews from critics, being named one of the top 5 international films of 2023 by the National Board of Review.

== Plot ==
In 1980, Arthur, a sullen former British archaeologist, returns to his home in central Italy after being released from jail. After lashing out at his fellow passengers on the train, he visits his ex-girlfriend Beniamina's mother, Flora, at her crumbling estate, where he also meets her long-suffering housemaid and student, Italia. Beniamina has been missing for an undisclosed amount of time, but Flora is convinced she will one day return. Beniamina's sisters are sick of Arthur seemingly freeloading off their mother and try to find him a job, which he refuses.

Back at his ramshackle home, Arthur reunites with his band of rakish tombaroli friends. At Epiphany celebrations, a farmer approaches them about a tomb on his land. Arthur, his gang, and young photographer Melodie search for the tomb, which Arthur locates using a dowsing rod and a 'chimera', a vision he experiences near gravesites. The gang deceives the farmer in order to excavate and fence the Etruscan grave goods for themselves, but are disappointed by their compensation from Spartaco, Arthur's antiquity dealer contact.

As Arthur hangs around Flora's house, he grows close to Italia, who is hiding her two children in the house. After a festival, Arthur confesses his feelings to her on a beach. However, they are interrupted when Arthur experiences a chimera. Italia is upset by the revelation that Arthur and his friends are tomb robbers, as she believes that the grave goods he loots belong to the souls of the dead, not the living. She asks what Beniamina would think of him, but Arthur's band tells her that Beniamina is dead. Mocked and insulted, she storms away and threatens to call the police.

The "tomb" turns out to be an untouched Etruscan underground shrine. Arthur is transfixed by the central statue of a goddess, and is heartbroken when his friends decapitate it in order to move it out of the chamber. The band is interrupted by police sirens and flee with the statue's head, unaware that the sirens were a trick by a rival group which loots the rest of the artifacts in the shrine.

After learning that they have the statue's head, Melodie brings the band to Spartaco, her aunt, who is auctioning off the "priceless" headless statue to curators on a boat. Believing the statue to be their rightful loot, the tombaroli attempt to blackmail her with the statue's head. Arthur unwraps the head, but, remembering Italia's words, hurls it overboard into the lake, to the astonishment and fury of Spartaco and the other tombaroli.

On the train back, Arthur hallucinates the passengers from the start asking where their grave goods have been taken. After parting ways with his band, he returns to his shack only to see it demolished by the police. He gets back in touch with Italia, who was evicted by Flora's daughters and has set up a communal squat with other single mothers in an abandoned train station. She invites him to live with them, but Arthur sneaks away after staying the night.

Arthur joins the rival band of tombaroli. When he locates an underground chamber, they implore him to enter it first. As it collapses onto him, Arthur has a vision where he reunites with Beniamina.

== Cast ==
- Josh O'Connor as Arthur
- Carol Duarte as Italia
- Vincenzo Nemolato as Pirro
- Alba Rohrwacher as Spartaco
- Isabella Rossellini as Flora
- Lou Roy-Lecollinet as Mélodie
- Giuliano Mantovani as Jerry
- Gian Piero Capretto as Mario
- Melchiorre Pala as Melchiorre
- Ramona Fiorini as Fabiana
- Luca Gargiullo as Dock Worker
- Yile Vianello as Beniamina
- Barbara Chiesa as Nella
- Elisabetta Perotto as Vera
- Chiara Pazzaglia as Rossa
- Francesca Carrain as Sista
- Valentino Santagati as Troubadour (voice and guitar)
- Piero Crucitti as Troubadour (triangle and accordion)
- Luciano Vergaro as Katir
- Carlo Tarmati as Carabiniere

== Production ==
Filmmaker Alice Rohrwacher planned La chimera as the last part of a trilogy with Le meraviglie (The Wonders, 2014) and Lazzaro felice (Happy as Lazzaro, 2018) to investigate our relationship with the past. For the last film she chose an international cast for the first time.

Filming was in February 2022 and in August 2022, on locations in southern Tuscany (Montalcino, Asciano–Monte Antico railway, Monte Amiata Scalo, Torrenieri), northern Lazio (Tarquinia, Blera, San Lorenzo Nuovo, Civitavecchia) and Umbria (villa di Casa Pisana in Castel Giorgio), with additional filming in Switzerland.

== Release ==
La chimera premiered at the 76th Cannes Film Festival on 26 May 2023, where it was selected to compete for the Palme d'Or and received a nine-minute standing ovation. It screened at the 61st New York Film Festival in October 2023. It was also invited at the 28th Busan International Film Festival in 'Icon' section and was screened on 7 October 2023.

It was released in Italy by 01 Distribution on 23 November 2023, and in France by Ad Vitam on 6 December 2023. Neon acquired North American distribution rights to the film at the Marché du Film at Cannes in May 2022; it was released in the United States by Neon on 29 March 2024. Earlier, in the United States, it was released for a one-week awards-qualifying run beginning 8 December 2023. Elastica released the film in Spain on 19 April 2024. Curzon released the film in the United Kingdom and Ireland on 10 May 2024.

== Reception ==
=== Box office ===
The film opened in North America on 29 March 2024 and grossed $44,511 from 3 theatres during its opening weekend, finishing 32nd at the box office.

As of 11 September 2024, La chimera grossed $1 million in North America (USA, Canada and Puerto Rico), and $4,231,797 in other territories, for a worldwide total of $5.2 million.

=== Critical response ===
On the review aggregator website Rotten Tomatoes, 95% of 151 critics' reviews are positive, with an average rating of 8.2/10. The website's consensus reads: "If La Chimera is a wild, improbable pursuit, this marvelous and magical tale by Alice Rohrwacher is the pie in the sky to behold." Metacritic, which uses a weighted average, assigned the film a score of 91 out of 100, based on 31 critics, indicating "universal acclaim".

In his review for Variety, following its premiere at Cannes, Guy Lodge called the film "marvelously supple and sinuous" and commended Rohrwacher's direction, the cinematography and the cast performances, particularly O'Connor's, of which he wrote: "Raffish and boyish at the same time—or switching between either mode as a cover for the other—O'Connor's deft, droll performance implies such possibilities without sentimentalizing them". Peter Bradshaw of The Guardian gave the film five out of five stars, reporting that the film "totally occupies its own narrative space," depicting "a poignant sense of Italy as a treasure trove of past glories, a necropolitan culture of ancient excellence," through direction that is "exhilarating and celebratory in its utterly distinctive style."

The film was considered one of the best Italian films of 2023 by Italian critics. Alessandro De Simone of Ciak wrote that it has "an avowedly Pasolinian structure" in which the director inserts "a calculated anarchy in narrative and in staging," finding it overall "very simple, the chaos is orderly, fascinating and magical," although "it could have been more so." Andrea Chimento of Il Sole 24 Ore described the project as Rohrwacher's "most ambitious and profound operation", which although it "spins too much in the middle part," emerges as "an intriguing and enigmatic film, endowed with a symbolic atmosphere that makes it a feature film worth thinking about and digesting."

In June 2025, IndieWire ranked the film at number 18 on its list of "The 100 Best Movies of the 2020s (So Far)." In July 2025, it was one of the films voted for the "Readers' Choice" edition of The New York Times' list of "The 100 Best Movies of the 21st Century," finishing at number 187.

=== Accolades ===
Award	Date of ceremony	Category	Recipient(s)	Result	Ref.
Brussels Mediterranean Film Festival	8 December 2023	Prix Spécial du Jury	La chimera	Won	
Cannes Film Festival	27 May 2023	AFCAE Art House Cinema Award	Alice Rohrwacher	Won	
Cannes Film Festival	27 May 2023	Palme Dog - Mutt Moment	La chimera	Won	
Cannes Film Festival	27 May 2023	Palme d'Or	Alice Rohrwacher	Nominated	
Chicago International Film Festival	22 October 2023	Gold Hugo	La chimera	Nominated	
Chicago International Film Festival	22 October 2023	Silver Hugo for Best Cinematography	Hélène Louvart	Won	
Chicago International Film Festival	22 October 2023	Silver Hugo for Best Ensemble Performance	Cast of La chimera	Won	
Manchester Film Festival	24 March 2024	Golden Bee for Best Feature Film	La chimera	Won	
David di Donatello	3 May 2024	Best Film	La chimera	Nominated	
David di Donatello	3 May 2024	Best Producer	Carlo Cresto-Dina, Paolo Del Brocco, Rai Cinema, AMKA Films Productions, Ad Vitam Production	Nominated	
David di Donatello	3 May 2024	Best Director	Alice Rohrwacher	Nominated	
David di Donatello	3 May 2024	Best Actor	Josh O'Connor	Nominated	
David di Donatello	3 May 2024	Best Supporting Actress	Alba Rohrwacher	Nominated	
David di Donatello	3 May 2024	Best Supporting Actress	Isabella Rossellini	Nominated	
David di Donatello	3 May 2024	Best Original Screenplay	Alice Rohrwacher	Nominated	
David di Donatello	3 May 2024	Best Cinematography	Hélène Louvart	Nominated	
David di Donatello	3 May 2024	Best Production Design	Emita Frigato, Rachele Meliadò	Nominated	
David di Donatello	3 May 2024	Best Editing	Nelly Quettier	Nominated	
David di Donatello	3 May 2024	Best Sound	Xavier Lavorel, Marta Billingsley, Maxence Ciekawy	Nominated	
David di Donatello	3 May 2024	Best Costumes	Loredana Buscemi	Nominated	
David di Donatello	3 May 2024	Best Hairstyling	Daniela Tartari	Nominated	
European Film Awards	9 December 2023	Best Production Designer	Emita Frigato	Won	
European Film Awards	9 December 2023	Best European Actor	Josh O'Connor	Nominated	
Golden Ciak	25 January 2024	Best Motion Picture - Drama	La chimera	Nominated	
Golden Ciak	25 January 2024	Best Director	Alice Rohrwacher	Nominated	
Goya Awards	8 February 2025	Best European Film	La chimera	Nominated	
International Cinephile Society	11 February 2024	Best Picture	La chimera	Nominated	
International Cinephile Society	11 February 2024	Best Actor	Josh O'Connor	Nominated	
International Cinephile Society	11 February 2024	Best Cinematography	Hélène Louvart	Nominated	
London Film Critics Circle	2 February 2025	Film of the Year	La chimera	Nominated	
London Film Critics Circle	2 February 2025	Foreign Language Film of the Year	La chimera	Nominated	
London Film Critics Circle	2 February 2025	British/Irish Performer of the Year (for body of work)	Josh O'Connor	Nominated	
Nastro d'Argento	27 June 2024	Best Film	Alice Rohrwacher	Nominated	
Nastro d'Argento	27 June 2024	Best Director	Alice Rohrwacher	Nominated	
Nastro d'Argento	27 June 2024	Best Screenplay	Alice Rohrwacher	Nominated	
Nastro d'Argento	27 June 2024	Best Supporting Actress	Isabella Rossellini	Won	
Nastro d'Argento	27 June 2024	Best Costume Design	Loredana Buscemi	Nominated	
Nastro d'Argento	27 June 2024	Guglielmo Biraghi Award	Yile Yara Vianello	Won	
Swiss Film Awards	22 March 2024	Best Sound	Xavier Lavorel	Won	
Telluride Film Festival	24 September 2023	Silver Medallion Award	Alice Rohrwacher	Won	
Valladolid International Film Festival	28 October 2023	Golden Spike	La chimera	Nominated	
Valladolid International Film Festival	28 October 2023	Silver Spike	La chimera	Won	
