= Manchester Film Festival =

Annual film festival in Manchester, United Kingdom

- Location: Manchester, United Kingdom
- Founded: 2015
- Website: manchesterfilmfestival.com

The Manchester Film Festival (MFF) is an annual film festival held in Manchester, United Kingdom. Established in 2015, the festival celebrates independent cinema by showcasing both established and emerging filmmakers from around the world.

The festival is BAFTA-qualifying for British short films.

== History ==
The festival was founded in 2015 by Neil Jeram-Croft, who also serves as the festival director.

Notable guests have included Simon Pegg, Kit Harington, Shia LaBeouf, Katharine O'Brien, Penn Badgley, and Mark Gatiss, among others.

In 2024, Screen International included the festival on its list of the "UK film festivals you need to know".

== Awards ==
Films in the official selection compete for awards in the following categories:

- Golden Bee - Feature
- Golden Bee - Short
- Special Jury Prize - Feature
- Special Jury Prize - Short
- Best UK Feature
- Best Documentary Feature
- Best International Feature
- Best UK Short
- Best International Short
- Best North West Short
- Best Student Film
- Best Documentary Short
- Best Animation
- Best Experimental
- Best Music Video
- Best Director - Feature
- Best Director - Short
- Best Actor - Feature
- Best Actor - Short
- Best Actress - Feature
- Best Actress - Short
- Best Cinematography - Feature
- Best Cinematography - Short
- Audience Award - Feature
- Audience Award - Short

== Winners ==
=== Golden Bee for Best Feature Film ===
Year	Film	Director	Ref.
2026	LifeHack	Ronan Corrigan	
2025	Aontas	Damian McCann	
2024	La Chimera	Alice Rohrwacher	
2023	A Kind of Kidnapping	Dan Clark	
2022	The Road Dance	Richie Adams	
