= Happy as Lazzaro =

2018 Italian magical realistic drama film by Alice Rohrwacher

- Italian theatrical release poster
- Italian: Lazzaro felice
- Literally: Happy Lazzaro
- Directed by: Alice Rohrwacher
- Written by: Alice Rohrwacher
- Produced by: Carlo Cresto-Dina
- Starring: Adriano Tardiolo; Agnese Graziani; Luca Chikovani; Alba Rohrwacher; Sergi López; Tommaso Ragno; Nicoletta Braschi
- Cinematography: Hélène Louvart
- Edited by: Nelly Quettier
- Production companies: Tempesta; Rai Cinema; Amka Films Productions; Ad Vitam Production; KNM; Pola Pandora; RSI Radiotelevisione Svizzera; ARTE France Cinéma; ZDF/ARTE
- Distributed by: 01 Distribution; Piffl Medien; Ad Vitam Distribution; Netflix
- Release dates: 13 May 2018 (Cannes); 31 May 2018 (Italy); 13 September 2018 (Germany); 7 November 2018 (France)
- Running time: 125 minutes
- Countries: Italy; Switzerland; France; Germany
- Language: Italian
- Box office: $1.8 million

Happy As Lazzaro (Italian: Lazzaro Felice, lit. 'Happy Lazzaro') is a 2018 Italian magical realist drama film written and directed by Alice Rohrwacher. It was selected to compete for the Palme d'Or at the 2018 Cannes Film Festival, where Rohrwacher won the award for Best Screenplay.

== Plot ==
In the 80s or 90s, a small community of sharecroppers live in primitive circumstances in L'Inviolata, an Italian tobacco estate. Isolated from the outside world by a washed-out bridge, they are kept in a state of perpetual debt bondage to Marchioness Alfonsina De Luna. Among the peasants is Lazzaro, a good-natured and simple farmhand who diligently follows every command of the De Luna family and his fellow peasants.

Tancredi, the rebellious son of the marchioness, befriends Lazzaro and runs away with him into the surrounding badlands in a self-kidnapping plot. He gifts Lazzaro a broken slingshot, and offhandedly suggests that they may be half-brothers; Lazzaro is deeply affected by these overtures. His mother initially dismisses the kidnapping as a prank, but the estate manager's daughter Teresa manages to reach out to the police. The Carabinieri arrive and are astonished to discover a community unaware of public education, the abolition of sharecropping, and their own freedom of movement. They evacuate the peasants, but Lazzaro, still in the badlands and startled by the police helicopter, falls off of a cliff.

Years later, a wolf nudges the miraculously unharmed and unaged Lazzaro awake. He returns to L'Inviolata to find the estate abandoned, and encounters looters stripping the De Luna villa of valuables. The looters eventually agree to take him to their squat in the city, where he is recognized by Antonia, a former resident of L'Inviolata. She is living with a band of other former L'Inviolata sharecroppers, many of whom are unnerved by Lazzaro's return. They tell him of the estate's fate: the exposure of L'Inviolata led to the fall of the marchioness, but many of the former peasants, unable to cope with modernity, were reduced to homelessness and have lived off of petty scams since. Unsuited for these criminal pursuits because of his guilelessness, Lazarro instead helps the peasants by identifying and preparing edible plants growing in the railyard where they live.

One day, Lazzaro runs into Tancredi, and the two have a tearful reunion. Lazzaro invites him to the peasants' hideout, and he returns the favor, inviting them for lunch the next day. The peasants dress up and buy expensive pastries for the lunch, but when they arrive at Tancredi's rundown apartment, they are greeted by his now-wife Teresa, who denies that they were ever invited. She laments her and Tancredi's circumstances, blaming them on "the bank", takes the pastries, and asks them to leave. On their way back, moved by the sound of organ music, the band enter a church but are shooed away by a nun. When they depart, the music supernaturally leaves the church and follows them. As the band cheerfully consider returning to L'Inviolata as squatters, Lazzaro sits down and weeps.

The next morning, Lazzaro enters a bank with Tancredi's slingshot in his pocket and is mistaken for an armed robber. He naively requests that it give back to Tancredi "everything that belongs to the Marquis of Luna". Lazzaro has a vision of a wolf as the bank's irate clients realize that he is unarmed and begin to savagely beat him. As the Carabinieri arrive and Lazzaro bleeds out, the wolf runs out of the bank and into the city streets, back to the countryside.

== Cast ==
- Adriano Tardiolo as Lazzaro
- Agnese Graziani as young Antonia
- Luca Chikovani as young Tancredi
- Alba Rohrwacher as adult Antonia
- Sergi López as Ultimo
- Natalino Balasso as Nicola
- Tommaso Ragno as adult Tancredi
- Nicoletta Braschi as Marchesa Alfonsina De Luna

== Production ==
Happy as Lazzaro was produced by Tempesta with Rai Cinema, in co-production with Amka Films Productions, Ad Vitam Production, KNM, Pola Pandora, RSI Radiotelevisione Svizzera, ARTE France Cinéma, and ZDF/ARTE. Rohrwacher envisions Happy as Lazzaro as the second part of a trilogy with Le meraviglie (The Wonders, 2014) and La chimera (La Chimera, 2023).

== Release ==
Happy as Lazzaro was selected to compete for the Palme d'Or at the 2018 Cannes Film Festival, where it had its world premiere on 13 May 2018. It was theatrically released in Italy by 01 Distribution on 31 May 2018. It was released in Germany by Piffl Medien on 13 September 2018, and in France by Ad Vitam Distribution on 7 November 2018. World sales were handled by The Match Factory.

== Reception ==
=== Critical response ===
According to the review aggregator website Rotten Tomatoes, 91% of critics have given the film a positive review based on 89 reviews, with an average rating of 7.8/10. The site's critics consensus reads, "Happy as Lazzaro uses a friendship's ups and downs as a satisfyingly expansive canvas for a picture rich with thematic and cinematic depth." At Metacritic, the film has a weighted average score of 87 out of 100 based on 27 critics, indicating "universal acclaim".

Erika Balsom writing for the British Film Institute, described the film as a "devastating exploration of the false promise of progress and the elusive possibility of collective happiness."

Bong Joon-ho said the film "probes the rift between agrarian and modern life, and contains one of the most dazzling twists – and tracking shots – in recent memory."

=== Accolades ===
Award	Category	Recipient(s) and nominee(s)	Result	Ref.
Cannes Film Festival	Best Screenplay	Alice Rohrwacher	Won	
National Board of Review	Top Five Foreign-Language Films	Happy as Lazzaro	Won	
Independent Spirit Awards	Best International Film	Happy as Lazzaro	Nominated	
