= Parisienne (film) =

2015 film by Danielle Arbid

- Theatrical release poster
- French: Peur de rien
- Directed by: Danielle Arbid
- Written by: Danielle Arbid
- Produced by: Philippe Martin; David Thion
- Starring: Manal Issa
- Cinematography: Hélène Louvart
- Edited by: Mathilde Muyard
- Distributed by: Ad Vitam Distribution
- Release dates: 12 September 2015 (TIFF); 10 February 2016 (France)
- Running time: 119 minutes
- Country: France
- Languages: French; Arabic
- Budget: €1.9 million ($2.2 million)
- Box office: $124,000

Parisienne (French: Peur de rien, lit. 'Afraid of Nothing') is a 2015 French drama film written and directed by Danielle Arbid. It was screened in the Contemporary World Cinema section of the 2015 Toronto International Film Festival.

== Cast ==
- Manal Issa as Lina
- Vincent Lacoste as Rafaël
- Paul Hamy as Jean-Marc
- Damien Chapelle as Julien
- Clara Ponsot as Antonia
- Bastien Bouillon as Arnaud
- India Hair as Victoire
- Orelsan as Julien's friend

== Accolades ==
Award / Film Festival	Category	Recipients and nominees	Result
Dubai International Film Festival	Best Fiction Feature	Danielle Arbid	Nominated
Les Arcs European Film Festival	Crystal Arrow	Danielle Arbid	Nominated
