= Martha Batalha =

Brazilian writer and journalist

Martha Batalha is a Brazilian writer and journalist and publisher, best known for her debut novel The Invisible Life of Eurídice Gusmão (Portuguese: A Vida Invisível de Eurídice Gusmão), which was adapted into the 2019 film Invisible Life, directed by Karim Aïnouz.

== Biography ==
Born in Recife in 1973, Batalha was raised in Rio de Janeiro She studied Journalism at the Pontifical Catholic University of Rio de Janeiro, has a master's degree in Brazilian Literature from the same university and one in Publishing from the New York University, having received the Oscar Dystel fellowship in 2009.

Batalha wrote for the newspapers O Dia, O Globo and Extra. In 2013, she founded the publishing house Desiderata, which was sold to Ediouro publishing group in 2008.

Her first novel, A Vida Invisível de Eurídice Gusmão (The Invisible Life of Eurídice Gusmão) was rejected by several Brazilian publishers before its rights were first sold to German publishing house Suhrkamp. The book was eventually published in her birth country by Companhia das Letras in 2016 and was adapted into the 2019 film Invisible Life, directed by Karim Aïnouz. Batalha currently lives in Santa Monica, California, with her husband and children.

== Thems and style ==
The works of Martha Batalha focus on socially invisible and marginalized characters, particularly women, the elderly, and members of the working classes in Brazil. The author pays close attention to everyday details related to domestic work, food, and family relationships, using them as a lens to understand the social, economic, and political transformations that Brazilian society has undergone in recent decades.Her novels are characterized by the portrayal of deferred dreams and life trajectories shaped by economic constraints and social limitations, while also highlighting individuals’ capacity to endure and adapt despite disappointment, isolation, and social vulnerability. She also uses elements of daily life—such as cooking, food, and domestic routines—to reveal economic inequalities and ongoing changes in society, where small details become indicators of broader structural transformations. Her writing blends irony with a tragic tone, combining humor and melancholy in the depiction of characters experiencing loneliness, aging, or marginalization, while searching for meaning in rapidly changing circumstances. Recurring themes in her work include memory, friendship, fragile human relationships, and the impact of political, economic, and health crises on everyday life.

The urban setting, especially the city of Rio de Janeiro, plays a central role in her works, appearing not merely as a backdrop but as a space marked by strong contradictions, combining beauty and harshness, vitality and violence, alongside deep social inequality. Her texts also highlight the role of journalism and media in shaping collective awareness and constructing narratives about social and political reality.

Her works are known for their fluid style and their focus on everyday storytelling, with a clear interest in small details and individual experiences as a way of understanding contemporary Brazilian society and its transformations.

== Works ==
- 2016- The Invisible Life of Eurídice Gusmão (A vida invisível de Eurídice Gusmão) .
- 2018- Nunca houve um castelo
- 2023- Chuva de Papel
- 2024 - Liz sem Medo
