= The Invisible Life of Eurídice Gusmão =

2019 film

- Theatrical release poster
- Portuguese: A Vida Invisível de Eurídice Gusmão
- Directed by: Karim Aïnouz
- Screenplay by: Murilo Hauser; Inés Bortagaray; Karim Aïnouz
- Based on: The Invisible Life of Eurídice Gusmão by Martha Batalha
- Produced by: Rodrigo Teixeira; Michael Weber; Viola Fügen
- Starring: Carol Duarte; Julia Stockler; Gregorio Duvivier; Bárbara Santos; Flávia Gusmão; Maria Manoella; Antônio Fonseca; Cristina Pereira; Gillray Coutinho; Fernanda Montenegro
- Cinematography: Hélène Louvart
- Edited by: Heike Parplies
- Music by: Benedikt Schiefer
- Production companies: RT Features; Pola Pandora; Canal Brasil; Naymar
- Distributed by: Sony Pictures; Vitrine Filmes
- Release dates: 20 May 2019 (Cannes); 21 November 2019 (Brazil)
- Running time: 139 minutes
- Countries: Brazil; Germany
- Language: Portuguese
- Box office: $1.7 million

The Invisible Life of Eurídice Gusmão (Portuguese: A Vida Invisível de Eurídice Gusmão) is a 2019 drama film directed by Karim Aïnouz, based on the 2016 novel The Invisible Life of Eurídice Gusmão by Martha Batalha.

The film had its world premiere at the Un Certain Regard section at the 2019 Cannes Film Festival, where it won the top prize. It was selected as the Brazilian entry for the Best International Feature Film at the 92nd Academy Awards, but it was not nominated.

== Plot ==
In 1950s Rio de Janeiro, sisters Eurídice and Guida Gusmão share a close bond despite their contrasting personalities. Eurídice is a talented pianist who dreams of studying music in Vienna, while Guida is a free-spirited romantic. Guida elopes with a Greek sailor but returns home pregnant and abandoned. Their conservative father disowns Guida and falsely tells her that Eurídice has left for Europe, while he also convinces Eurídice that Guida has disappeared abroad. Believing they have lost contact with one another, the sisters are forced onto separate paths.

Guida struggles to raise her son as a single mother, finding support among working-class neighbors, while Eurídice enters an arranged marriage that stifles her musical ambitions. Both women continue to write letters that are secretly intercepted by their father, unaware that their messages never reach each other. Over the years they endure hardship, love, and loss, each holding onto the hope of reunion. Decades later, the truth of their separation is revealed, exposing the lasting consequences of patriarchal control and missed opportunities.

== Cast ==
- Carol Duarte as Eurídice Gusmão
- Julia Stockler as Guida Gusmão
- Gregorio Duvivier as Antenor
- Bárbara Santos as Filomena
- Flávia Gusmão as Ana Gusmão
- Maria Manoella as Zélia
- Antônio Fonseca as Manuel Gusmão
- Cristina Pereira as Cecília
- Gillray Coutinho as Afonso
- Fernanda Montenegro as Present-Day Eurídice Gusmão

== Release ==
The film had its world premiere at the 2019 Cannes Film Festival on 20 May 2019. It was released in Brazil first in the Northeast Region on 19 September 2019, and on 31 October 2019 in the rest of the country, by Sony Pictures and Vitrine Filmes. On 20 August 2019, Amazon Studios acquired the North American rights to the film.

== Reception ==
=== Critical response ===
On the review aggregator website Rotten Tomatoes, the film holds a 94% approval rating based on 83 reviews, with an average rating of 7.6/10. The site's critical consensus reads, "Powerfully acted and rich with emotion, Invisible Life beguiles in the moment and leaves a lingering, dreamlike impression." Metacritic assigned the film a weighted average score of 81 out of 100, based on 18 critics, indicating "universal acclaim".

Guy Lodge of Variety praised Karim Aïnouz's "singular, saturated directorial style" and called the film "a waking dream, saturated in sound, music and color to match its depth of feeling." Writing for The Hollywood Reporter, David Rooney praised the film, commenting, "Despite its many depictions of cruel insensitivity, quotidian unfairness and chronic disappointment, The Invisible Life of Eurídice Gusmão is a haunting drama that quietly celebrates the resilience of women even as they endure beaten-down existences."

== See also ==
- List of submissions to the 92nd Academy Awards for Best International Feature Film
- List of Brazilian submissions for the Academy Award for Best International Feature Film
