= In the Battlefields =

In the battlefields - معارك حب
- Poster used in Cannes 2004
- Directed by: Danielle Arbid
- Written by: Danielle Arbid
- Produced by: Christian Baute; Jaques-Henri Bronckart; Elie Khalifé; Sabine Sidawi-Hamdan; Jérôme Vidal
- Starring: Marianne Feghali; Rawia El Chab; Laudi Arbid; Aouni Kawass; Carmen Leboss
- Cinematography: Hélène Louvart
- Music by: Boney M, Blondie, Azar Habib, The Buzzcocks
- Release dates: December 29, 2004 (France); June 29, 2005 (Belgium)
- Running time: 90 minutes
- Country: Lebanon
- Language: Arabic

In the Battlefields (French: Dans les champs de bataille, Arabic: معارك حب maarek hob) is a 2004 Lebanese film by director Danielle Arbid. The film premiered on May 16 during the 2004 Cannes Film Festival, in the Directors' Fortnight section where the film ran for the Caméra d'Or during the 2004 Cannes Film Festival. It is the first feature film by Danielle Arbid.

== Synopsis ==
In 1983, during the Lebanese civil war. Lina, a twelve-year-old girl, is a close friend with her eighteen-year-old aunt's maid Siham. She tries to defend her friend without getting any kind of attention from her or from her family.

Through the events, the film explores the impact of the civil war on the Lebanese family and its causes.

== Cast and characters ==
- Marianne Feghali as Lina.
- Rawia El Chab as Siham.
- Laudi Arbid as Yvonne (the aunt).
- Aouni Kawass as Fouad (the Father).
- Carmen Leboss as Thérèse (the mother).
- Danielle Arbid as the neighbor's friend.

== Production ==
The director Danielle Arbid made a brief appearance in the movie as the neighbor's friend.

== Awards and Recognitions ==
- Directors' Fortnight at the 2004 Cannes Film Festival.
- Nominated for the Camera d'Or at the 2004 Cannes Film Festival.
- Best Film Award at the Milan Film Festival, Italy, 2004.
- Arab World Institute Grand Prize for Feature Film at the 7th Arab Film Festival in Paris, 2004.
