= Motel Destino =

2024 film by Karim Aïnouz

- Brazilian theatrical release poster
- Directed by: Karim Aïnouz
- Written by: Wislan Esmeraldo: in collaboration with; Karim Aïnouz; Mauricio Zacharias (Note: The film credits Esmeraldo as writer, "in collaboration with" Aïnouz and Zacharias.)
- Produced by: Hélène Théodoly; Gabrielle Tana; Michael Weber; Viola Fügen; Didar Domehri; André Novis; Caio Gullane; Fabiano Gullane; Janaina Bernardes
- Starring: Iago Xavier; Nataly Rocha; Fábio Assunção
- Cinematography: Hélène Louvart
- Edited by: Nelly Quettier
- Music by: Amine Bouhafa
- Production companies: Cinema Inflamável; Gullane; Maneki Films; Match Factory Productions; Globo Filmes; Telecine; Canal Brasil
- Distributed by: Pandora Filmes (Brazil); Tandem Films (France); Piffl Medien (Germany)
- Release dates: 22 May 2024 (Cannes); 22 August 2024 (Brazil); 14 November 2024 (Germany); 25 December 2024 (France)
- Running time: 115 minutes
- Countries: Brazil; France; Germany
- Language: Portuguese
- Box office: $13,454

Motel Destino is a 2024 erotic thriller film directed and co-written by Karim Aïnouz. Starring Iago Xavier, Nataly Rocha and Fábio Assunção, it follows Heraldo (Xavier), a young impoverished man fleeing from his criminal past, who takes refuge at a motel in Fortaleza, a coastal city in Brazil.

The film had its world premiere at the main competition of the 2024 Cannes Film Festival on 22 May, where it was nominated for the Palme d'Or and Queer Palm. It was released in Brazil by Pandora Filmes on 22 August, in Germany by Piffl Medien on 14 November, and in France by Tandem Films on 25 December.

== Premise ==
The neon-hued Motel Destino, a roadside sex hotel glistening under the burning blue skies of the northeastern coast of Brazil, is run by hot-headed Elias and his restless younger wife Dayana. The unexpected arrival of 21-year-old Heraldo, on the run after a botched hit, disrupts the established order. As the tropical noir plays out, loyalties and desires intertwine to reveal that destiny has its own enigmatic design.

== Cast ==
- Iago Xavier as Heraldo
- Nataly Rocha as Dayana
- Fábio Assunção as Elias
- Renan Capivara as Jorge
- Fabiola Liper as Bambina
- Isabela Catão as Marta
- Yuri Yamamoto as Môco
- David Santos as Rafael
- Jupyra Carvalho as Carol
- Bertrand de Courville as Maxime

== Production ==
Motel Destino was produced by Cinema Inflamável and Gullane in co-production with Globo Filmes, Telecine, and Canal Brasil, and co-produced internationally by Maneki Films (France) and The Match Factory (Germany). The screenplay was written by Wislan Esmeraldo, in collaboration with Aïnouz and Mauricio Zacharias. The film was shot entirely in Ceará, where Aïnouz hails from. Iago Xavier and Nataly Rocha were selected for the lead roles after an extensive audition process which included over 500 actors.

== Release ==
Motel Destino was selected to compete for the Palme d'Or at the 2024 Cannes Film Festival, where it had its world premiere on 22 May 2024.

Pandora Filmes theatrically released the film in Brazil on 22 August 2024, while Piffl Medien released it in Germany on 14 November 2024, and Tandem Films distributed it in France on 25 December 2024. Brouhaha/Written Rock are handling the UK rights, and worldwide sales are entrusted to The Match Factory.

== Reception ==
=== Critical response ===
On the review aggregator website Rotten Tomatoes, 77% of 31 critics' reviews are positive, and those with numerical ratings or letter grades average 6.9 out of 10. The website's consensus reads: "Despite some narrative stumbles in its latter half and a style-over-substance approach at times, Motel Destino seduces with its sultry atmosphere, a trio of fearless performances, and stunning visuals." On Metacritic, the film has a weighted average score of 74 out of 100 based on 9 critic reviews, indicating "generally favorable" reviews.

In his review for The Guardian, Peter Bradshaw awarded the film four stars out of five, calling it "terrifically acted by its central trio: three intensely and unselfconsciously physical performances in which their bodies are frequently on show, sensual but fragile." Little White Lies was also positive about the film's merits, declaring it "a sleazy stay in a neon nightmare."

=== Accolades ===
Award	Date of ceremony	Category	Recipient(s)	Result	Ref.
Cannes Film Festival	25 May 2024	Palme d'Or	Karim Aïnouz	Nominated	
Cannes Film Festival	25 May 2024	Queer Palm	Karim Aïnouz	Nominated	
Grande Prêmio do Cinema Brasileiro	30 July 2025	Best Film	Motel Destino	Nominated	
Grande Prêmio do Cinema Brasileiro	30 July 2025	Best Director	Karim Aïnouz	Nominated	
Grande Prêmio do Cinema Brasileiro	30 July 2025	Best Actor	Fábio Assunção	Nominated	
Grande Prêmio do Cinema Brasileiro	30 July 2025	Best Cinematography	Hélène Louvart	Nominated	
Grande Prêmio do Cinema Brasileiro	30 July 2025	Best Production Design	Marcos Pedroso	Nominated	
Grande Prêmio do Cinema Brasileiro	30 July 2025	Best Costume Design	Kika Lopes and Ananda Frazão	Nominated	
Grande Prêmio do Cinema Brasileiro	30 July 2025	Best Score	Amine Bouhafa	Nominated	
Grande Prêmio do Cinema Brasileiro	30 July 2025	Best Sound	Moabe Filho, Pedro Moreira, Waldir Xavier and Adrian Baumeister	Nominated	
Grande Prêmio do Cinema Brasileiro	30 July 2025	Audience Award	Motel Destino	Nominated	
Lima Film Festival	17 August 2024	Best Picture	Motel Destino	Nominated	
São Paulo Art Critics Association	21 January 2025	Best Actor	Fábio Assunção	Nominated	
