= Raja (2003 film) =

- Directed by: Jacques Doillon
- Written by: [acques Doillon
- Produced by: Bénédicte Bellocq; Souad Lamriki; Margaret Ménégoz
- Starring: Pascal Greggory; Najat Benssallem; Ilham Abdelwahed
- Cinematography: Hélène Louvart
- Edited by: Gladys Joujou
- Music by: Philippe Sarde
- Distributed by: Les Films du Losange
- Release dates: August 28, 2003 (Venice Film Festival); September 3, 2003 (France)
- Running time: 112 minutes
- Country: France
- Language: French

Raja is a 2003 French film. A cross-cultural drama about a wealthy middle-aged Frenchman's yearning for a nineteen-year-old local girl.
