= The Wonders (film) =

2014 film

- Film poster
- Directed by: Alice Rohrwacher
- Written by: Alice Rohrwacher
- Produced by: Carlo Cresto-Dina
- Starring: Maria Alexandra Lungu; Sam Louwyck; Alba Rohrwacher; Sabine Timoteo; Monica Bellucci
- Cinematography: Hélène Louvart
- Edited by: Marco Spoletini
- Music by: Piero Crucitti
- Release dates: 18 May 2014 (Cannes); 22 May 2014 (Italy)
- Running time: 110 minutes
- Countries: Italy; Switzerland; Germany
- Languages: Italian; French; German

The Wonders (Italian: Le meraviglie) is a 2014 internationally co-produced drama film written and directed by Alice Rohrwacher. It was selected to compete for the Palme d'Or at the 2014 Cannes Film Festival where it won the Grand Prix.

== Plot ==
Gelsomina and her three younger sisters live with their parents on an Italian farm. As the eldest, she takes on a heavier burden, taking care of her sisters and assisting her father, Wolfgang, with beekeeping. One evening, as the family is playing on the beach, they are told to be quieter and discover that a TV show is being filmed nearby. They watch and, as they are about to leave, the star, Milly, calls them over and gives Gelsomina a hair clip.

Watching the program on TV, Gelsomina learns that it is launching a competition called Countryside Wonders, in which seven farmers will compete to have their products featured. While her father is strongly against participating, her mother warms to the idea, even though the quality of their honey is not great.

Meanwhile, Wolfgang hires a juvenile delinquent named Martin to help with honey production. Martin never talks. Though Wolfgang tries to help Martin, he discovers that he is ineffectual.

Unbeknownst to her father, Gelsomina applies on behalf of her family. She forgets about it after her father's old friend comes to stay. Later, left alone by their parents, while switching out the honeycombs to put in the processor, she accidentally injures one of her sisters, Marinella. At the hospital, while Marinella is being stitched up, Gelsomina realizes that Martin forgot to change the bucket which collects the processed honey and, on returning home, they find honey spilled over the floor. At the same time, they are visited by a man from the competition to inspect their production room. The children clean the work area and they are accepted. However, Wolfgang is infuriated by the news.

Nevertheless, the family competes on the show, where they are dressed in ridiculous garb and must plead their case to the judges. On TV, Wolfgang freezes and cannot explain what makes his honey so special. However, Gelsomina steps up and, with Martin, performs a trick in which he whistles and bees crawl out of her mouth onto her face. The family loses the competition, however. Martin runs away and Gelsomina follows him but cannot find him. On the last boat ride back from the island, she finds herself alone with Milly, who takes off her wig and gives Gelsomina a hairpin. Gelsomina swims back to the island and finds Martin, but returns to her family without him.

== Cast ==
- Alexandra Maria Lungu as Gelsomina
- Sam Louwyck as Wolfgang
- Alba Rohrwacher as Angelica
- André Hennicke as Adrian
- Monica Bellucci as Milly
- Sabine Timoteo as Coco
- Agnese Graziani as Marinella
- Eva Lea Pace Morrow as Caterina
- Maris Stella Morrow as Luna
- Luis Huilca Logrono as Martin
- Margarete Tiesel as social worker

== Production ==
Director Alice Rohrwacher based the movie on her memories of her childhood working for her parents, who were beekeepers. Rohrwacher stated that some parts of the film were filmed illegally, particularly the parts with the bees which they were not supposed to film for insurance purposes and which she filmed anyway on a national holiday when no one was around to stop her. She envisions The Wonders as the first part of a trilogy with Happy as Lazzaro (2018) and La chimera (La Chimera, 2023).

== Reception ==
The Wonders premiered at the 2014 Cannes Film Festival to positive reviews. On review aggregator Rotten Tomatoes, the film holds an approval rating of 96% based on 72 reviews, with an average rating of 7.3/10. The website's critical consensus reads, "The Wonders offers a charming coming-of-age tale that doubles as a quietly effective tribute to a vanishing way of life." On Metacritic, the film has a score of 76 out of 100, based on 17 critics, indicating "generally positive reviews".
