= The Three Incestuous Sisters =

- Directed by: Alice Rohrwacher
- Screenplay by: Alice Rohrwacher; Ottessa Moshfegh
- Based on: The Three Incestuous Sisters by Audrey Niffenegger
- Produced by: Dakota Johnson; Ro Donnelly; Steven Rales; Alice Rohrwacher
- Starring: Dakota Johnson; Saoirse Ronan; Jessie Buckley; Josh O'Connor; Isabella Rossellini; Mick Jagger
- Cinematography: Hélène Louvart
- Production companies: Indian Paintbrush; TeaTime Pictures
- Country: United States
- Language: English

The Three Incestuous Sisters is an upcoming American drama film directed and co-written by Alice Rohrwacher. It is based on the adult picture book written and illustrated by Audrey Niffenegger.

== Premise ==
Three sisters live together in a seaside house. When their neighbor, the lighthouse keeper, dies from a lightning strike, the women inform his son of the tragic news. After the lighthouse keeper's son shows up, a love triangle forms between himself and two of the sisters. When the young man gives his heart to the sister he does love, all involved suffer the consequences.

== Cast ==
- Jessie Buckley as Ophile
- Dakota Johnson as Clothilde
- Saoirse Ronan as Bettine
- Josh O'Connor as Paris
- Isabella Rossellini
- Mick Jagger
- Alba Rohrwacher

== Production ==
It was announced in February 2026 that Alice Rohrwacher was set to direct an adaptation of the Audrey Niffenegger's The Three Incestuous Sisters, with Dakota Johnson, Saoirse Ronan, Jessie Buckley and Josh O'Connor set to star. Rohrwacher will co-write the screenplay with Ottessa Moshfegh. In May, Isabella Rossellini was added to the cast. Set photos in May revealed Mick Jagger would have a role in the film.

Principal photography began in April 2026, with filming occurring in Stromboli, Italy. Hélène Louvart serves as the cinematographer, with the film set to be a majority silent film. A party attended by cast and crew celebrating the conclusion of filming at a Stromboli venue saw minor controversy when the local Carabinieri moved to shut the party down, as it was violating a music ban on Wednesdays. The head of the Stromboli tourism office criticized the move, as well as the mayor of Lipari Riccardo Gullo, the incident marking another instance of tension between Stromboli and the government.
