= Suely in the Sky =

2006 film directed by Karim Aïnouz

- Directed by: Karim Aïnouz
- Written by: Karim Aïnouz; Felipe Bragança; Mauricio Zacharias
- Produced by: Walter Salles; Mauricio Andrade Ramos; Hengameh Panahi; Thomas Häberle; Peter Rommel
- Starring: Hermila Guedes
- Cinematography: Walter Carvalho
- Edited by: Isabela Monteira de Castro; Tina Baz le Gal
- Music by: Berna Ceppas; Kamal Kassin; João Nabuco
- Production companies: VideoFilmes; Celluloid Dreams; Shotgun Pictures; Fado Filmes
- Release date: 17 November 2006
- Running time: 90 minutes
- Countries: Brazil; France; Germany; Portugal
- Language: Portuguese

Suely in the Sky (Portuguese: O Céu de Suely; also known as Love for Sale) is a 2006 Brazilian drama film directed and co-written by Karim Aïnouz.

== Plot ==
Hermila was born and raised in the small town in northeastern Brazil. To earn money she adopts the pseudonym Suely, and offers herself in a raffle. The winner will have what she calls "A Night in Paradise."

== Cast ==
- Hermila Guedes as Hermila/Suely
- Maria Menezes as Maria
- Zezita Matos as Zezita
- João Miguel as João
- Georgina Castro as Georgina
- Cláudio Jaborandy as Cláudio
- Marcélia Cartaxo as Marcélia
- Matheus Vieira as Matheus
- Flávio Bauraqui as receptionist
