= Alexandre Paulikevitch =

Lebanese dancer and choreographer

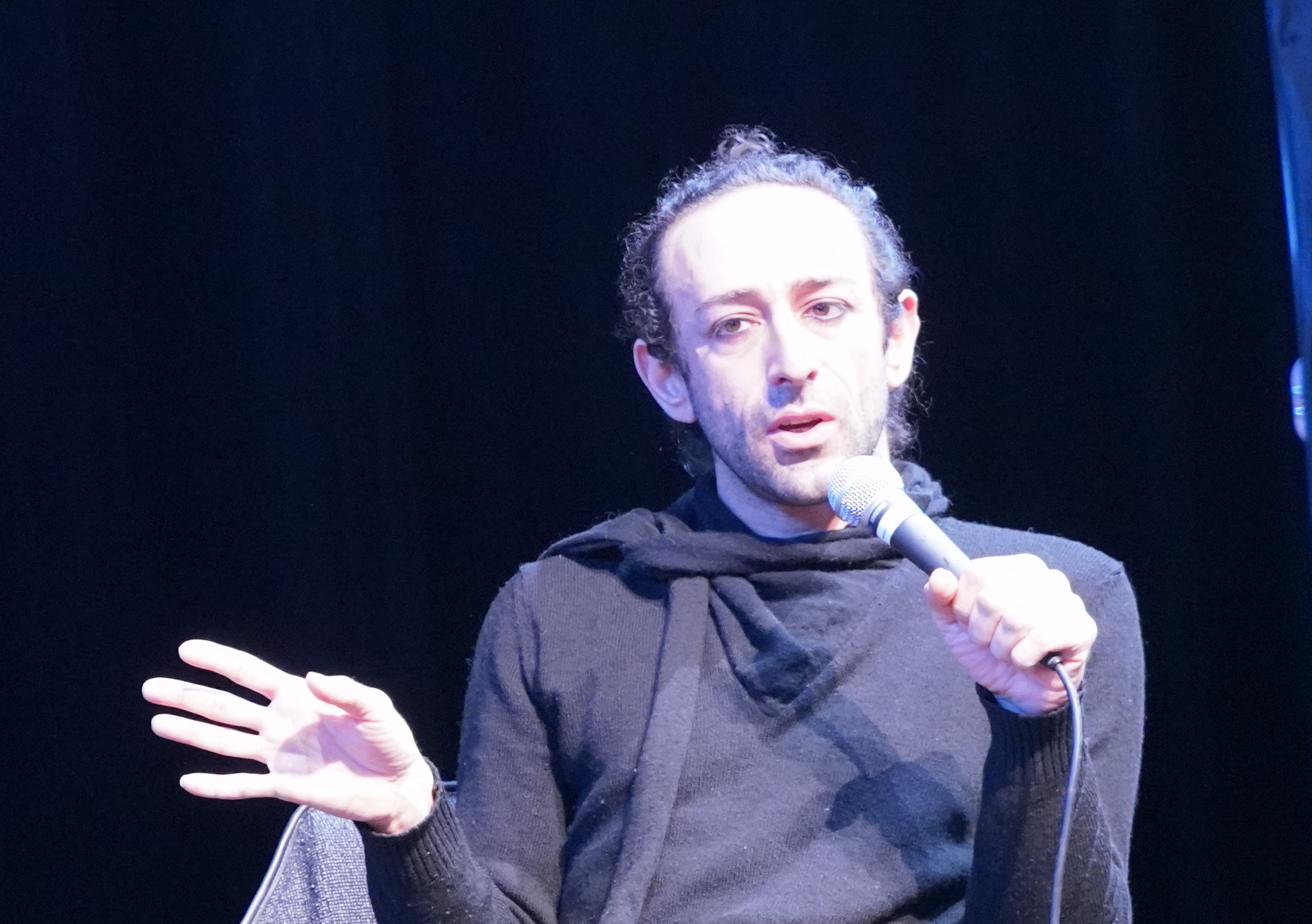
- Alexandre Paulikevitch in January 2022
- Born: Alexandre Paulikevitch; 20 February 1982 Beirut, Lebanon
- Occupation: Dancer, choreographer
- Period: 2009–present
- Genre: Baladi dance

Alexandre Paulikevitch (Arabic: الكسندر بوليكيفيتش; born February 20, 1982, in Beirut, Lebanon) is a Lebanese artist living in Beirut, Lebanon. He is one of very few male Arab belly dancers, and is known for his thought provoking work and the social issues he tackles through his art. He studied at the University of Paris VIII majoring in Theater and Dance.

He returned to Beirut in 2006, where he is now permanently based, and has since "been creating spaces of reflection on Middle-Eastern dance through his work as a choreographer, a teacher and a performer". Today he specializes in contemporary Baladi dance, a new dance form he has created and divulged.

== Early life and career ==
Paulikevitch was born in Lebanon where he grew up in a conservative Armenian Christian neighborhood of Beirut. He embraced his sexuality early-on and came out as a homosexual man to his friends and family at the age of 16. His solo debut in Beirut was in 2009 with “Mouhawala Oula” (Arabic for "First Try") with which he begins to challenge gender stereotypes.

=== Homosexuality ===
Although a relatively progressive country in the Middle East, homosexuality has not yet been decriminalized in Lebanon. As a male with a feminine demeanor, he is often the target of derogatory catcalls when in public. In one of his first solo shows, entitled Tajwal, Paulikevitch dances to a compilation of insults directed at him on the streets of Beirut, turning his suffering into art.

=== Gender ===
Paulikevitch's work also redefines "gender roles through oriental dance". As a male dancer of Baladi, he uses his body to question gender stereotypes in the Middle East.

=== Activism ===
Beyond his dance practice, Paulikevitch is an active member of the civil society in Lebanon and a visible participant of multiple civil rights marches and protests. During the 2019–2020 Lebanese protests, also known locally as the October Revolution, Alexandre was violently arrested and detained by the riot police after participating in a public protest on the eve of January 14, 2020. He was summoned to military court, setting a precedent in a series of military tribunal convocations for citizens arrested during the protests. Paulikevitch's experience of arrest and detention inspired his show "A'alehom", during which he expresses his personal grief and the difficult year that was 2020. His work has been described as a "call to revolution", and he has been called the "militant dancer."

==== Controversy and fundamentalist threats ====
In September 2025, advertisement for "Cabaret Paulikevitch", a creation by the dancer defying gender roles, angered fundamentalist movements in Lebanon. Videos circulated on social media by right-wing agitators known as Soldiers of God and Sunni Islamists accused Paulikevitch of “promoting homosexuality,” through his choice of dresses and dance moves, which they perceive as exclusive to women. Following the campaign, State Security asked the venue, Metro al-Madina, to cancel the show, arguing that “the country is not ready yet for this kind” of performance. Paulikevitch refused to capitulate and launched a public campaign asking for support from the Lebanese Ministry of Culture (Lebanon). His public campaign proved successful, securing not only police protection but also additional support from Metro al-Madina's management, who provided extra security measures for the performance. On the night of the show, agitators representing "the Islamic Group in Tariq al-Jadida" delivered a statement in front of Metro al-Madina's entrance calling for "preserving the land that was never a breeding ground for corruption, deviance, and indecency." They were subsequently dispersed by security forces present. The Lebanese dancer ultimately prevailed and performed his show to a sold-out audience.

== Baladi career ==
Known as "the most famous male Baladi dancer", Paulikevitch is also perceived as the "precursor" of the dance form. His shows are often inspired by personal experiences of traumas, and have been received by audiences and critics with great success. He is one of few Arab baladi dancers to perform on international stages and as part of large dance festivals. In 2022, his performance "Cabaret Welbeek" was selected as the show to watch in the Festival LEGS, and was described as "the peak of a playful mix between joy, poetry and subversion."

=== Baladi appellation ===
One of the main missions Paulikevitch claims for himself is to battle what he describes as 'the colonial designation' of 'Belly Dance'. In describing his work, he aims to reclaim the native significance and original Egyptian appellation Baladi — Arabic for my country or land. His main critique is that the term 'Belly Dance' was created through the colonial gaze to eroticize this dance, condemning it as female and suggestive. As a male Arab dancer within this tradition, he combats these stereotypes, thus reclaiming a space for a male figure in a female dominated world. In 2017, he influenced the Centre Pompidou to use the term "Baladi" instead of Belly Dance in their show "Move / Hips don't lie", a retrospective of the dance's history.

== Acting ==
In addition to his career as a dancer and choreographer, Paulikevitch made his acting debut in the play The Sun Thief (arabic: سارق الشّمس), written and directed by Hashem Hashem. In the production, he embodies a character who struggles to protect his precious tree, Zayzafouneh. Critics praised his "surprising" acting abilities, noting his masterful use of voice, body, and imagination, and observed how he had seamlessly integrated his own personal struggles into the heart of the performance.

== Features ==
Paulikevitch was featured locally and internationally in many outlets. This includes an episode of the Netflix series We Speak Dance, hosted by Vandana Hart and filmed in Beirut; a New York Times article, "Coming Out in Lebanon" about openly queer and transsexual individuals in Lebanon, a BBC Culture documentary, The Male Belly Dancer Fighting Gender Stereotypes; and a short documentary about his food cooking and preservation techniques entitled "Tastes of Loss" by Romy Lynn Attieh.

== Selected works ==
=== Solo shows ===
- “Mouhawala Oula” (Arabic: محاولة اولة), Debut: 2009
- Tajwal (Arabic: تجوال), Debut: 2011
- ELGHA (Arabic: إلغاء), Debut: 2013
- Baladi ya Wad (Arabic: بلدي يا واد), Debut: 2015
- A'alehom (Arabic: عليهم), Debut: 2020
- Cabaret Welbeek (Arabic: كاباري والبيك), Debut: 2022
- A nos mères, Debut: 2024
- Cabaret Sursock by Alexandre Paulikevitch, Debut: 2024
- Cabaret Paulikevitch (Arabic: كاباري بوليكيفيتش), Debut: 2025

=== Collaborative shows ===
- Poster session / school - Festival d'Avignon, a collaboration with dancers/choreographers: Christine De Smedt, Simone Forti, Xavier Le Roy, Mette Ingvartsen; directors: Jan Ritsema et Cyril Teste; rapper: DGIZ; author and playwright: Bojana Cvejic; essayist: Charlotte Nordmann; and director of the École supérieure d'art d'Avignon (ESAA): Jean-Marc Ferrari, Debut: 2011
- SKINOUT, a collaboration with Cecilia Bengolea, François Chaignaud, Ylva Falk, Elisa Yvelin, Naïs Haidar, Alex Mugler, Debut: 2012
- Palais de Femme, a collaboration with Joelle Khoury and Chaghig Arzoumanian, Debut: 2014
- Dresse le Pour moi (Arabic: فأدِّبْهُ لي), a collaboration with Nancy Naous, Debut: 2018
- The Last Distance, a collaboration with Hashem Hashem, Debut: 2018

== See also ==
- LGBT rights in Lebanon
