= Danielle Arbid =

French film director

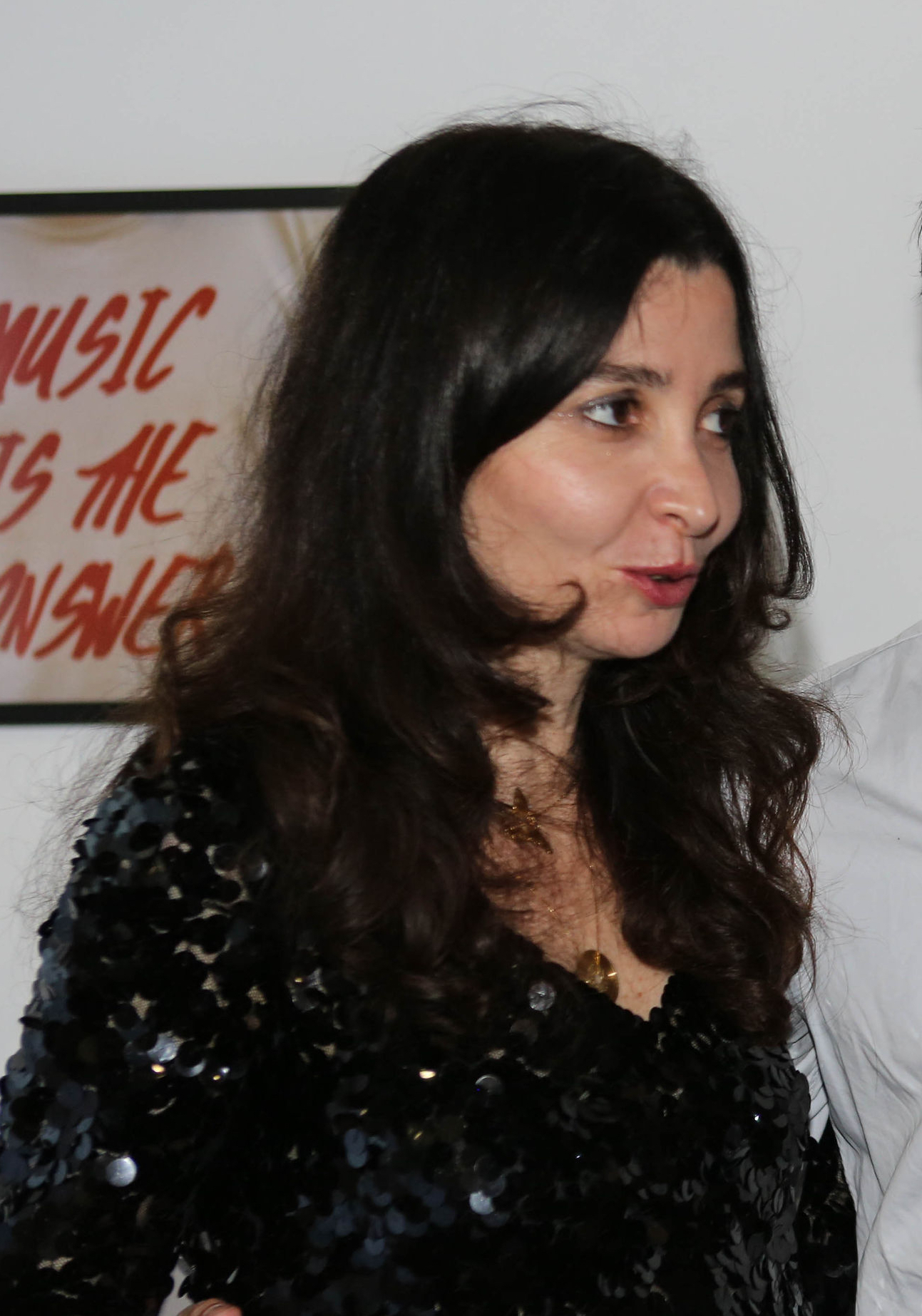
- Born: Danielle Arbid; Beirut, Lebanon
- Citizenship: French
- Occupation: Film director

Danielle Arbid is a French filmmaker of Lebanese origin who has been directing films since 1997.

Her work has been selected for numerous film festivals, including Cannes Film Festival, Toronto FF, New York FF, San Francisco, Locarno Festival, Busan and San Sebastián Film Festival. Danielle Arbid's Simple Passion, her fourth feature, was listed in the Cannes official selection, in 2020. Her first two features, Dans les champs de bataille and Un homme perdu, were screened at the Directors' Fortnight at the Cannes Festival in 2004 and in 2007, as well as in around thirty other festivals, picking up numerous awards, including the Directors' Fortnight Prize and the Milan Grand Prize or the Reflet d’Or at Cinéma-tout-écran, Genève.

Her documentaries and other filmed essays have been given an excellent reception and won dozens of awards including the Gold Leopard for Conversations de Salon at the Locarno Festival and the Silver Leopard also at the Locarno Festival for video for Seule avec la Guerre in 2001 and 2004 respectively, as well as the Albert Londres Prize, and the Villa Medici Hors les murs Award for Aux Frontières.

Danielle Arbid is representing Lebanon at the 2022 Edition of the 59th Venice Biennale. - The Lebanese pavilion has been nominated as one of the "Top 15 Pavilions not-to-be-missed" by the Financial Times, Le Monde, the Art Newspaper and the Quotidien de l'Art.

== Early life and education ==
Danielle Arbid left Lebanon at the height of the civil war in 1987, at the age of 17, to study literature at the Sorbonne University in Paris, France. She also studied journalism.

== Career ==
She directed her first short Raddem and the documentary Seule avec la guerre (1999). Having never studied film in school, Arbid says her inspiration comes from "art, photography, people in the street and of course film".

Her first three Conversation de Salon I-III where featured at the Museum of Applied Arts in Vienna, Austria and received the Golden Leopard at the Locarno Film Festival. Interested in different narrative forms, her work alternates between; fiction, first person documentaries and video essays; with an experimentation of the intersecting of genres. She was one of the founding members of the Lebanese film festival Né à Beyrouth in 2001.

In 2011, Danielle Arbid also directed the Beirut Hotel TV-movie for Arte aired during prime time, becoming one of the channel's most popular fiction broadcasts in 2012.

Her third fiction feature, Parisienne won the Académie Lumière foreign press prize, as well as other awards including the Best Actress prize at Les Arcs in 2016. Parisienne (film) had its world première at the Toronto International Film Festival.

Simple Passion is her fourth feature film. It's an adaptation from the major French writer Annie Ernauxs best-seller book. Simple Passion was selected by the Cannes Film Festival in 2020. It was also selected in the San Sebastián International Film Festival, Toronto International Film Festival, Zurich Film Festival, Busan International Film Festival, Les Arcs Film Festival, Lisboa & Cintra Film Festival, and the Lumière Festival. Simple Passion obtained rave reviews from the international press - including The Telegraph, the Guardian, TimeOut, Culture Fix, Sight and Sound, Film Hounds, Film Threat.

Five retrospectives have been held around Danielle Arbid's films at the Gijón International Film Festival in 2007, Bastia Festival in 2007, Paris Cinéma in 2007, the Festival de la Fiction at La Rochelle, France, in 2008 and Festival Dei Popoli Florence in 2016.

Her videos were presented at the Centre Pompidou, the Vienna Museum of Art, the MAC VAL, Fondation Boghossian (Belgium), and the Musée des Beaux-Arts de Rennes (France).

In 2018, she also directed Le Feu au cœur, a short film for the Paris Opéra.

A documentary about her work titled "Danielle Arbid, un chant de bataille" was produced in 2017 in the prestigious collection "Cinéastes de notre temps" created by André S. Labarthe, former critic of Cahiers du Cinéma.

As an actress, she has worked in few films, including The Apaches (2013) and Repair the Living (2015).

She is also an art photographer who exhibited at numerous galleries, including the Galerie Cinéma in Paris, Photomed Beirut, and Rouge L'Expo.

== Filmography ==
- 1998: Raddem (Short, fiction,17')
- 1999: Le passeur (Short, fiction, 13')
- 2000: Seule avec la guerre [60'] (documentary)
- 2002: Étrangère (Fiction, 46')
- 2002: Aux frontières [60'](Documentary)
- 2004: In the battlefields (Feature)
- 2004: Nous / Nihna [2004, 13']
- 2004: Conversation de Salon 1, 2 et 3 [3x10']
- 2007: A lost man (Feature)
- 2008: This smell of sex [21']
- 2009: Conversation de salon 4, 5 et 6 [3x10']
- 2011: Beirut Hotel [99'] (TV Feature)
- 2015: Parisienne (Peur de rien) (Premiere in TIFF)
- 2020: Simple Passion
- 2026: Only Rebels Win

== Awards and recognition ==
- Golden Leopard - Video 2004 at Locarno International Film Festival/ Conversation de salon 1–2–3.
- Cannes Film Festival 2004, la Directors' Fortnight / Prix Europa / Dans les Champs de bataille (In the Battlefields)
- Silver Leopard - Video 2000 at Locarno International Film Festival/ Seule avec la guerre.
- Albert Londres Prize (French Pulitzer) 2001
- Chevalier of the Order of Arts and Letters
- Best actor award at Mons Festival 1999
- European Youth Jury Award 2000 at Angers European First Film Festival/ Le Passeur 2000
- Prize of the Ecumenical Jury 2000 at Leipzig DOK Festival/ Seule avec la guerre 2000
- Mediterranean Documentary Prize Calibre 2001
- Grant Villa Médicis Hors-les-murs / Aux Frontières 2002
- Grand Prix at the Vendôme Festival / Étrangère 2002
- Honourable Mention at Oberhausen International Short Film Festival / Conversation de salon 1 2003
- Grand Prix at the Milan Festival 2004.
- IMA Grand Prize at Paris Biennal of Arab Cinema/ Dans les champs de bataille 2004
- GTC laboratories Prize at Montpellier Festival 2004
- 16th Mention spéciale du Jury at NATfilm Festival Copenhagen, Denmark, 2005
- Mention spéciale du Jury at New Voices/New Visions Grand Jury Prize at Palm Springs International Film Festival 2005
- Prix du Jeune jury au festival de Bastia pour Peur de rien / Parisienne 2015
- Prix de l'Académie Lumière, de la presse étrangère en France pour Peur de rien / Parisienne
- Best First Film Prize at Hot Docs Toronto
- Jury Honourable Mention at Dei Popoli Festival, Florence.
- Reflet d'Or of the Perspectives section at the Festival Cinéma-tout-écran, Geneva.
- Bayard d'Or of the best script at Namur Festival, Belgium.
- Lady Harimaguada de Plata Prize and José Rivero Prize of the best first film at the Festival Las Palmas de Gran Canarias, Spain.
- Special Prize of the jury at Carthage Festival.
- Best Script Grant at Montpellier Festival.
- First work Prize at Tetouan Festival.
- Bos'art - Festival del cinema delle culture mediterranee,
- Prix d'interprétation féminine au Festival des Arcs pour Peur de rien / Parisienne
- Prix de l'Académie Lumière, de la presse étrangère en France pour Peur de rien / Parisienne
- Prix Alice Guy at the Marseille Festival of Documentary Film pour J'ai Donné A Mon Coeur Une Médaille Pour T'Avoir Oublié

== See also ==
- List of female film and television directors

== Bibliography ==
- Cinéma de Notre Temps : Danielle Arbid – Un chant de bataille — Cinéma du Réel [archive]
- Armes, Roy. "Danielle Arbid." Arab Filmmakers of the Middle East: A Dictionary. Bloomington, IN: Indiana UP, 2010. 68–69.
- Hillauer, Rebecca. Encyclopedia of Arab Women Filmmakers. Cairo: American University in Cairo, 2005. 142–143.
- Westmoreland, Mark Ryan. Crisis of Representation: Experimental Documentary in Postwar Lebanon. University of Texas, 2008 164-165
