= Karim Aïnouz =

Brazilian film director (born 1966)

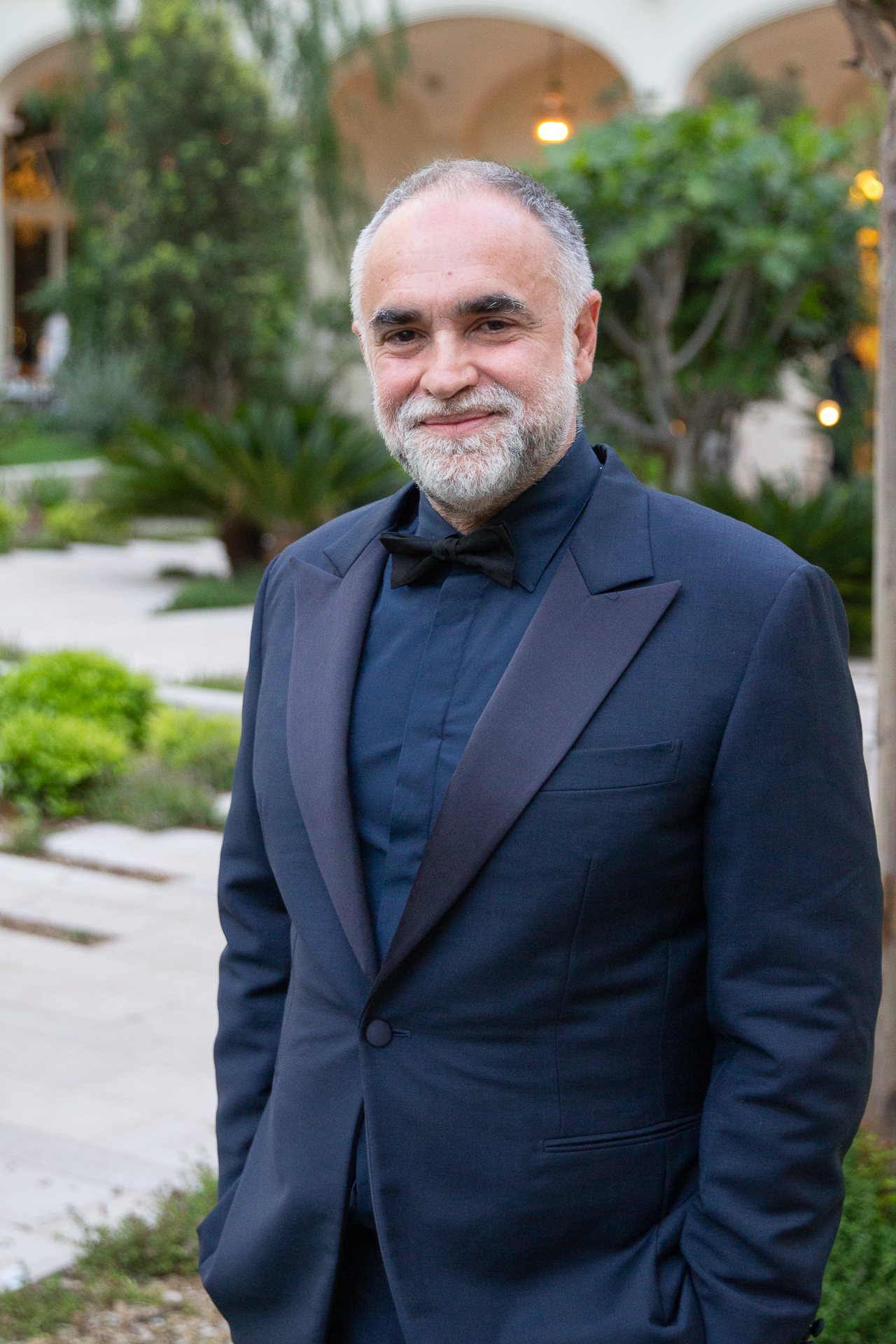
- Aïnouz in 2024
- Born: 17 January 1966 (age 60); Fortaleza, Ceará, Brazil
- Occupation: Film director
- Years active: 1992–present
- Known for: The Invisible Life of Eurídice Gusmão

Karim Aïnouz (/kəˈriːm aɪˈnuːz/; Portuguese: [kɐˈɾĩ ajˈnus]; born 17 January 1966) is a Brazilian film director and visual artist. He is best known for his film The Invisible Life of Eurídice Gusmão.

== Career ==
Karim Aïnouz was born to a Brazilian mother and an Algerian father, in Fortaleza, Ceará, in the Brazilian Northeast. He is a film director, screenwriter and visual artist.

Aïnouz's feature debut, Madame Satã, premiered at the Un Certain Regard section of the 2002 Cannes Film Festival.

His following films, Suely in the Sky, and I Travel Because I Have to, I Come Back Because I Love You, co-directed with Marcelo Gomes, premiered at the Orizzonti of the in 2006 and 2009 Venice Film Festival.

In 2011, The Silver Cliff was presented in the Directors' Fortnight and won Best Director at the Rio de Janeiro International Film Festival.

In television, Aïnouz created and directed Alice, a 13 episode fiction series for HBO Brasil. His short films and installations have been shown at numerous venues including The Whitney Museum of American Art, the São Paulo Biennial, the Sharjah Biennial and Videobrasil.

As creative advisor and lecturer, Aïnouz has been invited to numerous Screenwriters Labs and institutions such as Princeton University, Wexner Center for the Arts, MIT, EICTV among others. Karim Aïnouz has been developing, alongside fellow filmmakers Marcelo Gomes and Sérgio Machado, The Center for Audiovisual Narratives in partnership with State authorities of Ceará, Brazil. Among other activities, they coordinate and work as creative advisors to the Screenwriters Lab, a one-year program committed to the development of a new generation of filmmakers, providing support throughout their projects. Since 2017, Aïnouz is a member of the Academy of Motion Picture Arts and Sciences.

Karim Aïnouz documentary Zentralflughafen THF, premiered at the 68th Berlinale – Panorama, won the Amnesty International Film Award, and has been screened in over 10 festivals. His previous feature Futuro Beach, had its world premiere at the 64th Berlinale Competition.

In 2019 he released The Invisible Life of Eurídice Gusmão, an adaptation of the Brazilian novel A Vida Invisivel de Eurídice Gusmão, written by Martha Batalha, depicting the struggle of two sisters against repression and bigotry in the 1950s Rio de Janeiro. The film was screened at the Un Certain Regard section of the 2019 Cannes Film Festival, where it won the section top prize. In 2021, Aïnouz released his third documentary, Mariner of the Mountains, which followed his search for his Algerian roots in Algiers, the homeland of his father.

In 2023, Aïnouz released his English language debut film, Firebrand, as part of the main competition of the 2023 Cannes Film Festival. The film follows the final years of Henry VIII's reign and his wife Catherine Parr.

In 2024, he went back to the Brazilian Northeast with the erotic thriller Motel Destino, set in his hometown Fortaleza. The film had its world premiere at the 2024 Cannes Film Festival, where it competed for the Palme D'Or.

Aïnouz followed with Rosebush Pruning (2026), his second English language feature film, written by Efthimis Filippou and loosely based on the 1965 film Fists in the Pocket by Marco Bellocchio. The film had its world premiere at the main competition of the 76th Berlin International Film Festival, where it was nominated for the Golden Bear.

=== Upcoming films ===
In 2026, Aïnouz announced the pre-production of Lana Jaguaribe, a new Brazilian production set in Ceará (his home state) and a companion piece to Motel Destino. It's set in 1870 during the Great Drought in the Brazilian Northeast and shortly before the abolition of slavery. The film is expected to start filming in early 2027.

== Filmography ==
=== Feature film ===
Year	English Title	Original Title	Notes
2002	Madam Satan	Madame Satã	
2006	Suely in the Sky	O Céu de Suely	
2009	I Travel Because I Have to, I Come Back Because I Love You	Viajo Porque Preciso, Volto Porque te Amo	Co-directed with Marcelo Gomes
2011	The Silver Cliff	O Abismo Prateado	
2014	Futuro Beach	Praia do Futuro	
2019	The Invisible Life of Eurídice Gusmão	A Vida Invisível de Eurídice Gusmão	
2023	Firebrand		English language debut
2024	Motel Destino		
2026	Rosebush Pruning		
TBA	Lana Jaguaribe		Pre-production

==== Only writer ====
Year	English Title	Original Title
2001	Behind the Sun	Abril Despedaçado
2005	Lower City	Cidade Baixa
2005	Cinema, Aspirins and Vultures	Cinema, Aspirinas e Urubus
2006	Love for Sale	

=== Documentary film ===
- Velázquez (2015)
- Zentralflughafen THF (2018)
- Mariner of the Mountains (2021)

=== Short film ===
Year	Title	Director	Writer
1992	O Preso	Yes	Yes
1994	Paixão Nacional	Yes	Yes
1996	Hic Habitat Felicitas	Yes	Yes
2000	Rifa-me	Yes	No
2004	Se fosse tudo sempre assim	Yes	No
2011	Sunny Lane	Yes	Yes
2011	Destricted.br	Yes	Yes
2019	30/30 Vision: 3 Decades of Strand Releasing (segment "A Peaceful Revolution Is on the Rise")	Yes	Yes

=== Documentary short ===
Year	Title	Director	Writer
1993	Seams	Yes	Yes
1998	Les Ballons des Bairros	Yes	No
2004	Sertão de Acrílico Azul Piscina	Yes	Yes
2014	Sunday	Yes	Yes

=== TV series ===
Year	Title	Director	Writer	Notes
2008	Alice	Yes	No	Episode "O Primeiro Dia Do Resto Da Minha Vida"
2014	Cathedrals of Culture	Yes	Yes	Episode "Centre Pompidou"

== Awards ==
- 1994: Award for Best Short, Atlanta Film Festival, for Seams
- 1997: Award for Best Short, Ann Arbor Film Festival, for Seams
- 2002: Award for Best Director, Biarritz Film Festival, for Madame Satã
- 2002: Award for Best Director, São Paulo Association of Art Critics Awards, for Madame Satã
- 2002: Gold Hugo, Chicago International Film Festival, for Madame Satã
- 2006: Grand Coral Award, Havana Film Festival, for Love for Sale
- 2006: Award for Best Director, Rio International Film Festival, for Love for Sale
- 2006: Award for Best Film, Rio International Film Festival, for Love for Sale
- 2006: FIPRESCI Award, 47th Thessaloniki International Film Festival, for Love for Sale
- 2009: Award for Best Director, Rio International Film Festival, for I Travel Because I Have To, I Come Back Because I Love You
- 2009: FIPRESCI Award, Havana Film Festival, for I Travel Because I Have To, I Come Back Because I Love You
- 2009: Third Grand Coral Award, Havana Film Festival, for I Travel Because I Have To, I Come Back Because I Love You
- 2010: Grand Prix Coup de Coeur, 22º Rencontres Cinémas d'Amérique Latin (Toulouse/France), for I Travel Because I Have To, I Come Back Because I Love You co-directed with Marcelo Gomes.
- 2011: Award for Best Director, Rio International Film Festival, for The Silver Cliff
- 2011: Second Grand Coral Award, Havana Film Festival, for The Silver Cliff
- 2018: Amnesty International Film Prize, Berlinale, for Zentralflughafen THF
- 2019: Prix Un Certain Regard for The Invisible Life of Eurídice Gusmão
