= Alice Rohrwacher =

Italian filmmaker

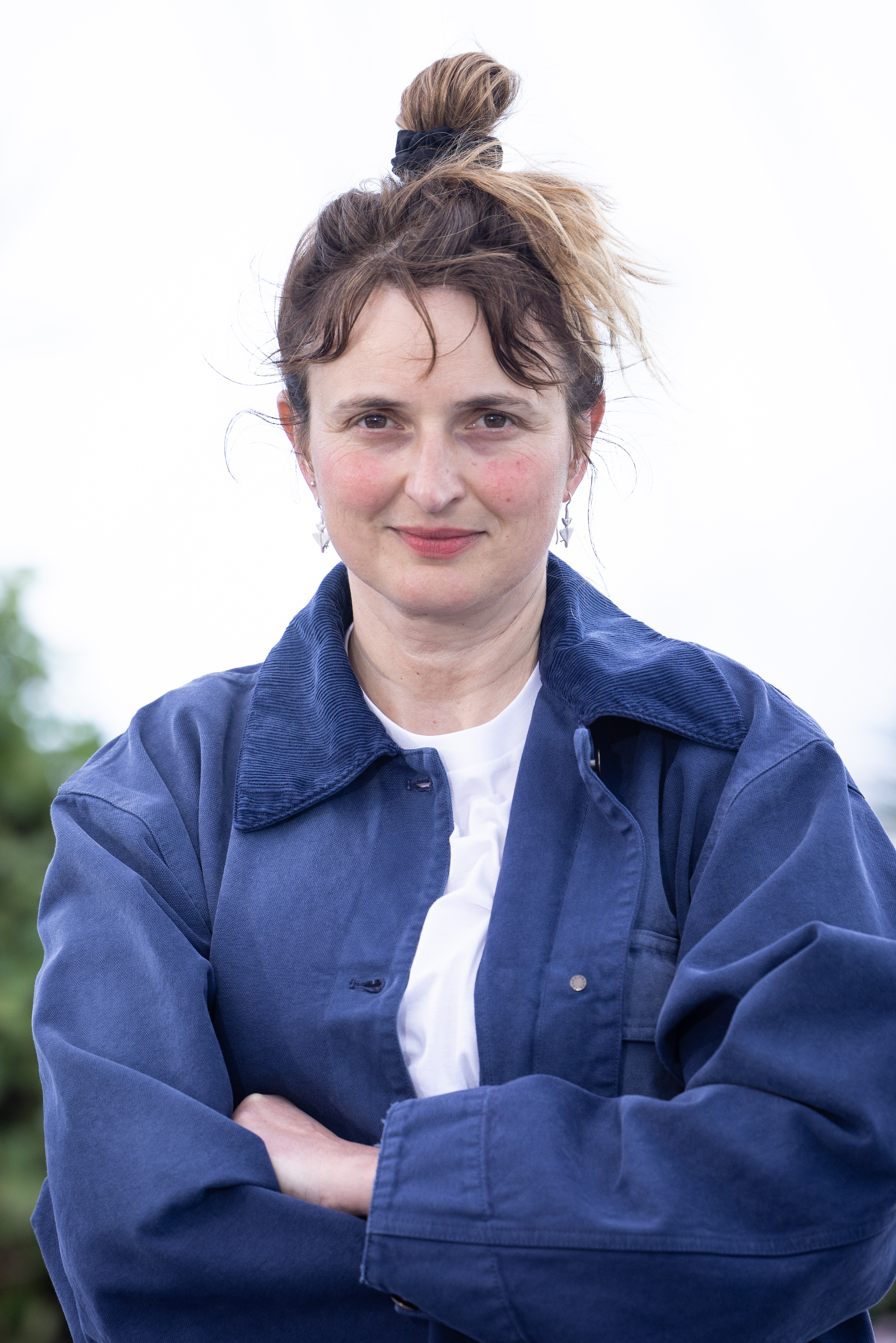
- Alice Rohrwacher at the 2025 Cannes Film Festival
- Born: 29 December 1981 (age 44); Fiesole, Tuscany, Italy
- Education: University of Turin
- Occupations: Filmmaker, screenwriter, editor
- Years active: 2005–present
- Relatives: Alba Rohrwacher (sister)

Alice Rohrwacher (Italian: [aˈliːtʃe rorˈvaːker], German: [ˈʁoːɐ̯vaxɐ]; born 29 December 1981) is an Italian filmmaker, editor and screenwriter. She made her directorial debut in 2011 with Heavenly Body and gained international attention with The Wonders, which won the Grand Prix at the 2014 Cannes Film Festival.

She received further acclaim for Happy as Lazzaro (2018), winner of the Best Screenplay at the 71st Cannes Film Festival, and for La chimera (2023), which competed for the Palme d'Or at the 76th Cannes Film Festival.

Her short film Le pupille (2022) was nominated for the Academy Award for Best Live Action Short Film. In 2026, she will receive the European Film Academy Achievement in World Cinema Award.

== Early life ==
Rohrwacher was born on 29 December 1981 in Fiesole, Tuscany, to an Italian mother and a German father, Reinhard Rohrwacher, who worked as a beekeeper. She grew up in the rural village of Castel Giorgio, Umbria, where her mother was born and where the family maintained a close connection to agricultural and artisanal traditions. These early experiences, marked by communal living, spirituality and the countryside lifestyle, would later strongly influence the themes and imagery of her films.

Her older sister, Alba Rohrwacher, became a prominent Italian actress and has appeared in several of Alice's films, creating a recurring artistic collaboration. Rohrwacher studied Classics at the University of Turin before specializing in screenwriting at the Scuola Holden in Turin.

== Career ==
Rohrwacher's first experience in filmmaking came in 2006, when she directed a segment of the Italian documentary Checosamanca, a collaborative project exploring contemporary youth culture in Italy.

In 2011, she made her feature film debut with Heavenly Body (Corpo celeste), which premiered in the Directors' Fortnight section at the 2011 Cannes Film Festival to critical acclaim. The film introduced many of Rohrwacher's stylistic trademarks, including naturalistic performances, spiritual themes and depictions of adolescence.

Her second feature, The Wonders (Le meraviglie), premiered in competition at the 2014 Cannes Film Festival and won the Grand Prix, gaining her international recognition. In the same year, she was appointed President of the International Jury for the "Luigi De Laurentiis" Venice Award for a Debut Film at the 71st Venice International Film Festival.

In 2015, Rohrwacher directed the short film De Djess, part of the Miu Miu Women's Tales series, starring Alba Rohrwacher and Yanet Mojica. The film premiered at the Venice Film Festival's Giornate degli Autori and New York Fashion Week, exploring a magical dress in a surreal seaside hotel setting.

In 2017, Rohrwacher began production on her third feature, Happy as Lazzaro (Lazzaro felice), starring Sergi López and her sister Alba Rohrwacher. The film premiered at the 2018 Cannes Film Festival, where Rohrwacher won the award for Best Screenplay. Happy as Lazzaro was later released internationally on Netflix in December of that year.

In June 2018, Rohrwacher was invited to become a member of the Academy of Motion Picture Arts and Sciences. She later served on the jury of the 2019 Cannes Film Festival.

Her short film Le pupille (2022), produced by Alfonso Cuarón, premiered at the 79th Venice International Film Festival and was nominated for the Academy Award for Best Live Action Short Film.

Rohrwacher's fourth feature, La chimera, starring Josh O'Connor and Isabella Rossellini, premiered at the 2023 Cannes Film Festival where it competed for the Palme d'Or.

In 2024, she co-directed the short film An Urban Allegory with JR, which premiered out of competition at the 81st Venice International Film Festival.

In 2025, Rohrwacher was appointed Jury President of the Caméra d'Or at the 2025 Cannes Film Festival. In 2026, she is scheduled to receive the European Film Academy Achievement in World Cinema Award.

== Style ==
Rohrwacher's work is often described as a blend of magical realism and Italian neorealism, combining realistic depictions of rural life with elements of the fantastic.

Her films frequently focus on adolescence and youth, exploring the inner lives of young characters as they navigate moral, social and spiritual challenges.

She often sets her stories in small towns or rural communities in Italy, highlighting traditional customs and local landscapes. Critics note her use of long takes, natural lighting and unobtrusive camerawork, which enhances the immersive realism of her narratives.

Themes of community, social inequality, and the intersection between innocence and corruption recur throughout her work. Additionally, she frequently collaborates with actors she knows personally, including her sister Alba Rohrwacher, creating a sense of intimacy and authenticity in performances.

== Filmography ==
=== Feature films ===
Year	English Title	Original Title	Director	Screenwriter	Notes
2011	Heavenly Body	Corpo celeste	Yes	Yes	
2014	The Wonders	Le meraviglie	Yes	Yes	Grand Prix at the 2014 Cannes Film Festival
2018	Happy as Lazzaro	Lazzaro Felice	Yes	Yes	Best Screenplay at the 2018 Cannes Film Festival
2023	La chimera		Yes	Yes	
TBA	The Three Incestuous Sisters		Yes	Yes	Post-production

=== Documentaries ===
Year	Title	Director	Screenwriter	Notes
2006	Checosamanca	Yes	No	Italian documentary exploring youth culture
2014	9x10 novanta	Yes	Yes	segment: "Una canzone"
2021	Futura	Yes	No	Co-directed with Pietro Marcello and Francesco Munzi

=== Short films ===
Year	Title	Director	Screenwriter	Notes
2015	De Djess	Yes	Yes	Part of Miu Miu Women's Tales series, premiered at the Venice Film Festival
2022	Le pupille	Yes	Yes	Nominated for Academy Award for Best Live Action Short Film; produced by Alfonso Cuarón
2024	An Urban Allegory	Yes	Yes	Premiered out of competition at 81st Venice International Film Festival; co-directed with JR

=== Other work ===
Year	Title	Director	Screenwriter	Cinematographer	Editor	Notes
2005	Un piccolo spettacolo	No	Yes	Yes	Yes	Documentary film
2008	Boygo	No	No	No	Yes	Short film
2008	Tradurre	No	No	No	Yes	Documentary film
2009	In tempo, ma rubato	No	No	No	Yes	Documentary film
2009	Residuo fisso	No	No	Yes	Yes	Documentary short
2020	My Brilliant Friend	Yes	No	No	No	Television series; 2 episodes
2020	Ad una mela	Yes	No	No	No	Trailer for the Vienna International Film Festival

== Awards and nominations ==
Award	Year	Category	Work	Result	Ref.
Academy Awards	2022	Best Live Action Short Film	Le pupille	Nominated	
Abu Dhabi Film Festival	2014	Black Pearl Award	The Wonders	Won	
British Independent Film Awards	2024	Best International Independent Film	La chimera	Nominated	
Cannes Film Festival	2011	Caméra d'Or	Heavenly Body	Nominated	
Cannes Film Festival	2014	Grand Prix	The Wonders	Won	
Cannes Film Festival	2018	Best Screenplay	Happy as Lazzaro	Won	
Cannes Film Festival	2021	L'Œil d'or	Futura	Nominated	
Cannes Film Festival	2023	Palme d'Or	La chimera	Nominated	
Chicago International Film Festival	2018	Gold Hugo	Happy as Lazzaro	Won	
Chicago International Film Festival	2023	Gold Hugo	La Chimera	Nominated	
Ciak d'oro	2012	Best First Feature	eavenly Body	Won	
Ciak d'oro	2023	Best Film – Drama	La chimera	Nominated	
Ciak d'oro	2023	Best Director	La chimera	Nominated	
David di Donatello	2011	Best New Director	Heavenly Body	Nominated	
David di Donatello	2019	Best Film	Happy as Lazzaro	Nominated	
David di Donatello	2019	Best Director	Happy as Lazzaro	Nominated	
David di Donatello	2019	Best Original Screenplay	Happy as Lazzaro	Nominated	
David di Donatello	2022	Best Documentary	Futura	Nominated	
David di Donatello	2024	Best Film	La chimera	Nominated	
David di Donatello	2024	Best Director	La chimera	Nominated	
David di Donatello	2024	Best Original Screenplay	La chimera	Nominated	
European Film Awards	2018	European Film	Happy as Lazzaro	Nominated	
European Film Awards	2018	European Director	Happy as Lazzaro	Nominated	
European Film Awards	2018	European Screenwriter	Happy as Lazzaro	Nominated	
European Film Awards	2018	European University Film Award	Happy as Lazzaro	Won	
European Film Awards	2026	European Achievement in World Cinema		Won	
Filmfest München	2014	CineVision Award	The Wonders	Won	
Gothenburg Film Festival	2012	Ingmar Bergman International Debut Award	Heavenly Body	Won	
Globo d'oro	2019	Best Director	Happy as Lazzaro	Nominated	
Globo d'oro	2019	Best Screenplay	Happy as Lazzaro	Nominated	
Globo d'oro	2024	Best Director	La chimera	Nominated	
Independent Spirit Awards	2019	Best International Film	Happy as Lazzaro	Nominated	
London Film Critics' Circle Award	2024	Film of the Year	La chimera	Nominated	
London Film Critics' Circle Award	2024	Foreign Language Film of the Year	La chimera	Nominated	
Manchester Film Festival	2024	Golden Bee for Best Feature Film	La chimera	Won	
Nastro d'Argento	2011	Best New Director	Heavenly Body	Won	
Nastro d'Argento	2023	Nastro d’Argento speciale	Le pupille	Won	
Nastro d'Argento	2024	Best Director	La chimera	Nominated	
Nastro d'Argento	2024	Best Screenplay	La chimera	Nominated	
Telluride Film Festival	2023	Silver Medallion	—N/a	Won	
UK Film Festival	2018	Best Feature Film	Happy as Lazzaro	Nominated	
Valladolid International Film Festival	2023	Golden Spike Award	La chimera	Nominated	
Valladolid International Film Festival	2023	Silver Spike Award	La chimera	Won	
