= O Outro =

- Genre: Telenovela
- Created by: Aguinaldo Silva
- Directed by: Fred Confalonieri; Ingnácio Coqueiro
- Starring: Francisco Cuoco; Natália do Vale; Malu Mader; Yoná Magalhães; Beth Goulart; Herson Capri; Miguel Falabella; Marcos Frota; Eva Todor; José Lewgoy; Arlete Salles
- Opening theme: "Flores em você" by Ira!
- Country of origin: Brazil
- Original language: Portuguese
- No. of episodes: 173

Production
- Running time: 50 minutes

Original release
- Network: TV Globo
- Release: 23 March – 10 October 1987

Related
- Roda de Fogo; Mandala

O Outro is a Brazilian telenovela produced and broadcast by TV Globo. It premiered on 23 March 1987 and ended on 10 October 1987, with a total of 173 episodes. It's the thirty seventh "novela das oito" to be aired on the timeslot. It is created by Aguinaldo Silva and directed by Fred Confalonieri.

== Plot ==
The plot unfolds between the different worlds of two physically identical men in the city of Rio de Janeiro. Businessman Paulo Della Santa (Francisco Cuoco) is a man tormented by a family and business in crisis. His futile younger wife, Laura (Natália do Vale), struggles to keep the marriage together, despite Marília (Beth Goulart) and Pedro Ernesto (Marcos Frota), Paulo's children, cheering her on. Laura's brother, the unscrupulous João Silvério (Miguel Falabella), also does everything he can to get his hands on his brother-in-law's money.

Dealer Denizard de Mattos (Francisco Cuoco), the owner of a junkyard, is a simple figure from the suburbs of Rio de Janeiro. A bronco widower and the father of young Zezinha (Cláudia Abreu), he has a love affair with his secretary, India do Brasil (Yoná Magalhães). Denizard's partner, Nininho Americano (Tonico Pereira), and his partner, the thug Vidigal (Ewerton de Castro), want to turn the junkyard into a place to dismantle stolen cars, against the wishes of Denizard, an incorruptible man.

Paulo and Denizard, who live unaware that they are look-alikes - even though they live in the same place, Avenida Atlântica - end up meeting in the bathroom of a gas station, moments before the place explodes and catches fire, with Vidigal being the only one to witness the scene. Rescued in Paulo's place and mistaken for him, Denizard ends up taking the place of the businessman and, even after his secret is discovered, the farce is maintained in the interests of his adversaries who wanted to seize power from his double. However, taking advantage of the change of identity, Paulo decides to fight his way back and regain his rightful place.

Paulo, who has disappeared, is presumed dead, and Denizard, with amnesia, takes his place in the family and business, without anyone suspecting his true identity. On one side is Denizard's family, worried about his disappearance; on the other is Paulo's family, trying to reintegrate a man with no memory into everyone's life.

The change of identity of the look-alikes is no secret to the hippie Glorinha da Abolição (Malu Mader), a young woman who sells handicrafts on the Copacabana promenade and ends up falling in love with Denizard while he is under the identity of Paulo. She is the daughter of the housekeeper Vilma (Arlete Salles) and doesn't even imagine that she is the biological daughter of the real Paulo, a secret kept under lock and key by her mother, who is desperate to believe that Glorinha is getting involved with her own father.

In the Sobre as Ondas building, located in Copacabana, other characters from the plot cross paths: the beautiful Dodô (Ísis de Oliveira) and Dedé (Luma de Oliveira) who are mother and daughter; the gym teacher Cordeiro de Deus (Jonas Mello); the moralistic landlord Demerval (Lutero Luiz); the foul-mouthed ex-vedete Dona Liúba (Eva Todor); and the couple who live like cats and dogs, Edwiges (Cláudia Raia) and Genésio (José de Abreu). There is also a mystery surrounding the identity of Perfumado, a figure who stalks women around the neighborhood at night. In the end, it turns out to be Gato (Milton Rodrigues), owner of the bar where the characters used to meet.

== Cast ==
Actor	Character
Francisco Cuoco	Paulo Della Santa
Francisco Cuoco	Denizard de Mattos
Natália do Vale	Laura Della Santa
Malu Mader	Glorinha da Abolição
Yoná Magalhães	Índia do Brasil
Beth Goulart	Marília Della Santa
Cláudia Raia	Edwiges
Cláudia Abreu	Maria José de Mattos (Zezinha)
Ísis de Oliveira	Dodô
Luma de Oliveira	Dedé
Ilva Niño	Belmira
Herson Capri	Gabriel
Miguel Falabella	João Silvério
Cleyde Blota	Jurema
Marcos Frota	Pedro Ernesto Della Santa
José Lewgoy	Agostinho Della Santa
Eva Todor	Liúba
Wanda Kosmo	Yolanda
Arlete Salles	Vilma
Fernando Almeida	Lico
Cristina Galvão	Cida
Rosane Gofman	Monalisa
Flávio Galvão	Benjamin
Elaine Cristina	Ivete
Jonas Mello	Cordeiro de Deus
Ewerton de Castro	Vidigal
Stepan Nercessian	Delegado Barbosão
José de Abreu	Genésio
Tonico Pereira	Nininho Americano
Lutero Luiz	Demerval Parente
Eliana Ovalle	Alzira
Antônio Pompeo	Batista
Augusto Olympio	Cavaquinho
Milton Rodrigues	Gato
Melise Maia	Selma
Anselmo Lyra	Júnior
Carolina Moura	Bianca
Cláudio Ferrário	Baixinho
Valter Santos	Melo Mendonça
Cleonir dos Santos	Abraão
Adelaide Palete	Madalena
Josias de Almeida	Olegário
Luís Roberto	
Marina Lira	Lisete
Fernando José	
