= Feijão Maravilha =

- Genre: Telenovela
- Created by: Bráulio Pedroso
- Directed by: Paulo Ubiratan
- Opening theme: "O Preto que Satisfaz" - As Frenéticas
- Country of origin: Brazil
- Original language: Portuguese
- No. of episodes: 125

Production
- Running time: 40 minutes

Original release
- Network: TV Globo
- Release: 19 March – 3 August 1979

Related
- Pecado Rasgado; Marron Glacê

Feijão Maravilha is a Brazilian telenovela produced and broadcast by TV Globo. It premiered on 19 March 1979 and ended on 3 August 1979, with a total of 125 episodes. It's the twenty third "novela das sete" to be aired at the timeslot. It is created by Bráulio Pedroso and directed by Paulo Ubiratan.

== Cast ==
Actor	Character
Lucélia Santos	Eliana
Stepan Nercessian	Anselmo
Maria Cláudia	Abigail Andrade (Bibinha)
José Lewgoy	Ambrósio
José Lewgoy	Ambrásio (Sombra)
Eliana Macedo	Soraya
Anselmo Duarte	Trindade
Adelaide Chiozzo	Leonor
Grande Otelo	Benevides
Olney Cazarré	Oscar
Clarice Piovesan	Marilyn Meyer
Marco Nanini	Jorge (Jorginho)
Elizângela	Adelaide
Marcelo Picchi	Miró
Mauro Mendonça	Mr. Ziegfield
Mara Rúbia	Madame Fifi de Queiroz e Queiroz
Ivon Cury	Príncipe Rashid
Ênio Santos	Professor Giacometti
Nair Bello	Firmina Aragão
Brandão Filho	Prudêncio
Heloísa Helena	Margarida Andrade (Maggie)
Roberto Faissal	Augusto Andrade
Gracinda Freire	Antonieta
Older Cazarré	Neném Minhoca
Felipe Carone	Formoso
Walter D'Ávila	Scarface
Joséphine Hélene	Zuzu
Ilva Niño	Filomena
Ivan Setta	Coruja
Heloísa Millet	Carolina
Mário Cardoso	Ivan
Maria Cristina Nunes	Rosane
Dulce Conforto	Denise
Cláudio Savietto	Severino (Odara)
Maria Inês Sayão	Neuza
