= Ilva Niño =

Brazilian actress

- Born: Ilva Niño Mendonça; November 15, 1933; Floresta, Pernambuco, Brazil
- Died: June 12, 2024 (aged 90); Rio de Janeiro, Brazil
- Occupation: Actress • Theater director • Producer • Theater teacher
- Years active: 1956–2024
- Spouse: Luiz Mendonça (m. 1963; died 1995)
- Awards: National Amateur Festival; 1957: Best Actress – O Auto da Compadecida

Ilva Niño Mendonça (November 15, 1933 – June 12, 2024) was a Brazilian actress, director, and theater teacher. Throughout an artistic career that spanned eight decades, she was particularly notable in television and theater, immortalizing numerous characters, many of whom represented women from the Northeast or domestic workers.

In 1957, she won the Best Actress award at the National Amateur Festival for her performance in the play O Auto da Compadecida by Ariano Suassuna as the ‘Baker's Wife’. From then on, she continued to act in a series of plays, founding the Luiz Mendonça Ninõ Theater of Arts, a tribute to her husband, actor and director Luiz Mendonça (who died in 1995), where she taught art classes for many years.

From the 1970s onwards, she became a regular feature in various soap operas and programs on TV Globo, playing maids, housewives, and women from the Northeast, helpful women with strong personalities, such as the long-suffering Alzira in Pecado Capital, the dreamer Cotinha in Sem Lenço, sem Documento (No Handkerchief, No ID, 1978), the grumpy Iara in Partido Alto (1984), the religious Sister Teresa in Terra Nostra (1999), the cangaceira Cândida in Cordel Encantado (2011), and Epifânia from Piauí in Cheias de Charme (2012). However, in 1985, she experienced one of the most memorable moments of her career, playing the submissive Mina in Roque Santeiro, a maid who suffered at the hands of her boss, Viúva Porcina, played by Regina Duarte, who yelled the catchphrase “Minaaaa!” every time she called the maid.

== Biography ==
The actress was born in Pernambuco, in the city of Floresta, on November 15, 1933. She is a film and theater actress, but mainly a television actress. Ilva moved to Rio de Janeiro shortly after the military dictatorship of 1964. She was brought to television in the 1970s by author Dias Gomes. The actress is the widow of theater director Luiz Mendonça and is the mother of the late actor Luiz Carlos Niño.

Always playing supporting roles, Ilva Niño has had a long career in television, appearing in more than 30 soap operas and several series, all of which were broadcast by TV Globo. Among her many soap operas, she is still remembered today for her role as the maid Mina in Roque Santeiro, when the entertaining Viúva Porcina (Regina Duarte) immortalized the catchphrase “Miiiiiiiiiiinaaaaaa” whenever she needed the maid. Ilva is well known for almost always playing a maid in soap operas.

Her television debut came in 1971, acting in Bandeira 2, a soap opera by Dias Gomes in the 10 p.m. slot, playing Santa, one of the members of the family of migrants from the northeast of Brazil led by Severino (played by actor Sebastião Vasconcelos). She returned to the small screen three years later in Corrida do Ouro, where she played Jandira.

From then on, Ilva landed several roles in soap operas. In 1975, she played Filomena, the maid in Gabriela, and Alzira, the mother of the protagonist in Pecado Capital.

In 1977, she played one of the main maids in Sem Lenço, sem Documento, in which she played Cotinha, the eldest sister of the four maids, a very funny woman who was in love with the voice of a radio announcer. She then appeared in several productions on Rede Globo, such as Água Viva, Jogo da Vida, Lampião e Maria Bonita, and Quem Ama Não Mata.

In 1984, she stood out in the prime-time soap opera Partido Alto, playing the gossipy Iara, the terror of the neighborhood, foul-mouthed and talkative, always present in the events of the soap opera. In 1985, she played the unforgettable Mina in Roque Santeiro.

She accumulated several other roles at TV Globo, such as: the welcoming Belmira in O Outro, the long-suffering Mainha in Bebê a Bordo, the cook Anésia in O Sexo dos Anjos, the maid Naninha in Pedra Sobre Pedra, and another maid, Neide, in Tropicaliente. In 1995, she joined the cast of Manoel Carlos' História de Amor, where she played the cook Chica, who worked for Rômulo Sampaio (Cláudio Corrêa e Castro) and Zuleika Sampaio (Eva Wilma). In 1996, she made a special appearance in O Rei do Gado as Joana. In 1997, she appeared in Por Amor as the housekeeper Dalva.

In 1999, she appeared in two primetime soap operas, one after the other: Suave Veneno as Valdomiro's (José Wilker) maid, Zezé, and Terra Nostra as the nun Teresa. She participated in the first phase of Aguinaldo Silva's soap opera Porto dos Milagres in 2001. She made a special appearance in the 2002 season of Malhação.

After special appearances in Senhora do Destino, Alma Gêmea, and Pé na Jaca, she joined the cast of Walcyr Carrasco's soap opera Sete Pecados, playing the maid Marli.

In 2009, she played Ernestina, a sweet maid in Cama de Gato. In 2011, she returned to soap operas playing the cangaceira Cândida in Cordel Encantado. In 2012, she played Epifânia in Cheias de Charme, in which she was the mother of the comical Socorro (Titina Medeiros) and was contacted by singer Chayene (Cláudia Abreu) to work as her personal midwife, until she discovered that her pregnancy was a hoax. In 2013, she was in the cast of Saramandaia, as the housekeeper Cleide.

In 2016, after three years away from TV recovering from intestinal cancer, she returned to acting in Malhação: Pro Dia Nascer Feliz, playing Damiana, the grandmother of the protagonist Joana.

Her last appearance in soap operas was a special guest role in Aguinaldo Silva's O Outro Lado do Paraíso in 2018.

== Personal life ==
She was the widow of playwright and theater director Luiz Mendonça, to whom she was married from 1957 to 1995. Together they had one son, actor Luiz Carlos Niño, who died in 2005 at the age of 40.

Ilva was also the director and teacher at the “Niño de Artes Luiz Mendonça” theater school, which she founded in 2003 in honor of her husband, and a theater teacher at Escola Politécnica de Saúde Joaquim Venâncio-Oswaldo Cruz Foundation, both in Rio de Janeiro.

=== Death ===
In early 2014, Ilva took a break from her artistic work to treat intestinal cancer, from which she recovered in 2016.

She died on June 12, 2024, at the age of 90. The actress had been hospitalized since May 13 at Quali Hospital in Ipanema neighborhood, after undergoing heart surgery to treat respiratory, digestive, and kidney complications, which culminated in multiple organ failure.

== Filmography ==
=== Television ===
Year	Title	Role	Notes
1971	Bandeira 2	Santa de Jesus Barbosa (Santinha)	
1973	Caso Especial	Senhora	Episode: "O Duelo"
1974	Corrida do Ouro	Jandira	
1975	Gabriela	Dona Filomena	Episode: "14 de abril"
1975	Pecado Capital	Alzira Batista	
1977	Sem Lenço, sem Documento	Maricota Galvão (Cotinha)	
1978	Caso Especial	PiYear's wife	Episode: "A Enxada"
1979	Feijão Maravilha	Filomena	
1980	Água Viva	Antônia	
1982	Jogo da Vida	Mariúcha's mother	Episode: "8 de maio"
1982	Quem Ama Não Mata	Helena	
1982	Lampião e Maria Bonita	Odete Conceição de Oliveira	
1983	Guerra dos Sexos	Woman in the jungle	Episode: "6 de junho"
1983	Caso Verdade	Amélia	Episode: "Chico Xavier, Um Infinito Amor"
1984	Partido Alto	Iara de Jesus	
1985	Roque Santeiro	Filismina (Mina)	
1987	O Outro	Belmira Pescolato Silveira	
1988	Bebê a Bordo	Maria Bezerra (Mainha)	
1989	O Sexo dos Anjos	Anésia	
1992	Você Decide	Genoveva	Episode: "Cigarra ou Formiga"
1992	Pedra sobre Pedra	Naninha	
1993	Contos de Verão	Neusa	
1993	Você Decide	Elza	Episode: "Faça a Coisa Certa"
1994	Confissões de Adolescente	Dona Sebastiana	Episode: "Ainda Não!"
1994	Tropicaliente	Neide	
1995	História de Amor	Chica	
1996	O Rei do Gado	Joana	
1997	Caça Talentos	Madame Esmeralda	Episode: "Na Palma da Mão"
1997	Por Amor	Dalva	
1998	Você Decide	Maria	Episode: "A Volta por Cima"
1999	Suave Veneno	Maria José (Zezé)	
1999	Terra Nostra	Irmã Letícia	Episodes: "21–26 de outubro"
2000	Malhação	Yolanda	
2001	Porto dos Milagres	Valderice	
2002	Malhação	Sister Teresa de Almeida	
2004	Sítio do Picapau Amarelo	Tonha Timbó	Episode: "A Estrada"
2004	Senhora do Destino	Severina Pimentel (Dona Bil)	Episode: "28 de junho"
2005	Alma Gêmea	Almerinda	Episodes: "25–27 de junho"
2006	Um Menino muito Maluquinho	Irene	
2006	Pé na Jaca	Santa Mangabeira de Arrabal	
2007	Sete Pecados	Marli Pereira	
2008	Duas Caras	Risoleta	Episodes: "26–28 de março"
2008	Faça Sua História	Dalva	Episode: "Álbum de Família"
2008	Guerra e Paz	Naná	Episode: "O Belo e as Feras"
2009	Toma Lá, Dá Cá	Dona Damiana	Episode: "O Anel que Tu me Deste"
2009	Cama de Gato	Ernestina Tibiriçá	
2011	Cordel Encantado	Cândida Araújo	
2012	Cheias de Charme	Maria Epifânia Cordeiro de Jesus	
2013	Saramandaia	Cleide Neves Tavares	
2016	Mister Brau	Dona Zoraide	Episode: "24 de maio"
2016	Malhação: Pro Dia Nascer Feliz	Damiana Miranda	
2017	Planeta B	Dona Fofinha	Episode: "A Franga Passou!"
2018	O Outro Lado do Paraíso	Sebastiana Almeida (Tiana)	Episodes: "19–20 de fevereiro"
2019–21	Os Roni	Dona Santinha	
2020	Rua do Sobe e Desce, Número que Desaparece	Janice	Episode: "4 de agosto"

=== Cinema ===
Year	Title	Role	Notes
1971	André, a Cara e a Coragem	Carolina	
1971	Como Ganhar na Loteria sem Perder a Esportiva	Zefa	
1972	Cassy Jones, o Magnífico Sedutor	Prostitute	
1973	Aladim e a Lâmpada Maravilhosa	Customer complaining about the elixir	
1975	Com Um Grilo na Mão	Rosa	
1975	Uma Mulata Para Todos		
1976	Crueldade Mortal	Josefina	
1980	O Escolhido de Iemanjá	Mother of the accident victim	
1981	Amor e Traição		Only vocals
1982	Piranha de Véu e Grinalda	Raimunda	
1982	Insônia		Segment: "Dois Dedos"
1986	Com Licença, Eu Vou à Luta	Otávio's mother	
1986	Ópera do Malandro	Dóris Pelanca	
1986	Vento Sul		
1987	Leila Diniz	Babysitter	
1987	Fronteira das Almas	Victim of land grabbers	
1990	Stelinha	Beggar	
2011	Federal Bank Heist	Marisa Mello	
2016	Minha Mãe é Uma Peça 2	Zezé	
2019	Lamento	Otilia	

== Theater ==
Year	Title	Role of Ilva Niño	Author	Premiere Date	Notes
1956	O Auto da Compadecida	Actress	Ariano Suassuna	September 11, 1956	Her breakthrough role; won Best Actress at the National Amateur Festival in 1957
1961	A Derradeira Ceia	Actress			Early theater work in Pernambuco/Rio transition period
1962	Julgamento em Novo Sol	Actress		May 5, 1962	
1962	A Incelença	Actress		December 29, 1962	Later remounted/directed by others (e.g., Camilla Amado in 2013)
1963	Estórias do Mato: A Afilhada de Nossa Senhora da Conceição	Actress		September 15, 1963	Part of a cycle of regional stories
1963	Estórias do Mato: A Incelença	Actress		September 15, 1963	Likely a companion piece or remount in the same series
1966	Se Correr o Bicho Pega, Se Ficar o Bicho Come	Actress	Dias Gomes & Ferreira Gullar	April 9, 1966	Classic Brazilian political satire
1968	Paixão de Cristo	Actress			Religious-themed passion play
1971	Casa Grande e Senzala	Actress			Adaptation inspired by Gilberto Freyre's work; listed twice in source but counted once
1976	O Último Carro	Actress	João das Neves	March 30, 1976	Produced by Grupo Opinião (Rio de Janeiro); award-winning play delayed by censorship
1978	A Ópera do Malandro	Actress	Chico Buarque	July 26, 1978	Iconic Brazilian musical theater adaptation
1980	O Último dos Nukupyrus	Actress			Environmental/indigenous-themed play

== Prizes ==
Year	Awards	Category	Nominee	Result	Ref.
1957	1º Festival de Amadores Nacionais	Best Actress	O Auto da Compadecida	Win	
2018	Festival de Cinema de Triunfo	Contribution to Art	Tribute	Win	
