= Partido Alto (TV series) =

Brazilian telenovela

- Genre: Telenovela
- Created by: Aguinaldo Silva; Glória Perez
- Directed by: Roberto Talma; Jorge Fernando; Guel Arraes
- Starring: Betty Faria; Raul Cortez; Elizabeth Savalla; Cláudio Marzo; Glória Pires; Lílian Lemmertz; Elizângela; Kadu Moliterno; Herson Capri; Milton Gonçalves; Norma Bengell; Célia Helena; Ilva Niño; Jonas Mello
- Opening theme: "Enredo do meu samba" by Sandra de Sá
- Country of origin: Brazil
- Original language: Portuguese
- No. of episodes: 173

Production
- Running time: 50 minutes

Original release
- Network: TV Globo
- Release: 7 May – 23 November 1984

Related
- Champagne; Corpo a Corpo

Partido Alto is a Brazilian telenovela produced and broadcast by TV Globo. It premiered on 7 May 1984 and ended on 23 November 1984, with a total of 173 episodes. It's the thirty-second "novela das oito" to be aired on the timeslot. It is created and written by Aguinaldo Silva with Glória Perez and directed by Roberto Talma, Jorge Fernando and Guel Arraes.

== Cast ==
Actor	Role
Cláudio Marzo	Maurício Vilela
Betty Faria	Jussara Sampaio
Glória Pires	Celina Cruz
Elizabeth Savalla	Isadora Amoedo
Susana Vieira	Gilda (Gildete)
Norma Bengell	Irene
Raul Cortez	Célio Cruz
Kadu Moliterno	Werner
Christiane Torloni	Selma
Débora Duarte	Laura
José Mayer	Piscina
Herson Capri	Sérgio
Ilva Niño	Iara
Marilu Bueno	Sulamita
Elizângela	Cidinha (Maria Aparecida)
Cininha de Paula	Salete
Roberto Bonfim	Genilson
Carla Daniel	Malu
Cristina Galvão	Sandra
Edney Giovenazzi	Alceu
Guilherme Karan	Políbio
Mário César Camargo	Kléber
Germano Filho	Jesus
Lucy Mafra	Andreia
Nélia Paula	Dona Manuela
Neuza Caribé	Zezinha
Antônio Pitanga	Jacaré
Eliane Maia	Creusa
Arnaud Rodrigues	Mr. Soul
Bia Sion	Su
Jorge Coutinho	Jovino
André de Biase	Marcos
Jonas Mello	Zé Luiz
Percy Aires	Agostinho
Cosme dos Santos	Zé Pretinho
Luís Felipe de Lima	Felipe
Monique Alves	Ana Benta
Nardel Ramos	Raposo
Gilson Moura	Amaral
Hélio Procópio Mariano	Hélio
Angela Rebello	Deia
Carmem Figueira	Telma
Rubens Corrêa	Arnaldo Amoedo
Célia Helena	Izilda Cruz (Izildinha)
Lilian Lemmertz	Nanci
Milton Gonçalves	Reginaldo
Fábio Sabag	Turquinho do Meier
Ney Latorraca	Escadinha
Paulo César Pereio	Roberto da Matta
Lima Duarte	Cocada
Armando Bógus	Artur
Eva Todor	Cecília Amoedo
Roberto Bataglin	Fernando
Rafael Alvarez	Jorginho (Jorge Sampaio)
Marcelo Peniche	André
