= Milton Gonçalves =

Brazilian actor (1933–2022)

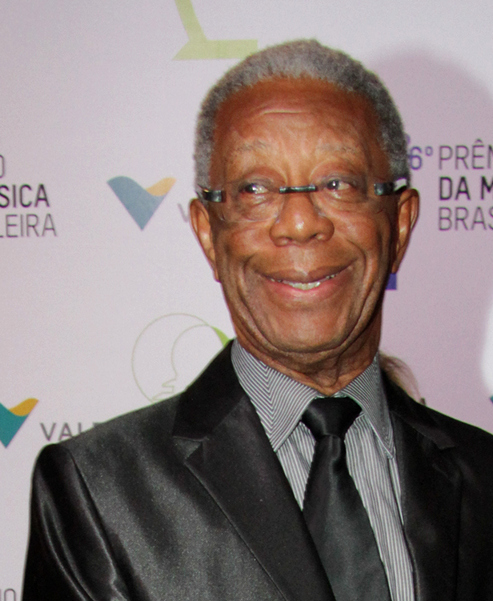
- Gonçalves in 2015
- Born: 9 December 1933; Monte Santo de Minas, Minas Gerais, Brazil
- Died: 30 May 2022 (aged 88); Rio de Janeiro, Brazil
- Occupations: Actor, director
- Years active: 1957–2021
- Spouse: Oda Gonçalves (m. 1966; died 2013)
- Children: 3

Milton Gonçalves (Brazilian Portuguese: [ˈmiwtõ ɡõˈsawvis]; 9 December 1933 – 30 May 2022) was a Brazilian actor and television director, who was one of the most famous black actors in Brazil, having collaborated twice with acclaimed director Héctor Babenco. One notable role with Babenco was that alongside William Hurt and Raul Julia as a police chief in Kiss of the Spider Woman.

He worked in many telenovelas, including A Cabana do Pai Tomás, Irmãos Coragem, O Bem-Amado, Pecado Capital, Baila Comigo, Partido Alto, Mandala, Felicidade, A Favorita, and Lado a Lado. He also worked as director in O Bem-Amado and Escrava Isaura.

== Career ==
Gonçalves began his career in São Paulo, in an amateur group. As he moved to a professional group, he met Augusto Boal, who was looking for an actor to play an old black man. Joining Boal's Teatro de Arena, Milton Gonçalves found an open environment for political, philosophical, and artistic discussion, where he was not discriminated against on the baseless basis of his race.

Gonçalves wrote four plays, one of which was staged by the Teatro Experimental do Negro and directed by Dalmo Ferreira. He said of this engagement "There I learnt everything I know about Theater. It was fundamental for my comprehension of the world."

A Black Movement activist, Milton Gonçalves tried a political career, in the 1990s, as a candidate to Rio de Janeiro state governorship.

Father of actor Maurício Gonçalves, he was married to Oda Gonçalves from 1966 until her death in 2013.

The life and career of Milton Gonçalves are depicted in the 2025 documentary film Milton Gonçalves, Além do Espetáculo, by Luiz Antonio Pilar.

== Death ==
Gonçalves died in Rio de Janeiro on 30 May 2022, at the age of 88, from complications of a stroke he had suffered two years earlier.

== Filmography ==
=== Television ===
Year	Title	Role	Notes
1961	O Vigilante Rodoviário	Inspector Carlos	Episode: "Aventuras do Tuca"
1965	Rua da Matriz	—N/a	
1965	Rosinha do Sobrado	Agenor	
1965	A Moreninha	Simão	
1965	Padre Tião	Negrão	
1968	Balança Mas Não Cai	—N/a	Director
1969	A Cabana do Pai Tomás	Hasan "Onça"	
1970	Irmãos Coragem	Braz Canoeiro	Also director
1971	Bandeira 2	Caldas	
1972	Vila Sésamo	Teacher Leão	
1973	O Bem-Amado	Zelão das Asas	
1974	O Espigão	Nonô Alegria das Gringas	
1975	Gabriela	Filó	
1975	Roque Santeiro	Priest Honório	Censored version
1975	Pecado Capital	Doctor Percival Garcia	
1976	Escrava Isaura	—N/a	Director
1977	Sem Lenço, sem Documento	Tibúrcio	
1978	O Pulo do Gato	Caxuxo	
1978	Sinal de Alerta	Rafa	
1980	Chega Mais	Priest	Episode: "March 3"
1981	Baila Comigo	Otto Rodrigues	
1981	Terras do Sem-Fim	Damião	
1983	Pão Pão, Beijo Beijo	Doctor Mendes	
1983	Caso Verdade	—N/a	Episode: "Memórias de um Menino de Negócios"
1984	Partido Alto	Reginaldo	
1984	Eu Prometo	Director of the OBS unit	
1985	Roque Santeiro	Promoter Lourival Prata	
1985	Tenda dos Milagres	Master Lídio Corró	
1986	Cambalacho	Tião	
1986	Sinhá Moça	Pai José	Episode: "April 28"
1987	Mandala	Apolinário Santana	
1988	Fera Radical	Damasceno Righi Salomão	
1989	Que Rei Sou Eu?	Barão Herr Whisky	
1990	Gente Fina	Nei Assunção "Michael Jackson"	
1990	Delegacia de Mulheres	Francisco	Episode: "Em Defesa da Honra"
1990	Araponga	Zé das Couves	
1991	Felicidade	Batista	
1992	As Noivas de Copacabana	Doctor Fernando	
1992	Você Decide	Delegate Nelson	Episode: "O Álibi"
1992	De Corpo e Alma	Judge	
1993	Agosto	Eusébio	
1993	Você Decide	Delegate Sílvio	Episode: "Isca de Polícia"
1993	Você Decide	Seu Tito	Episode: "O Porteiro"
1993	Olho no Olho	Priest	Episode: "September 6th"
1994	A Madona de Cedro	Sinval	
1994	Você Decide	Delegate Nilo	Episode: "Amigo do Peito"
1995	Irmãos Coragem	—N/a	
1995	História de Amor	Priest	
1995	Decadência	Jovildo Siqueira	
1996	O Fim do Mundo	Juiz	
1996	O Rei do Gado	—N/a	
1996	Anjo de Mim	Master Quirino / Sebastião	
1998	Dona Flor e Seus Dois Maridos	Clemente	
1998	Meu Bem Querer	Eder	
1999	Chiquinha Gonzaga	Henrique Alves de Mesquita	
1999	Andando nas Nuvens	Delegate Serafim	
1999	Malhação	Leal Calabar	
2000	Megatom	Lawyer	Episode: "April 9"
2001	A Grande Família	Otávio	Episode: "A Melhor Casa da Rua"
2001	Brava Gente	Delegate Motta	Episode: "Proezas do Finado Zacarias"
2002	Esperança	Matias dos Santos	
2004	Zorra Total	Campelo	
2004	Começar de Novo	Lázaro	
2004	Malhação	Judge	Special participation
2005	Carandiru, Outras Histórias	Chico	Episode: "Ao Mestre com Carinho"
2005	América	Probation officer	Episode: "March 14"
2006	Sinhá Moça	Father José das Dores	Episode: "March 13th"
2006	Cobras & Lagartos	Jair dos Santos	
2008	A Favorita	Deputy Romildo Rosa	
2009	Força-Tarefa	Colonel Caetano	
2009	Chico e Amigos	Haroldo	End of year special
2011	Insensato Coração	Gregório Gurgel	Episodes: "March 26–June 22"
2012	Lado a Lado	Afonso Nascimento	
2014	O Caçador	Bank old man	Episode: "April 11"
2014	Lili, a Ex	Ancelmo de Monteiro Costa	Season 1
2015	Além do Tempo	—N/a	Narrator (initial calls)
2017	Pega Pega	Cristóvão Souza Damião	
2017	Os Trapalhões	Narrator of Aparício	Episode: "July 27th"
2017–2019	Carcereiros	Doctor Louveira	
2018	O Tempo Não Para	Eliseu Emerenciano	
2018	Se Eu Fechar os Olhos Agora	Adult Paulo Roberto Antunes	Also narrator
2019	Malhação: Toda Forma de Amar	Judge Douglas	Episodes: "September 18–December 17"
2019	Juntos a Magia Acontece	Orlando Santos	End of year special
2021	Filhas de Eva	Gasparian	Episode: "4"

=== Film ===
Year	Title	Role
2021	Pixinguinha, Um Homem Carinhoso	Alfredo Vianna
2019	Carcereiros - O Filme	Doctor Gouveia
2017	Pelé: Birth of a Legend	Waldemar de Brito
2015	Meus Dois Amores	Monsenhor Fidélis
2015	The Duel: A Story Where Truth Is Mere Detail	Governor
2014	The Adventures of the Red Airplane	Red Airplane (voice)
2013	Giovanni Improtta	Ozires
2012	Billi Pig	Priest Roberval
2011	Federal Bank Heist	Pastor
2010	Quincas Berro D'Água	Delegate Morais
2010	Segurança Nacional	President of the Republic Dantas
2008	A Ilha dos Escravos	Tesoura
2007	Xuxa em Sonho de Menina	School director
2006	Fica Comigo Esta Noite	Priest
2006	Cobrador: In God We Trust	Zinho
2006	Yansan	Narrator
2005	Xuxinha e Guto Contra os Monstros do Espaço	Euclides Arquimedes (voice)
2005	As Filhas do Vento	Seu Zé
2004	Xuxa e o Tesouro da Cidade Perdida	Hélio Hipólito
2003	Acquária	Závos
2003	Carandiru	Chico
2003	As Alegres Cumadres	Priest Arnaldo
2001	Bufo & Spallanzani	Delegate Ferreira
2001	Villa-Lobos - Uma Vida de Paixão	Saxophonist
1999	Orfeu	Inácio
1999	O Dia da Caça	Miranda
1997	O Testamento do Senhor Napumoceno	Mayor
1997	Four Days in September	Embassy Security
1997	O Homem Nu	—N/a
1994	A Morte da Mulher do Atirador de Facas	—N/a
1992	Kickboxer 3	Sergeant
1990	O Quinto Macaco	Juiz
1989	Wild Orchid	Flávio
1988	Luar sobre Parador	Carlo
1988	Natal da Portela	Natal da Portela
1987	Um Trem para as Estrelas	Freitas
1986	O Rei do Rio	Cacareco
1985	Pedro Mico	Pedro Mico (Dubbing Pelé)
1985	Kiss of the Spider Woman	Police chief
1984	Aguenta Coração	—N/a
1984	Quilombo	—N/a
1981	They Don't Wear Black Tie	Bráulio
1980	Parceiros da Aventura	Bené
1979	O Sol dos Amantes	Sebastião Raimundo
1979	Na Boca do Mundo	—N/a
1977	Lucio Flavio	132
1977	Ladrões de Cinema	Luquinha
1976	A Fera Carioca	Macumbeiro
1975	Ipanema, Adeus	Burglar
1974	A Rainha Diaba	Diaba
1973	Robin Hood	Sheriff of Nottingham (voice)
1971	As Quatro Chaves Mágicas	Burglar
1970	Pedro Diabo Ama Rosa Meia-Noite	Inmate
1969	O Anjo Nasceu	Urtiga
1969	Sete Homens Vivos ou Mortos	Mico Sujo
1969	Macunaíma	Jiguê
1969	Máscara da Traição	Severino
1969	A Cama ao Alcance de Todos	—N/a
1969	Os Raptores	Eusébio
1969	O Bravo Guerreiro	Unionist
1968	O Homem que Comprou o Mundo	Soldier
1968	Na Mira do Assassino	Nhonhoca
1968	O Homem Nu	Change man
1967	Mineirinho Vivo ou Morto	Caveira
1966	Toda Donzela Tem um Pai que É uma Fera	Concierge
1965	Paraíba, Vida e Morte de um Bandido	Bira
1965	Grande Sertão	Tonico
1964	Procura-se uma Rosa	—N/a
1963	Gimba	Mãozinha
1962	Cinco Vezes Favela	(segment: "Couro de Gato")
1960	Cidade Ameaçada	—N/a
1958	O Grande Momento	Amusement park boy

== Stage ==
He participated in more than thirty plays, among which we can highlight:

Year	Title
1957	"Ratos e Homens" by John Steinbeck,
1957	"Eles Não Usam Black-Tie" by Gianfrancesco Guarnieri,
1959	"Chapetuba Futebol Clube" by Oduvaldo Viana Filho,
1959	"Gente Como a Gente" by Roberto Freire,
1960	"Revolução Na América do Sul" by Augusto Boal,
1961	"Pintado de Alegre" by Flávio Migliaccio,
1961	"O Testamento do Cangaceiro" by Chico de Assis,
1962	"Os Fuzis da Sr.ª Carrar" by Bertoldt Brecht,
1962	"A Mandrágora" by Maquiavel,
1963	"Arena Conta Zumbi" by Gianfrancesco Guarnieri, Augusto Boal and Edu Lobo,
1963	"As Aventuras de Ripió Lacraia" by Chico de Assis,
1966	"Barrela" de Plínio Marcos, (censored)
1966	"América Injusta',
1966	"Memórias de Um Sargento de Milícias" by Manuel Antônio de Almeida,
1966	"A Pena E A Lei" by Ariano Suassuna,
1969	"Alice No País Divino Maravilhoso" by Paulo Afonso Grisolli,
1969	"Jornada de Um Imbecil Até o Entendimento" by Plínio Marcos,
1970	"No fundo do Poço Sem Fundo" by Lafayette Galvão,
1975	"A farsa da Boa Preguiça" by Ariano Suassuna,
1980	"Os Órfãos de Jânio" by Millôr Fernandes,
1984	"Vargas" by Dias Gomes,
1985	"Apesar de Tudo" by Fernando Berto,
1989	'Orfeu da Conceição" by Vinícius de Moraes,
1990-1991	"Master Harold...E Os Meninos" by Athol Fugard,
1995-1996	"Lima Barreto Ao Terceiro Dia" by Luíz Alberto de Abreu,

== Awards and nominations ==
Year	Award	Category	Work nominated	Result
1974	Festival de Cinema de Brasília	Best Actor	A Rainha Diaba	Won
1974	Prêmio Air France de Cinema	Best Actor	A Rainha Diaba	Won
1974	Prêmio Coruja de Ouro	Best Actor	A Rainha Diaba	Won
1974	Prêmio Governador do Estado	Best Actor	A Rainha Diaba	Won
1978	Festival de Cinema de Gramado	Best Supporting Actor	Barra Pesada	Won
1981	Prêmio Estácio de Sá	Homage	Theater Career	Won
1990	Festival de Cinema e TV de Natal	Best Actor	Natal da Portela	Won
2001	Prêmio Shell	Best Actor	Conduzindo Miss Daisy	Won
2003	Festival de Cinema de Gramado	Trophy Oscarito	Homage	Won
2004	Festival de Cinema de Gramado	Best Actor	As Filhas do Vento	Won
2004	Festival Internacional de Cinema de Cartagena	Best Supporting Actor	Carandiru	Won
2006	Prêmio TECO de Teatro	Homage	Set of Work	Won
2008	Troféu Raça Negra	Homage	Set of Work	Won
2009	Festival de Teatro do Rio	Homage	Set of Work	Won
2010	Prêmio Camélia da Liberdade	Homage	Set of Work	Won
2012	Prêmio Contigo! de Cinema Nacional	Best Supporting Actor	Billi Pig	Nominated
2013	Troféu Top of Business	Featured on TV	Lado a Lado	Won
2014	Prêmio Cesgranrio de Teatro	Homage	Set of Work	Won
2015	Festival de Cinema CineOP	Homage	Set of Work	Won
2018	Troféu Mário Lago	Contribution to Art	Set of Work	Won
