= Roque Santeiro =

Brazilian soap opera

- Genre: Romance; Drama; Thriller
- Created by: Dias Gomes; Aguinaldo Silva
- Directed by: Paulo Ubiratan
- Starring: Regina Duarte; Lima Duarte; Yoná Magalhães; Fábio Júnior; José Wilker
- Opening theme: "Santa Fé" by Moraes Moreira
- Ending theme: "Santa Fé" by Moraes Moreira
- Composer: Moraes Moreira
- Country of origin: Brazil
- Original language: Portuguese
- No. of episodes: 209

Production
- Production location: Brazil
- Running time: 75 minutes

Original release
- Network: TV Globo
- Release: 24 June 1985 – 21 February 1986

Related
- Corpo a Corpo; Selva de Pedra

Roque Santeiro is a Brazilian primetime telenovela produced and broadcast by TV Globo. It premiered on 24 June 1985 (replacing Corpo a Corpo) and ended on 21 February 1986, (replaced by Selva de Pedra).

The script was created by Dias Gomes —based on a play O Berço do Herói (Hero's Cradle)— and starred Regina Duarte, Lima Duarte, José Wilker, Lucinha Lins, Yoná Magalhães, Paulo Gracindo, Armando Bógus, Cássia Kis Magro, Elizângela, Fábio Júnior, Lídia Brondi, Cláudio Cavalcanti, Cláudia Raia, Lutero Luiz, Maurício Mattar, Eloísa Mafalda and Ary Fontoura. It was directed by Paul Ubiratan and co-written by Aguinaldo Silva.

Roque Santeiro became a great success, with high viewership levels, and is recognized today as one of the best telenovelas of all time. It was distributed to several different countries around the world, and had an audience of 60 million viewers (out of approxmimentally 135-138 million Brazilians at the time), and is currently the most-watched show in the history of Brazilian television.

== Plot ==
In the tiny poor town of Asa Branca, in the middle of Brazilian Northeast, Roque Santeiro is worshiped as a saint. He was supposedly killed by a bandit, 17 years ago, trying to save the local church. After his disappearance, local leaderships such as landowner Sinhozinho Malta and mayor Florindo, took profit on that to control the humble population. They even make up a widow, Porcina, who should have married Roque secretly before his death. What they don't expect is that Roque is alive, and he's back to, allegedly, "save his people". Now Malta, Florindo, Porcina, and others must hold him down and explain the "truth" to their commoners, in a desperate attempt to save their own bottoms. Meanwhile, mysterious facts surround Asa Branca, such as a Werewolf, a film crew who are trying to shoot a movie about Roque's story, and violent murderers.

== Cast ==
Actor/Actress	Character
Regina Duarte	Viúva Porcina (Porcina da Silva)
Lima Duarte	Sinhozinho Malta (Francisco Teixeira Malta)
José Wilker	Roque Santeiro (Luís Roque Duarte)
Ary Fontoura	Prefeito Florindo Abelha
Eloísa Mafalda	Dona Pombinha (Ambrosina Abelha)
Yoná Magalhães	Matilde
Armando Bógus	Zé das Medalhas (José Ribamar de Aragão)
Lídia Brondi	Tânia Magalhães Malta
Fábio Júnior	Roberto Mathias
Paulo Gracindo	Padre Hipólito
Cláudio Cavalcanti	Padre Albano, o "Padre Vermelho"
Lucinha Lins	Mocinha Abelha
Cássia Kis Magro	Lulu (Lugolina de Aragão)
Rui Resende	Professor Astromar Junqueira
Patrícia Pillar	Linda Bastos
Ewerton de Castro	Gérson do Valle
Luiz Armando Queiroz	Tito Moreira França
Elizângela	Marilda
Oswaldo Loureiro	Navalhada (Aparício Limeira)
Nélia Paula	Amparito Hernandez
Othon Bastos	Ronaldo César
Arnaud Rodrigues	Cego Jeremias
Walter Breda	Francisco
Wanda Kosmo	Dona Marcelina Magalhães
João Carlos Barroso	Toninho Jiló
Nelson Dantas	Beato Salu
Maurício do Valle	Delegado Feijó
Ísis de Oliveira	Rosaly
Cláudia Raia	Ninon (Maria do Carmo)
Maurício Mattar	João Ligeiro (João Duarte)
Cláudia Costa	Carla
Alexandre Frota	Luizão (Luiz Cláudio)
Ilva Niño	Mina (Filismina)
Tony Tornado	Rodésio
Waldyr Sant'anna	Terêncio Apolinário
Cristina Galvão	Dondinha
Lutero Luiz	Doutor Cazuza
Angela Leal	Odete
Regina Dourado	Efigênia
Lícia Magna	Ciana
Ângela Figueiredo	Selma Sotero
Leina Krespi	Maria Igarapé
Lilian Lemmertz	Margarida Malta
Dedina Bernardelli	Ângela Flores
Vera Manhães	Noêmia (wife of the prosecutor)
Luiz Magnelli	Decembrino
Edyr de Castro	Nininha
Arthur Costa Filho	Dr. Cipó
Fernando José	Oliveira
Hemílcio Fróes	Colméia
Gilson Moura	Tião
Gabriela Senra	Lulu (child)
José de Freitas	Deputado Ferreira de Jesus
Heloísa Helena	Madre Felícia
Izabella Bicalho	Porcina da Silva (young)
Lu Mendonça	Rosa
Tonico e Tinoco	themselves
Jorge Coutinho	Seu Devagar
Dhu Moraes	Dona Maricota
Vera Lúcia	Tia Sinhá Maria
Dennis Carvalho	Marcos Tomazzini

== Impact ==
=== Ratings ===
Timeslot	# Ep.	Premiere		Finale		Rank	Season	Rating average
Timeslot	# Ep.	Date	Premiere Rating	Date	Finale Rating	Rank	Season	Rating average
Monday—Saturday; 8:25pm	209	24 June 1985	68	21 February 1986	96	#1	1985-86	74

In its premiere, Roque Santeiro acquired 68.0 Ibope Rating, considering the measurement for Greater São Paulo, eighteen points above the target set by Rede Globo that year. In the same week, on a Saturday, it was registered the lowest audience of the telenovela: 58 points. The average of the first week was 65 points.

On 20 August 1985, in Episode 50, Roque Santeiro posted a record audience: 81 points. It was the first time the telenovela recorded an index above 80 points. In that week, the average was 71 points.

On 17 February 1986, in Episode 205, Roque registered a record audience: 91 points. It was the first time the telenovela recorded an index above 90 points, a fact that would be repeated only in the last chapter: 96 points.

In the last episode, it was registered a historical index on Brazilian television: 100 points. In the scene where Sinhozinho Malta and Viúva Porcina say goodbye to Roque Santeiro, and leave Asa Branca, 100% of the Brazilian television sets were tuned on Rede Globo.

=== Awards ===
Troféu APCA (1985):

- Best Telenovela
- Best Actress - Regina Duarte
- Best Actor - Lima Duarte
- Female Revelation - Cláudia Raia
- Best Telenovela Text - Dias Gomes and Aguinaldo Silva

Troféu Imprensa (1985):

- Best Telenovela
- Best Actress - Regina Duarte
- Best Actor - Lima Duarte
- Revelation of the Year - Cláudia Raia (tie with Tetê Espindola)
