= Pecado Capital =

Brazilian telenovela (1975–1976)

- Genre: Telenovela
- Created by: Janete Clair
- Directed by: Daniel Filho; Jardel Mello
- Starring: Francisco Cuoco; Betty Faria; Lima Duarte; Rosamaria Murtinho; Débora Duarte; Dennis Carvalho; Theresa Amayo; Emiliano Queiroz; Elizângela; Ilva Niño; Luiz Armando Queiroz; Sandra Barsotti
- Opening theme: "Pecado Capital" by Paulinho da Viola
- Country of origin: Brazil
- Original language: Portuguese
- No. of episodes: 167

Production
- Running time: 50 minutes

Original release
- Network: TV Globo
- Release: 24 November 1975 – 4 June 1976

Related
- Escalada; O Casarão

Pecado Capital is a Brazilian telenovela produced and broadcast by TV Globo. It premiered on 24 November 1975 and ended on 4 June 1976, with a total of 167 episodes. It's the sixteenth "novela das oito" to be aired on the timeslot. It is created and written by Janete Clair and directed by Daniel Filho and Jardel Mello.

== Plot ==
=== Main plot ===
Carlão is a cab driver who experiences a drama of conscience after fleeing bank robbers leave a suitcase of stolen money in his car: he doesn't know whether to hand it over to the police, at the risk of being accused of being an accomplice to the robbery, or to use the money to solve his problems. He is Lucinha's fiancé, with whom he has a passionate relationship, but one that is marred by fights and jealousy due to his machismo.

Lucinha is a young dreamer who works as a weaver at Centauro, a clothing factory owned by industrialist Salviano Lisboa. Chosen to star in an advertising campaign, she begins to make a name for herself as a model under the name Luci Jordan. Her movement through more sophisticated environments, combined with Carlão's rudeness, distances her from the reality of the Méier suburb, leading her to get involved with Salviano, a gentle and sensitive man whose manners contrast with those of her ex-fiancé.

The two fall in love and Lucinha is forced to face the distrust and hostility of the businessman's children in order to make her love come true: not only do they disapprove of their father's relationship with a younger woman from a different social class, but they are certain that the girl is only interested in the family's money.

Carlão doesn't realize that it's not money, but cultural distance, represented by conflicting values, that separates him from his love. To prove to his ex-girlfriend that he can compete with Salviano, he buys a fleet of cabs with the money from the robbery and begins his social rise as a suburban businessman, helping residents of his community. He becomes known as the “King of Méier”. Penalized, he marries Eunice, involuntarily involved in the bank robbery and who, with the disappearance of the suitcase containing the money, risks being arrested as an accomplice to the robbery. The ex-taxi driver, however, starts spending a lot of money. In order not to lose his status, and because of his obsession with Lucinha, he gets involved in illicit transactions with Sandoval, a dangerous thug, who threatens him and collects a loan debt.

At the end of the plot, Carlão decides to stay with Eunice. Redeemed, he sells the cab fleet to return the money from the robbery and then turns himself in to the police. Sandoval, however, kidnaps and tortures Elisete, who ends up revealing her brother's plans. Carlão leaves the suitcase with the money at the subway works in Largo da Carioca, in the center of Rio, and tells the police, unaware that he is being followed by Sandoval and his partner. On seeing the bandits, Carlão runs after them and manages to recover the suitcase, but is shot dead. The bandits are arrested. Lucinha and Salviano get married on the same day.

=== Side plot ===
Very young and inexperienced, Emilene is still a teenager who doesn't know what direction to take her life. She even gets involved with Vicente, Salviano's eldest son, who seduces several girls with promises of marriage. But she really falls for Virgílio, who is tempted to abandon his religious vocation for the sake of his feelings for Lucinha's sister. Through this character, Janete Clair discussed religious celibacy. Viewers approved of the couple but, at the end of the soap opera, Virgílio opts for the cassock. Living with Virgílio makes Emilene mature, and she decides to study nursing.

Vilma is one of the main obstacles to Salviano and Lucinha's relationship. Needy, insecure and troubled, she has never accepted her mother's premature death, which is one of the reasons why she is a misfit. Salviano's youngest daughter hangs out with transgressive youths and likes to express herself through the drawings she creates. In her moments of escape from reality, she speaks a strange language - which she attributes to a fictitious country - and talks to animals. The only person who can deal with Vilma is her psychiatrist, Percival, who gradually wins her trust and helps her to understand and overcome her fears.

At a certain point in the novel, Vilma says her name is Telma and goes to work at Nélio Porto Rico's advertising agency, which has the Centauro account. The two fall in love and get married, but continue to live in Salviano's house, as Vilma still can't get over her insecurities. Nélio joins Salviano's family under the suspicion that he got married with an eye on his father-in-law's money, but he truly loves Vilma: he patiently deals with his wife's outbursts, and she doesn't even recognize him as her husband. At times, Vilma consciously uses her illness to attract attention. With the help of Percival and her husband, Vilminha manages to overcome her difficulties: she leaves home and accepts Lucinha into her family. Through the character and Dr. Percival, the author has helped to clarify aspects related to psychological illnesses.

Before that, however, there was a romance between Dr. Percival and Salviano's eldest daughter, Vitória, whose marriage to the domineering Hernani is in crisis. Vitória is not happy in her marriage and longs for greater freedom, as well as not approving of her husband's questionable attitudes, which both flatter and plot against her father-in-law. Percival even moves into the same building as Vitória, and the two become closer, mainly because of Vilma's problems. The relationship between a black man and a white woman would have been a way of addressing racial discrimination in Brazil, but the public reacted badly and the story between the two didn't happen. Vitória asks for a separation after Hernani accepts the position of advisor to Vicente, Salviano's eldest son, who takes his father's place as president of the company.

Vicente is the mastermind behind a plot against his own father. Unhappy with Salviano's relationship with Lucinha, who he thinks is interested in his family's money, Vicente instigates the brothers against the model. Lucinha can't take the pressure and decides to stay away from the businessman. Vicente also manages to remove Salviano from the presidency of Centauro and takes over his position. His immaturity and inexperience, however, lead him to put his foot in it, acting in an authoritarian and thoughtless way. At the end of the plot, he realizes that he has neither the capacity nor the will to manage the company and sets off on a trip with another of his amorous conquests. Bewildered, Valter - who had supported his brother in his plot - and the other directors ask Salviano to take over. But he goes off on his honeymoon with Lucinha and leaves Valdir in the chair.

== Cast ==
- Francisco Cuoco as Carlão (José Carlos Moreno)
- Betty Faria as Lucinha (Maria Lúcia Batista / Lucy Jordan)
- Lima Duarte as Salviano Lisboa
- Rosamaria Murtinho as Eunice Saraiva
- Débora Duarte as Vilminha (Vilma Lisboa)
- Dennis Carvalho as Nélio Porto Rico
- Theresa Amayo as Vitória Lisboa
- Luiz Armando Queiroz as Vicente Lisboa
- Emiliano Queiroz as Valdir
- Gilberto Martinho as Raimundo
- Sandra Barsotti as Gigi
- Elizângela as Emilene Batista
- Germano Filho as Orestes Batista
- Ilva Niño as Alzira Batista
- Lutero Luiz as Marciano
- Milton Gonçalves as Dr. Percival Garcia
- Mário Lago as Dr. Peres
- Marco Nanini as Vinícius Lisboa
- João Carlos Barroso as Valter Lisboa
- Malu Rocha as Cibele Lisboa
- Lauro Góes as Virgílio Lisboa
- Dary Reis as Hernani
- Elza Gomes as Bá
- Maria Pompeu as Djanira
- Miriam Pires as Nora
- Moacyr Deriquém as Ricardo Saraiva
- Regina Duarte as Mila
- Nestor de Montemar as Roger
- Leina Krespi as Elizeth
- Lady Francisco as Rose
- André Valli as Claudius
- Fábio Mássimo as Paulo Roberto (Paulinho)
- Heloísa Helena as Hortência
- Ivan Cândido as Dr. Coutinho
- Fernando José as Dr. Altino
- Alfredo Murphy as Sandoval
- Gilson Moura as Jurandir
- Zanoni Ferrite as Miguel
- Isolda Cresta as Mafalda Lisboa
- Glória Ladany as Aurora
- Juan Daniel as Juan Daniel
- Darcy de Souza as D. Júlia
- José de Arimathéa as Dr. Machado
- Cidinha Milan as Maria de Lourdes
- Hemílcio Fróes as Dr. Noronha
- José Maria Monteiro as Noel
- Daisy Machado as Zilda
- Georgiana de Moraes as Claudinha
- Hélio Fernando as César
- Átila Ventura as Jaime
- Hortênsia Tayer as Vera
- Leda Borba as Judite
- Luís Felipe Vasconcellos as Lucas
