= The Duel: A Story Where Truth Is Mere Detail =

2005 film directed by Marcos Jorge

- Theatrical release poster
- Directed by: Marcos Jorge
- Written by: Jorge Amado
- Produced by: Walkiria Barbosa Marcos Didonet Vilma Lustosa Leonel Vieira
- Cinematography: José Roberto Eliezer
- Music by: Ruriá Duprat
- Production companies: Warner Bros. Pictures; RioFilme; Stopline Films; Total Entertainment
- Distributed by: Warner Bros. Pictures
- Release date: March 19, 2015 (Brazil)
- Running time: 109 minutes
- Country: Brazil
- Language: Portuguese

The Duel: A Story Where Truth Is Mere Detail is a Brazilian movie by Marcos Jorge, released on March 19, 2015 based on the book The Old Sailors or the Captain of the Long Course by the Brazilian writer Jorge Amado.

== Plot ==
Based on Jorge Amado's book The Old Sailors or the Captain of the Long Course, the film tells the story of Commander Vasco Moscoso of Aragon (Joaquim de Almeida) and his hectic arrival at the village of Periperi, located near a large municipality. port. After a long life of adventures on the seas, now mature, this picturesque stranger comes to rest. The captain becomes a storyteller and gains sympathy from most of the locals, but some people are beginning to suspect his character, especially the village's Chico Pacheco and until then the most admired citizen of the place.

== Cast ==
- Joaquim de Almeida as Captain Vasco
- José Wilker as Chico Pacheco
- Tainá Müller as Dorothy
- João Gabriel Vasconcellos as Lieutenant Mário
- Cláudia Raia as Carol
- Patricia Pillar as Clotilde
- Milton Gonçalves as Governor
- Marcio Garcia as Georges
