= Corrida do Ouro =

Brazilian telenovela

- Genre: Telenovela
- Created by: Lauro César Muniz; Gilberto Braga
- Directed by: Daniel Filho; Reynaldo Boury
- Starring: Aracy Balabanian; Sandra Bréa; Célia Biar; Renata Sorrah; Maria Luíza Castelli
- Country of origin: Brazil
- Original language: Portuguese
- No. of episodes: 179

Production
- Running time: 45 minutes

Original release
- Network: TV Globo
- Release: 8 July 1974 – 24 January 1975

Related
- Supermanoela; Cuca Legal

Corrida do Ouro is a Brazilian telenovela produced and broadcast by TV Globo. It premiered on 8 July 1974 and ended on 24 January 1975, with a total of 179 episodes. It's the 14th "novela das sete" to be aired at the timeslot. It is created by Lauro César Muniz and Gilberto Braga, directed by Daniel Filho and Reynaldo Boury.

== Cast ==
Actor	Character
Aracy Balabanian	Tereza Rodrigues
Sandra Bréa	Isadora Ferreira
Renata Sorrah	Patrícia Braga Albuquerque
Célia Biar	Gilda Diniz Steiner
Maria Luíza Castelli	Ilka Silveira da Cunha
Walmor Chagas	Murilo Noronha
José Augusto Branco	Rafael Esteves
Renata Fronzi	Suzana Brito
Zilka Salaberry	Maria Ilka Silveira (Kiki Vassourada)
José Wilker	Fábio Rossi
Yoná Magalhães	Walkíria Braga Albuquerque
Oswaldo Loureiro	Otávio da Cunha
Altair Lima	João Paulo Colaço
Antônio Patiño	André Steiner
Nívea Maria	Vânia Diniz Steiner
Jacyra Silva	Lola
Castro Gonzaga	Onofre Rodrigues
Flávio Migliaccio	Sérgio Esteves
Anilza Leoni	Zélia Esteves
Patrícia Bueno	Mônica Rossi
Fausto Rocha	Mário Brito
Leila Cravo	Carmem
Paulo Gonçalves	Camilo
Heloísa Helena	Florinda
Hemílcio Fróes	Alfredo
Juan Daniel	Jofre
Ilva Niño	Jandira
José Maria Monteiro	Olegário
