= Theresa Amayo =

Brazilian actress (1933–2022)

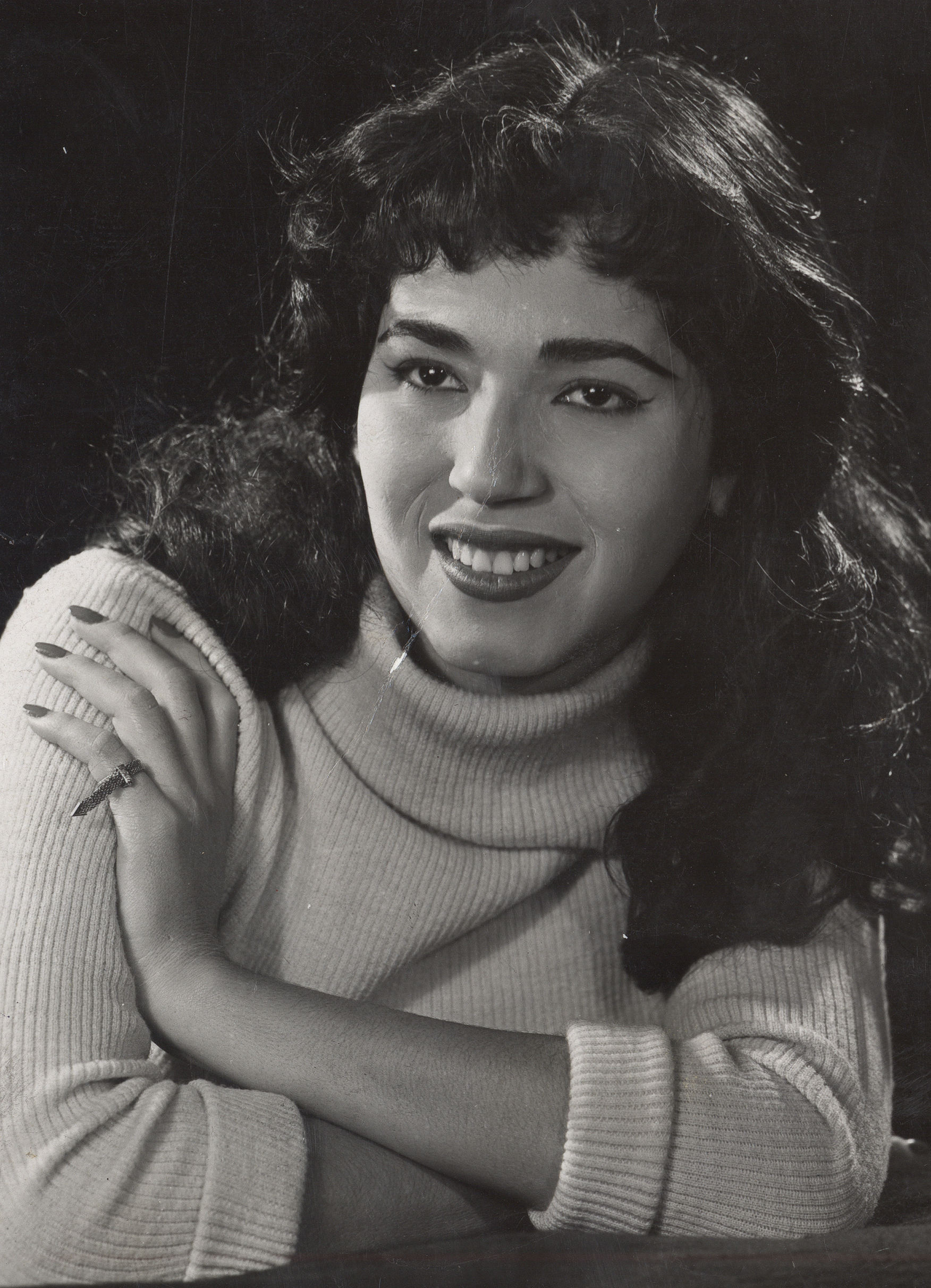
- Amayo in 1957
- Born: Theresa Guichard Amayo; 13 July 1933; Belém, Pará, Brazil
- Died: 24 January 2022 (aged 88); Rio de Janeiro, Brazil
- Occupation: Actress
- Spouse: Mario Brasini (died 1997)

Theresa Guichard Amayo Brasini (13 July 1933 – 24 January 2022) was a Brazilian actress.

== Life and career ==
Amayo began her career on stage in the 1950s. She was an early star of Brazilian television, first working for Rede Tupi, and then being one of the first actresses who got an exclusive contract by Rede Globo. Her major works include Sangue e Areia (1967–1968) and Pecado Capital (1975–1976).

The wife of the actor, screenwriter and film director Mário Brasini, in 2004 Amayo lost her daughter, her son-in-law and her grandson in the Indian Ocean tsunami. In 2019 she was awarded best actress at the 52nd edition of the Festival de Brasília for her performance in the film Dulcina.

Amayo died after a one-year battle with kidney cancer in Rio de Janeiro, on 24 January 2022, at the age of 88.

== Filmography ==
=== Television ===
Year	Title	Role	Notes
1953	Histórias do Teatro Universal	—N/a	
1954	As Quatro Irmãs	Meg	
1955	Maria Cristina	Maria Cristina	
1956	Teatrinho Trol		
1956	Grande Teatro Tupi		
1956	Teatro Moinho de Ouro		
1957	Estúdio A		
1958	Histórias da Vovó Neve		
1958	Sétimo Céu		
1959	Trágica Mentira		
1959	Orfeu da Conceição	Eurídice	
1960	Minha Mulher é um Anjo		
1963	Teatro de Equipe	—N/a	1963-1964
1964	Teatro de Comédia		
1964	Clube dos Morcegos		
1966	Senhora		
1967	O Rei dos Ciganos	Svetlana	
1967	O Porto dos Sete Destinos		
1967	A Rainha Louca	Maria de las Merces Moreno	
1967	Sangue e Areia	Pilar de Alarcon	
1967	Almas em Conflito		
1968	Passo dos Ventos	Lien	
1969	A Última Valsa	Condessa Yolanda de Izzendorf	
1970	E Nós, Aonde Vamos?	Alice	
1975	Pecado Capital	Vitória	
1975	Caso Especial	Laura	Episode:Férias sem Volta
1975	Roque Santeiro	Little Lady	Censored and Prohibited Version
1977	O Espantalho	Tônia	
1977	Caso Especial	Laura	Episode: "Férias sem Volta"
1978	Gina	Mirtes	
1980	Caso Especial	Cássia	Episode: "'Romeu e Julieta"
1981	Carga Pesada	—N/a	
1985	Caso Verdade	—N/a	Episode: "Renascer"
1985	Caso Verdade	Episode: "Amor aos 40"	
1985	Caso Verdade	Episode: "Cartas Marcadas"	
1986	Caso Verdade	—N/a	Episode: "O Amor Acontece na Vida"
1986	Tudo ou Nada	Gigi Bourbon	
1987	Carmen	Rosimar	
1991	O Portador	Laurita	
1992	Você Decide	—N/a	Episode: "Águas Passadas"
1994	Memorial de Maria Moura	Joaninha	
2000	Você Decide	Marta	Episode: "Hipocondríaca"
2004	Senhora do Destino	Dona Marlene	
2009	Malhação ID	Araci	
2009	Zorra Total	Various characters	2009–2014
2010	As Cariocas	Dona Zeni	Episode: "A Noiva do Catete"
2012	As Brasileiras	Helena	Episode: "A Desastrada de Salvador"
2013	Flor do Caribe	Rosa	
2013	Pé na Cova	F.U.I client	Episode: "Ladrão que Rouba Ladrão"
2015	Verdades Secretas	Socialite	Special participation
2015	Além do Tempo	Adélia	
2016	A Regra do Jogo	Dona Terezinha	Special participation
2017	Os Homens São de Marte...	Dona Tereza	Episode: "Fases da Separação"
2019	Topíssima	Sula Bartolomei	
2020	A Dona da Banca	Inês	Episode: "Pra mim você morreu"

=== Film ===
Year	Title	Role
1953	Perdidos de Amor	Sister
1953	Santa de um louco	—N/a
1955	O Diamante	—N/a
1955	Fuzileiro do Amor	Maria
1958	Na corda bamba	Luiza
1958	O Barbeiro que se Vira	Lili
1959	O Camelô da Rua Larga	Nancy
1960	Eu Sou o Tal	—N/a
1991	A Viagem de Volta	Herself
2014	S.O.S. Mulheres ao Mar	Sônia
2014	Não Pare na Pista	Dona Lilisa
2015	Sorria, Você Esta Sendo Filmado – O Filme	Neighbor I
2017	Doidas e Santas	Neighbor
2019	Sai de Baixo - O Filme	Leonor Fróes
2019	Dulcina	Herself

== Stage ==
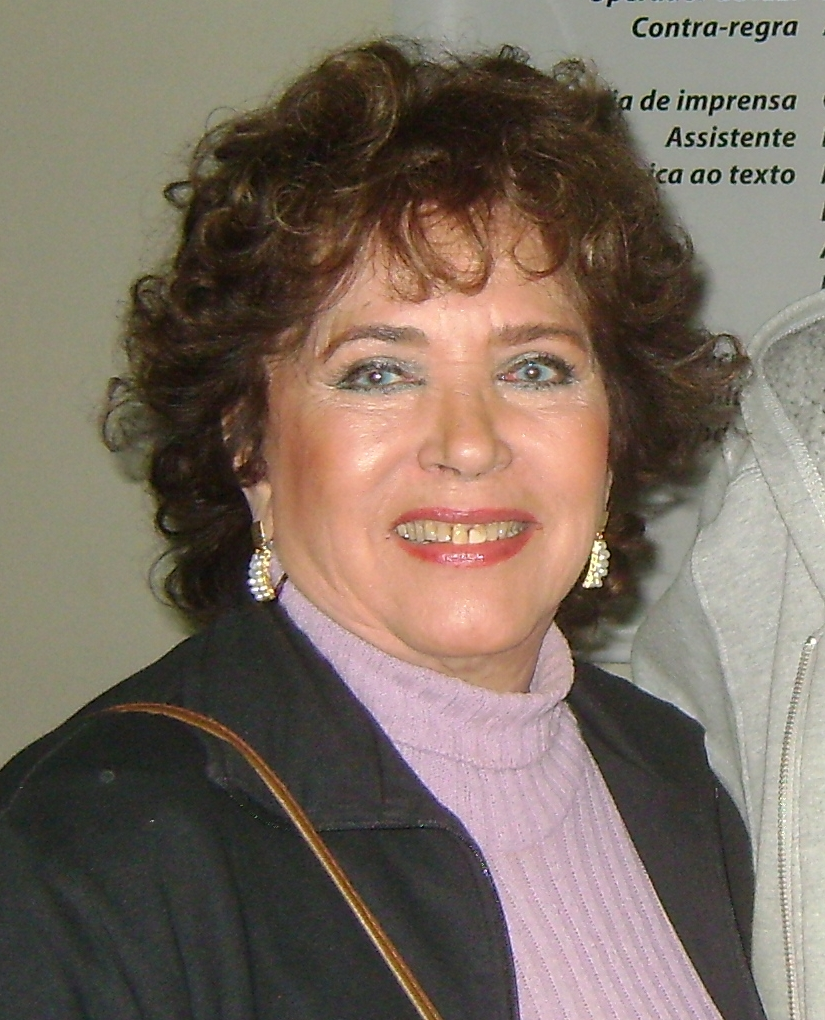
Amayo in 2011

- Irene – by Pedro Bloch. Theater debut in Rio, title role, great success in Portugal (Cia. Dulcina – Odilon)
- As Bruxas já foram Meninas (Cia. Cesar Borba)
- A Cegonha se Diverte (Cia. Artista Unidos)
- Um Cravo Na Lapela (Cia. Artistas Unidos)
- Mulheres Feias (Cia. Artistas Unidos)
- Daqui não Saio (Cia. Artistas Unidos)
- É do Amor que se Trata (Cia. Artistas Unidos)
- Pindura Saia (Cia. Graça Mello)
- Três em Lua de Mel (Cia. André Villon – Floriano Faisal)
- Irma la Douce (musical – Cia. Antônio de Cabo)
- Pepsi – Adultério Adulterado (Teatro Santa Rosa)
- Um Raio de Sol (Cia. Teatro Permanente de Brasília – Founded by the Brasini couple in Brasília)
- Divórcio (Cia. Teatro Permanente de Brasília)
- O Noviço (Cia. Teatro Permanente de Brasília)
- O Rapto das Cebolinhas (Cia. Teatro Permanente de Brasília)
- Seis Personagens à Procura de Autor (Cia. Tônia Carreiro – Paulo Autran, in Portugal )
- As Inocentes do Leblon (Cia. Antonio de Cabo)
- A Teia de Aranha (Cia. Antonio de Cabo)
- Um Vizinho em Nossas Vidas (Cia. Amayo – Brasini)
- Aqui e Agora (Cia. Jorge Ayer)
- Pequenos Burgueses (Teatro Vivo/ Etty Fraser & Chico Martins – SP)
- A Guerra Mais ou Menos Santa (Inauguration Teatro Princesa Isabel –RJ)
- A Moratória – by Jorge Andrade (2004)
- Liberdade para as borboletas – by Gershe, replacing Débora Duarte
- A Moratória – by Jorge Andrade (2006)
- A Vida É Uma Ópera – (2008)
- A Garota do Biquini Vermelho – by Artur Xexeo – Barata Produções ( 2010)
- As Eruditas – de Molière – Cia. Limite 151 (2011–2012)
- Theresè Raquin – Cia.Limite 151 (2014)
- Tricotando – 2017

== Radio ==
- ''A Juventude Cria'' – program carried out by students at Colégio Pedro II (Rádio MEC)
- ''Terra Brasileira'' – Ministry of Finance program (Rádio MEC)
- ''França Eterna'' – French Embassy program (Radio MEC)
- ''Doce França'' – French Embassy program (Radio MEC)
- '' Novela das 18:00 Horas '' (Radio Guanabara)
- ''O mundo em suas mãos'' (Rádio Mayrink Veiga)

== Awards and nominations ==
Year	Festival	Category	Work nominated	Result
2019	Festival de Brasília – Mostra BRB de Cinema	Best Actress	Dulcina	Won

== Bibliography ==
- Theresa Amayo - Ficção e Realidade.
