= God Is Brazilian =

2003 film by Carlos Diegues

- Theatrical release poster
- Portuguese: Deus É Brasileiro
- Directed by: Carlos Diegues
- Screenplay by: João Ubaldo Ribeiro; Carlos Diegues; João Emanuel Carneiro (Note: Collaboration); Renata Almeida Magalhães
- Based on: O Santo que Não Acreditava em Deus by João Ubaldo Ribeiro
- Produced by: Renata Almeida Magalhães
- Starring: Antônio Fagundes; Wagner Moura; Paloma Duarte; Bruce Gomlevsky; Stepan Nercessian; Hugo Carvana; Castrinho; Chico de Assis
- Cinematography: Affonso Beato
- Edited by: Sérgio Mekler
- Music by: Chico Neves; Hermano Vianna
- Production companies: Luz Mágica Produções; Tele Image; Globo Filmes
- Distributed by: Columbia TriStar Film Distributors International
- Release date: 31 January 2003 (Brazil)
- Running time: 110 minutes
- Country: Brazil
- Language: Portuguese
- Budget: R$7 million
- Box office: R$10.6 million

God Is Brazilian (Portuguese: Deus É Brasileiro) is a 2003 Brazilian fantasy comedy-drama film co-written and directed by Carlos Diegues, based on the short story O Santo que Não Acreditava em Deus by João Ubaldo Ribeiro. In the film, God, portrayed by Antônio Fagundes, decides to take a vacation and heads to Northeastern Brazil to find a saint as a replacement. Filming took place over the course of 64 days in the Brazilian states of Tocantins, Alagoas, Pernambuco and Rio de Janeiro.

== Plot ==
Taoca, a part-time fisherman and small-time con artist, finds a man holding on to a buoy in the middle of the ocean. The man claims he is God, but Taoca doesn't believe him until he performs some miracles.

It seems God has decided to take a break and is searching for someone to temporarily take over. With Taoca, God travels the country in hopes of finding a new saint who is fit for the job. Along the way, they meet a woman, Madá, who joins the two in hopes they will take her to São Paulo, where her mother has died.

Eventually, the trio comes across a young man who appears to have the right qualifications, except he has no belief in a higher power.

== Cast ==
- Antônio Fagundes as God
- Wagner Moura as Taoca
- Paloma Duarte as Madá
- Hugo Carvana as Quincas Batalha
- Stepan Nercessian as Baudelé
- Bruce Gomlevsky as Quinca das Mulas
- Castrinho as Goró
- Chico de Assis as Cezão
- Thiago Farias as Messias
- Susana Werner as Senhorita Agá
- Toni Garrido as São Pedro
