= Lampião e Maria Bonita (1982 TV miniseries) =

Brazilian miniseries

- Genre: Romance; Drama
- Created by: Aguinaldo Silva; Doc Comparato
- Directed by: Luís Antônio Piá; Paulo Afonso Grisolli
- Starring: Nelson Xavier; Tânia Alves; Roberto Bonfim; Regina Dourado; José Dumont; Cláudio Corrêa e Castro
- Opening theme: "Mulher Nova, Bonita e Carinhosa" by Amelinha
- Country of origin: Brazil
- Original language: Portuguese
- No. of episodes: 8

Production
- Producer: Paulo Afonso Grisolli
- Camera setup: Multiple-camera setup
- Running time: 50 minutes

Original release
- Network: TV Globo
- Release: 26 April – 5 May 1982

Lampião e Maria Bonita is a Brazilian miniseries produced by TV Globo and shown from April 26 to May 5, 1982, in 8 chapters. Written by Aguinaldo Silva and Doc Comparato, it was directed by Luís Antônio Piá and Paulo Afonso Grisolli.

Nelson Xavier and Tânia Alves played the main characters, Lampião and Maria Bonita, in a plot that tells the story of the last months of the life of the cangaceiro Virgulino Ferreira da Silva.

== Synopsis ==
The plot tells the story of the last months of Lampião and Maria Bonita. The story begins when Lampião's gang kidnaps the English geologist Steve Chandler. Using Joana Bezerra as an intermediary, the group demands 40,000 contos de réis as payment from the Government of Bahia. Sergeant Libório passes the note with the information to the Governor, but it later falls into the hands of journalist Lindolfo Macedo, who discovers the Governor's plan to kidnap Argemiro, Lampião's brother unrelated to the cangaço, intending to exploit the fact. Together with the British Embassy, the government sends Lieutenant Zé Rufino, a persecutor of Lampião. At a certain point in the plot, Maria Bonita disappears to have an abortion and, when she returns ill, she is taken into the care of the geologist who falls in love with the girl. After the Embassy refuses to pay the ransom, Lieutenant Zé Batista's motorcade finds the couple, who, at dawn on July 28, 1938, are machine-gunned without any possibility of defense.

== Cast ==
Actor/Actress	Character	Ref.
Nelson Xavier	Lampião	
Tânia Alves	Maria Bonita	
Roberto Bonfim	Sergeant Libório	
Regina Dourado	Joana Bezerra	
Hileana Menezes	Alice	
Lu Mendonça	Dadá	
Antônio Pompeo	Sabonete	
Helber Rangel	Lindolfo Macedo	
Marco Antônio Soares	telegraphist	

=== Special guests ===
Actor	Character	Ref.
José Dumont	Lieutenant Zé Rufino	
Arnaud Rodrigues	Charles G. Leavitt	
Cláudio Corrêa e Castro	Euclides Fonseca	
Jofre Soares	Colonel Pedrosa	

=== Invited actors ===
Actor	Character	Ref.
Michael Menaugh	Steve Chandler	
John Procter	Mr. Fry	

=== Supporting cast ===
Actor/Actress	Character	Ref.
Henrique Costa	Caixa de Fósforo	
Evandro Silva	Novo Tempo	
Sílvio Correia Lima	Corisco	
Jomba	Manoel Severo	
José Fernandes	Argemiro	
B. de Paiva	huntsman	
Maria Alves	Mabel	
Armando Nascimento	Getúlio Vargas	
Marcus Vinícius	Gavião	
Gilson Moura	Lieutenant Zé Batista	
Teresa Cristina	Cila	
Jurandir de Oliveira	Antônio de Engracia	
Jurema Pena	Mariinha	
Leônidas Aguiar	crawler	
Ilva Niño	Odete	
Anilda Leão	Agregada	
Adriana Barbosa	Expedita	
Nestor Capoeira	Amarelo	
Beto Leão	country boy	
Fernando Palitot	Soldier Sandes	
Sérgio Sampaio	Feliciano	
Sônia Borges	Eufrásia	
Wanda Katiuscia	Cipriana	
Rubens de Araújo	Dr. Eustáquio	

== Production ==
It was TV Globo's first experience with the miniseries format. The miniseries was awarded the gold medal at the New York International Film and Television Festival.

== Exhibition ==
It was first reprised between March 5 and 16, 1984 at 10:15 p.m., replacing Bandidos da Falange. It was shown for the second time in July 1988 (only for the Federal District); in a compact version of 5 chapters. The third time was in 1990 at the 25 Years Festival. The fourth time between June 24 and 28, 1991, in the Vale a Pena Ver de Novo session with the same compact version of 5 chapters, replacing O Tempo e o Vento. The most recent reprise, a fifth time, on January 22, 2015, at the Luz, Câmera, 50 Anos Festival, in a special edition, as a telefilm, compressed into two hours.

== See also ==
- Virgulino Ferreira da Silva - Lampião
- Cangaço
