= Malu Rocha =

Brazilian actress

- Born: August 6, 1947; Ourinhos, São Paulo, Brazil
- Died: June 7, 2013 (aged 65); São Paulo, Brazil
- Occupation: Actress
- Years active: 1972–2009

Malu Rocha (6 August 1947 – 7 June 2013) was a Brazilian actress.

== Filmography ==
=== Film ===
- 1972 - Geração em Fuga
- 1977 - O Crime do Zé Bigorna
- 1977 - Mágoa de Boiadeiro
- 1979 - Bandido, Fúria do Sexo
- 1984 - Como Salvar Meu Casamento

=== Television ===
- 1975 - Pecado Capital as Cibele
- 1982 - O Pátio das Donzelas
- 1982 - O Homem Proibido
- 1983 - Eu Prometo as Sônia
- 2001 - Amor e Ódio as Ema Cortes
- 2007 - Paraíso Tropical as Cely
- 2007 - Sete Pecados
- 2008 - Beleza Pura as Aracy
- 2009 - Maysa: Quando Fala o Coração as Dona Rosa

== Death ==
She died on 7 June 2013 aged 65 from complications due to a disease that affects the nervous system, known as prion.
