= Lucio Flavio (film) =

1977 film directed by Héctor Babenco

- Theatrical release poster
- Directed by: Héctor Babenco
- Written by: José Louzeiro; Jorge Durán; Héctor Babenco
- Produced by: Carlos Alberto Diniz; Sérgio Othero de Freitas; Maranhão Torres; Sérgio Coelho
- Starring: Reginaldo Faria
- Cinematography: Lauro Escorel
- Edited by: Sílvio Renoldi
- Music by: John Neschling
- Production company: H. B. Filmes
- Distributed by: Embrafilme
- Release dates: November 22, 1977 (SPIFF); February 27, 1978 (theatrical release)
- Running time: 125 minutes
- Country: Brazil
- Language: Portuguese

Lucio Flavio (Portuguese: Lúcio Flávio, o Passageiro da Agonia) is a 1977 Brazilian film directed by Héctor Babenco based on the book of the same name by José Louzeiro, who co-wrote the screenplay. It stars Reginaldo Faria as Lúcio Flávio, a famous bandit in Rio de Janeiro in the 1970s. Babenco did not want to limit the story to Lúcio Flávio, and stated it was also a film about Esquadrão da Morte, a death squad from the 1960s.

== Cast ==
- Reginaldo Faria as Lúcio Flávio
- Ana Maria Magalhães as Janice
- Grande Otelo as Dondinho
- Ivan Cândido as Bechara
- Lady Francisco as Lígia
- Milton Gonçalves as 132
- Paulo César Peréio as Dr. Moretti
- Stepan Nercessian
- José Dumont

== Release and reception ==
It premiered on November 22, 1977 at the 1st São Paulo International Film Festival, where it was elected the Best Film by the audience. In February 1978, it won the Best Actor (Faria), Best Supporting Actor (Cândido), Best Cinematography and Best Editing awards at the Gramado Film Festival. The film also entered the Taormina Film Fest, where it won the Best Actor Award. It debuted on the commercial circuit with 100 copies, breaking King Kong's 81, on February 27, 1978. As of November 2014, Lucio Flavio was the sixth most-watched Brazilian film with an audience of 5,401,325.
