= André, a Cara e a Coragem =

1971 film directed by Xavier de Oliveira

- Directed by: Xavier de Oliveira
- Release date: 1971
- Country: Brazil

André a Cara e a Coragem is a Brazilian drama film, produced in 1971 and directed by Xavier de Oliveira.

== Cast ==
- Stepan Nercessian
- Angela Valerio
- Antonio Patiño
- Maria Regina
- Ecchio Reis
- Ilva Niño
- Pichin Plá
- Edil Magliari
- Maria Rita
- José de Freitas
