= Mandala (TV series) =

- Genre: Telenovela
- Created by: Dias Gomes
- Directed by: Ricardo Waddington; Roberto Talma
- Starring: Vera Fischer; Nuno Leal Maia; Giulia Gam; Taumaturgo Ferreira; Felipe Camargo; Lúcia Veríssimo; Gianfrancesco Guarnieri; Célia Helena; Gracindo Júnior; Raul Cortez; Oswaldo Loureiro; Ângela Leal; Milton Gonçalves; Ruth de Souza; Fafy Siqueira
- Opening theme: "Mitos" by César Camargo Mariano
- Country of origin: Brazil
- Original language: Portuguese
- No. of episodes: 185

Production
- Running time: 50 minutes

Original release
- Network: TV Globo
- Release: 12 October 1987 – 14 May 1988

Mandala is a Brazilian telenovela produced and broadcast by TV Globo. It premiered on 12 October 1987 and ended on 14 May 1988, with a total of 185 episodes. It's the thirty eighth "novela das oito" to be aired on the timeslot. It is created by Dias Gomes and directed by Ricardo Waddington. Its central story is a loose adaptation of the play Oedipus Rex, a Greek tragedy by Sophocles.

== Plot ==
Rio de Janeiro, 1961. Jocasta, a sociology student and daughter of communist activist Túlio Silveira, is 18 years old and actively involved in the country’s political scene, which has been shaken by the resignation of President Jânio Quadros. She is in love with Laio, her polar opposite—an alienated, esoteric young man who lives off an allowance from his wealthy father, businessman Michel Lunardo.

A mystic, Laio never takes a step without consulting his guru and friend Argemiro, whom he turns to when he learns of Jocasta’s pregnancy. The cowrie shells reveal that his son will kill him and that he will have a romantic relationship with his mother. Terrified, Laio disappears with the child as soon as she is born, with the complicity of Argemiro—who loves Laio and hates Jocasta.

Twenty-five years later, Jocasta is a successful but restless woman, searching for her missing son. She is separated from Laio, who in recent years has expanded his father’s fortune by getting involved in illegal gambling. On a road, he encounters Édipo, unaware that he is his son. After an argument with the young man, Laio falls off a cliff and dies.

While being courted by the bookie Tony Carrado—a rough-around-the-edges but good-natured fellow—Jocasta falls in love with the young Édipo, unaware that he is, in fact, her long-lost son. Raised by a childless couple, Édipo is endowed with paranormal powers. In the future, he will have to face Argemiro in a battle between good and evil.

== Cast ==
- Vera Fischer - Jocasta Silveira
- Nuno Leal Maia - Tony Carrado
- Lúcia Veríssimo - Letícia
- Carlos Augusto Strazzer - Argemiro
- Felipe Camargo - Édipo Junqueira
- Gianfrancesco Guarnieri - Túlio Silveira
- Célia Helena - Ceres Silveira
- Gracindo Júnior - Creonte Silveira
- Raul Cortez - Pedro Bergman
- Oswaldo Loureiro - Américo Junqueira
- Ângela Leal - Mercedes Junqueira
- Imara Reis - Vera
- Osmar Prado - Gerson Silveira
- Bia Seidl - Mariana
- Paulo Gracindo - Vovô Pepê (Petronílio Silveira)
- Yara Côrtes - D. Conchita
- Ilka Soares - Lena
- Milton Gonçalves - Apolinário Santana
- Aída Leiner - Eurídice Barbosa Santana
- Grande Otelo - Jonas Caetano Barbosa
- Ruth de Souza - Zezé (Maria José Barbosa)
- Aracy Cardoso - Flora
- Betina Viany - Ondina (Madame Lorrain)
- Jayme Periard - Miguel
- Jandir Ferrari - Toninho Carrado
- Betty Erthal - Dalva
- Lupe Gigliotti - Dona Severina
- Fafy Siqueira - Jupira
- Carlos Kroeber - Dr. Henrique
- Reynaldo Gonzaga - Nando (Fernando)
- Chico Diaz - Rafael
- Maria Alves - Carmem Barbosa Santana
- Marcos Breda - Hans
- Antônio Grassi - Zé Mário
- Chico Tenreiro - Pinto
- Luiz Magnelli - Soneca
- Felipe Martins - Wanderley
- Tony Ferreira
- Waldir Onofre
- Giulia Gam - Jocasta (young)
- Taumaturgo Ferreira - Laio Lunardo (young)
- Suzana Faini - Glória Lunardo (Laio's mother)
- Walmor Chagas - Michel Lunardo
- Marco Antônio Pâmio - Argemiro
- Marcos Palmeira - Creonte
- Deborah Evelyn - Vera (young)
- Lília Cabral - Lena
- Mauro Mendonça - Adroaldo (Vera's father)
- Beatriz Lyra - Estela (Vera's mother)
- Daniel Dantas - Otávio
- Paulo César Pereio - Capitão (smuggler)
- Danton Mello - Gerson
- Marina Miranda - Jocasta's family maid
- Carlos Wilson - Pai-de-santo who helps Laio
- Luiz Sérgio Lima e Silva - Director of Brazilian Communist Party
- Daniel Trindade - Jorge
- Ana Luiza Follay - Laio's secretary
- Júlio Levy - Michel's butler
- Schulamith Yaari - Nurse in the maternity hospital where Édipo was born
- Perry Salles - Laio Lunardo
- Marcelo Picchi - Chris
- Rubens Corrêa - Psychoanalyst of Édipo
- Yara Amaral - Rafael's mother
- Castro Gonzaga - Gilberto
- Francisco Milani - Efigênio
- Breno Bonin - Luís
- Gisela Arnoud - Luciana
- Esmeralda Hannah - Marli
- Rejane Goulart - Beatriz
- Walney Costa - Sinésio
- Luciana Fontenelli - Isabel
- Anna Gallo - Marlucy
- Cleonir dos Santos - Fiapo
- Theresa Mascarenhas - Marcene
- Christovam Netto - Tico-Tico
- Paulo Camargo - Marcos
