= Sergeant Getulio =

1983 film

- Theatrical release poster
- Directed by: Hermanno Penna
- Written by: Flávio Porto; Hermanno Penna
- Based on: Sargento Getúlio by João Ubaldo Ribeiro
- Produced by: Carlos Augusto Oliveir; Walter Carvalho Correa; Christiano André Magini; Hermanno Penna
- Starring: Lima Duarte
- Cinematography: Walter Carvalho
- Edited by: Láercio Silva
- Music by: José Luiz Penna; Mauro Giorgetti
- Production company: Blimp Film
- Distributed by: Embrafilme
- Release date: 29 May 1983
- Running time: 85 minutes
- Country: Brazil
- Language: Portuguese

Sergeant Getulio (Portuguese: Sargento Getúlio) is a 1983 Brazilian drama film directed by Hermanno Penna. It was shot in Rio de Janeiro's neighborhood São Cristóvão and Laranjeiras, as well as in Sergipe's municipalities Nossa Senhora da Glória, Aracaju, Barra dos Coqueiros, and Poço Redondo.

== Cast ==
- Lima Duarte as Getúlio
- Orlando Vieira as Amaro
- Luiz A. Barreto
- Fernando Bezerra
- Amaral Cavalcante
- Márcia de Lima
- Ethel de Souza
- Marieta Fontes
- Antonio Leite
- Antônio Lima
- Inez Maciel

== Reception ==
At the 1983 Gramado Film Festival, it won the Best Film Award, while Duarte and Vieira won the Best Actor and Best Supporting Actor respectively. Duarte also won the Best Actor Award at the 5th Havana Film Festival. Sargento Getúlio was nominated for Best Film Award at the 13th Moscow International Film Festival.
