= Cláudia Raia =

Brazilian actress (born 1966)

- Raia in 2026
- Born: Maria Cláudia Motta Raia; 23 December 1966 (age 59); Campinas, São Paulo, Brazil
- Occupations: Actress, singer, dancer, producer
- Years active: 1983–present
- Height: 1.78 m (5 ft 10 in)
- Spouses: Alexandre Frota (m. 1986; div. 1989) Edson Celulari (m. 1993; div. 2010) Jarbas Homem de Mello (m. 2018)
- Children: 3

Maria Cláudia Motta Raia (born 23 December 1966) is a Brazilian actress, singer, dancer, and stage producer.

== Biography ==
Raia was born in Campinas and was married to Edson Celulari from 1993 until 2010. They had two children: Enzo Celulari and Sophia Raia. She is married to artist Jarbas Homem de Mello and had her third child at 56 years old, called Luca. Her first Rede Globo telenovela was Roque Santeiro, created by Dias Gomes. Ever since, she has starred in many other Globo telenovelas.

== Television roles ==
=== Television ===
Year	Title	Role	Notes
1985	Roque Santeiro	Ninon/Maria do Carmo	
1987	O Outro	Edwiges	
1987	Sassaricando	Tancinha (Constância Gutiérrez de Pádua)	
1987/92	TV Pirata	Tonhão and Penelope	
1990	Rainha da Sucata	Adriana Figueroa "Adriana Ross"	
1991	Vamp	Celeste	
1992	Deus nos Acuda	Maria Escandalosa (Maria Rodrigues Garcia)	
1993/99	Você Decide		
1995	Engraçadinha... Seus Amores e Seus Pecados	Engraçadinha	
1995	A Próxima Vítima	Última Vítima	
1995	A Comédia da Vida Privada	Paola	
1996	Não Fuja da Raia		
1998	Torre de Babel	Ângela Vidal	
1999	Sai de Baixo	Petúnia Baaleiro	
1999	Mulher		
1999	Terra Nostra	Hortência	
2000	Brava Gente	Karla	
2001/03	Os Normais	Michelle and Marcela Magrela	
2001	As Filhas da Mãe	Ramona / Ramón Cavalcante	
2002	O Beijo do Vampiro	Mina de Montmarte	
2003	Sítio do Picapau Amarelo	Medéia	
2005	Mad Maria	Tereza	
2005	Belíssima	Safira Solomos Güney	
2006	Minha Nada Mole Vida	Brenda Karla	
2007	Sete Pecados	Ágatha Trindade	
2008	A Favorita	Donatela Fontini	
2010	A Grande Família	Vânia Lira	Special participation
2010	Ti Ti Ti	Jaqueline Maldonado	
2012	Salve Jorge	Lívia Marini	
2014	Alto Astral	Samantha Santana "Samantha, the Paranormal"	
2016	Haja Coração	Herself	
2016	A Lei do Amor	Salete Meloni	
2019	Verão 90	Lidiane "Lidi Pantera"	

== Awards and nominations ==
=== APCA Awards ===
Year	Category	Nominee / work	Result
1986	Best Promising Actress	Roque Santeiro	Won
1991	Best Supporting Actress in a Motion Picture	Boca de Ouro	Won

=== Art Quality Brazil Awards ===
Year	Category	Nominee / work	Result
2006	Best Supporting Actress – Television	Belíssima	Won
2008	Best Actress – Television	A Favorita	Nominated
2010	Best Actress – Television	Ti Ti Ti	Nominated
2015	Best Leading Actress in a Musical	Raia 30 - O Musical	Nominated

=== Best of the Year – Globe Awards ===
Year	Category	Nominee / work	Result
1998	Best Actress in a Telenovela	Torre de Babel	Nominated
2008	Best Actress in a Telenovela	A Favorita	Nominated
2010	Best Actress in a Telenovela	Ti Ti Ti	Won
2019	Best Character of the Year	Verão 90	Won

=== Bibi Ferreira Awards ===
Year	Category	Nominee / work	Result
2013	Best Leading Actress in a Play	Cabaret	Nominated
2018	Best Supporting Actress in a Play	Cantando na Chuva - O Musical	Won

=== Contigo! Awards ===
Year	Category	Nominee / work	Result
2002	Best Romantic Couple (with Alexandre Borges)	As Filhas da Mãe	Nominated
2006	Best Supporting Actress – Television	Belíssima	Won
2009	Best Leading Actress – Television	A Favorita	Nominated
2010	Best Supporting Actress in a Motion Picture (critic choice)	Os Normais 2 - A Noite mais Maluca de Todas	Nominated
2010	Best Supporting Actress in a Motion Picture (public choice)	Os Normais 2 - A Noite mais Maluca de Todas	Won
2011	Best Leading Actress – Television	Ti Ti Ti	Won
2014	Best Leading Actress – Television	Alto Astral	Nominated
2019	Best Supporting Actress – Television	Verão 90	Nominated

=== Extra Television Awards ===
Year	Category	Nominee / work	Result
2006	Best Actress	Belíssima	Nominated
2008	Best Actress	A Favorita	Nominated
2010	Best Actress	Ti Ti Ti	Nominated
2015	Best Supporting Actress	Alto Astral	Nominated

=== Press Trophy ===
Year	Category	Nominee / work	Result
1986	Outstanding Performance by an Newcomer Actress	Roque Santeiro	Won
1993	Outstanding Performance by an Actress in a Telenovela	Deus nos Acuda	Nominated
1999	Outstanding Performance by an Actress in a Telenovela	Torre de Babel	Nominated
2009	Outstanding Performance by an Actress in a Telenovela	A Favorita	Nominated
2011	Outstanding Performance by an Actress in a Telenovela	Ti Ti Ti	Nominated

=== Quem Awards ===
Year	Category	Nominee / work	Result
2010	Best Leading Actress – Television	Ti Ti Ti	Nominated
2012	Best Leading Actress – Television	Salve Jorge	Nominated
2015	Best Leading Actress in a Play	Raia 30 - O Musical	Nominated
