= Pedra sobre Pedra =

Brazilian telenovela directed by Luiz Fernando Carvalho

Pedra sobre Pedra (Portuguese for Stone over Stone) is a Brazilian telenovela co-produced by TV Globo (Brazil) and RTP (Portugal). It aired in Brazil from 6 January to 31 July 1992, with 179 episodes.

It was made available on the Globoplay streaming service on 18 July 2022.

== Cast ==
- Lima Duarte .... Murilo Pontes
- Renata Sorrah .... Pilar Farias Batista
- Maurício Mattar .... Leonardo Pontes
- Adriana Esteves .... Marina Farias Batista
- Fábio Júnior .... Jorge Tadeu
- Andréa Beltrão .... Ursula Pontes
- Arlete Salles .... Francisquinha
- Eloísa Mafalda... Gioconda Pontes
- Armando Bogus .... Cândido Alegria
- Eva Wilma .... Hilda Pontes
- Osmar Prado .... Sérgio Cabeleira
- Luíza Tomé .... Vida
- Ênio Gonçalves .... Diamantino
- Humberto Martins .... Iago
- Carla Marins .... Eliane
- Isadora Ribeiro .... Suzana Frota
- Eduardo Moscovis .... Tibor
- Marco Nanini .... Ivonaldo
- Elizângela .... Rosemary
- Paula Burlamaqui .... Nair
- Tânia Alves .... Lola
- Pedro Paulo Rangel .... Adamastor
- Cecil Thiré .... Kleber Vilares(prefeito da cidade)
- Nívea Maria .... Ximena Vilares
- Míriam Pires .... Dona Quirina Batista
- Carlos Daniel .... Ernesto
- Suzana Borges .... Inês
- Nelson Xavier .... Delegado Queiroz
- Lu Mendonça .... Nice
- Raymundo de Souza .... Sete Estrelas/Emanuel
- Selton Mello .... Bruno
- Lília Cabral .... Alva
- Nuno Leal Maia .... Laíre
- Reinaldo Gonzaga .... P. H.
- Maria Mariana .... Olímpia
- Teresa Seiblitz .... Jerusa
- Thelma Reston .... Romena
- Ilva Niño .... Naninha
- Buza Ferraz .... Benvido Soares

=== Special guests ===
- Andréa Murucci .... Hilda Pontes (jovem)
- Cláudia Scher .... Pilar Farias Batista (jovem)
- Elias Gleizer .... motorista de ônibus
- Felipe Camargo .... Jerônimo Batista
- Lucilio Gomes .... Luciano (Empresario de Diamentes)
- Marcio Ehrlich .... Van Damme, negociante belga de diamantes
- Nelson Baskerville .... Murilo Pontes (jovem)
