= Elizângela =

Brazilian actress (1954–2023)

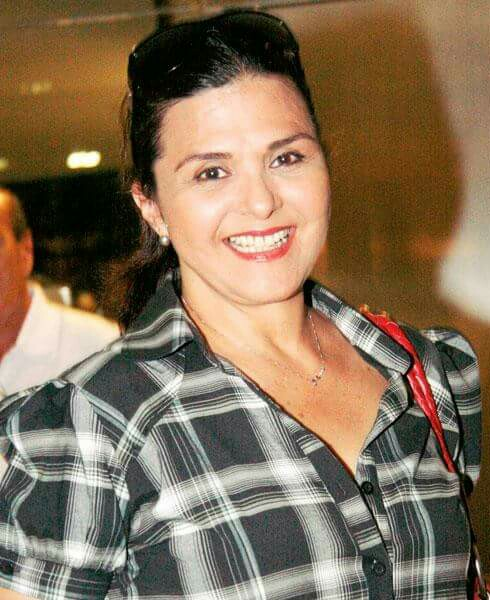
- Elizângela in 2004
- Born: Elizângela do Amaral Vergueiro; 11 December 1954; Rio de Janeiro, Federal District, Brazil
- Died: 3 November 2023 (aged 68); Guapimirim, Rio de Janeiro, Brazil
- Occupations: Actress; singer; television presenter
- Years active: 1961–2023
- Spouses: Jorge Humberto Moreira (m. 1972; div. 1979) José (m. 1993; div. 2001)
- Children: 1

Elizângela do Amaral Vergueiro (11 December 1954 – 3 November 2023), known mononymously as Elizângela, was a Brazilian actress, singer and television presenter who played a lead role in the 1977 telenovela Locomotivas and participated in several other telenovelas and films.

== Biography ==
Elizângela was the youngest of three sisters. Her father was an executive and her mother was a housewife. Her parents split up when she was one and a half years old, and so, she had very little contact with her father. Her mother was a manicurist after the separation, and had to bring up the three daughters alone, with a small pension from the ex-husband. Going through difficulties, she then began working as a child, at the age of 8.

Elizângela died of a cardiac arrest on 3 November 2023, at the age of 68.

== Filmography ==
Soap operas and serials
Year	Series	Character	Network
1971	O Cafona	Dalva	(Globo)
1971	Bandeira 2	Taís	(Globo)
1972	O Bofe	Sandra	(Globo)
1973	Cavalo de Aço	Teresa	(Globo)
1975	Pecado Capital	Emilene	(Globo)
1975	Cuca Legal	Lu	(Globo)
1976	O Casarão	Mônica	(Globo)
1976	O Feijão e o Sonho	Cidoca	(Globo)
1977	Locomotivas	Patrícia	(Globo)
1978	Te Contei?	Ritinha	(Globo)
1979	Feijão Maravilha	Adelaide	(Globo)
1980	Plumas & Paetês	Sandra	(Globo)
1981	Jogo da Vida	Mariúcha	(Globo)
1982	Paraíso	Maria Rosa	(Globo)
1983	Voltei pra Você	Lucinha	(Globo)
1984	Partido Alto	Cidinha	(Globo)
1985	Roque Santeiro	Marilda	(Globo)
1986	Tudo ou Nada	Guadalupe	(TV Manchete)
1992	Pedra sobre Pedra	Rosemary Pontes	(Globo)
1994	Éramos Seis	Marion	(SBT)
1994	As Pupilas do Senhor Reitor	Teresa	(SBT)
1996	Malhação	Zenaide (Zizi)	(Globo)
1997	Por Amor	Magnólia	(Globo)
1999	Suave Veneno	Nazaré	(Globo)
2001	O Clone	Noêmia	(Globo)
2004	Senhora do Destino	Djenane / Edileuza	(Globo)
2005	A Lua Me Disse	Assunta	(Globo)
2006	Cobras & Lagartos	Shirley Miranda	(Globo)
2008	A Favorita	Cilene (Jucilene Maria Gonzaga)	(Globo)
2010	Ti Ti Ti	Nicole / Daguijane Oliveira	(Globo)
2011	Aquele Beijo	Íntima Falcão	(Globo)
2012	Salve Jorge	Esma	(Globo)
2014	Segunda Dama	Edinéia dos Santos	(Globo)
2014	Império	Jurema	(Globo)
2016	A Terra Prometida	Milah	(Record)
2017	A Força do Querer	Aurora Duarte	(Globo)
2019	A Dona do Pedaço	Carmelinda	(Globo)

== Awards and nominations ==
Year	Associations	Category	Nominations	Result
1969	Santos Film Festival	Most Promising Actress	Quelé do Pajeú	Won
1970	Santos Film Festival	Best Actress	Vale do Canaã	Won
1972	Press Trophy	Favorite Female Newcomer	O Cafona	Nominated
1973	Press Trophy	Favorite Female Newcomer	O Bofe	Nominated
1976	Villa Lobos Music Awards	Best Selling Disc of the Year	Pertinho de Você	Won
1976	Contigo! Awards - The Best of The Year	Favorite Newcomer Singer	Pertinho de Você	Won
2005	Golden Tamborim Awards (Samba Trophy)	Best Actress in a Series, Comedy or Telenovela	A Lua Me Disse	Won
2011	Top of Business Awards	Best Actress in Television	Aquele Beijo	Won
2012	Top of Business Awards	Best Actress in Television	Salve Jorge	Won
2017	Globo Awards - Best of The Year	Best Supporting Actress	A Força do Querer	Nominated
2017	Extra Television Awards	Best Supporting Actress	A Força do Querer	Won
2017	Contigo! TV Awards	Best Supporting Actress in a Serie or Telenovela	A Força do Querer	Nominated
2017	APCA Awards	Best Performance by an Actress in Television	A Força do Querer	Nominated
2017	UOL TV and Famous Awards	Best Actress	A Força do Querer	Nominated
2017	My Telenovela Awards	Best Supporting Actress (critic choice)	A Força do Querer	Won
2017	My Telenovela Awards	Best Supporting Actress (public choice)	A Força do Querer	Won
2017	NaTelinha Awards	Best Supporting Actress	A Força do Querer	Won
