= The Fall (1976 film) =

1978 film

- Portuguese: A Queda
- Directed by: Ruy Guerra; Nelson Xavier
- Written by: Ruy Guerra; Nelson Xavier
- Produced by: Nei Sroulevich
- Starring: Nelson Xavier
- Cinematography: Edgar Moura
- Edited by: Ruy Guerra
- Release date: 1976
- Running time: 120 minutes
- Country: Brazil
- Language: Portuguese

The Fall (Portuguese: A Queda [a ˈkɛdɐ]) is a 1976 Brazilian drama film directed by Ruy Guerra and Nelson Xavier. It was entered into the 28th Berlin International Film Festival, where it won the Silver Bear - Special Jury Prize.

== Cast ==
- Nelson Xavier
- Hugo Carvana
- Cosme dos Santos
- Lima Duarte
- Perfeito Fortuna
- Ruy Guerra
- Leina Krespi
- Carlos Eduardo Novaes
- Paulo César Pereio
- Tonico Pereira
- Maria Sílvia
