= Aguinaldo Silva =

Brazilian Emmy-winning telenovela writer (born 1943)

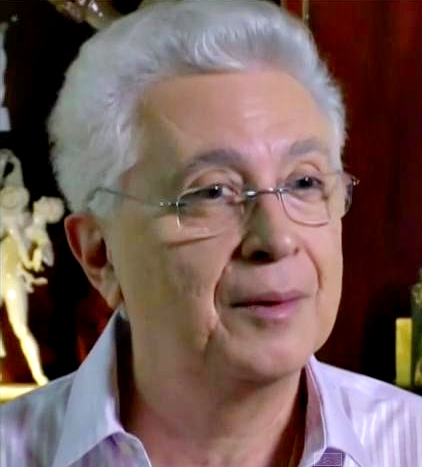
- Born: 7 June 1943 (age 82); Carpina, Pernambuco, Brazil
- Years active: 1962-present

Aguinaldo Silva OMC (Carpina, 7 June 1943) is a Brazilian Emmy-winning telenovela writer born in Carpina, Brazil.

== Filmography ==
=== Television ===
Year	Title	Credited as				
Year	Title	Creator	Writer	Text supervisor	Co-creators	Network
1984	Partido Alto	Yes	Yes	No	with Gloria Perez	Rede Globo
1985	Roque Santeiro	Yes	Yes	No	with Dias Gomes	Rede Globo
1987	O Outro	Yes	Yes	No		Rede Globo
1988	Vale Tudo	Yes	Yes	No	with Gilberto Braga and Leonor Bassères	Rede Globo
1989	Tieta	Yes	Yes	No	with Ana Maria Moretzsohn and Ricardo Linhares	Rede Globo
1992	Pedra sobre Pedra	Yes	Yes	No	with Ana Maria Moretzsohn and Ricardo Linhares	Rede Globo
1993	Fera Ferida	Yes	Yes	No	with Ana Maria Moretzsohn and Ricardo Linhares	Rede Globo
1997	A Indomada	Yes	Yes	No	with Ricardo Linhares	Rede Globo
1998	Meu Bem Querer	Yes	Yes	No	with Ricardo Linhares	Rede Globo
1999	Suave Veneno	Yes	Yes	No		Rede Globo
2001	Porto dos Milagres	Yes	Yes	No	with Ricardo Linhares	Rede Globo
2004	Senhora do Destino	Yes	Yes	No		Rede Globo
2007	Duas Caras	Yes	Yes	No		Rede Globo
2010	Tempos Modernos	No	No	Yes	with Bosco Brasil	Rede Globo
2010	Laços de Sangue	No	No	Yes	with Pedro Lopes	SIC
2011	Fina Estampa	Yes	Yes	No		Rede Globo
2013	Marido en alquiler	Yes	No	Yes	with Perla Farias	Telemundo
2014	Império	Yes	Yes	No		Rede Globo
2014	Boogie Oogie	No	No	Yes	with Rui Vilhena	Rede Globo
2018	O Sétimo Guardião	Yes	Yes	No		Rede Globo
