= Nelson Xavier =

Brazilian actor (1941–2017)

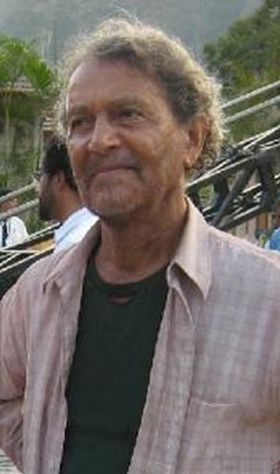
- Xavier in 2008
- Born: 30 August 1941; São Paulo, Brazil
- Died: 10 May 2017 (aged 75); Uberlândia, Minas Gerais, Brazil
- Occupation: Actor
- Years active: 1959–2017
- Spouses: Heloísa Villela (m. 1975; div. 1987) Via Negromonte (m. 1989)
- Partner: Joana Fomm (1964–1966)
- Children: 4

Nelson Agostini Xavier (Brazilian Portuguese: [ˈnɛwsõ ʃaviˈɛʁ]; 30 August 1941 – 10 May 2017) was a Brazilian actor. He appeared in more than 95 films and television shows between 1959 and 2017. He starred in the 1964 film Os Fuzis, which won the Silver Bear Extraordinary Jury Prize at the 14th Berlin International Film Festival.

In 1976, Xavier co-directed A Queda along with Ruy Guerra, a sequel to Os Fuzis. It was entered into the 28th Berlin International Film Festival, where it won the Silver Bear – Special Jury Prize.

Xavier died on 10 May 2017 in Uberlândia, Minas Gerais, of a lung disease. He was 75.

== Selected filmography ==
- Fronteiras do Inferno (1959)
- Cidade Ameaçada (1960)
- Os Fuzis (1964) - Mário
- Seara Vermelha (1964)
- A Falecida (1965) - Timbira
- Três Histórias de Amor (1966) - (segment "A Construção - Amor na Cidade")
- Arrastão (1967)
- El ABC do Amor (1967) - (segment "Pacto, O")
- Massacre no Supermercado (1968) - Detective Chico
- Desesperato (1968)
- Of Gods and the Undead (1970) - Valu
- Jardim de Guerra (1970)
- É Simonal (1970)
- Dois Perdidos numa Noite Suja (1971) - Paco
- As Confissões de Frei Abóbora (1971)
- A culpa (1971) - Henrique
- Vai Trabalhar, Vagabundo! (1972) - Babalu
- Ovelha Negra, Uma Despedida de Solteiro (1974)
- A Rainha Diaba (1974) - Catitu
- Dona Flor and Her Two Husbands (1976) - Mirandão, Vadinho's Buddy
- Soledade, a Bagaceira (1976)
- Marília e Marina (1976)
- Gordos e Magros (1976) - Benedito
- Feminino Plural (1976)
- A Queda (1978, director) - Mário
- O Bandido Antonio Do (1978)
- O Bom Burguês (1979) - Comandante Raul
- A Rainha do Rádio (1979)
- Amor e Traição (1979)
- Bububu no Bobobó (1980)
- Eles Não Usam Black-Tie (1981)
- Lampião e Maria Bonita (1982)
- Tensão no Rio (1982) - Colonel Flores
- Gabriela (1983) - Capitão
- O Mágico e o Delegado (1983) - Dom Velasquez
- O Cangaceiro Trapalhão (1983) - Lampião
- Para Viver um Grande Amor (1984) - Carioca
- O Rei do Rio (1985) - Nico
- Moon over Parador (1988) - General Sinaldo
- Césio 137 - O Pesadelo de Goiânia (1990) - Devair
- At Play in the Fields of the Lord (1991) - Father Xantes
- Vai Trabalhar, Vagabundo II - A Volta (1991)
- Lamarca (1994)
- Boca (1994) - Father Silva
- Sombras de Julho (1995)
- O Testamento do Senhor Napumoceno (1997) - Napumoceno
- Anjo Mau (1997, TV Series) - Manoel
- Girl from Rio (2001) - Bichero
- Lua Cambará - Nas Escadarias do Palácio (2002) - Líder dos Ciganos
- Benjamim (2003) - Dr. Cantagalo
- Narradores de Javé (2003) - Zaqueu
- Sítio do Picapau Amarelo (2007) - Barão de Tremembé
- Sonhos Roubados (2009) - Seu Horcio
- Chico Xavier (2010) - Chico Xavier 1969 - 1975
- Os Sonhos de um Sonhador: A História de Frank Aguiar (2010) - Chico das Dores
- As Mães de Chico Xavier (2010) - Chico Xavier
- O Filme dos Espíritos (2011) - Levy
- O Gerente (2011)
- A Despedida (2014) - Almirante
- Trash (2014) - Clemente
- A Floresta Que Se Move (2015) - Heitor
- Babilonia (2015, TV Series) - Sebastião Carvalho
- Rondon, o Desbravador (2016)
- Comeback: Um Matador Nunca se Aposenta (2016) - Amador
