= Regina Dourado =

Brazilian actress (1952–2012)

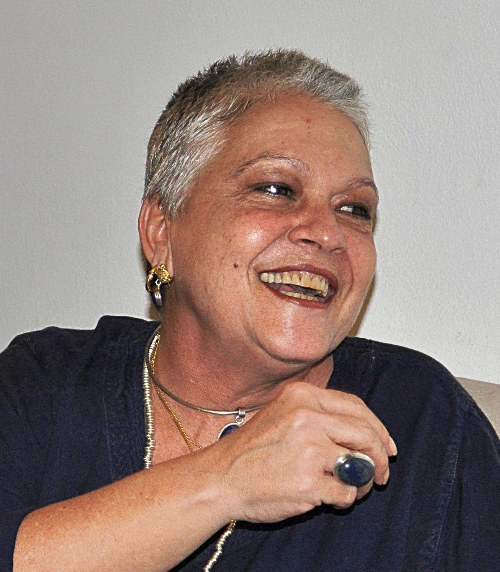

Regina Dourado (August 22, 1952 – October 27, 2012) was a Brazilian film and television actress.

Dourado was born in Irecê, Bahia, Brazil, on August 22, 1952. She joined the Companhia Baiana de Comédias, a theater group, when she was fifteen years old. She became known for numerous television, film and theater roles throughout her career.

Dourado died at the Hospital Português in Salvador, Brazil, on October 27, 2012, at the age of 60. Dourado died in 2012 of breast cancer, which she had had since 2003. She had one son.

== Filmography ==
=== Film credits ===
Year	Title	Role	Notes
1982	Lampião e Maria Bonita	Joana Bezerra	
1984	O Baiano Fantasma	Zuzu	
1985	Tigipió - Uma Questão de Amor e Honra	Matilde	
1990	Corpo em Delito	Tana	
1996	Corisco & Dadá	Filha de Dadá	
1999	No Coração dos Deuses		
2004	Espelho d'Água - Uma Viagem no Rio São Francisco	Penha	
