= João Ubaldo Ribeiro =

Brazilian writer, journalist, screenwriter and professor (1941–2014

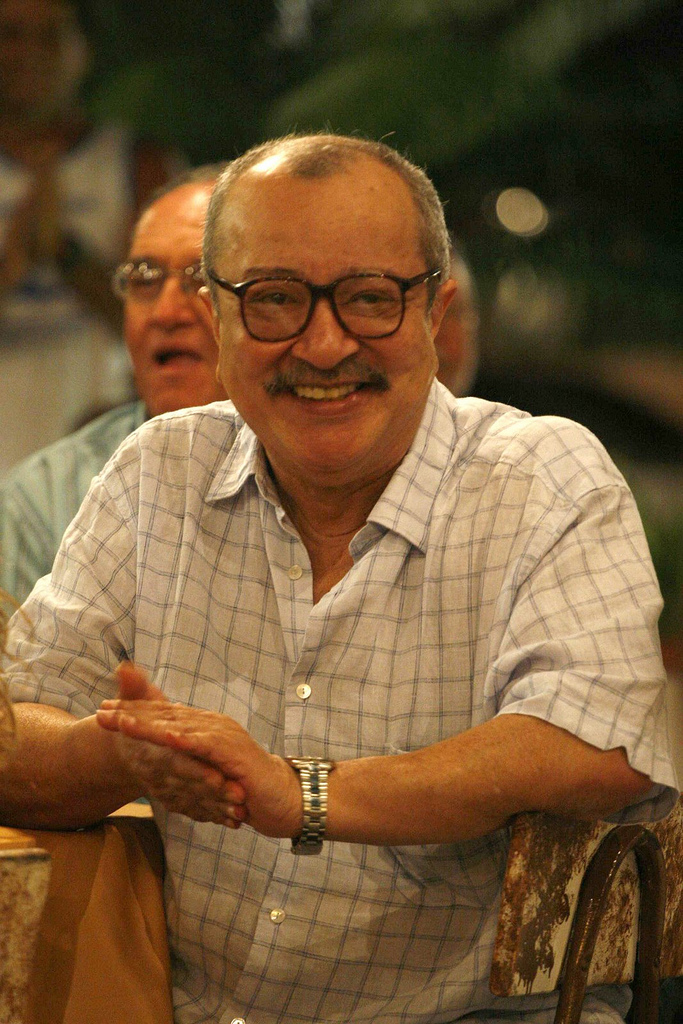
- Born: January 23, 1941; Itaparica, Bahia
- Died: July 18, 2014 (aged 73); Rio de Janeiro
- Occupation: Author

João Ubaldo Ribeiro (January 23, 1941 – July 18, 2014) was a Brazilian writer, journalist, screenwriter and professor. Several of his books and short stories have been turned into movies and TV series in Brazil. Ribeiro was a member of the Brazilian Academy of Letters, being elected in 1994. At the time of his death many considered him to be Brazil's greatest contemporary novelist.

== Biography ==
Ribeiro was the first of three children of Manoel Ribeiro and Maria Felipa Osório Pimentel. When Ribeiro was two months old, the family moved to Aracaju, in the northeastern state of Sergipe. Early on, he showed an interest in literature. In 1955, he began attending the Colégio da Bahia, along with Glauber Rocha, with whom he became friends in 1956.

In 1957, Ribeiro began working for local newspapers as a journalist. The following year, he entered the Federal University of Bahia to study law. During this time, he published several magazines and journals with Rocha. In 1959, his anthology of stories from Bahia, Lugar e circunstancia (Place and Circumstance), was published. He married his first wife, Maria Beatriz Moreira Caldas, a fellow student, in 1960. They divorced nine years later. In 1963, he wrote his first novel, Setembro não faz sentido.

In 1964, Ribeiro left the country for political reasons and went to the United States to study economics, returning the following year to lecture in political science at the Universidade Federal da Bahia. After six years, he was back on his academic career and returned to journalism. In 1969, he married the historian Monica Maria Roters, with whom he had two daughters: Emilia (born 1970) and Manuela (born 1972).

In 1971, his breakthrough novel Sargento Getúlio was published, followed three years later by Vencecavalo e o outro povo. In 1980, Ribeiro had his third marriage with Berenice Batella, with whom he had two children, Bento (born 1981) and Francisca (born 1983). In 1981, he took his family to Lisbon so he could write for the magazine Caretta.

From his return to Brazil until his death, he lived in Rio de Janeiro.

Ribeiro lived in Berlin between 1990/91 as a participant of the Berlin Artists Program of the German Academic Exchange Service (Deutscher Akademischer Austauschdienst, or DAAD). He wrote several newspaper articles, some of which recounted his experiences in the city and which later formed the basis of his book Um brasileiro em Berlim (A Brazilian in Berlin).

In 1994, Ribeiro was inducted to the Academia Brasileira de Letras (Brazilian Academy of Letters), occupying seat 34.

In 2008, Ribeiro received the Prémio Camões, the most important Portuguese-speaking literary prize. He died at the age of 73 on July 18, 2014, at his home in the Leblon neighborhood of Rio de Janeiro. Ubaldo suffered a pulmonary embolism. On July 19, his body was cremated.

== Awards and recognition ==
- 1971 Prêmio Golfinho de Ouro, do Estado do Rio de Janeiro foir the novel "Sargento Getúlio".
- Two Jabuti Prizes, for Sargento Getúlio Best Author, 1972) and Viva o Povo Brasileiro" (Novel of the Year,1984)
- 1983 Prêmio Altamente Recomendável - Fundação Nacional do Livro Infantil e Juvenil,, for "Vida e Paixão de Pandonar, o Cruel"
- 1996 Anna Seghers Prize, (Mainz, Germany);
- Blaue Brillenschlange (Zurich, Switzerland);
- 1996-Head of the Chair of Poetik Dozentur, University of Tübingen, Germany;
- 2006 Lifetime Achievement Award- Brazilian International Press Awards.
- 2008 Camões Prize
- 2010 São Paulo Prize for Literature — Shortlisted in the Best Book of the Year category for O Albatroz Azul

== Partial bibliography ==
=== Novels ===
- Setembro não tem sentido [September has no Sense]. 1968.
- Sargento Getúlio [Sergeant Getúlio]. 1971.
- Vila Real [Real Town]. 1979.
- Viva o povo brasileiro (Hail the Brazilian People, self-translated as An Invincible Memory) - 1984
- O sorriso do lagarto (The Lizard's Smile) - 1989
- O feitiço da Ilha do Pavão (The Sorcery of Peacock Island) - 1997
- A casa dos Budas ditosos (The House of the Fortunate Buddhas) - 1999
- Diário do Farol (The Lighthouse's Diary) - 2002
- O Albatroz Azul (The Blue Albatross) - 2009

=== Children's books ===
- Vida e paixão de Pandomar, o cruel [Life and Passion of Pandomar, the Cruel]. 1983.
- A vingança de Charles Tiburone [The Revenge of Charles Tiburone]. 1990.
