= Eva Todor =

Brazilian actress and dancer

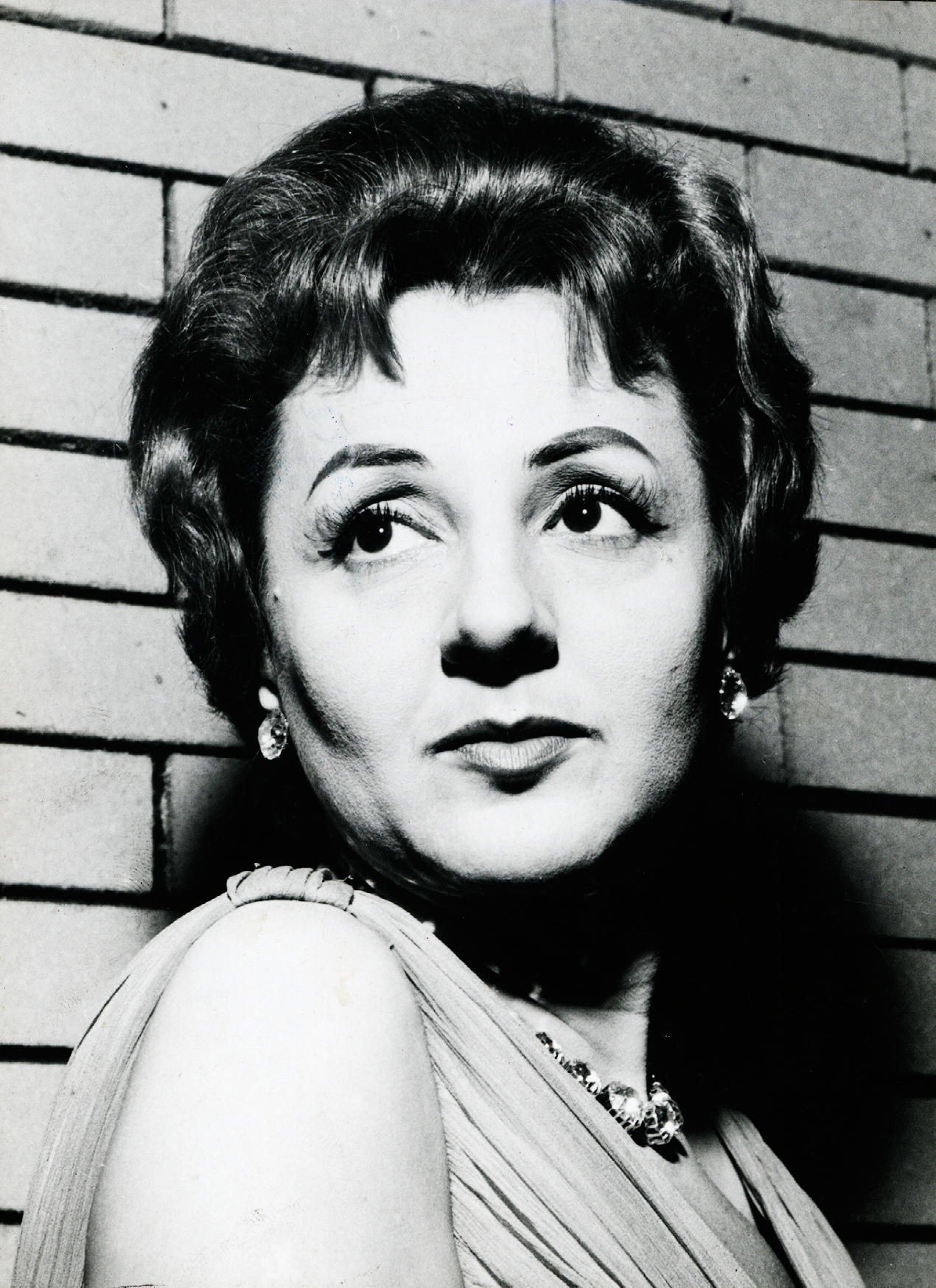
- Todor in 1959
- Born: Fodor Éva; 9 November 1919; Budapest, Hungary
- Died: 10 December 2017 (aged 98); Rio de Janeiro, Brazil
- Occupations: Actress; dancer
- Years active: 1934–2012
- Spouses: Luis Iglesias (m. 1936; died 1958) Paulo Nolding (m. 1964; died 1989)

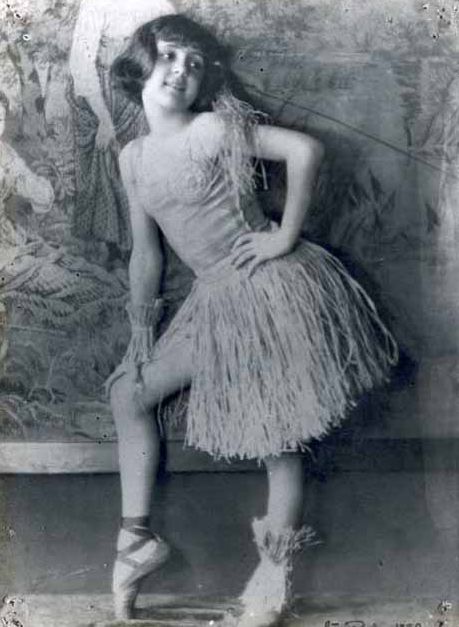
Todor in 1930

Eva Todor Nolding (born Fodor Éva; 9 November 1919 – 10 December 2017) was a Brazilian actress and dancer.

== Biography ==
Eva Fodor was born on 9 November 1919 in Budapest but emigrated with her family to Brazil in 1929. She later changed her surname to Todor. She was married twice – to Luís Iglesias from 1935 until his death in 1963, and to Paulo Nolding from 1964 until his death in 1989. She had no children.

Todor died in Rio de Janeiro on 10 December 2017 of pneumonia while suffering from Alzheimer's and Parkinson's disease, aged 98.

== Filmography ==
Cinema

- 1960: Os Dois Ladrões as Madame Gaby
- 1964: Pão, Amor e... Totobola as Costa's wife
- 2003: Xuxa Abracadabra as Grandma
- 2008: Meu Nome Não É Johnny as Dona Marly

Television

- 1975: Roque Santeiro as Ambrosina Abelha "Dona Pombinha" (unreleased)
- 1977: Locomotivas as Kiki Blanche
- 1984: Partido Alto as Cecília
- 1989: Top Model as Morgana Kundera
- 1992: De Corpo e Alma as Calu (Maria Carolina Pastore)
- 1993: Olho no Olho as Veridiana
- 1998: Hilda Furacão as Loló Ventura
- 2000: O Cravo e a Rosa as Josefa Lacerda de Moura
- 2002: Sítio do Picapau Amarelo as Maria José (Mazé)
- 2005: América as Miss Jane
- 2009: Caminho das Índias as Ms. Cidinha
- 2012: As Brasileiras (Episode: "A Vidente de Diamantina") as Dona Conchita
- 2012-2013: Salve Jorge as Dalia (final appearance)
