= Lima Duarte =

Brazilian actor (born 1930)

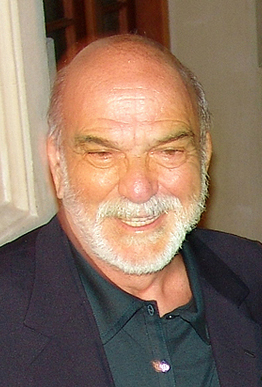
- Duarte in 2006
- Born: Ariclenes Venâncio Martins; 29 March 1930 (age 96); Sacramento, Minas Gerais, Brazil
- Years active: 1949–present
- Spouses: Marisa Sanches (m. 1951; sep. 1961) Martha Godoy de Freitas (m. 1965; sep. 1968) Mara Martins (m. 1970; div. 1989)
- Children: 4 (including Débora)
- Relatives: Paloma Duarte (granddaughter)

Ariclenes Venâncio Martins (born 29 March 1930), known professionally as Lima Duarte (Brazilian Portuguese: [ˈlimɐ ˈdwaʁtʃi]), is a Brazilian actor. He played a number of characters in Brazilian telenovelas, such as Zeca Diabo in O Bem-Amado and Sinhozinho Malta in Roque Santeiro. He first appeared on Brazilian television in 1950. Duarte also worked as a voice actor in the 1960s, being the voice of Top Cat ("Manda-Chuva" in Portuguese), Wally Gator and Dum-Dum (Touche Turtle's friend). He has worked with Brazilian and Portuguese directors, such as Fábio Barreto, Paulo Rocha and Manoel de Oliveira.

== Filmography ==
=== Soap operas ===
- 2022 – Além da Ilusão .... Afonso Camargo
- 2017 – O Outro Lado do Paraíso .... Josafá Tavares
- 2015 – I Love Paraisópolis .... Dom Pepino
- 2010 – Araguaia .... Max Martinez
- 2009 – India – A Love Story .... Shankar
- 2007 – Desejo Proibido .... Mayor Viriato "Condor" Palhares
- 2007 – Amazônia, de Galvez a Chico Mendes .... Bento
- 2005 – Belíssima .... Murat Güney
- 2004 – O Pequeno Alquimista .... Filolal
- 2004 – Senhora do Destino .... Senator Vitório Vianna (special guest)
- 2004 – Da Cor do Pecado .... Alfonso Lambertini
- 2003 – Sítio do Picapau Amarelo .... João Melado
- 2002 – O Quinto dos Infernos .... Conde dos Arcos
- 2002 – Sabor da Paixão .... Miguel Maria Coelho
- 2001 – Porto dos Milagres .... Senator Vitório Vianna
- 2000 – Uga-Uga .... Nikos Karabastos
- 1999 – O Auto da Compadecida .... Bishop
- 1998 – River of Gold
- 1998 – Pecado Capital .... Tonho Alicate (special guest)
- 1998 – Corpo Dourado .... Zé Paulo (special guest)
- 1997 – A Indomada .... Murilo Pontes (special guest)
- 1996 – O Fim do Mundo .... Coronel Ildásio Junqueira
- 1995 – A Próxima Vítima .... Zé Bolacha
- 1993 – Fera Ferida .... Major Emiliano Cerqueira Bentes
- 1993 – Agosto .... Turco Velho
- 1993 – O Mapa da Mina .... delegado (participação)
- 1992 – Pedra sobre Pedra .... Murilo Pontes
- 1990 – Meu Bem, Meu Mal .... Dom Lázaro Venturini
- 1990 – Rainha da Sucata .... Onofre Pereira (special guest)
- 1989 – O Salvador da Pátria .... Sassá Mutema (Salvador da Silva)
- 1985 – Roque Santeiro .... Sinhozinho Malta
- 1985 – O Tempo e o Vento .... major Rafael Pinto Bandeira
- 1984 – Partido Alto .... Cocada (special guest)
- 1982 – Paraíso .... João das Mortes (special guest)
- 1980–1984 – O Bem-amado .... Zeca Diabo (in TV series)
- 1979 – Marron Glacê .... Oscar
- 1979 – Pai Herói .... Malta Cajarana (special guest)
- 1977 – Espelho Mágico .... Carijó
- 1975 – Pecado Capital .... Salviano Lisboa
- 1974 – O Rebu .... Boneco
- 1973 – Os Ossos do Barão .... Egisto Ghirotto
- 1973 – O Bem-Amado .... Zeca Diabo (in telenovela)
- 1971 – A Fábrica .... Pepê
- 1961 – Top Cat .... Top Cat / Spook (voices)
- 1951 – Sua Vida Me Pertence ... Nestor

=== Films ===
- 2013 – A Busca
- 2012 – Colegas
- 2012 – E a Vida Continua...
- 2011 – Assalto ao Banco Central
- 2011 – Família Vende Tudo
- 2005 – 2 Filhos de Francisco
- 2003 – O Preço da Paz
- 2000 – Palavra e Utopia
- 2000 – O Auto da Compadecida
- 2000 – Me You Them (Eu Tu Eles)
- 1998 – Rio de Ouro
- 1997 – Boleiros - Era uma Vez o Futebol...
- 1997 – A Ostra e o Vento
- 1988 – Corpo em Delito
- 1987 – Lua Cheia
- 1983 – Sargento Getúlio
- 1979 – Kilas, o Mau da Fita
- 1979 – O Menino Arco-Íris
- 1977 – O Crime do Zé Bigorna
- 1977 – Os Sete Gatinhos
- 1976 – O Jogo da Vida
- 1976 – Contos Eróticos
- 1976 – A Queda
- 1974 – Guerra Conjugal
- 1968 – Trilogia do Terror
- 1963 – Rei Pelé
- 1958 – Chão Bruto
- 1957 – O Grande Momento
- 1957 – Paixão de Gaúcho
- 1955 – O Sobrado
- 1949 – Quase no Céu
