= Lílian Lemmertz =

Brazilian actress

Lílian Lemmertz Dias (Porto Alegre, June 15, 1937 (Note: According to Flórido & Souza (1999), Lílian was born in 1938.) – Rio de Janeiro, June 5, 1986) was a Brazilian actress.

== Biography ==
Of German descent, Lemmertz graduated as a teacher of Literature in Porto Alegre. Her acting career began when Antonio Abujamra, a course colleague and family friend, convinced her to work in the play The Glass Life, which was being assembled by the University Theatre of the state capital.

She was married to Lineu Dias and is mother of actress Júlia Lemmertz. She died on June 5, 1986, in Rio de Janeiro.
