= Stepan Nercessian =

Brazilian politician

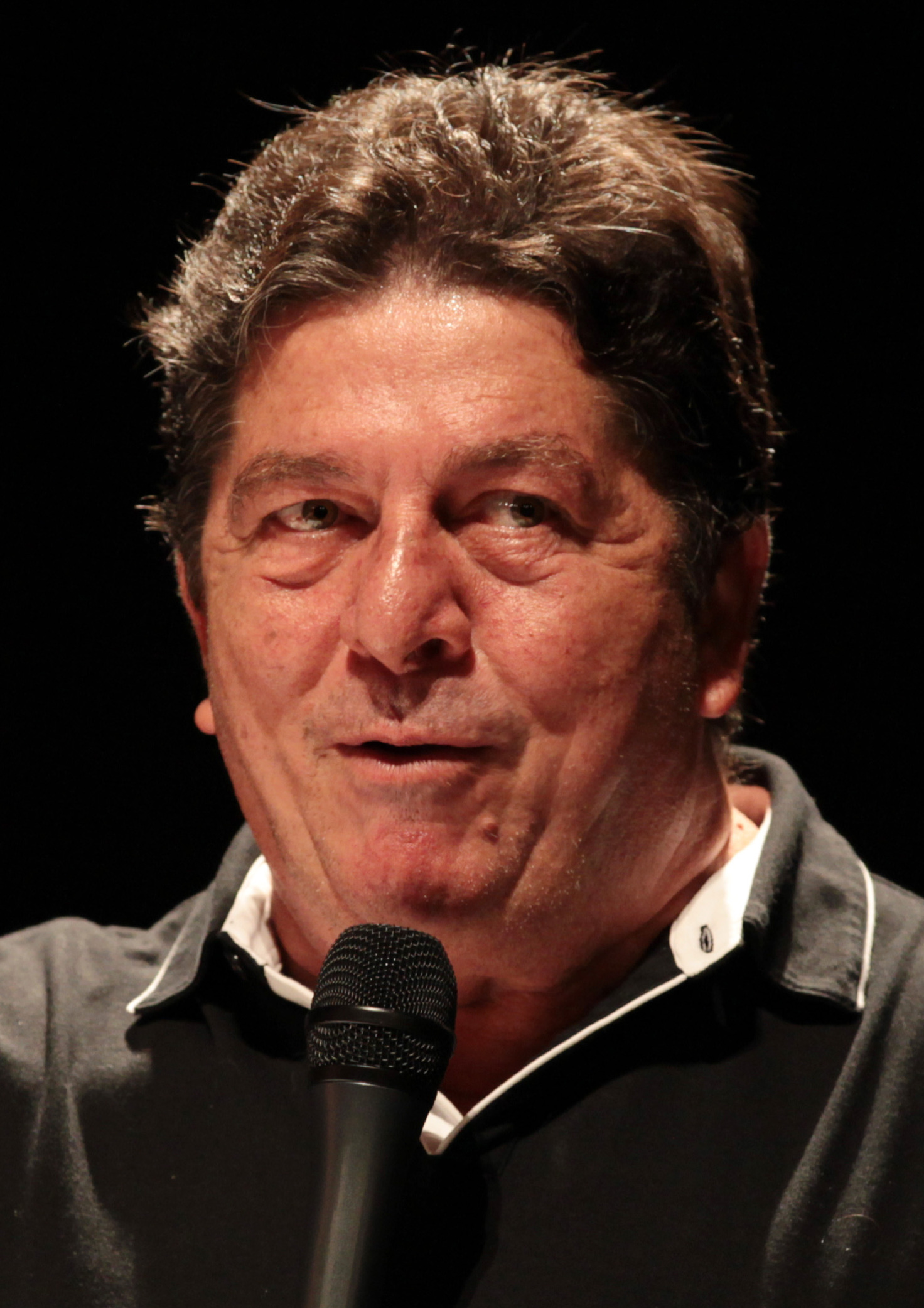
- Nercessian in 2017

Federal Deputy for Rio de Janeiro
- In office 1 February 2011 – 31 January 2015

Councilman of Rio de Janeiro
- In office 1 January 2005 – 31 December 2010

Personal details
- Born: 2 December 1953 (age 72) Cristalina, Goiás, Brazil
- Party: Cidadania (1992–present)
- Spouse: Camilla Amado (m. 1974; div. 1987)
- Occupation: Actor, politician

Stepan Nercessian (born 2 December 1953) is a Brazilian actor and politician of Armenian descent. Nercessian was born in Cristalina, Goiás; his career began in the late 1960s, in the film Marcelo Zona Sul. He also acted on stage and television, having worked for Rede Globo from 1971 to 2018.

== Political career ==
In 2004 Nercessian was elected councilman of the city of Rio de Janeiro, for the Popular Socialist Party; being re-elected in 2008. In the 2010 Brazilian general election, he was elected federal deputy representing the state of Rio de Janeiro with 84,006 votes.

== Selected filmography ==
- 1970 : Marcelo Zona Sul : Marcelo
- 1971 : Pra Quem Fica, Tchau Lui
- 1971 : André, a Cara e a Coragem : André
- 1972 : Revólveres Não Cospem Flores
- 1973 : Amante Muito Louca : Junior
- 1973 : Primeiros Momentos : Tatá
- 1973 : Como É Boa Nossa Empregada: Bebeto
- 1973 : Xica da Silva : José
- 1977 : Lúcio Flávio, o Passageiro da Agonia : the suicidal
- 1999 : Orfeu : Pacheco
- 2003 : God Is Brazilian : Baudelé
- 2014 : Julio Sumiu : Delegado Barriga
- 2014 : Rio, I Love You (Rio, Eu Te Amo) : Porteiro (segment "Dona Fulana")
- 2014: Trash
- 2015 : Bach in Brazil : Director
- 2023: Mussum, o Filmis: Diógenes
