= Heloísa Helena (actress) =

Brazilian actress and singer (1917–1999)

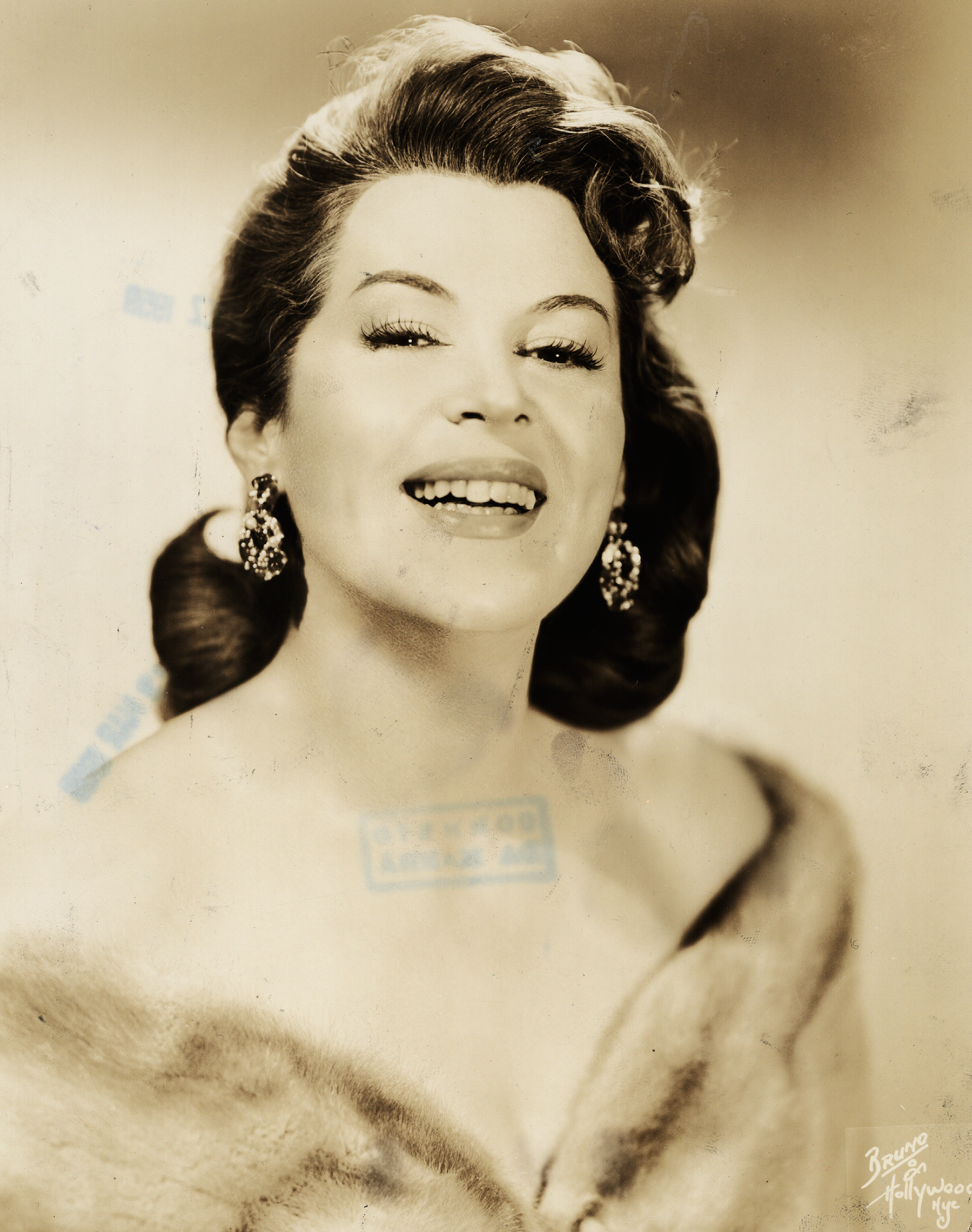
- Heloísa Helena, c. 1960
- Born: October 28, 1917; Rio de Janeiro, Brazil
- Died: June 19, 1999 (aged 81); Rio de Janeiro, Brazil
- Occupation: Actress

Heloísa Helena (28 October 1917 – 19 June 1999) was a Brazilian actress and singer. Her real name was Heloísa Helena Almeida Gama de Magalhães or Heloisa Helena de Almeida Lima. She was born on in Rio de Janeiro, Brazil and died in Ipanema, Rio de Janeiro, Brazil.

In her early career, Heloísa sang in English on the radio, which she spoke with an American accent. The United States embassy made a cultural exchange with Brazil and Heloisa Helena ended up going to New Orleans, staying there for some time.

She appeared in several movies and was the host of the Brazilian What's My Line? television program, called Adivinha o que ele Faz?. She also appeared on the December 16, 1956 episode of the American What's My Line?

== Partial filmography ==
- Alô, Alô, Carnaval (1936)
- Samba da Vida (1937) - Helena
- Tererê Não Resolve (1938)
- Futebol em Família (1939)
- Pega Ladrão (1940)
- Céu Azul (1941) - Mimi
- Luz dos Meus Olhos (1947)
- Terra Violenta (1948) - Lucy
- É com Este Que Eu Vou (1948) - Frou Frou
- É Fogo na Roupa (1952) - Condessa de Buganville
- A Carne É o Diabo (1953)
- O Petróleo é Nosso (1954) - Guimarães's wife
- Marujo Por Acaso (1954)
- Mãos Sangrentas (1955)
- Leonora of the Seven Seas (1955)
- Chico Viola Não Morreu (1955)
- Angu de Caroço (1955)
- Depois Eu Conto (1956) - Marinete
- O Boca de Ouro (1957)
- O Homem do Sputnik (1959) - Dondoca
- Matemática Zero, Amor Dez (1960) - Carolina, Julieta's mother
- Samba em Brasília (1961) - Eugênia
- Rifa-se Uma Mulher (1967)
- Jovens Pra Frente (1968)
- Uma Garota em Maus Lençóis (1970)
- Independência ou Morte (1972) - Carlota Joaquina
- O Descarte (1973)
- Com as Calças na Mão (1975) - D. Flora
- Ódio (1977) - Rosa
- A Pantera Nua (1979) - Verônica
- A Fábrica das Camisinhas (1982)
