= Dias Gomes =

Brazilian playwright (1922–1999)

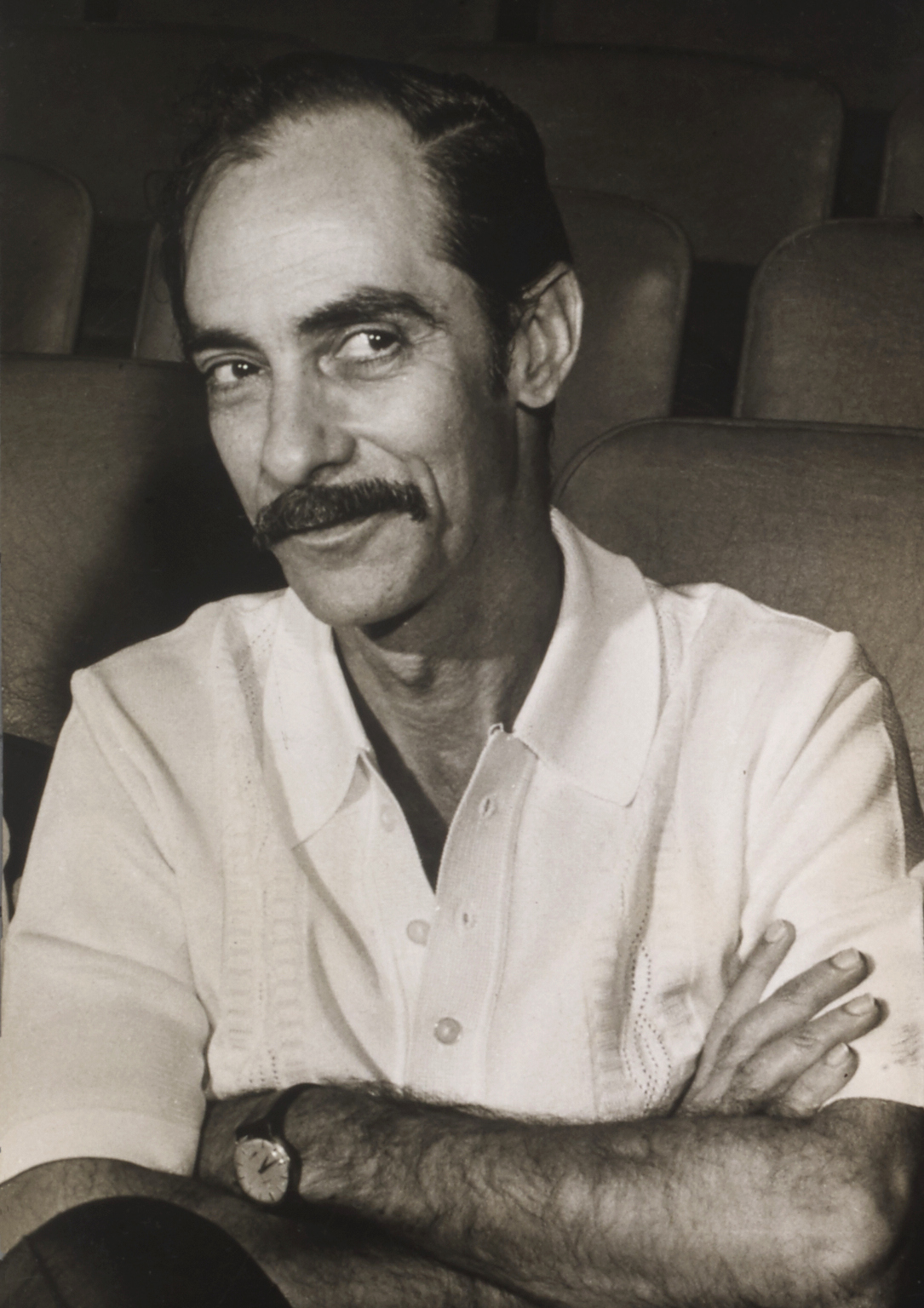
Dias Gomes.

Alfredo de Freitas Dias Gomes (Brazilian Portuguese pronunciation: [ˈdʒiɐz ˈɡomis]; 19 October 1922 – 18 May 1999) was a Brazilian playwright.

He was born on October 19, 1922, in Salvador, Bahia. He started writing plays at age 15 and later wrote soap operas. He wrote the first ever colored soap opera for Brazilian television, and the one with the highest rating of all time. He also wrote numerous Brazilian TV shows, miniseries, and a few movies. Based on his story, the 1962 Brazilian film O Pagador de Promessas (English: Keeper of Promises) was the first ever Brazilian movie to be nominated for an Oscar, and the only South American to ever win the Palme d'Or at the Cannes Film Festival. In 1950 he married Brazilian telenovelist Janete Clair and in their 33 years of marriage they had three children. She died in 1983 and six years later he remarried, to Bernadeth Lyzio. With her he had two daughters, Mayra Dias Gomes, a writer, and Luana Dias Gomes, a student of Economics at Stanford University. He died in a car accident in São Paulo, in 1999.

== Main works ==
- O Pagador de Promessas
- A Revolução dos Beatos
- O Santo Inquérito
- O Bem Amado
- O Rei de Ramos
- Roque Santeiro
- A Ponte dos Suspiros, 1969
- Verão Vermelho
- Assim na Terra como no Céu
- Bandeira 2
- O Espigão
- Saramandaia, 1976
  - based on the original Saramandaia, 2013
- Sinal de Alerta
- Expresso Brasil
- Mandala
- Araponga
- As Noivas de Copacabana
- Irmãos Coragem
- Decadência
- Fim do Mundo
