= Água Viva (TV series) =

- Genre: Telenovela; Romance; Drama
- Created by: Gilberto Braga; Manoel Carlos
- Directed by: Roberto Talma; Paulo Ubiratan
- Starring: Betty Faria; Reginaldo Faria; Raul Cortez; Ângela Leal; Isabela Garcia; Tônia Carrero; Beatriz Segall; Lucélia Santos; Fábio Júnior; Glória Pires; Kadu Moliterno; Maria Padilha; Tetê Medina; José Lewgoy see more
- Opening theme: Menino do Rio by Baby Consuelo
- Ending theme: Menino do Rio by Baby Consuelo
- Country of origin: Brazil
- Original language: Portuguese
- No. of episodes: 159

Production
- Production location: Brazil
- Running time: 50 minutes (approx.)

Original release
- Network: Rede Globo
- Release: 4 February – 8 August 1980

Água Viva (English: Jellyfish) is a Brazilian telenovela produced and broadcast by Rede Globo from 4 February to 8 August 1980, in 160 episodes.

It starred Betty Faria, Reginaldo Faria, Raul Cortez, Tônia Carrero, Lucélia Santos, Fábio Júnior, José Lewgoy, Beatriz Segall, Glória Pires, Kadu Moliterno and Cláudio Cavalcanti.

== Cast ==
Actor/Actress	Character
Betty Faria	Lígia Prates
Reginaldo Faria	Nelson Fragonard
Raul Cortez	Miguel Fragonard
Glória Pires	Sandra Fragonard
Fábio Júnior	Marcos Mesquita
Lucélia Santos	Janete Fragoso
Tônia Carrero	Stella Maria Fraga Simpson
Beatriz Segall	Lourdes Mesquita
Isabela Garcia	Maria Helena Fragonard
Natália do Vale	Márcia Mesquita
Kadu Moliterno	Bruno Fraga Simpson
Cláudio Cavalcanti	Edir da Cunha Santos
Ângela Leal	Suely Bandeira
José Lewgoy	Kléber Fraga Simpson
Tetê Medina	Lucy Fragonard
Mauro Mendonça	Evaldo Fragoso Neves
Eloísa Mafalda	Irene Fragoso Neves
Arlete Salles	Celeste Lima
Carlos Eduardo Dolabella	Heitor Sampaio
Aracy Cardoso	Wilma
Grande Otelo	Canivete
Maria Helena Dias	Clara
John Herbert	Jaime Alves Cardoso
Tamara Taxman	Selma
Jorge Fernando	Jáder Bandeira
Milton Moraes	Sérgio Lima
Fernando Eiras	Alfredo Santana
Maria Padilha	Elisabeth (Beth)
Maria Helena Pader	Mary
Jacqueline Laurence	Clarice
Maria Zilda Bethlem	Gilda Sarpo
Terezinha Sodré	Marinete
Francisco Dantas	Marciano Laranjeira
Clementino Kelé	Tinhorão
Ilva Niño	Antônia
Jardel Mello	Carlos
Ricardo Petraglia	Max
Edson Silva	Lafayette
Lícia Magna	Edith
Ísis Koschdoski	Cíntia
Cleyde Blota	Marlene
Lucy Mafra	Rosa
Nildo Parente	Fonseca
Ivan Cândido	Técio
Dary Reis	Joel
Ricardo Blat	Jofre
Álvaro Aguiar	Turíbio
Danton Jardim	Edson
Ênio Santos	Delegate Rômulo Siqueira
Hemílcio Fróes	Armando
Henriette Morineau	Jojô Besançon
Ivan Mesquita	Detective Milton
José Carlos Sanches	Lúcio
Tony Ferreira	Valdir
Waldyr Sant'anna	Newsman
Luiz Armando Queiroz	Gaff

=== Supporting cast ===
- Maria Eugênia Villarta - Cristina
- Orion Ximenes - Valtinho
- Ticiana Studart - Lia
- Izabella Bicalho - Francisquinha (orphan)
- João Cláudio Melo - Paulo Roberto
- Giovana Souto Maior - Patrícia

== Production ==
It had the provisional title Vento Norte.

Gilberto Braga complained about having to write the telenovela alone, and TV Globo called Manoel Carlos to collaborate on the plot from episode 60 onward.

Actresses Tônia Carrero, Glória Pires, Maria Zilda and Maria Padilha were scheduled to film a scene at Posto 9 of Ipanema Beach, in the South Zone of Rio de Janeiro. They would simulate topless sunbathing, wearing only adhesive patches to cover their breasts. Some bystanders protested and even attacked the production crew. According to Maria Padilha: "When onlookers realized we would go topless, they drove us off the beach by throwing cans and sand." The scene ultimately had to be filmed at São Conrado Beach.

Gilberto Braga was inspired by the American musical Annie, about the story of a charming orphan girl—in the telenovela, Maria Helena, played by Isabela Garcia, who was thirteen years old.

In the past, Kleber had been the tutor of the brothers Nelson (Reginaldo Faria) and Miguel Fragonard. Miguel discovered that Kleber, who managed Nelson's assets, was responsible for his financial ruin. Kleber eventually ended his days in prison, writing his memoirs.

It was the first work of costume designer Helena Gastal at TV Globo. It was also the first telenovela at the network for actors John Herbert and Raul Cortez, as well as the debut in telenovelas of Carla Marins and Marcelo Faria.

== Ratings ==
During its original broadcast, the telenovela achieved an overall average of 58 points in the IBOPE ratings, being considered one of the most-watched 8 p.m. telenovelas in the history of TV Globo. Its highest rating was 75 points for the final episode on 8 August 1980, while its lowest was 50 points, recorded on 23 February 1980.

== Broadcast ==
It was rerun on Vale a Pena Ver de Novo from 13 February to 31 August 1984, replacing Pecado Rasgado and later being replaced by Final Feliz, in 145 episodes. It was the first 8 p.m. telenovela to be rerun in the afternoon slot, breaking the tradition that only 6 p.m. or 7 p.m. telenovelas were rebroadcast in that time slot. Its rerun was approved at the last minute, as in January 1984 TV Globo had already aired promos announcing the return of Elas por Elas.

The series was rerun in full on Viva from 30 September 2013 to 5 April 2014, replacing Rainha da Sucata and later replaced by Dancin' Days. The rerun was chosen by viewers through a poll on the channel's website. Competing with Fera Ferida, O Dono do Mundo and A Indomada, the telenovela won the poll with 41.7% of the votes.

It was rerun again in full on Viva Fast, the free ad-supported streaming television version of the subscription channel, between 9 September 2024 and 18 April 2025, replacing Fera Radical. It was also the last telenovela shown on Viva 80 Fast. On 16 December 2024 the process of merging the channel with Viva 70 Fast began, concluding on 26 December, with the series continuing in the schedule under the unified name Viva Fast, which would later cease operations after the broadcast of its final episode due to low demand.

=== Home media ===
In June 2015, the telenovela was released on DVD by Globo Marcas.

On 17 June 2024, it was made available in full on Globoplay as part of the Projeto Resgate.

== Soundtrack ==
Água Viva also had both national and international soundtracks. Several songs became associated with the telenovela and its characters, including "Realce" by Gilberto Gil, "Amor, Meu Grande Amor" by Angela Ro Ro, "20 e Poucos Anos" by Fábio Jr., "Altos e Baixos" by Elis Regina, "Grito de Alerta" performed by Maria Bethânia, "Cais" by Milton Nascimento, "Wave" performed by João Gilberto, "Love I Need" by Jimmy Cliff, "Cruisin'" by Smokey Robinson, "Ships" by Barry Manilow, and "Babe" by Styx, among others.
