= Glória Pires =

Brazilian actress (born 1963)

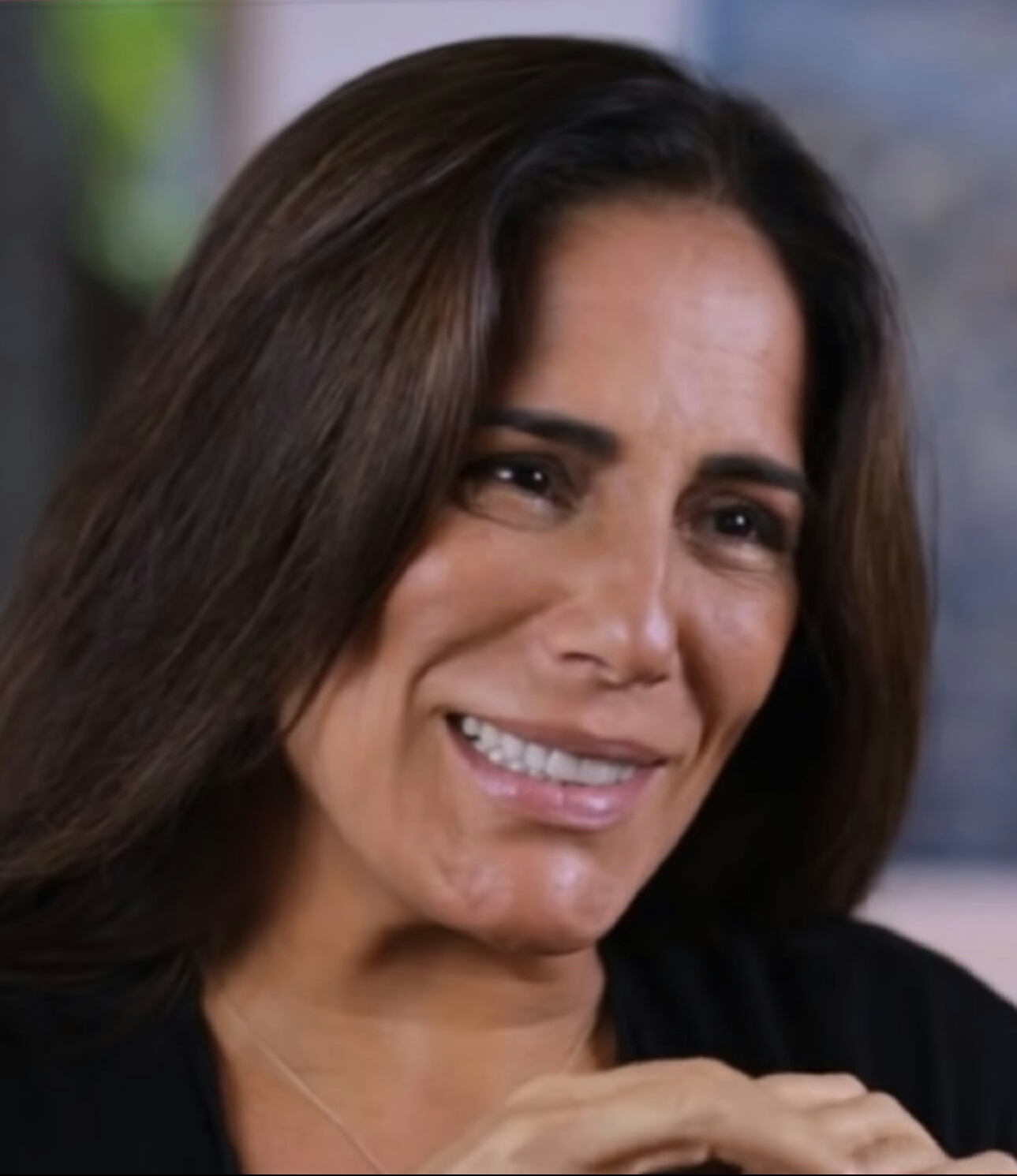
- Pires in 2019
- Born: Glória Maria Cláudia Pires; 23 August 1963 (age 62); Rio de Janeiro, Brazil
- Citizenship: Brazil; Portugal
- Occupation: Actress
- Years active: 1968–present
- Spouses: Fábio Júnior (m. 1979; div. 1983) Orlando Morais (m. 1987)
- Children: 4, including Cleo
- Website: gloriapires.com.br

Glória Maria Cláudia Pires de Morais (Brazilian Portuguese pronunciation: [ˈɡlɔɾjɐ mɐˈɾi.ɐ ˈklawdʒɐ ˈpiɾiz dʒi moˈɾajs]; née Pires; born 23 August 1963) is a Brazilian actress. She is best known for her roles in TV Globo telenovelas such as Dancin' Days, Vale Tudo, Mulheres de Areia and O Rei do Gado. She is also known for starring in films such as Academy Award-nominated O Quatrilho, box-office hit If I Were You and its sequel, and Lula, Son of Brazil, which is the second most expensive Brazilian film of all time, after Nosso Lar.

In 2013, she was honoured by Forbes Brazil as one of Brazil's most influential persons, being ranked in the 28th position out of the 30 short-listed.

== Early life ==
Pires was born on 23 August 1963 in Rio de Janeiro. She is the daughter of producer Elza Pires and actor Antônio Carlos Pires. She has a sister named Linda Pires, a therapist. She is of Native Brazilian and Portuguese descent.

== Career ==
=== 1960s and 1970s ===
Glória made her debut as an actress at the age of 5, on the telenovela A Pequena Órfã, broadcast on the now-defunct TV Excelsior. She initially participated only in the show's opening sequence, but director Dionísio Azevedo would later cast her to play a minor character. On her first day of shooting, however, she experienced a nasal hemorrhage and was removed from the telenovela. Later, when the lead actress Patrícia Ayres dropped out due to contractual reasons, Glória was given the chance to dub Ayres' voice.

In 1971, Glória did a screen test for the role of Zizi in the Globo telenovela O Primeiro Amor, but was rejected. In 1972 she made her debut in the network's Caso Especial episode "Sombra de Suspeita". That same year she made her telenovela debut starring in a minor role in Janete Clair's Selva de Pedra. In 1973 Glória landed a tiny role in Clair's O Semideus. She also acted alongside her father and Chico Anysio on the comedy program Chico City, broadcast on Rede Globo. She went on to act in several other comedy programs. In 1976, Glória starred in Clair's Duas Vidas, where she learned a lot from senior actor Luiz Gustavo, who played her father in the series. In 1977, disappointed with the roles offered to her, she decided to take a break from acting.

In 1978, Glória learned from her father that director Daniel Filho was searching for an actress to play Sônia Braga's teenager daughter in his telenovela Dancin' Days. After much deliberation, she decided to take the screen test for the role. The telenovela was a big hit and Glória won the Best Newcomer Award from the São Paulo Association of Art Critics. During the telenovela's original broadcast, she faced censorship from the Juvenile Court, which prohibited her from giving interviews based on her controversial opinions about the school system. In June 1979 Glória landed the lead role in Cabocla opposite her husband Fábio Jr. She was unable to shoot the final scenes of the telenovela due to a severe stress crisis that kept her hospitalized for two weeks.

=== 1980s ===
In 1980, after she left the hospital, Glória decided to change her appearance, cutting and lightening her hair. Her next telenovelas were Água Viva and As Três Marias, an adaptation of Clarice Lispector's novel of the same name. She made a deal with Globo so that she could act in her first feature film after the end of this telenovela. In 1981, Glória starred in Fábio Barreto's Índia, a filha do Sol as Putkoy, a Native Brazilian who falls in love with a white soldier played by Nuno Leal Maia. This was also Barreto's first feature film.

In 1982, Glória took a break from acting due to her first pregnancy. In 1983 she returned to telenovelas with Louco Amor as newly graduated journalist Cláudia. During this telenovela, Nelson Pereira dos Santos invited her to play Heloísa, Graciliano Ramos' wife, in his film Memoirs of Prison. This was her second collaboration with Fábio Barreto, who starred as Siqueira Campos. Glória attended the film's premiere alongside real life Heloísa. In 1984, she acted in the telenovela Partido Alto. The following year marked Globo's 20th anniversary, and the mini-series O Tempo e o Vento, an adaptation of Érico Veríssimo's novel of same name, was produced to celebrate it. After she learned that Paulo José, the director of the mini-series, wanted to cast her as the main lead, Ana Terra, Glória convinced Globo's head director Daniel Filho that she could reconcile the shooting of the telenovela and the mini-series.

After O Tempo e o Vento, Glória starred in her second film, Francisco Ramalho Júnior's Besame Mucho, alongside Antônio Fagundes and José Wilker. She moved to São Paulo for two months with daughter Cléo Pires in order to shoot the film. In 1987 she starred in the telenovela Direito de Amar and in the film The Long Haul. In 1988, she postponed her honeymoon with second husband Orlando Morais in order to play Maria de Fátima, Regina Duarte's daughter and antagonist, in Vale Tudo.

=== 1990s and 2000s ===
In 1990, Glória starred in Mico Preto, followed by O Dono do Mundo. In 1993, after the birth of her second daughter, Glória starred in Mulheres de Areia playing twin sisters. She received the Troféu Imprensa Award for Best Actress for her performance. In 1994 she starred in the mini-series Memorial de Maria Moura, adapted from the Raquel de Queiroz' novel of the same name. It won Glória another award from the São Paulo Association of Art Critics and was shown in various international markets under the international title Merciless Land. In 1995 she starred in O Quatrilho, her third collaboration with Fábio Barreto. Glória received several best actress awards and the film was nominated for the Academy Award for Best Foreign Language Film.

In 1996, Glória starred in O Rei do Gado with Patrícia Pillar, her co-star in O Quatrilho. In 1997 she starred as the main lead in Anjo Mau. It was one of the highest-rating telenovelas ever in the 6 p.m. timeslot. The following year, Glória moved to Los Angeles with her family to seek privacy. After living a whole year in California, Glória starred in Suave Veneno.

In 2000, Glória gave birth to her third daughter. The following year she starred in the film adaptation of A Partilha, a play by Miguel Falabella. Just like the play, the film was also a critical and commercial success. In 2002, Glória starred in Desejos de Mulher, one of the lowest-rating telenovelas in the history of Globo. The following year, she moved with her family to Goiás, the native state of her husband, living among a ranch and an apartment. In 2004, she gave birth to Bento, her fourth child and first son.

In 2005, Glória's father died of complications of Parkinson's disease. That same year she filmed Daniel Filho's If I Were You alongside Tony Ramos. It became one of the highest-grossing Brazilian films since the Retomada, selling more than 4 million tickets. After the flop of Desejos de Mulher, she returned to telenovelas with the 2005 hit Belíssima, alongside Fernanda Montenegro.

In 2007 she starred in the Daniel Filho-directed Primo Basílio, an adaptation of the José Maria de Eça de Queiroz novel Cousin Bazilio. The following year she starred opposite Tony Ramos in Paraíso Tropical. In early 2008, once again seeking privacy, she moved to Paris with her family. In 2009 she released Se Eu Fosse Você 2, which became the highest-grossing Brazilian film of the decade, and starred in Lula, Son of Brazil, a biopic about President Luiz Inácio Lula da Silva, marking her fourth collaboration with Fábio Barreto and the first with her daughter Cléo. She also starred in É Proibido Fumar.

=== 2010s ===
Glória announced that she would release her biography before returning to Paris on 8 March 2010. The book 40 Anos de Glória, written by Eduardo Nassife and Fábio Fabrício Fabretti, marked 40 years of her career.

In 2013, she starred in the movie Reaching for the Moon alongside Miranda Otto. That year she was also honoured by Forbes Brazil as one of Brazil's most influential persons, being ranked in the 28th position out of the 30 short-listed.

== Personal life ==
In the 1970s, Glória dated Chico Anysio's son Nizo Neto.

From 1979 to 1983 she was married to singer and actor Fábio Jr, father of her oldest daughter, Cléo Pires (born 2 October 1982), also an actress. She has been married to singer Orlando Morais since April 1988, with whom she had Antônia Morais (born 7 August 1992), Ana (born 10 July 2000), and Bento (born 4 October 2004).

== Filmography ==
=== Film ===
Year	Film	Role
1973	Robin Hood	Sis (Dubbing, Brazilian version only)
1981	Índia, a Filha do Sol	Put'Koi
1984	Memoirs of Prison	Heloísa Ramos
1987	Besame Mucho	Olga
1988	The Long Haul	Sandra
1995	O Quatrilho	Pierina
1996	O Guarani	Isabel
1997	Pequeno Dicionário Amoroso	Bel
2001	A Partilha	Selma
2006	If I Were You	Helena / Cláudio
2007	Primo Basílio	Juliana
2008	Se Eu Fosse Você 2	Helena / Cláudio
2009	É Proibido Fumar	Baby
2010	Lula, Son of Brazil	Dona Lindu
2013	Reaching for the Moon	Lota de Macedo Soares
2014	Irmã Dulce	Dona Dulce Maria
2015	Linda de Morrer	Dr. Paula
2015	Pequeno Dicionário Amoroso 2	Bel
2016	Nise: The Heart of Madness	Nise da Silveira
2021	Mise en Scène: a Artesania do Artista	Narrator
2022	A Suspeita	Lúcia Carvalho
2023	Desapega!	Rita
2024	Vovó Ninja	Vovó
2025	Sexa	Bárbara
2026	If I Were You 3	Helena

=== Television ===
Year	Title	Role
1968	A Pequena Órfã	Glorinha
1972	Caso Especial	Ângela
1972–1973	Selva de Pedra	Fátima "Fatinha"
1972	Chico em Quadrinhos	Glorinha
1973–1980	Chico City	Various characters
1973–1974	O Semideus	Ione
1976–1977	Duas Vidas	Letícia
1978–1979	Dancin' Days	Marisa de Sousa Matos
1979	Cabocla	Zulmira de Oliveira "Zuca"
1980	Água Viva	Sandra Fragonard
1980–1981	As Três Marias	Maria José "Jô"
1983	Louco Amor	Cláudia
1984	Partido Alto	Celina
1985	O Tempo e o Vento	Ana Terra
1987	Direito de Amar	Rosália Alves Medeiros
1988—1989	Vale Tudo	Maria de Fátima Aciolli
1990	Mico Preto	Sarita
1991–1992	O Dono do Mundo	Stella Maciel Barreto
1993	Mulheres de Areia	Ruth Araújo Assunção / Raquel Araújo Assunção
1994	Memorial de Maria Moura	Maria Moura
1996–1997	O Rei do Gado	Rafaela Berdinazzi / Marieta Berdinazzi
1997–1998	Anjo Mau	Nice Noronha
1999	Suave Veneno	Maria Inês / Lavínia de Alencar Cerqueira
2002	Desejos de Mulher	Júlia Moreno
2005–2006	Belíssima	Júlia Assunpção
2006	Casseta & Planeta, Urgente!	Various characters
2007	Paraíso Tropical	Lúcia Vilela Cavalcanti
2011	Insensato Coração	Norma Pimentel Amaral
2012	As Brasileiras (Episode : "A Mamãe da Barra")	Ângela Cristina
2012–2013	Guerra dos Sexos	Roberta Carneiro Leone
2014	A Grande Família	Herself / Nenê (Special appearance in the last episode)
2015	Babilônia	Beatriz Amaral Rangel
2016	Oscar	Comentarist
2016–2017	Segredos de Justiça	Andréa Pachá
2017–2018	O Outro Lado do Paraíso	Elizabeth Mello de Monserrat "Beth" / Maria Eduarda Feijó "Duda"
2019	Mulheres Fantásticas	Narrator
2019	As Vilãs que Amamos	Herself
2019–2020	Éramos Seis	Eleonora Abílio de Lemos "Dona Lola"
2022	Além da Ilusão	Nise da Silveira
2023–2024	Terra e Paixão	Irene La Selva

== Awards and nominations ==
Over the 40 years of her professional career, Glória Pires has won numerous awards. In 1979 she won the São Paulo Association of Art Critics Award (Portuguese: Associação Paulista dos Críticos de Arte - APCA) for Most Promising Television Actress for Dancin' Days. In 1989, 1992, and 1994, she won the APCA trophy for Best Television Actress for Vale Tudo, O Dono do Mundo, and Mulheres de Areia, respectively. In 1995 Glória won the Havana Film Festival Best Actress Award for her performance in O Quatrilho. In 1996 she received the APCA trophy for Best Film Actress for O Quatrilho, a feat she would repeat in 2010 with É Proibido Fumar. In 2009 Glória won the Festival de Brasília Best Actress Award for her performance in É Proibido Fumar.

Year	Award	Nominated work	Category	Result
1978	Troféu APCA	Dancin' Days - Marisa De Souza Mattos	Best Female Revelation	Won
1981	Troféu Imprensa	As Três Marias - Maria José	Revelation of the Yeae	Won
1988	Troféu APCA	Vale Tudo - Maria de Fátima Alcioli Roitmam	Best Actress	Nominated
1991	Troféu APCA	O Dono do Mundo - Stella Maciel Barreto	Best Actress	Won
1993	Troféu APCA	Mulheres de Areia - Ruth/Raquel Araújo	Best Actress	Won
1993	Troféu Imprensa	Mulheres de Areia - Ruth/Raquel Araújo	Best Actress	Won
1995	Festival de Cinema de Havana	O Quatrilho - Pierina	Best Actress	Nominated
1995	Festival de Cinema de Viña del Mar	O Quatrilho - Pierina	Best Actress	Nominated
1995	Troféu APCA	O Quatrilho - Pierina	Best Actress	Nominated
1996	Prêmio Contigo	O Rei do Gado - Rafaela/Marieta	Best Villain	Nominated
2007	Prêmio Contigo	If I Were You - Cláudio/Helena	Best Actress	Nominated
2007	Melhores do Ano - Domingão do Faustão	Conjunto da obra	Trófeu Mário Lago	Won
2007	Personalidade do Ano - IstoÉ Gente	Paraíso Tropical - Lúcia Vilela		Won
2008	Prêmio Contigo	Primo Basílio - Juliana	Best Supporting Actress	Nominated
2009	Festival de Brasília	É Proibido Fumar - Baby	Best Actress	Nominated
2009	Troféu APCA	É Proibido Fumar - Baby	Best Actress	Nominated
2010	Cine SESC	É Proibido Fumar - Baby	Best Actress	Nominated
2011	Grande Prêmio Brasileiro de Cinema 2011	Lula, o Filho do Brasil - Dona Lindu	Best Actress	Won
2011	Prêmio Extra de TV	Insensato Coração - Norma Pimentel	Best Actress	Nominated
2011	Troféu APCA	Insensato Coração - Norma Pimentel	Best Television Actress	Won
2015	Troféu AIB de Imprensa	Babilônia - Beatriz Souza Rangel	Best Television Actress	Nominated
2015	Prêmio Extra de Televisão	Babilônia - Beatriz Souza Rangel	Best Television Actress	Pending
2015	Premio TV Brasil	Babilônia - Beatriz Souza Rangel	Best Television Actress	Won
2015	Tokyo International Film Festival	Nise: The Heart of Madness	Best Actress	Won
