= If I Were You (2006 film) =

2006 film by Daniel Filho

- Portuguese: Se Eu Fosse Você
- Directed by: Daniel Filho
- Starring: Glória Pires; Tony Ramos; Lavínia Vlasak; Thiago Lacerda; Glória Menezes; Danielle Winits; Patrícia Pillar
- Cinematography: José Roberto Eliezer
- Edited by: Felipe Lacerda
- Production company: Total Entertainment
- Distributed by: Fox Film do Brasil
- Release date: 6 January 2006
- Running time: 108 minutes
- Country: Brazil
- Language: Portuguese
- Budget: R$ 5 million
- Box office: $12.316.942

If I Were You (Portuguese: Se Eu Fosse Você) is a 2006 Brazilian comedy film directed by Daniel Filho.

The film was a box office success, having the largest audience of a Brazilian film in 2006. It was followed by the sequel Se Eu Fosse Você 2 (2009) and Se Eu Fosse Você 3 (2026).

== Plot ==
The film follows the story of Cláudio, a successful publicist who owns his own agency, and Helena, his wife, a music teacher who takes care of a children's choir. Accustomed to the day-by-day marriage routine, they occasionally argue. One day they have a bigger fight than normal, which causes something inexplicable to happen: they switch bodies. Terrified, Claudio and Helena try to appear normal until they can reverse the situation. But to do so they will have to fully assume each other's lives.

== Cast ==
- Glória Pires as Helena / Claudio
- Tony Ramos as Cláudio / Helena
- Lavínia Vlasak as Bárbara
- Thiago Lacerda as Marcos
- Glória Menezes as Vivinha
- Lara Rodrigues as Bia
- Danielle Winits as Cibelle
- Patrícia Pillar as Dr. Cris
- Maria Gladys as Cida
- Ary Fontoura as Priest
- Helena Fernandes as Débora
- Maria Ceiça as Márcia
- Leandro Hassum as Maurício
- Dennis Carvalho as Arnaldo

== Soundtrack ==
Se Eu Fosse Você (Soundtrack)

Soundtrack album by Various Artists
- Released: 2006

No.	Title	Music	Length
1.	"Mulheres Gostam"	Marina Elali
2.	"Chapa Quente"	Pérola Black
3.	"So Deep"	House Brothers
4.	"Dance With Me"	Lulu Joppert
5.	"Runaway People"	Lucas Babin
6.	"Hipnotizar Você"	Marina Elali
7.	"Slow Motion Bossa Nova"	Celso Fonseca
8.	"Here´s Your Chance"	Alma Thomas
9.	"How Gee"	Black Machine
10.	"9ª Sinfonia de Beethoven (Ode à Alegria) Versão Hip Hop"	Jovens Princesas de Petrópolis
11.	"9ª Sinfonia de Beethoven (Ode à Alegria) Maxpop Remix"	Jovens Princesas de Petrópolis
