= Beatriz Segall =

Brazilian actress (1926–2018)

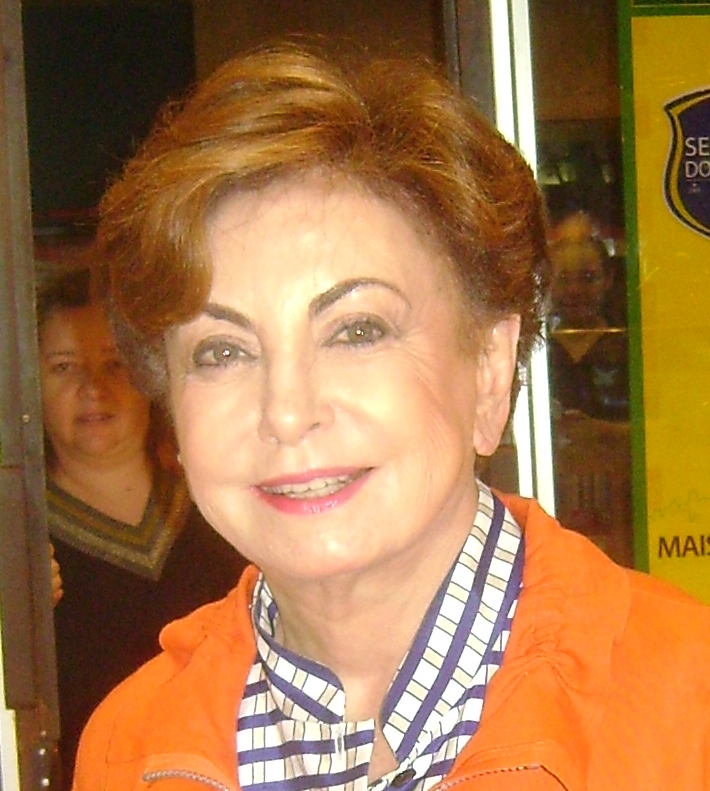
- Segall in 2011
- Born: Beatriz de Toledo; 25 July 1926; Rio de Janeiro, Brazil
- Died: 5 September 2018 (aged 92); São Paulo, Brazil
- Occupation: Actress
- Years active: 1941–2016
- Spouse: Maurício Klabin Segall
- Children: Sérgio Segall | Paulo Segall | Mário Lasar Segall

Beatriz Segall (25 July 1926 – 5 September 2018) was a Brazilian actress. One of her most notable works is the role of Odete Roitman on the telenovela Vale Tudo (1988), considered the greatest villain in the history of Brazilian television.

In 1954, she married Maurício Klabin Segall (son of the Lithuanian Jewish painter Lasar Segall and translator Jenny Klabin, and grandson of Maurício Freeman Klabin, founder of Klabin, one of the world’s largest paper and pulp companies), with whom she had three children: film director and businessman Sérgio Segall, professor Mário Lasar Segall, and the architect Paulo Segall.

== Partial filmography ==
- 24 Horas de Sonho (1941) as Glória Seydoux Gayet
- Pássaros de Asas Cortadas (1942)
- Fantasma Por Acaso (1946) as Libânia
- A Beleza do Diabo (1950)
- Cleo e Daniel (1970) as Cléo's Mother
- À Flor da Pele (1977) as Isaura
- Dancin' Days (1978, TV Series) as Celina
- O Cortiço (1978) as D. Isabel
- Diário da Província (1978)
- Pai Herói (1979, TV Series) as Norah Limeira
- Os Amantes da Chuva (1979)
- Água Viva (1980, TV Series) as Lurdes Mesquita
- Pixote (1981) as Widower
- Sol de Verão (1982, TV Series) as Laura
- Louco Amor (1983, TV Series) as Lourdes Mesquita
- Champagne (1983, TV Series) as Eunice
- Romance (1988) as Cecília
- Vale Tudo (1988-1989, TV Series) as Odete Roitman
- Barriga de Aluguel (1990, TV Series) as Miss Penelope Brown
- Sonho Meu (1993-1994, TV Series) as Paula Candeias de Sá
- Anjo Mau (1997, TV Series) as Clotilde 'Clô' Jordão
- Esperança (2002, TV Series) as Antônia
- Desmundo (2002) as Dona Brites
- Família Vende Tudo (2011) as Vivi Penteado
- Lado a Lado (2012, TV Series) as Madame Besançon
- Os Experientes (2015, TV Mini-Series) as Yolanda
