= Louco Amor (Brazilian TV series) =

- Genre: Telenovela
- Created by: Gilberto Braga
- Directed by: Wolf Maya
- Starring: Bruna Lombardi; Fábio Júnior; Glória Pires; Reginaldo Faria; Tereza Rachel; Bia Seidl; Antônio Fagundes; Christiane Torloni; Nicette Bruno; José Lewgoy; Tônia Carrero; Arlete Salles; Carlos Alberto Riccelli
- Opening theme: "Nosso Louco Amor" by Gang 90 and As Absurdettes
- Country of origin: Brazil
- Original language: Portuguese
- No. of episodes: 167

Production
- Running time: 50 minutes

Original release
- Network: TV Globo
- Release: 11 April – 21 October 1983

Related
- Sol de Verão; Champagne; Entre el amor y el deseo

Louco Amor is a Brazilian telenovela produced and broadcast by TV Globo. It premiered on 11 April 1983 and ended on 21 October 1983, with a total of 167 episodes. It was the thirtieth "novela das oito" to be aired on the timeslot. It is created and written by Gilberto Braga and directed by Wolf Maya.

== Cast ==
Actor	Character
Bruna Lombardi	Patrícia Dumont
Fábio Junior	Luís Carlos Becker
Glória Pires	Cláudia Becker
Tereza Rachel	Renata Dumont (Agetilde Rocha)
Mário Lago	Agenor Rocha
Tônia Carrero	Muriel
Reginaldo Faria	Guilherme
Christiane Torloni	Lúcia
Carlos Eduardo Dolabella	Fernando Lins
Nicette Bruno	Isolda Becker
Mauro Mendonça	Embaixador André Dumont
Arlete Salles	Isadora
Fernando Torres	Alfredo
Antonio Fagundes	Jorge Augusto
Carlos Alberto Riccelli	Márcio
Beth Goulart	Carla
Lauro Corona	Lipe (Felipe Dumont)
José Lewgoy	Edgar Dumont
Lady Francisco	Gisela Dumont
Otávio Augusto	Rodolfo
Rosane Gofman	Estela (Estelinha)
Bia Seidl	Luciana
Milton Moraes	Sérgio
Rosita Thomaz Lopes	Fernanda (Nanda)
Maurício do Valle	Rubens
Yolanda Cardoso	Alda Maria
Roberto de Cleto	Tomás Lins
Lourdes Mayer	Raquel
Buza Ferraz	Victor
Chica Xavier	Denise
Clementino Kelé	Gonçalo
Thelma Reston	Berta
Hemílcio Fróes	Dr. Mário Noronha
Márcia Rodrigues	Nilda
Paulo Pinheiro	Dr. Cardoso
Desireé Vignolli	Maria Luíza
