= Vale Tudo (TV series) =

- Created by: Gilberto Braga; Aguinaldo Silva; Leonor Bassères
- Directed by: Dennis Carvalho; Ricardo Waddington
- Starring: Regina Duarte; Antônio Fagundes; Glória Pires; Carlos Alberto Riccelli; Beatriz Segall; Renata Sorrah; Reginaldo Faria; Cássia Kis; Nathália Timberg; Cássio Gabus Mendes; Lídia Brondi; Lília Cabral; Pedro Paulo Rangel; Cláudio Corrêa e Castro; Íris Bruzzi see more
- Opening theme: "Brasil" by Gal Costa
- Composers: Nilo Romero; George Israel; Cazuza
- Country of origin: Brazil
- Original language: Portuguese
- No. of episodes: 204

Production
- Running time: 50 minutes
- Production company: Central Globo de Produção

Original release
- Network: Rede Globo
- Release: 16 May 1988 – 6 January 1989

Related
- Vale Tudo (2025 TV series); Vale todo (2002)

Vale Tudo (English: Anything Goes) is a Brazilian telenovela produced and broadcast by Rede Globo from May 16, 1988, to January 6, 1989.

In 2016 Vale Tudo and Avenida Brasil were elected by the magazine Veja as "the best Brazilian telenovelas of all time".

== Plot ==
Young Maria de Fátima does not believe in honesty. Without hesitation, she sells the family home, leaving her mother destitute, and moves to Rio de Janeiro with the intention of earning a living as a model or with a wealthy marriage. She gets involved with the scoundrel César Ribeiro, a model at the end of his career, and, to achieve her goals, uses the most sordid means. She meets the millionaire Afonso Roitman and, after many schemes, separates him from his girlfriend, Solange, to marry him.

Raquel, Fátima's mother, is her opposite: the personification of honesty. For her, only work can give dignity to a man. When she was abandoned by her husband with a daughter to raise, she did not hesitate to face the day to day. After being deceived by her daughter, Raquel goes after her and settles in Rio. She meets Ivan, the man she falls in love with, and, after much struggle, from selling sandwiches on the beach, she becomes the owner of a restaurant chain, Paladar.

The story takes a turn when Raquel finds a suitcase with US$800,000, lost by the dishonest executive Marco Aurélio, and refuses to keep the money, as Ivan suggested. The suitcase disappears due to a plan by Fátima and Raquel believes that it was Ivan who took it. The two end up breaking up and Ivan marries Heleninha, a fragile and alcoholic artist, daughter of the all-powerful Odete Roitman, owner of the TCA airline company, who is most to blame for her daughter's psychological problems.

Odete is having an affair with César, Fátima's lover – who, at this point, has become her daughter-in-law when she marries her son Afonso. Odete is a rich and arrogant woman, capable of anything to defend her interests. She ends up being murdered while arguing with Marco Aurélio, an executive at her company, when she discovers that he was the owner of the suitcase with dollars and that he had embezzled a fortune from her assets. While Marco Aurélio flees with the money, the police are on the trail of Odete Roitman's killer. And Fátima and César plan a new scam, outside the country.

== Cast ==
Actor/Actress	Character
Regina Duarte	Raquel Accioli
Glória Pires	Maria de Fátima Accioli
Beatriz Segall	Odete de Almeida Roitman
Antônio Fagundes	Ivan Meireles
Renata Sorrah	Helena "Heleninha" de Almeida Roitman
Reginaldo Faria	Marco Aurélio Cantanhede
Lídia Brondi	Solange Duprat
Carlos Alberto Riccelli	César Ribeiro
Cássio Gabus Mendes	Afonso Almeida Roitman
Cássia Kis	Leila Cantanhede
Nathália Timberg	Celina Aguiar Junqueira
Lília Cabral	Aldeíde Candeias
Pedro Paulo Rangel	Aldálio "Poliana" Candeias
Cláudio Corrêa e Castro	Bartolomeu Meireles
Adriano Reys	Renato Filipelli
Sérgio Mamberti	Eugênio
Cristina Prochaska	Laís
Stepan Nercessian	Jarbas
Rosane Gofman	Consuelo
Íris Bruzzi	Eunice Meireles
Marcos Palmeira	Mário Sérgio
Maria Gladys	Lucimar da Silva
Paula Lavigne	Daniela
Fábio Villa Verde	Tiago Augusto Roitman Cantanhede
Flávia Monteiro	Fernanda
Danton Mello	Bruno Meireles
Otávio Müller	Sardinha
Lala Deheinzelin	Cecília Cantanhede
Marcello Novaes	André
Paulo Reis	Olavo
João Camargo	Freitas
Dennis Carvalho	William
Jairo Lourenço	Luciano
Fernando Almeida	Hermenegildo (Gildo)
Daniel Filho	Rubens "Rubinho" Accioli
Cristina Galvão	Íris
Lourdes Mayer	Vó Pequenina
Zeni Pereira	Maria José (Zezé)
Rita Malot	Marieta
Renata Castro Barbosa	Flávia
Paulo Porto	Mauro Queiroz
Nara de Abreu	Deise
Ivan de Albuquerque	Laudelino
João Bourbonnais	Walter (Odete's lover)
Zilka Salaberry	Ruth
Martha Linhares	Suzana
Tânia Boscoli	Zenilda
Ana Lúcia Monteiro	Marina
Carlos Gregório	Gerson (Helena's psychologist)
Danton Jardim	Marcondes (Marco Aurélio's aircraft pilot)
Edson Fieschi	Carlos
Paulo César Grande	Franklin (César's friend)
Fábio Junqueira	Fred (Ivan's friend)
Rogério Fróes	Chief of police
Walney Costa	Detective
Bia Seidl	Marília
Sebastião Vasconcelos	Salvador (Raquel's father)
Maria Isabel de Lizandra	Marisa (Raquel's friend — in Foz do Iguaçu)
Ludoval Campos	Fernando
Paulo Villaça	Gustavo
Marcos Manzano	Giovanni

== Legacy ==
The telenovela's themes reflected the changes and questions facing Brazilian society in the late 1980s, when the country faced several changes with the end of the military regime and the promulgation of a new constitution.

Filming for the series began on 16 November 1987, and ended on 6 January 1989, with a total of 204 episodes produced.

Odete Roitman and Marco Aurélio portrayed the typical corrupt people in the country, while Raquel and Ivan symbolized the lives of millions of Brazilians.

The title originally intended for the novela was "Motherland" which became unfeasible because it already existed as the name of a film by Tizuka Yamasaki.

Daniel Filho mentions in his book The Electronic Circus:

"In the first synopsis, the daughter sold the house around chapter 40 or 50. Of course, other parallel stories would be happening. But the central theme didn't take off. I argued: 'If the daughter doesn't sell the house in the first chapter and the mother is left destitute, the novel won't achieve its objective.' In other words, it wouldn't make its theme clear. Denis Carvalho - the director - agrees. Aguinaldo's presence and Leonor's conciliatory manner made the author extend that situation from chapter 40 to number 1."

In episode 193, which aired on 24 December 1988, the villain Odete Roitman was murdered with three shots fired at point-blank range. The mystery of the killer's identity lasted only 13 days, but dominated conversations across the country. Nestlé held a contest to win the prize for guessing the killer's name. The nation paused in front of its television on 6 January 1989, to find out who the killer was.

The mystery of the identity of Odete Roitman's killer became the target of bets, raffles, and drawings. The shooting scene was recorded minutes before the day the final episode was scheduled to air. Not even the cast knew, until Denis Carvalho dismissed the other actors, announcing it would be Leila. Beatriz Segall first reacted to the murder by congratulating her co-star. Reason for the murder: Leila entered the apartment, blinded by jealousy, looking for Maria de Fátima, but missed, firing her gun at the villain. She thought the person there, with her husband Marco Aurélio, was his lover, Maria de Fátima.

Until some time after finishing the novel, Beatriz Segall refused to talk about her performance, as she tried to dispel the ghost of the villain with the work she did after Vale Todo.

Beatriz Segall says that after her character was killed off, an advertising agency created a campaign for an insurance company, in which, beneath a photo of the actress, the phrase read: "You never know what tomorrow will be. Get insurance."

Nine years later, Beatriz Segall and Glória Pires reunited for the remake of Anjo Mau. The former only agreed to appear on the soap opera if the character wasn't a bad woman. In the scene from Anjo Mau where Clotilde and Nice meet, alluding to their roles in Vale Todo, the former claims to know the latter from somewhere.

In addition to the question of ethics and honesty, Vale Todo addressed the tragedy of alcoholism and, for the first time, explicitly portrayed female homosexuality. As a result, the novel faced some problems with censorship. Several dialogues between the characters Cecília and Laís, the lesbians in the story, had to be rewritten after the scene in which the two told Helena about the prejudice they faced because of their relationship was banned.

In 1995, the Cuban government decided to legalize a network of private restaurants that had been operating clandestinely since 1993, in a bold gesture to curb the exclusive exploitation of the sector. These family-run restaurants are called "Paladares," named after Raquel's food company in the novel.

There were many striking scenes, such as the murder of Odete, committed by Leila; Marco Aurélio fleeing the country in a jet and waving his arms in triumph; Helena, completely drunk, is encouraged to join Alcoholics Anonymous, which is reflected in the high attendance of viewers at AA meetings; and Raquel tearing Maria de Fatima's wedding dress in a nervous breakdown masterfully interpreted by Regina Duarte.

== Awards ==
Troféu APCA (1988)

- Best Telenovela - Vale Tudo
- Best Actress - Glória Pires
- Best Supporting Actor - Sérgio Mamberti
- Male Revelation - Paulo Reis

Troféu Imprensa (1988)

- Best Telenovela - Vale Tudo
- Best Actress - Beatriz Segall and Glória Pires
