= Negócio da China =

- Genre: Telenovela
- Created by: Miguel Falabella
- Written by: Flávio Marinho; Antônia Pellegrino
- Directed by: Mauro Mendonça Filho; Roberto Talma
- Starring: Jui Huang; Bruna Marquezine; Anderson Lau; Grazi Massafera; Ricardo Pereira; Rodrigo Mendonça; Thiago Fragoso; Fernanda de Freitas; Juliana Didone
- Opening theme: "Lig-Lig-Lig-Lé" by Ney Matogrosso
- Country of origin: Brazil
- Original language: Portuguese
- No. of episodes: 136

Production
- Production locations: Hong Kong; Portugal
- Camera setup: Multi-camera
- Production company: Central Globo de Produção

Original release
- Network: Rede Globo
- Release: 6 October 2008 – 13 March 2009

Negócio da China is a Brazilian telenovela produced and broadcast by Globo. It premiered on 6 October 2008, replacing Ciranda de Pedra, and ended on 13 March 2009, replaced by Paraíso. The series is written by Miguel Falabella, with the collaboration of Mauro Mendonça Filho and Roberto Talma.

It stars Jui Huang, Bruna Marquezine, Anderson Lau, Grazi Massafera, Ricardo Pereira, Rodrigo Mendonça, Thiago Fragoso, Fernanda de Freitas and Juliana Didone.

== Plot ==
In Macau, China, Liu (Jui Huang) stole 1 billion euros from a casino, not knowing it belonged to the Chinese mafia, through a digital transaction in which the data was recorded on a flash drive. Pursued, he flees to Portugal and the device ends up in the suitcase João (Ricardo Pereira), who is moving to Brazil, causing Liu to also have to travel to Brazil to try to recover it. Liu goes to live in Parque das Nações, a suburb of Rio de Janeiro, where he falls in love with the martial arts fighter Flor de Lys (Bruna Marquezine), but the two have to face Wu (Anderson Lau), a Chinese mercenary and Liu's cousin, who also wants the money and put an end to the hacker. There is also Stelinha (Fernanda Rodrigues), who returns to Brazil after years living in Asia, where she joined another Chinese faction that also wants fortune, in addition to rivaling Flor on the mat.

Meanwhile, João falls in love with Lívia (Grazi Massafera), who struggles to raise her son Théo (Eike Duarte) on her own, the result of a troubled marriage with Heitor (Fábio Assunção), whose mothers Luli (Eliana Rocha) and Suzete (Yoná Magalhães) tormented the two until they separated. After Heitor is murdered for finding out about the flash drive, Lívia starts to live a romance with João, but is also harassed and persecuted by the psychotic Ramiro (Rodrigo Mendonça).

== Cast ==
- Jui Huang as Liu Chuang
- Bruna Marquezine as Flor de Lys Silvestre
- Grazi Massafera as Lívia Noronha
- Ricardo Pereira as João Viegas
- Anderson Lau as Wu Chuang
- Fernanda Rodrigues as Stela Falcão "Stelinha"
- Rodrigo Mendonça as Ramiro Veláquez
- Thiago Fragoso as Diego Dumas Fontanera
- Fernanda de Freitas as Antonella Bertazzi
- Juliana Didone as Maria Celeste Moreira
- Natália do Vale as Júlia Dumas Fontanera
- Herson Capri as Adriano Fontanera
- Luciana Braga as Denise Dumas
- Oscar Magrini as Mauro Bertazzi
- Vera Zimmermann as Joelma Bertazzi
- Ney Latorraca as Edmar Silvestre
- Leona Cavalli as Maralanis Silvestre
- Yoná Magalhães as Suzete Noronha
- Nathalia Timberg as Augusta Dumas
- Francisco Cuoco as Evandro Fontanera
- Cláudia Jimenez as Violante Gonçalves
- Xuxa Lopes as Abigail
- Déborah Kalume as Edilza
- Raoni Carneiro as Heraldo Alonso "Heraldinho"
- Dudu Pelizzari as Antônio José Moreira "Tozé"
- Izabella Bicalho as Zuleika
- Eliana Rocha as Luli Maria Alonso
- Joaquim Monchique as Belarmino Moreira
- Carla Andrino as Carminda Moreira
- Bia Nunnes as Matilde Fontanera
- Jandir Ferrari as Alaor
- Luciana Mizutani as Suyan
- Maria Vieira as Aurora Viegas
- Zezeh Barbosa as Semiramís
- Maria Gladys as Lucivone
- Débora Olivieri as Aldira
- Élida Muniz as Natália
- Bruce Gomlevsky as Nereu
- Élida L'Astorina as Vera
- Frederico Reuter as Zé Boneco
- Cláudia Netto as Dalva Falcão
- Sandro Christopher as Odilon Falcão
- Luca de Castro as Donato
- Isaac Bardavid as Homero
- Thelma Reston as Olímpia
- Duse Nacaratti as Tia Saudade
- Nil Neves as Isidoro
- Murilo Grossi as Othon
- Alby Ramos as Avelino
- Renata Vilela as Doctor Myrna
- Eike Duarte as Théo Noronha Alonso
- Amélia Bittencourt as Clarice
- Josie Antello as Lausanne
- Ernesto Xavier as Tamuz Moreira
- Elder Gatelli as Jasão
- Luciana Mivitami as Suy-Na
- Chao Chen as Zedong Yao

=== Special guest stars ===
- Fábio Assunção as Heitor Alonso
- Dalton Vigh as Dr. Otávio Della Riva
- Antônio Fagundes as Ernesto Dumas Fontanera
- Sérgio Loroza as Detetive Adílson
- Débora Lamm as Mariete Gonçalves
- Cacau Hygino as Pedro
- Victor Pecoraro as Felisberto
- Ellen Rocche as Laura
- Alexandre Zacchia as Zeílson
- Inez Vianna as Dóris
- Bruno Fagundes as Jander
- Luca de Castro as Donato
- Chico Tenreiro as Juiz de Paz

== Soundtrack ==
Negócio da China

Soundtrack album by Various artists
- Released: 13 November 2008
- Length: 40:13
- Label: Som Livre

Negócio da China is the soundtrack of the telenovela, released on 13 November 2008 by Som Livre.

No.	Title	Artist(s)	Length
1.	"Xi Shua Shua"	The Flowers	3:43
2.	"Samba da Zona"	Mariana Baltar	3:25
3.	"Eu Amo Você"	Tim Maia	3:31
4.	"Lugar Comum"	Sérgio Mendes & Jovanotti	3:16
5.	"Ainda Gosto Dela"	Skank & Negra Li	3:42
6.	"Tempo de Estio"	Jammil e Uma Noites & Caetano Veloso	3:20
7.	"Deixa Quieto"	Gabriel o Pensador	3:47
8.	"Devaneio"	Jorge Vercillo	3:45
9.	"Mais Alguém"	Roberta Sá	3:45
10.	"Vidro Fumê"	Ricky Vallen	3:20
11.	"De Volta Pro Amor"	Yahoo	3:24
12.	"Burguesinha"	Seu Jorge	3:15
13.	"Alguém como Tu"	Dick Farney	3:31
14.	"Simples Carinho"	Gal Costa	3:38
15.	"O Moço Velho"	Toni Platão	3:27
16.	"Lig Lig Lig Lé"	Ney Matogrosso	3:31
Total length:			40:13
