= Champagne (TV series) =

- Genre: Telenovela
- Directed by: Paulo Ubiratan; Wolf Maya
- Starring: Tony Ramos; Lúcia Veríssimo; Antônio Fagundes; Irene Ravache; Carla Camurati; Jorge Dória; Marieta Severo; Cássio Gabus Mendes; Cláudia Magno; Irving São Paulo; Mauro Mendonça; Ilka Soares; Sebastião Vasconcelos; Carlos Augusto Strazzer; Beatriz Segall; Armando Bógus
- Opening theme: "Casanova" by Ritchie
- Country of origin: Brazil
- Original language: Portuguese
- No. of episodes: 167

Production
- Running time: 50 minutes

Original release
- Network: TV Globo
- Release: 24 October 1983 – 4 May 1984

Related
- Louco Amor; Partido Alto

Champagne is a Brazilian telenovela produced and broadcast by TV Globo. It premiered on 24 October 1983 and ended on 4 May 1984, with a total of 167 episodes. It is the thirty first "novela das oito" to be aired on the timeslot. It is created and written by Cassiano Gabus Mendes and directed by Paulo Ubiratan, Wolf Maya and Mário Márcio.

== Cast ==
Actor	Character
Tony Ramos	Nilson (Nil)
Lúcia Veríssimo	Eliana (Eli)
Irene Ravache	Antônia Regina
Antônio Fagundes	João Maria de Andrade Galvão
Jorge Dória	José Brandão
Marieta Severo	Dinah Brandão
Carla Camurati	Bárbara
Cássio Gabus Mendes	Gregório Brandão (Greg)
Cláudia Magno	Mariah
Irving São Paulo	Zé Rodolfo
Sebastião Vasconcelos	Gastão
Ilka Soares	Tereza
Carlos Augusto Strazzer	Ronaldo
Mauro Mendonça	Jurandir
Beatriz Segall	Eunice
Armando Bógus	Farid
Louise Cardoso	Anita
Maria Isabel de Lizandra	Verônica
Cláudio Corrêa e Castro	Ralph
Eloísa Mafalda	Adélia
Isabel Ribeiro	Gilda
Nuno Leal Maia	Renan
Cecil Thiré	Lúcio
Mila Moreira	Fernanda
Ísis de Oliveira	Simone
Solange Theodoro	Marli
Luís Carlos Arutim	Camilo
Carlos Gregório	Dirceu
Dionísio Azevedo	João Carlos (Juca)
Henriqueta Brieba	Dona Luísa de Andrade Galvão (dona Luisinha)
Magalhães Graça	Napoleão
Maria Helena Dias	Olívia
Monah Delacy	Inês
Oswaldo Louzada	Aristides
Lídia Mattos	Carlota
Marcos Mello	Tadeu
Priscilla Rozenbaum	Cíntia
Gabriela Bicalho	Norma (Norminha)
