= Terra e Paixão =

2023 Brazilian telenovela

- Genre: Telenovela
- Created by: Walcyr Carrasco
- Written by: Thelma Guedes; Vinícius Vianna; Nelson Nadotti; Márcio Haiduck; Virgínia Velasco; Cleissa Regina Martins
- Directed by: Luiz Henrique Rios
- Starring: Cauã Reymond; Bárbara Reis; Johnny Massaro; Paulo Lessa; Débora Falabella; Agatha Moreira; Tony Ramos; Glória Pires
- Theme music composer: Paulo Sérgio Valle; César Augusto; Cláudio Noam
- Opening theme: "Sinônimos" by Chitãozinho & Xororó and Ana Castela
- Country of origin: Brazil
- Original language: Portuguese
- No. of seasons: 1
- No. of episodes: 221

Production
- Producers: Raphael Cavaco; Maurício Quaresma
- Production company: Estúdios Globo

Original release
- Network: TV Globo
- Release: 8 May 2023 – 19 January 2024

Terra e Paixão (English title: Land of Desire) is a Brazilian telenovela created by Walcyr Carrasco. It aired on TV Globo from 8 May 2023 to 19 January 2024. The series stars Bárbara Reis, Cauã Reymond, Glória Pires, Tony Ramos, Paulo Lessa, Agatha Moreira and Johnny Massaro.

== Cast ==
- Cauã Reymond as Caio Meirelles La Selva
- Bárbara Reis as Aline Barroso Machado
- Johnny Massaro as Daniel La Selva
- Paulo Lessa as Jonatas dos Santos
- Débora Falabella as Lucinda do Carmo Amorim
- Agatha Moreira as Graça Borghin Junqueira
- Tony Ramos as Antônio La Selva
- Glória Pires as Irene Pinheiro La Selva
- Eliane Giardini as Agatha Santini La Selva
- Tatá Werneck as Anely do Carmo / Rainha Delícia
- Rainer Cadete as Luigi San Marco
- Débora Ozório as Petra La Selva
- Ângelo Antônio as Raul Andrade Amorim (Andrade)
- Leandro Lima as Delegado Marino Guerra
- Jonathan Azevedo as Odilon Tavares
- Leona Cavalli as Gladys Borghin Junqueira
- Cláudio Gabriel as Tadeu Junqueira
- Thati Lopes as Berenice Aureliana (Berê)
- Alexandra Richter as Berenice Ferreira (Nice)
- Maicon Rodrigues as Rodrigo
- Charles Fricks as Ademir La Selva
- Tatiana Tiburcio as Jussara Barroso Machado
- Camilla Damião as Menah dos Santos
- Flávio Bauraqui as Gentil dos Santos
- Igor Angelkorte as Dr. Henrique Sampaio
- Gil Coelho as César Verdelho
- Suyane Moreira as Iraê Guató
- Renata Gaspar as Mara Mamberti
- Inez Viana as Angelina Assunção
- Jeniffer Dias as Victória Castro
- Kizi Vaz as Nina
- Valéria Barcellos as Luana Shine
- Bruna Aiiso as Dr. Laurita Corrêa
- Daniel Munduruku as Xamã Jurecê Guató
- Mapu Huni Kui as Raoni Guató
- Lourinelson Vladimir as Elias Mamberti
- Amaury Lorenzo as Ramiro Neves
- Diego Martins as Kelvin Santana
- Tairone Vale as Ruan Alves
- Natascha Stransky as Silvia
- Rafaela Cocal as Yandara Guató
- Márcio Tadeu as Juvenal Mourão
- Natalia Dal Molin as Graciara
- Letícia Laranja as Flor da Conceição
- Paulo Roque as Sidney
- Samir Murad as Pablo Ozen
- Rafael Gualandi as Enzo
- Edvana Carvalho as Lúcia
- Merícia Cassiano as Iná
- Ignácio Luz as Fernando "Nando"
- Matheus Assis as João Barroso Machado
- Felipe Melquiades as Cristian Kuerton Andrade
- Maria Carolina Basilio as Rosa
- Izabela Cardin as Melina Gonzales
- Susana Vieira as Cândida Rossini

== Production ==
=== Development ===
In December 2021, it was announced that Walcyr Carrasco was developing a new telenovela for TV Globo. The telenovela would have the title Terra Vermelha (Red Earth), however, because the name already belongs to a book with the same name by writer Domingos Pellegrini, the title was discarded. In addition, the network feared that the previous title had a political connotation, since the color red in the provisional name of the novel could be associated with the Workers' Party, the party of President Luiz Inácio Lula da Silva. In the meantime, some other titles for the telenovela were considered, such as Eu Sou a Terra (I Am the Earth), Terra Mãe (Motherland) and Terra Dourada (Golden Earth). Later, it was titled Terra Bruta (Raw Land), but in February 2023, Globo confirmed Terra e Paixão (Land and Passion) as the new title of the telenovela.

Originally Amora Mautner was announced as director of the telenovela, but exited the project because of her disagreements with Walcyr Carrasco in the second season of Verdades Secretas. Mautner was replaced by Luiz Henrique Rios. Between October and December 2022 during pre-production, Carrasco and Rios visited some locations in Mato Grosso do Sul to define the beginning of the plot's filming location. To advise Walcyr Carrasco on the themes involving native peoples, Globo hired the indigenous writer Daniel Munduruku. After a few months of preparations, workshops and cast meetings at Globo Studios, filming began at the end of January 2023, in the cities of Dourados and Deodápolis, in Mato Grosso do Sul. Part of the cast filmed scenes on farms in the region.

=== Casting ===
Because of her performances in the Walcyr Carrasco's previous works, Agatha Moreira was announced in the lead role, but due to a racial representation issue enforced by the network to include black characters in main roles, the actress ended up being reallocated to portray an antagonist in the plot. With the main character's ethnicity defined, Erika Januza and Larissa Nunes were names considered for the role, but Bárbara Reis was cast after Carrasco and director Luiz Henrique Rios saw her performance in Todas as Flores.

== Ratings ==
| Season | Episodes | First aired | | Last aired | | Avg. viewers (points) |
| Season | Episodes | Date | Viewers (points) | Date | Viewers (points) | Avg. viewers (points) |
|---|---|---|---|---|---|---|
| 1 | 221 | 8 May 2023 | 24.8 | 19 January 2024 | 31.8 | 26.5 |
