= The Long Haul (1988 film) =

1982 film directed by Paulo Thiago

The Long Haul is a 1988 Brazilian drama film directed by Paulo Thiago and starring Carlos Alberto Riccelli, Glória Pires and Dean Stockwell. Jorge, a Brazilian truck driver, undertakes a difficult long-distance journey to assist his boss and friend. Its Brazilian title is Jorge, um Brasileiro.

== Cast ==
- Carlos Alberto Riccelli as Jorge
- Glória Pires as Sandra
- Dean Stockwell as Mario
- Denise Dumont as Fernanda
- Antônio Grassi as Fefeu
- Roberto Bonfim as Altair
- Fábio Junqueira as Fabio
- Paulo Castelli as Toledo
- Jackson De Souza as Oliveira
- Imara Reis as Helena
- Waldir Onofre as Telmo
