= Belíssima =

- Genre: Telenovela
- Created by: Sílvio de Abreu
- Directed by: Denise Saraceni
- Starring: Glória Pires; Tony Ramos; Fernanda Montenegro; Marcello Antony; Cláudia Abreu; Carolina Ferraz; Lima Duarte; Irene Ravache; Cláudia Raia; Reynaldo Gianecchini; Camila Pitanga
- Opening theme: "Você É Linda" by Caetano Veloso
- Country of origin: Brazil
- Original language: Portuguese
- No. of episodes: 209; 180 (international version)

Production
- Running time: 60 minutes

Original release
- Network: TV Globo
- Release: November 7, 2005 – July 6, 2006

Belíssima is a Brazilian telenovela that was produced and aired by TV Globo between November 7, 2005, and July 7, 2006, as the 8pm telenovela of the station, with a total of 209 chapters. It was written by Sílvio de Abreu in collaboration with Sérgio Marques and Vinícius Vianna, directed by Flávia Lacerda, Gustavo Fernandez and Natália Grimberg, with the general direction of Carlos Araújo, Luiz Henrique Rios and Denise Saraceni. It was produced by Denise Saraceni core, with Carmen Righetto research.

It stars Glória Pires, Fernanda Montenegro, Cláudia Abreu, Carolina Ferraz, Marcello Antony, Cláudia Raia, Reynaldo Gianecchini, Camila Pitanga, Alexandre Borges, Lima Duarte, Irene Ravache and Tony Ramos in the lead roles.

The telenovela was broadcast again on Rede Globo between June 4, 2018, and January 18, 2019, in 161 episodes.

== Cast ==
| Actor | Character |
|---|---|
| Glória Pires | Júlia Falcão Assumpção |
| Fernanda Montenegro | Beatriz "Bia" Falcão |
| Tony Ramos | Nikos Petrakis |
| Marcello Antony | André Santana |
| Cláudia Abreu | Vitória Rocha Assumpção |
| Cláudia Raia | Safira Solomos Güney |
| Reynaldo Gianecchini | Pascoal da Silva |
| Carolina Ferraz | Rebeca Cavalcanti |
| Patrícia Dejesus | Alice |
| Camila Pitanga | Mônica Santana |
| Marcos Palmeira | Gilberto Moura |
| Alexandre Borges | Alberto Sabatini |
| Lima Duarte | Murat Güney |
| Irene Ravache | Katina Solomos Güney |
| Vera Holtz | Ornela Sabatini |
| Pedro Paulo Rangel | Argemiro "Gigi" Falcão |
| Leopoldo Pacheco | Cemil Solomos Güney |
| Cauã Reymond | Mateus Güney |
| Vladimir Brichta | Narciso Solomos Güney |
| Henri Castelli | Pedro Assumpção |
| Letícia Birkheuer | Érica Assumpção |
| Nelson Xavier | Bento Pereira |
| Carmen Verônica | Mary Montilla |
| Íris Bruzzi | Guida Guevara |
| Ivone Hoffmann | Matilde |
| Jussara Freire | Flávia Tosca |
| Nicola Siri | Ciro Laurenza |
| Ítalo Rossi | Dr. Fernando Medeiros |
| Cacá Carvalho | Jamanta (Ariovaldo da Silva) |
| Marcelo Médici | Fladson Rodrigues |
| Maria Flor | Taís Junqueira Güney |
| Carlos Takeshi | Takae Shigeto |
| Gianfrancesco Guarnieri | Pepe Molina |
| Serafim Gonzalez | Aquilino "Quiqui" Santana |
| Guilherme Weber | Freddy Schneider |
| Leona Cavalli | Valdete Pereira |
| Mônica Torres | Karen |
| Thiago Martins | Tadeu Rocha |
| Ada Chaseliov | Esther Schneider |
| Sheron Menezes | Dagmar de Sousa |
| Lui Mendes | Lourenço |
| Lívia Falcão | Regina da Glória Teixeira |
| Paolla Oliveira | Giovanna Güney Sabatini |
| Bianca Comparato | Maria João Güney de Oliveira |
| Enrica Duncan | Soraya Güney |
| Leonardo Carvalho | Edmilson |
| Angelita Feijó | Yvete Barroso |
| Giácomo Pinotti | Djulian |
| Juliana Kametani | Susy Shigeto |
| Eduardo Hashimoto | Ernesto Shigeto |
| Juliana Martins | Kika |
| Via Negromonte | Diva Pacheco / Divina |
| Vitor Morosini | Isaac Güney Schneider |
| Marina Ruy Barbosa | Sabina Rocha Assumpção |
| Marcella Valente | Cristina Moura |
| Thomaz Veloso | Toninho |

== Reception ==
=== Ratings ===
| Timeslot | Episodes | Premiere | | Finale | | Rank | Season | Average viewership |
| Timeslot | Episodes | Date | Viewers (in points) | Date | Viewers (in points) | Rank | Season | Average viewership |
|---|---|---|---|---|---|---|---|---|
| Mondays—Saturdays; 9:00pm | 209 | 7 November 2005 | 52 | 7 July 2006 | 60 | #1 | 2005-06 | 48,5 |
