= Leona Cavalli =

Brazilian actress

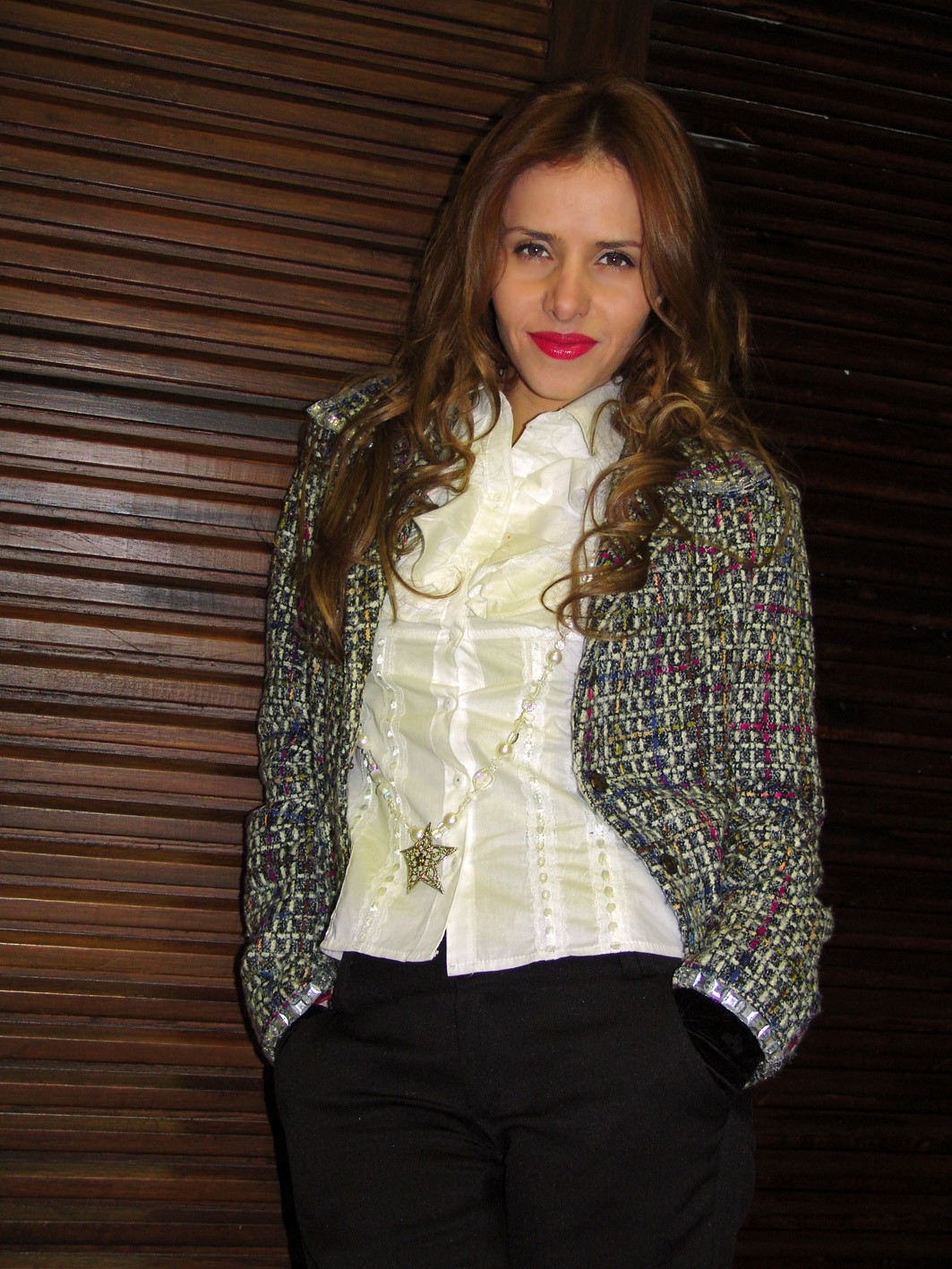
- Cavalli in 2006
- Born: Alleyona Canedo da Silva; 6 November 1969 (age 56); Rosário do Sul, Rio Grande do Sul, Brazil
- Education: Federal University of Rio Grande do Sul (dropped out); Pontifical Catholic University of São Paulo
- Occupations: Actress, director
- Years active: 1993–present
- Website: www.leonacavalli.com.br

Alleyona Canedo da Silva (born 6 November 1969), known professionally as Leona Cavalli, is a Brazilian actress and stage director.

== Biography ==
Her father politician, lawyer and poet and teacher mother's name, has three brothers. At birth, was named Alleyona. Her mother wanted it to be Leona, but the father thought the name too strong for a baby and decided to adapt - it. Cavalli comes from their sponsors.

Her childhood was in nature, playing fields by the gauchos, where the horse ran, climbed trees, swam praticaca and many other sports. With her father, who was twice mayor of the city, learned early to live with a lot of people climbing on the stump, attending rallies without bothering to be the daughter of a public person alive. With his mother, learned to appreciate the beauty and love freedom.

At age ten she was traveling, had boyfriends and wanted to be an actress.

she participated in several parts as, A Divina Sarah, As Lágrimas Amargas de Petra Von Kant, Brincando em cima Daquilo, O Homem e o Cavalo, etc.

Then came the UFRGS, in the course of Performing Arts and the PUC, in the course of law. But, dropped everything and went to St. Paul in an attempt to do theater professionally.

Participated in several films such as, Um Céu de Estrelas, Amarelo Manga, Carandiru, Olga, Antônia, Aparecida - O Milagre, etc.

Is also participated in several telenovelas and miniseries as, Da Cor do Pecado, Começar de Novo, Belíssima, Bang Bang, the miniseries Amazônia, de Galvez a Chico Mendes, Duas Caras, Negócio da China, etc. Leona participated in an episode of Casos e Acasos (Globo).

Leona in 2010, participates in the miniseries Dalva e Herivelto portraying the character Margot, and is also in the theater with the monologue "Máscaras de Penas Penadas". In 2010, he participated in an episode of As Cariocas and A Vida Alheia, series aired by Globo, As well as appearing in the feature film Os Inquilinos.

In 2011, she made a cameo on the soap opera, Araguaia. Currently, this air, soap opera, A Vida da Gente as Dra. Celina. In 2012, made an appearance in the series As Brasileiras, in the episode A Justiceira de Olinda.

Zarolha plays the character in the remake of the telenovela Gabriela. In 2013 will be in the soap opera Amor à Vida of Walcyr Carrasco, the plot she interprets the medical Glauce.

== Filmography ==
=== Television ===
Year	Title	Role	Notes
2001	As Filhas da Mãe		Cameo
2002	Os Normais		ep: "Acima do Normal"
2003	A Grande Família	Vanessa	ep: "Costurando para Fora"
2004	Da Cor do Pecado	Edilásia Sardinha (young)	1ª Phase
2004	Começar de Novo	Lucrécia Borges (young)	1ª Phase
2005	Belíssima	Valdete Pereira	
2006	Bang Bang	Bandit	Cameo
2006	Pé na Jaca	Miranda	Cameo
2007	Amazônia, de Galvez a Chico Mendes	Justine	
2007	Duas Caras	Dália Mendes	
2008	Episódio Especial	Herself	Cameo
2008	Guerra e Paz	Miréia	1º ep: "Velozes e Infiéis"
2008	Casos e Acasos	Célia	15º ep: "A Nova Namorada, o Chefe e o Dia Fértil"
2008	A Grande Família	Rebeca	ep: "Era Uma Vez no Motel"
2008	Negócio da China	Maralanis Silvestre	
2009	Aline	Vera	eps: "Aline Gorda", "Aline TPM"
2010	Dalva e Herivelto - Uma canção de amor	Margot	
2010	A Vida Alheia	Magda Kosmo	ep: "O Sequestro"
2010	Na Forma da Lei	Belinda Azambuja	ep: "Maratona"
2010	As Cariocas	Rita	ep: "A Traída da Barra"
2011	Araguaia	Marly	Cameo
2011	A Vida da Gente	Dra. Celina	
2012	As Brasileiras	Valquíria	ep: "A Justiceira de Olinda"
2012	Gabriela	Zarolha	
2013	Amor à Vida	Glauce de Sá Benites	
2019	Órfãos da Terra	Teresa Monte Castelli	
2023	Terra e Paixão	Gladys Borghin Junqueira	
2025	Dona de Mim	Gabriela Moller Stoltz	

=== Film ===
Year	Title	Role	Notes
1996	Um Céu de Estrelas	Dalva	
1997	O Trabalho dos Homens	Raped woman	Short film
1999	Ilha	Mariana	
2000	Através da Janela	Simone	
2002	Mango Yellow	Lígia	
2003	Carandiru	Dina	
2004	Desequilíbrio	Prostituta	Short film
2004	Contra Todos	Cláudia	
2004	Olga	Maria	
2004	Capital Circulante		Short film
2005	Quanto Vale Ou É Por Quilo?	Clara	
2005	Cafundó	Rosário	
2006	Antônia		
2010	Os Inquilinos	Fátima	
2010	Aparecida - O Milagre	Sônia Resende	
