= Bia Seidl =

Brazilian actress (born 1961)

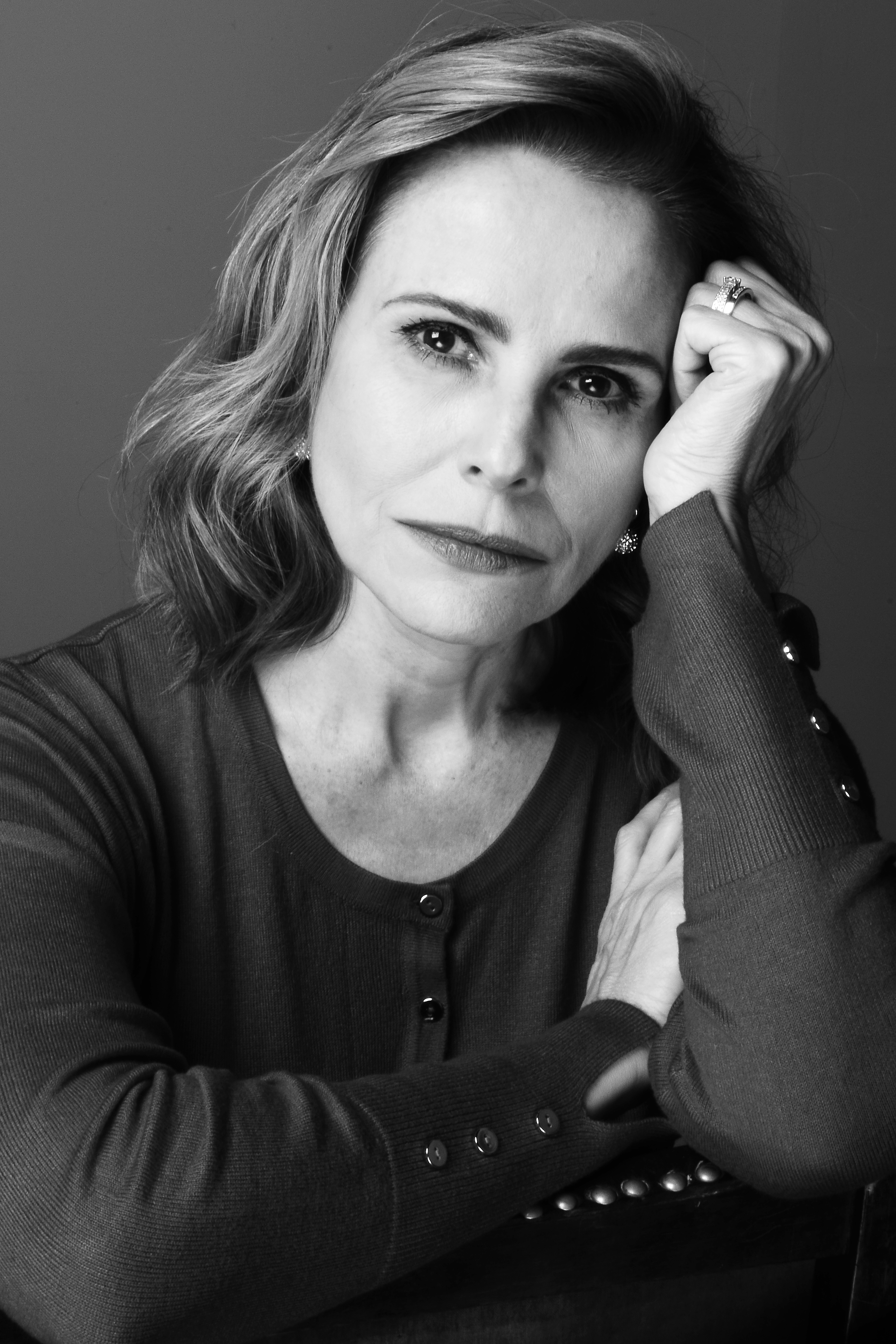
- Seidl in 2017
- Born: Maria Beatriz Parpinelli Seidl; 19 September 1961 (age 64); Rio de Janeiro, Brazil
- Occupation: Actress
- Years active: 1981–present
- Partner: Ronnie Von (1984–1986)
- Children: 2

Maria Beatriz Parpinelli Seidl (born 19 September 1961) is a Brazilian actress.

== Career ==
On television, she took roles in notable telenovelas and miniseries as Paraíso, Louco Amor, Dona Beija, Mandala, Vale Tudo, Vamp, Engraçadinha... Seus Amores e Seus Pecados, Memorial de Maria Moura, Alma Gêmea and Insensato Coração. but she is best remembered by the performance as the bitchy and envious Gláucia in A Gata Comeu, one of her greatest hits.

Seidl was revealed on the Silvio de Abreu's telenovela Jogo da Vida.

Vera, her character in Malhação, discovered a breast cancer and was undergoing a radical mastectomy (choosing, a courageous decision not to reconstruct the breast lost).

In theater, she portrayed the protagonist on Bernard Shaw's play Candida.

In 2007 she made a cameo in the telenovela Duas Caras. In 2008, she was in two episodes of Casos e Acasos.

In 2009, she was cast in the microseries Deu a Louca no Tempo. In the same year, she took part in the remake Paraíso. The actress had been cast in the first version of this telenovela, in 1982.

In 2010 the actress participated in the series A Vida Alheia. In the following year, she took part in the telenovela Insensato Coração. In 2012, she was in Lado a Lado, playing Margarida.

In 2017, Bia Seidl signs with RecordTV to play Débora, one of the main characters in Apocalipse.

== Personal life ==
She married the singer Ronnie Von in 1984. They broke up some time later.

Bia Seidl has two children: Miranda, with actor Sérgio Mastropasqua, and the theater producer Daniel.

== Filmography ==
=== Television ===
Year	Title	Role	Notes
1981	Jogo da Vida	Vivian	
1982	Paraíso	Edith	
1983	Louco Amor	Luciana	
1984	Corpo a Corpo	Laís	Special participation
1985	A Gata Comeu	Gláucia Brandão Penteado	
1986	Dona Beija	Ana Felizardo Sampaio (Aninha)	
1986	Tudo ou Nada	Odila Bourbon	
1987	Mandala	Mariana	
1988	Vale Tudo	Marília Dias	Episodes: "December 26, 1988–January 6, 1989"
1989	O Sexo dos Anjos	Angel of Death / Diana	
1990	Delegacia de Mulheres	Mariana	Episode: "Elas não Usam Black-tie"
1990	Mico Preto	Beatriz Borges	
1991	Caso Especial	Joana	Episode: "Marina"
1991	Vamp	Soninha	
1992	Você Decide	Cristina	Episode: "Armadilha do Destino"
1992	Perigosas Peruas	attorney Cidinha	Special participation
1993	Contos de Verão	Renata	
1993	Você Decide		Episode: "O Filho da Outra"
1994	Memorial de Maria Moura	Bela	
1994	Você Decide	Elza	Episode: "Mãe Solteira"
1995	Engraçadinha... Seus Amores e Seus Pecados	Sílvio's mother	Special participation
1995	Sangue do Meu Sangue	Pola Renon	
1997	Os Ossos do Barão	Lavínia	
1998	Estrela de Fogo	Luciana	
2000	Você Decide	Francis	Episode: "Golpe de Mestre"
2000	Você Decide		Episode: "Admirável Mundo Novo"
2001	Malhação	Vera Ferreira	Season 8
2003	Jamais Te Esquecerei	Leonor	
2005	Alma Gêmea	Vera Dias Enck	
2006	Bicho do Mato	Laura Rodrigues	
2007	Duas Caras	Gabriela Fonseca do Nascimento	Episodes: "October 1–2, 2007"
2008	Casos e Acasos	Cristiana	Episode: "O Triângulo, a Tia Raquel e o Pedido"
2008	Casos e Acasos	Paloma	Episode: "O Papai Noel, a Perna Quebrada e o Presépio"
2009	Deu a Louca no Tempo	Lola	
2009	Paraíso	Aurora Medeiros	
2010	A Vida Alheia	Leila	Episode: "A Vítima"
2011	Insensato Coração	Helena	Episodes: "May, 2–July 26, 2011"
2012	Lado a Lado	Margarida Lemos Vieira	
2013	Dança dos Famosos 10	Herself	Participant (Domingão do Faustão's reality show)
2017	A Vida Secreta dos Casais	Alice	
2017	Apocalipse	Débora Koheg	
2018	Valor da Vida	Maria Pia	In Portugal on the TVI channel

=== Film ===
Year	Title	Role
1984	Os Trapalhões e o Mágico de Oróz	Mary
1987	Os Fantasmas Trapalhões	Leila
1987	Eu	Berenice
