= Maria Gladys =

Brazilian actress (born 1939)

- Born: Maria Gladys Mello da Silva; 23 November 1939 (age 86); Rio de Janeiro, Brazil
- Occupation: Actress
- Years active: 1959–present
- Children: 3
- Relatives: Mia Goth (granddaughter)

Maria Gladys Mello da Silva (Brazilian Portuguese: [maˈɾi.ɐ ˈɡladʒiʒ ˈmɛlu da ˈsiwvɐ]; born 23 November 1939) is a Brazilian actress. Gladys made her acting debut in 1959 with Arthur Azevedo's play O Mambembe at the Municipal Theater of Rio de Janeiro. She earned recognition in the theater world by appearing topless in the publicity poster for the play O Chão dos Penitentes. She is considered the mother of marginal cinema.

== Biography ==
Gladys was born in the Cachambi neighborhood, in Rio de Janeiro, Brazil. At three, she contracted polio, and at fifteen, became pregnant. She then moved with her family to the Grajaú neighbourhood, where she gave birth to her first son, Glayson; his father soon vanished. In Grajaú, Gladys met notable figures like Erasmo Carlos, Carlos Imperial, Tim Maia and Roberto Carlos, whom she started dating. During this period, she became one of the official dancers on the TV show Clube do Rock, created by Carlos Imperial.

In the late 1950s, Gladys pursued acting and moved with her family to Copacabana, in Rio's south zone. She made her theatrical debut in 1959 with Arthur Azevedo's play O Mambembe at the Municipal Theater of Rio de Janeiro, performing alongside Fernanda Montenegro, Fernando Torres, Sérgio Britto and Ítalo Rossi. Concurrently, while training as an actress, Gladys joined the Teatro Jovem company. She made waves in the theater world by appearing topless in the publicity poster for the play O Chão dos Penitentes, becoming the first serious actress in Brazil to display her body publicly. In 1962, she starred in the play Sétimo Céu, directed by her friend Domingos de Oliveira.

Being part of the resistance during the Brazilian dictatorship led Gladys to exile in London between 1965 and 1979. In 1973, Gladys met American artist Lee Jaffe in London, and forty years later, it was revealed that he was the father of Rachel. Rachel is the mother of the movie star Mia Goth, making Jaffe her grandfather.

Later, Gladys lived with Betty Faria and shared a house in Vidigal with Leila Diniz. Following her mother's death and her father's return to the suburbs to care for his grandson, Gladys starred in Ruy Guerra's 1964 film Os Fuzis, which won the Silver Bear at the Berlin Festival and was nominated for the Golden Bear.

On television, she appeared in significant productions like Brilhante, Bandidos da Falange, As Noivas de Copacabana, Hilda Furacão, Um Anjo Caiu do Céu, A Lua Me Disse and Aquele Beijo. Her most iconic role, however, was Lucimar da Silva in Vale Tudo.

In 2016, she portrayed Dr. Elizabeth Tacanha in the TV Globo series Pé na Cova.

== Filmography ==
=== Film ===
Long and short films
Year	Title	Role
1961	Por um Céu de Liberdade	Nurse
1963	Bonitinha, mas Ordinária	Sister of Rita
1964	The Guns	Luísa
1965	Canalha em Crise	—N/a
1966	Um Diamante e Cinco Balas	Flôr
1966	Todas as Mulheres do Mundo	Glorinha
1968	Copacabana Me Engana	—N/a
1968	Edu, Coração de Ouro	Neusinha
1968	Como Vai, Vai Bem?	Teresa
1969	O Anjo Nasceu	—N/a
1970	Cuidado Madame	
1970	Sem Essa, Aranha	—N/a
1970	É Simonal!	—N/a
1970	Meu Pé de Laranja Lima	Professor Cecília
1970	A Família do Barulho	—N/a
1971	Sangue Quente em Tarde Fria	—N/a
1971	O Donzelo	—N/a
1971	O Capitão Bandeira contra o Dr. Moura Brasil	Gladys
1971	Piranhas do Asfalto	—N/a
1971	Lúcia McCartney, uma Garota de Programa	—N/a
1971	Mangue Bangue	—N/a
1976	Bandalheira Infernal	—N/a
1977	Anchieta, José do Brasil	Timbaúba
1978	O Gigante da América	—N/a
1978	Agonia	—N/a
1982	Rio Babilônia	
1983	Bar Esperança	Martha
1985	Brás Cubas	—N/a
1985	Os Bons Tempos Voltaram: Vamos Gozar Outra Vez	Alzira
1985	Um Filme 100% Brasileiro	—N/a
1987	O Bebê	—N/a
1988	Natal da Portela	—N/a
1990	Guns	Uncredited
1991	A Grande Arte	Woman Under Billboards
1991	Killed the Family and Went to the Movies	Mother of Bebeto
1992	As Noivas de Copacabana - O Filme	Rita
1994	Geraldo Voador	—N/a
1995	O Monge e a Filha do Carrasco	—N/a
2001	A Breve Estória de Cândido Sampaio	—N/a
2003	Apolônio Brasil, Campeão da Alegria	—N/a
2006	If I Were You	Cida
2007	Polaroides Urbanas	—N/a
2007	Meu Nome é Dindi	Dona Carmen
2008	Pequenas Histórias	Dona Hanna
2008	Casa da Mãe Joana	Party Drunk
2009	Se Eu Fosse Você 2	Cida
2010	The Joy	Luiza's Aunt
2011	Rat Fever	Stella Maris
2013	Cute, But Ordinary	Ritinha's Sisters (uncredited)
2015	All of God's Creations	DaGuia - Miguel's Mother
2017	Duas de Mim	Sonja

=== Television ===
Novels, Series and Minisseries
Year	Title	Role	Notes
1979	Plantão de Polícia	—N/a	(episode:O Estrangulador da Praça Tiradentes)
1981	Brilhante	Dinalva	
1983	Bandidos da Falange	Soninha	
1984	Padre Cícero	Ifigênia	
1985	Grande Sertão: Veredas	Maria do Padre	
1988	Vale Tudo	Lucimar da Silva	
1988	Chapadão do Bugre	—N/a	
1989	Top Model	Veridiana (Big Loira)	
1989	Delegacia de Mulheres	Detetive Alvarenga	4 episodes
1990	Meu Bem, Meu Mal	Eusébia	
1992	As Noivas de Copacabana	Rita de Cássia	
1992	Tereza Batista	Felipa	
1993	Fera Ferida	Lucineide	
1995 - 1999	Você Decide	Aurora, Maria, Cândida, Eleutéria	5 episodes
1996	Salsa e Merengue	Neném	
1998	Corpo Dourado	Mazinha	
1998	Hilda Furacão	Cecília Bonfim	
1998	Mulher	Rita	(episode: Desejos Incontroláveis)
2001	Um Anjo Caiu do Céu	Zezé	
2002	O Beijo do Vampiro	Gracinda	
2004	Senhora do Destino	Dona Mimi	
2005	A Lua Me Disse	Naíde	
2006	A Diarista, Números Primos	Aunt Palmira	
2006	Sítio do Picapau Amarelo	Fátima	2 episodes
2006	Prova de Amor	Mother of de Elza	Special participation
2007	Guerra e Paz	Zoraide	
2008	Negócio da China	Lucivone	
2008	Beleza Pura	Romena	
2009	Toma Lá, Dá Cá	Sundaí	1 episode
2009	Caminho das Índias	Glorinha	Special participation
2010	A Vida Alheia	Nadir	1 episode
2011	Aquele Beijo	Eveva	
2014	As Canalhas	Luciene	
2014	Sexo e as Negas	Fumaça	
2016	Pé na Cova	Dra. Elizabeth Tacanha	
