= Besame Mucho (1987 film) =

1987 Brazilian film directed by Francisco Ramalho Jr.

Perfumed Ball
- Theatrical release poster
- Directed by: Francisco Ramalho Jr.
- Written by: Francisco Ramalho Jr. Mário Prata
- Based on: Besame Mucho by Mário Prata
- Produced by: Francisco Ramalho Jr. Hector Babenco; Leda Borges
- Starring: Antônio Fagundes; Christiane Torloni; José Wilker; Glória Pires
- Narrated by: Bob Floriano
- Cinematography: José Tadeu Ribeiro
- Edited by: Mauro Alice
- Music by: Wagner Tiso
- Production company: H.B. Filmes
- Distributed by: Embrafilme
- Release date: August 13, 1987
- Running time: 108 minutes
- Country: Brazil
- Language: Portuguese

Besame Mucho is a 1987 Brazilian romance drama film directed by Francisco Ramalho Jr., based on the play of the same name by Mário Prata.

== Cast ==
- Antônio Fagundes as Tuca
- Christiane Torloni as Dina
- José Wilker as Xico
- Glória Pires as Olga
- Giulia Gam as Aninha
- Paulo Betti as César
- Isabel Ribeiro as Encarnacion
- Linda Gay as Dina's mother
- Wilma Aguiar as Tuca's mother
- Jesse James as watchman
- Iara Jamra as debutante #1
- Vera Zimmermann as debutante #2

== Production ==
The filming took place in July 1986 in different locations of São Paulo, including Faculdade São Franscisco and Cine Copan.

== Reception ==
It was awarded the Best Film at the 13th Festival de Cine Iberoamericano de Huelva, Best Screenplay at the Cartagena Film Festival, and won the Best Screenplay and Best Costume Design awards at the 15th Gramado Film Festival.
