= Anjo Mau (1997 TV series) =

- Genre: Telenovela
- Created by: Cassiano Gabus Mendes (original work); Maria Adelaide Amaral (version 1997)
- Starring: Glória Pires; Kadu Moliterno; Alessandra Negrini; Leonardo Brício; Maria Padilha; Daniel Dantas; Regina Dourado; Cláudio Corrêa e Castro; Mauro Mendonça; Beatriz Segall; José Lewgoy; Jackson Antunes; Lília Cabral; Márcio Garcia; Lavínia Vlasak; Luciano Szafir
- Opening theme: "Cruzando Raios"
- Composer: Orlando Morais
- Country of origin: Brazil
- Original language: Portuguese
- No. of episodes: 173

Production
- Running time: 40 minutes

Original release
- Network: TV Globo
- Release: September 8, 1997 – March 27, 1998

Related
- Anjo Mau (1976)

Anjo Mau (English: Evil Angel) is a remake of the original 1976 Brazilian telenovela that was produced and broadcast by TV Globo between September 8, 1997, and March 27, 1998. It was produced in 173 chapters.

Glória Pires, Kadu Moliterno, Alessandra Negrini, Leonardo Brício, Maria Padilha, Daniel Dantas, Mauro Mendonça and Gabriel Braga Nunes appear in the leading roles.

== Synopsis ==
Nice is a poor young woman with an angelic face but far from angelic actions. She refuses to accept a predictable fate: marrying her boyfriend from the suburbs and having lots of children. She takes a job as a nanny in the Medeiros family mansion, where her father, Augusto, already works as a chauffeur. There, she falls in love with Rodrigo, the brother of her employer, Stela. The nanny uses every trick in the book to win him over, dreaming of the day she will become the lady of that grand house.

Nice takes advantage of what she learns in the mansion to stir up conflict and get closer to Rodrigo. He is about to marry Paula when, thanks to a scheme orchestrated by the nanny, he discovers that his fiancée is cheating on him with his own brother, the playboy Ricardo. Disillusioned by the betrayal and determined to defy his family and the arrogance of the high society around him, Rodrigo begins appearing at nightclubs with Nice at his side.

But the path is still not fully open for the nanny. Rodrigo becomes enchanted by the sweet Lígia, who is in love with him, and Nice uses her own brother, Luís Carlos, to come between the two. While fighting to win Rodrigo’s heart in the Medeiros mansion, Nice lives a nightmare at home. She is the adopted daughter of Augusto and Alzira. Her father treats her with affection, but Alzira harbours a strange disdain for her and hides a secret from the past.

Other storylines weave together the lives of the rich and the poor. Racial prejudice has driven a wedge between the simple Cida and her daughter Tereza, as well as her grandchildren. Now a high-society woman, Tereza is married to the millionaire Rui Novaes, and the couple has two children: Paula and Bruno. To her family, Tereza has claimed that her mother is dead, afraid they will discover she is part-Black. But when Bruno begins dating Vívian, Cida’s adopted daughter, Tereza is forced to confront the past she tried to bury.

The decline of the traditional São Paulo aristocracy—descendants of the earliest settlers—is also explored through the sisters Clotilde and Elisinha Jordão Ferraz, who try to conceal their ruin by keeping up appearances and swindling others. They join forces with the seamstress Goretti, who struggles to raise her daughter Simone. In the past, Goretti was abandoned by the man who got her pregnant. That man is Tadeu, now married to Stela Medeiros, and consumed by guilt, he tries to reconnect with the daughter he once rejected.

== Cast ==
in order of opening of the novela

Actor	Character
Glória Pires	Nice Noronha

Medeiros family

Actor	Character
José Lewgoy	Eduardo Medeiros
Kadu Moliterno	Rodrigo Medeiros
Maria Padilha	Stela Medeiros Fachini
Leonardo Brício	Ricardo Medeiros
Daniel Dantas	Tadeu Facchini

Novaes family

Actor	Character
Mauro Mendonça	Ruy Novaes
Alessandra Negrini	Paula Novaes
Luíza Brunet	Teresa Novaes
Emílio Orciollo Netto	Bruno Novaes

Alzira Machado family

Actor	Character
Cláudio Corrêa e Castro	Augusto
Regina Dourado	Alzira Machado
Márcio Garcia	Luís Carlos

Jordão Ferraz family

Actor	Character
Beatriz Segall	Clô (Clotilde Jordão)
Jackson Antunes	Fred (Frederico Jordão)
Ariclê Perez	Elisinha Jordão Ferraz
Bel Kutner	Helena Jordão Ferraz
Gabriel Braga Nunes	Olavinho Jordão Ferraz

Garcia family

Actor	Character
Lília Cabral	Goreti Garcia
Luís Salém	Benny Garcia

Noronha family

Actor	Character
Léa Garcia	Cida
Taís Araújo	Vívian

Furtado family

Actor	Character
Raul Gazolla	Ciro Furtado
Sérgio Viotti	Américo Abreu
Lavínia Vlasak	Lígia Abreu Furtado
Mila Moreira	Marilu Abreu Furtado

And more

Actor	Character
Thelma Reston	Tiana
Ivone Hoffmann	Geralda
Júlio Braga	Aragão
Ada Chaseliov	Dora
Marcela Raffea	Socorro
Átila Iório	Josias
Ana Beatriz Nogueira	Duda (Maria Eduarda Medeiros)

Twins

Bruno and Tiago	Téo (Teodoro Medeiros)

Presenting

Actor	Character
Samara Felippo	Simone Garcia
Luciano Szafir	Júlio
