= Vale todo =

- Genre: Telenovela; Drama
- Based on: Vale Tudo by Gilberto Braga
- Written by: Yves Dumont
- Directed by: Wolf Maya
- Starring: Itatí Cantoral; Diego Bertie; Javier Gómez; Ana Claudia Talancón; Zully Montero
- Opening theme: "Vale Todo" by José Cantoral
- Countries of origin: United States; Brazil
- Original language: Spanish
- No. of episodes: 150

Production
- Producer: Marcelo Fernández Paranhos
- Production locations: Rio de Janeiro, Brazil
- Running time: 42–45 minutes

Original release
- Network: Telemundo; Rede Globo
- Release: June 17, 2002

Related
- Acuarela; La venganza

Vale todo, is a telenovela co-produced in 2002 by Rede Globo and Telemundo. The soap opera was an adaptation of the 1988 Brazilian telenovela Vale Tudo and was released for the U.S. Hispanic market on June 17. It starred Mexican actress Itatí Cantoral and Peruvian actor Diego Bertie, and co-starred Argentine Javier Gómez, Ana Claudia Talancón, as well as actress Zully Montero.

== Cast ==
- Itatí Cantoral as Raquel Accioli
- Diego Bertie as Iván Corrêa
- Javier Gómez as Marco Aurélio Alvarez
- Ana Claudia Talancón as Maria de Fátima Accioli
- Antônio Fagundes as Salvador
- Roberto Mateos as Rubén
- Germán Barrios as Octavio
- Enrique Borja as Rodolfo
- Alejandra Borrero as Helena Almeida Roittman
- Carlos Caballero as Mario
- Marisol Colero as Mercedes
- Ricardo Chávez as Felipe
- Agmeth Escaf as Alfonso Almeida Roittman
- Jorge Adrián Espíndola as Júan
- Rossana Fernández Maldonado as Beatriz
- José Luis Franco as Renato
- Alberto Guerra as Bruno
- Khotan as Pablo Argos
- Consuelo Luzardo as Celina Almeida
- Santiago Magill as Santiago
- Paulo César Quevedo as César Ribeiro
- Carla Rodríguez as Fernanda
- Julio Rodríguez Caloggero as Eugenio
- Nadia Rowinsky as Aleida
- Verónica Terán as Maria José
- Elena Toledo as Isabel
- Patricia Valdez as Dolores
- Beatriz Vásquez as Leila
- Zully Montero as Lucrécia Almeida Roittman
- Paulo Said
- Santiago Maschender
