= Carlos Alberto Riccelli =

Brazilian film and television actor (born 1946)

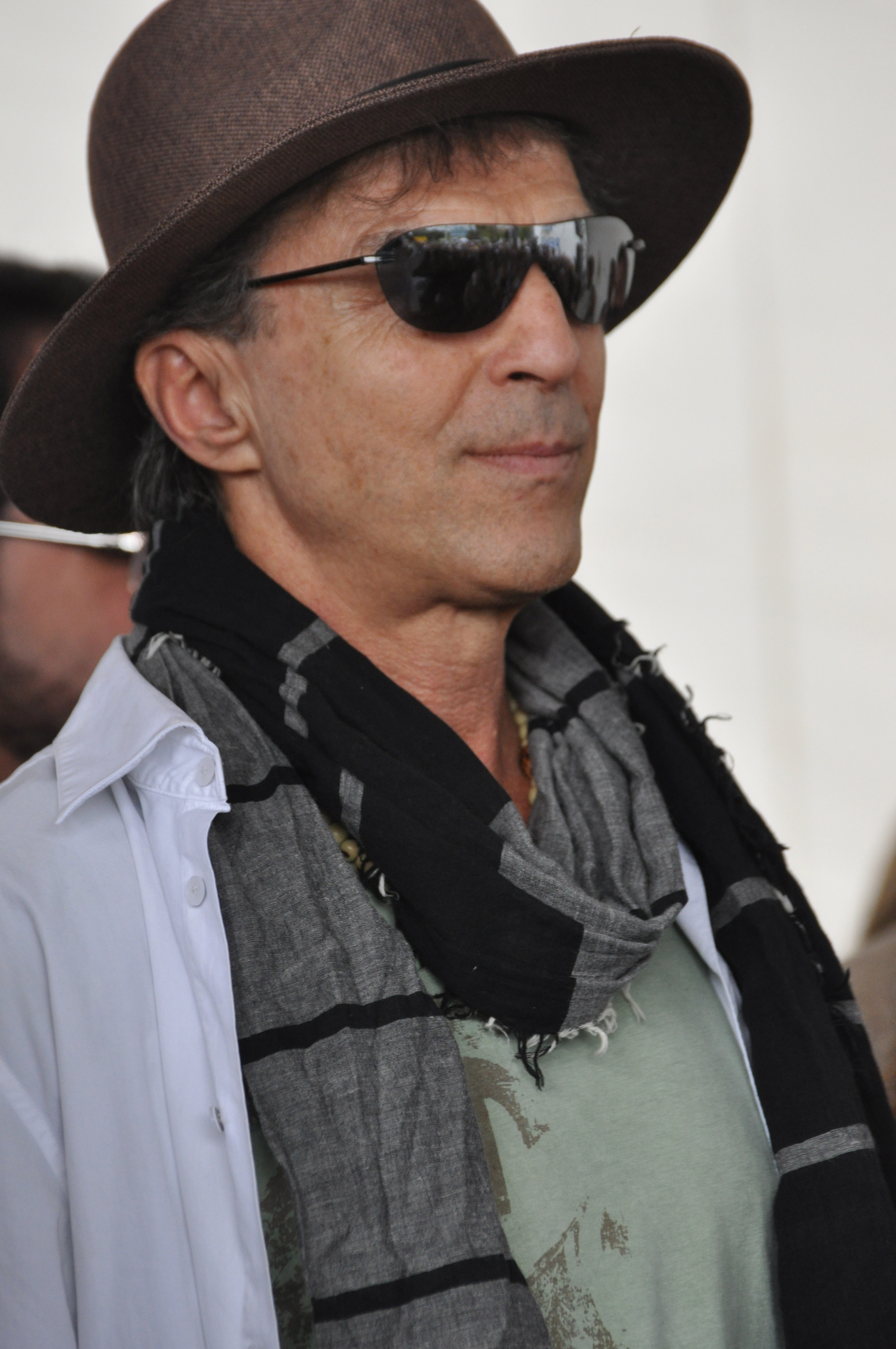
- Born: 3 July 1946 (age 78); São Paulo; Brazil
- Years active: 1970-

Carlos Alberto Riccelli is a Brazilian film and television actor.

== Selected filmography ==
- A Moreninha (1970)
- O Princípio do Prazer (1979)
- Leila Diniz (1987)
- The Long Haul (1988)
- The Best Revenge (1996)
- Federal (2010)

== Television ==
- Supermanoela (1974)
- Sétimo Sentido (1982)
- Louco Amor (1983)
- Vale Tudo (1988)
- Chiquinha Gonzaga (1999)
