= If I Were You 3 =

2026 film by Anita Barbosa

- Portuguese: Se Eu Fosse Você 3
- Directed by: Anita Barbosa
- Written by: Leandro Santos
- Produced by: Daniel Filho; Vilma Lustosa
- Starring: Glória Pires; Tony Ramos; Cleo Pires; Rafael Infante
- Edited by: Diana Vasconcellos
- Production company: Total Entertainment
- Distributed by: Buena Vista International
- Release date: 8 October 2026
- Country: Brazil
- Language: Portuguese

If I Were You 3 (Portuguese: Se Eu Fosse Você 3) is a 2026 Brazilian comedy film directed by Anita Barbosa, sequel to Se Eu Fosse Você (2006) and Se Eu Fosse Você 2 (2009).

The film was released on October 8, 2026.

If I Were You 3 is the first Brazilian film to be released under the revived Buena Vista International label, after The Walt Disney Company retired the Star brand name in favor to the Hulu brand name as well the first film to not be produced by Star Original Productions as it was absorbed by the second incarnation of Buena Vista International LA/Brasil, also the first franchise film to not be released by 20th Century Studios as Disney absorbed 20th Century's Latin American and Brazilian branches to their own distribution branches after the Disney's acquisition of 21st Century Fox on March 20, 2019.

== Plot ==
Two decades after the events of the second film, Claudius and Helena are living a new chapter in their lives with their daughter Bia, now an adult and married to Achilles. However, the improbable happens: lightning strikes for the third time, presenting a new challenge that will test them all.

== Cast ==
- Glória Pires as Helena
- Tony Ramos as Claudio
- Cleo Pires as Bia
- Rafael Infante as Aquiles
- Valentina Daniel
- Paulo Rocha
- Yohama Eshima
- Dan Ferreira
- Rosi Campos
- Fernanda Schneider
