= É Proibido Fumar (film) =

2009 film directed by Anna Muylaert

- Directed by: Anna Muylaert
- Written by: Anna Muylaert
- Starring: Glória Pires; Paulo Miklos; Marisa Orth
- Cinematography: Jacob Solitrenick
- Edited by: Paulo Sacramento
- Music by: Marcio Nigro
- Production companies: Africa Filmes; Dezenove Som e Imagem
- Distributed by: PlayArte Filmes
- Release date: 4 December 2009 (Brazil)
- Running time: 89 minutes
- Country: Brazil
- Language: Portuguese

É Proibido Fumar (English: Smoke Gets in Your Eyes) is a 2009 Brazilian film written and directed by Anna Muylaert. It stars Glória Pires and Paulo Miklos.

== Cast ==
- Glória Pires ... Baby
- Paulo Miklos ... Max
- Alessandra Colassanti ... Stellinha
- Dani Nefussi ... Teca
- Marisa Orth ... Pop
- Paula Pretta ... Vanilda
- Henrique Silveira ... Lito
- Lili Angel ... Dona Guida
- Antônio Edson ... Seu Chico
- Antonio Abujamra ... Pepe
- Lourenço Mutarelli ... Corretor
- Pitty ... Mikaela - Cliente Corretor
- Lucas Machado Candeias ... Paulinho
- Emerson Danesi ... Suzuki
- Roberto Andreoli ... Johnny Marley

== Awards ==
2009: Brasília Film Festival

1. Best Film (won)
2. Best Actor (Paulo Miklos) (won)
3. Best Actress (Glória Pires) (won)
4. Best Supporting Actress (Dani Nefussi) (won)
5. Best Art Direction (Ana Mara Abreu) (won)
6. Best Editing (Paulo Sacramento) (won)
7. Best Music (Marcio Nigro) (won)
8. Best Screenplay (Anna Muylaert) (won)

2010: Cinema Brazil Grand Prize

1. Best Picture (won)
2. Best Director (Anna Muylaert) (won)
3. Best Screenplay, Original (Anna Muylaert) (won)
4. Best Editing - Fiction (Paulo Sacramento) (won)
5. Best Music (Marcio Nigro) (won)

2010: São Paulo Association of Art Critics Awards

1. Best Actress (Glória Pires) (won)
2. Best Director (Anna Muylaert) (won)
