= Antônio Fagundes =

Brazilian actor (born 1949)

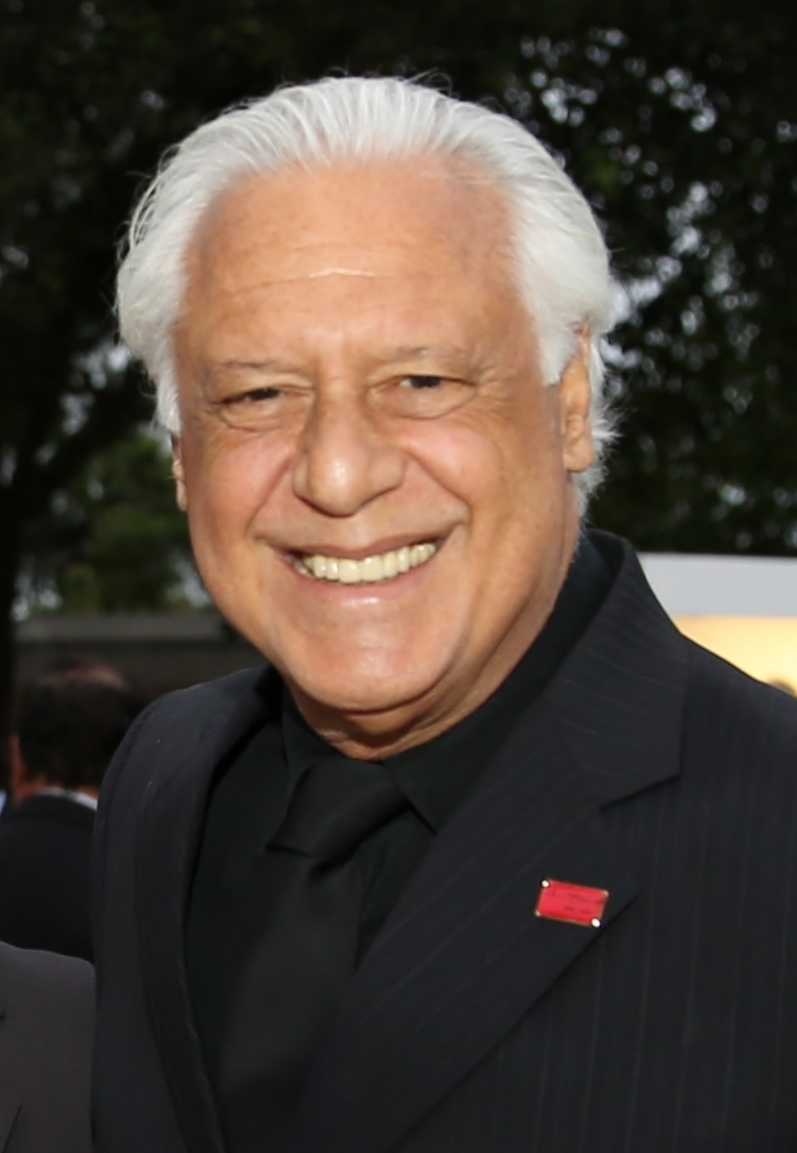
- Fagundes in July 2012
- Born: 18 April 1949 (age 77); Rio de Janeiro, Brazil
- Occupations: Actor, playwright, voice actor, producer
- Years active: 1965–present
- Spouses: Clarisse Abujamra (m. 1973; div. 1988) Mara Carvalho (m. 1988; div. 2000) Alexandra Martins (m. 2016)
- Children: 4 (including Bruno)

Antônio José da Silva Fagundes Filho (born 18 April 1949) is a Brazilian actor, playwright, voice actor, and producer. Renowned for his several performances in stage, film and television, where he frequently works in telenovelas.

== Biography ==
Fagundes was born in the city of Rio de Janeiro but moved with his parents to São Paulo at the age of eight and has lived there for over 30 years. He discovered his gift for the theater from the setting of stage plays made in the Rio Branco School, where he studied. He debuted on television in 1969 on the soap opera Nenhum Homem é Deus, at TV Tupi. Fagundes began on Rede Globo in 1976, on the telenovela Saramandaia. He also served for several years as protagonist of the series Carga Pesada, from 1979 to 1981, and from 2003 to 2007. The actor has four children: one (Bruno Fagundes), with his ex-wife Mara Carvalho, the other three (Dinah Abujamra Fagundes, Antonio Fagundes Neto and Diana Fagundes Abujamra), fruits of his 15-year marriage to actress Clarisse Abujamra.

== Career ==
=== Television ===
Year	Title	Role
1968	Antonio Maria	Pedro
1969	Nenhum Homem é Deus	Netinho
1972	Bel-Ami	Cadu
1972	A Revolta dos Anjos	Vítor
1973	Mulheres de Areia	Alaor
1974	O Machão	Julião Petruchio
1976	Saramandaia	Lua Viana
1977	Nina	Bruno di Fiori
1978	Dancin' Days	Carlos Eduardo Cardoso (Cacá)
1978	Caso Especial: Jorge, um Brasileiro	Jorge
1979–81	Carga Pesada	Pedro Alves Gomes Melo Vargas de Carvalho Silva
1981	É Proibido Colar	Himself
1981	Amizade Colorida	Eduardo Lusceno (Edu)
1982	Avenida Paulista	Alexandre Torres Xavier (Alex)
1982	Caso Verdade: Filhos da Esperança	Jasper Palmer
1983	Champagne	João Maria
1983	Louco Amor	Jorge Augusto
1984	Corpo a Corpo	Osmar
1988–89	Vale Tudo	Ivan Meireles
1990	Rainha da Sucata	Caio Szimanski
1991	Mundo da Lua	Rogério Silva
1991	O Dono do Mundo	Felipe Barreto
1992	Você Decide	
1993	Renascer	José Inocêncio
1994	A Viagem	Dr. Otávio César Jordão
1995	Engraçadinha: Seus Amores e Seus Pecados	Dr. Bergamini
1995	A Comédia da Vida Privada	Beto
1995	A Próxima Vítima	Astrogildo
1996–97	O Rei do Gado	Bruno Mezenga / Antônio Mezenga
1997–98	Por Amor	Atílio
1998	Labirinto	Ricardo Velasco
1999	Terra Nostra	Gumercindo Telles de Aranha
2001	Porto dos Milagres	Félix Guerrero / Bartolomeu Guerrero
2002	Esperança	Giuliano
2002	Brava Gente	José
2002	Vale todo	Salvador
2003–07	Carga Pesada	Pedro da Boléia
2005	Mad Maria	Ministro Juvenal de Castro
2007	Duas Caras	Juvenal Antena
2008	Negócio da China	Ernesto Dumas
2010	Tempos Modernos	Leal Cordeiro
2010	As Cariocas	Oscar (Cacá)
2011	Insensato Coração	Raul Brandão
2012	Gabriela	Coronel Ramiro
2013–14	Amor à Vida	Cesar Khoury Bastos
2014	Meu Pedacinho de Chão	Giácomo Brunneto
2016	Velho Chico	Afrânio de Sá Ribeiro
2017	Dois Irmãos	Halim
2019–2020	Bom Sucesso	Alberto Prado Monteiro
2022	IndependênciaS	Dom João VI
2025	Ângela Diniz: Assassinada e Condenada	Evandro Lins e Silva
2026	Quem Ama Cuida	Arthur Brandão

=== Stage ===
- 1964 - A ceia dos cardeais
- 1966 - Atlantic's queen
- 1969 - Hair (musical), by Gerome Ragni and James Rado
- 1969 - "O Cão Siamês"
- Arena canta Tiradentes, by Augusto Boal and Gianfrancesco Guarnieri
- Feira paulista de opinião
- A resistível ascensão de Arturo Ui
- Castro Alves pede passagem
- 1975 - "Muro de Arrimo", Antonio Abujamra
- 1980 - Pelo telefone
- 1981 - "O Homem Elefante", de Bernard Pomerance
- 1982 - "Morte Acidental de um Anarquista", by Dario Fo
- 1983 - "Xandu Quaresma", de Chico de Assis
- 1985 - Cyrano de Bergerac, by Edmond Rostand, direction of Flavio Rangel
- 1986 - Carmen com filtro, direção de Gerald Thomas
- 1988 - Fragmentos de um discurso amoroso, de Roland Brthes, direction de Ulisses Cruz
- 1989 - "O País dos Elefantes", de Louis Charles Sirjacq
- 1990 - "Muro de Arrimo"
- 1990 - "História do Soldado", de Gerome Ragni e James Rado
- 1992 - Macbeth
- 1994 - Vida privada, de Mara Carvalho
- 1996 - Oleanna, by David Mamet
- 1999 - Últimas luas, by Furio Bordon, direction of Jorge Takla
- 2002 - Sete minutos, of his authorship, direction of Bibi Ferreira
- 2005 - As Mulheres da Minha Vida
- 2008 - Restos
- 2012 - " Vermelho ", by John Logan, direction of Jorge Takla (w/Bruno Fagundes)

=== Film ===
- 1967 - Sandra, Sandra
- 1969 - A Compadecida
- 1971 - Eterna Esperança
- 1975 - A Noite das Fêmeas
- 1975 - Eu Faço... Elas Sentem
- 1976 - Elas São do Baralho
- 1977 - Vida Vida
- 1978 - A Noite dos Duros
- 1978 - Doramundo
- 1979 - O Menino Arco-Íris ... proprietário do casebre
- 1979 - Gaijin: Roads to Freedom
- 1980 - Os Sete Gatinhos
- 1981 - Pra Frente, Brasil
- 1982 - Tchau, Amor
- 1982 - As Aventuras de Mário Fofoca
- 1982 - Heart and Guts
- 1982 - Carícias Eróticas
- 1983 - A Próxima Vítima
- 1983 - O Menino Arco-Íris
- 1985 - Jogo Duro
- 1986 - Besame Mucho
- 1986 - Night Angels
- 1987 - Eternamente Pagú
- 1987 - The Lady from the Shanghai Cinema
- 1987 - Leila Diniz
- 1988 - Barbosa
- 1989 - O Corpo
- 1992 - Beijo 2348/72
- 1993 - Era Uma Vez no Tibet
- 1996 - Doces Poderes
- 1998 - Uma História de Futebol
- 1998 - Fica Comigo
- 1999 - No Coração dos Deuses
- 1999 - O Tronco
- 1999 - Paixão Perdida
- 2000 - The Grinch (voice acting)
- 2000 - Bossa Nova
- 2000 - Villa-Lobos: A Life of Passion
- 2003 - Sete Minutos
- 2003 - God Is Brazilian
- 2004 - A Dona da História
- 2005 - March of the Penguins (voice acting)
- 2005 - Achados e Perdidos
- 2013 - Quando Eu Era Vivo
- 2014 - Alemão
- 2025 - MMA - Meu Melhor Amigo - Fred Fontana

=== Awards and nominations ===
- 1985 - Molière Award, best drama actor for Cyrano de Bergerac.
- 1988 - Rio Cine Festival, Best Actor (film) by The Lady from the Shanghai Cinema
- 1988 - Molière Award, best drama actor for Fragments of a Loving Speech.
- 1991 - Press Trophy, best TV actor for The World Owner.
- 1992 - Festival Internacional del Cine (Cartagena de las Indias), best film actor for The Body.
- 1993 - APCA Trophy, best TV actor for Renascer.
- 1993 - Press Trophy, best TV actor for Renascer.
- 1997 - Contigo Award! - Best TV actor for For Love '.
- 1999 - Award of the Culture House in Rome theater
- 1999 - Brazil Quality Award, Best Actor of theater and television for the body of work.
- 1999 - APCA Trophy, best drama actor for Latest Luas.
- 2000 - Trophy Super Cap de Ouro, TV Terra Nostra.
- 2001 - Quality Award Brazil, RJ - best TV actor for Porto dos Milagres.
- 2001 - Quality Award Brazil, SP - best TV actor for Porto dos Milagres.
- 2001 - Best of the Year, Domingão Faustão - best TV actor for Porto dos Milagres.
- 2001 - Contigo Award! - Best TV actor for Porto dos Milagres.
- 2008 - Quality Award Brazil - best TV actor for Two Face.
- 2008 - Trophy Super Cap de Ouro, TV Two Faces.
- 2012 - Award Applause Brazil Theatre - Best Actor for "Red"
