= Marina Elali =

Brazilian singer (born 1982)

Marina de Souza Dantas Elali
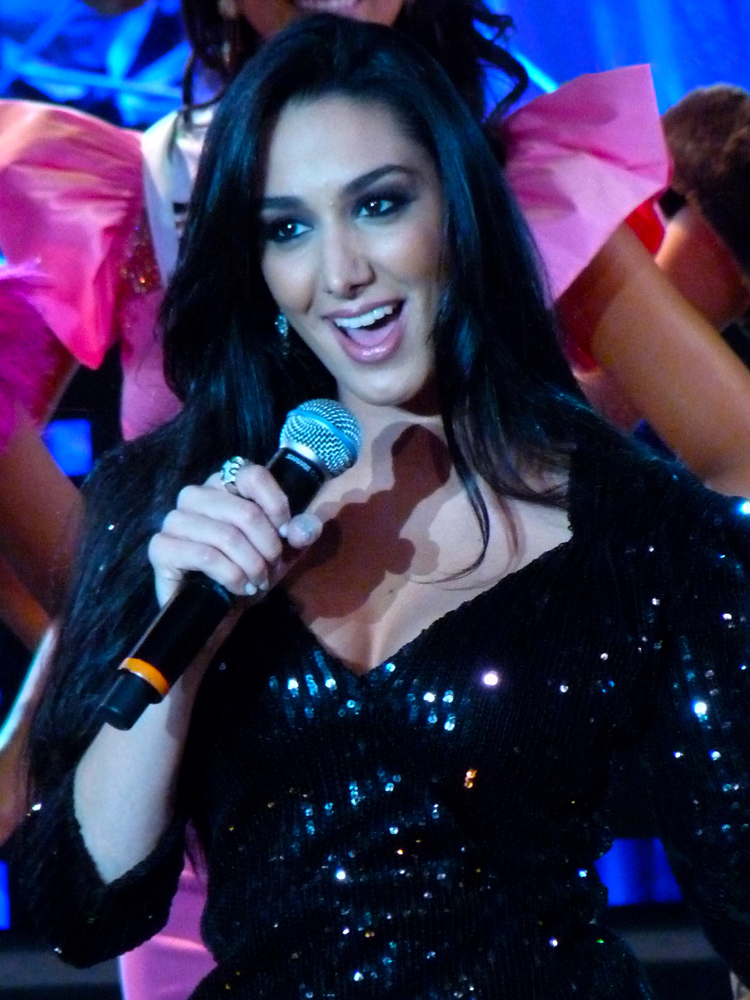
- Marina Elali in 2010
- Born: April 6, 1982 (age 44); Natal, Brazil
- Occupation: Singer

Marina de Souza Dantas Elali (born 6 April 1982, Natal, Brazil) is a Brazilian singer. She first became known after appearing in a talent competition show, Globo Television show FAMA, in 2004. She released her debut self-titled album in 2005.

== Discography ==
=== Albums ===
| Year | Album details | Peak positions | |
| Year | Album details | BRA | ABPD |
|---|---|---|---|
| 2005 | Marina Elali: Released: April 8, 2005; Label: Som Livre | 1 | 1 |
| 2007 | De Corpo e Alma Outra Vez: Released: November 9, 2007; Label: Som Livre | 3 | 2 |
| 2009 | Longe ou Perto: Released: September 21, 2009; Label: Som Livre | 9 | 7 |
| 2013 | Duetos: Released: December 10, 2013; Label: Som Livre | — | — |

=== Collected ===
| Year | Album details | Peak positions | |
| Year | Album details | BRA | ABPD |
|---|---|---|---|
| 2015 | Marina Elali - Novelas: Released: March 25, 2015; Label: Som Livre | 55 | — |

=== DVDs ===
| Year | Album details | Peak positions | |
| Year | Album details | BRA | ABPD |
|---|---|---|---|
| 2009 | Longe ou Perto: Released: September 21, 2009; Label: Som Livre | 9 | 7 |
| 2013 | Duetos: Released: December 10, 2013; Label: Som Livre | — | — |

=== Singles ===
List of singles, with selected chart positions and certifications
| Year | Title | Peak chart positions | Album |
| Year | Title | BRA | Album |
|---|---|---|---|
| 2005 | "Você" | 44 | Marina Elali |
| 2006 | "Mulheres Gostam" | 37 | Marina Elali |
| 2006 | "One Last Cry" | 1 | Marina Elali |
| 2007 | "Sábia" | 84 | Marina Elali |
| 2007 | "Eu Vou Seguir" | 1 | De Corpo e Alma Outra Vez |
| 2008 | "All She Wants" | 29 | De Corpo e Alma Outra Vez |
| 2009 | "Lost Inside Your Heart" (ft. Jon Secada) | 21 | Longe ou Perto |
| 2010 | "Talvez" | 72 | Longe ou Perto |
| 2010 | "Happy" | 45 | Araguaia |
| 2013 | "Vem Morena" | 60 | Duetos |
| 2014 | "Encontrei" | 22 | Marina Elali - Novelas |
| 2018 | "Olha a Sorte" | — | —N/a |
| 2018 | "Olha Pra Mim" | — | —N/a |
| 2019 | "Faz Tempo" | — | —N/a |
| 2020 | "Vai" | — | —N/a |
| 2020 | "Quem Ama" | — | —N/a |

=== Promotional Singles ===
| Year | Title | Album |
|---|---|---|
| 2007 | "Hipnotizar Você" | Marina Elali |
| 2010 | "Vem Dançar" | Longe ou Perto |
| 2010 | "Conselhos" | Longe ou Perto |
| 2017 | "O Que a Gente faz Agora" | Tempo de Amar |
