= Dancin' Days (1978 TV series) =

- Genre: Telenovela; Drama; Romance
- Created by: Gilberto Braga
- Directed by: Daniel Filho; Gonzaga Blota; Dennis Carvalho
- Starring: Sônia Braga; Joana Fomm; Antônio Fagundes; Pepita Rodrigues; Milton Moraes; Sura Berditchevsky; Lídia Brondi; Glória Pires; Lauro Corona; Reginaldo Faria; Cláudio Corrêa e Castro; Yara Amaral; Mário Lago; Ary Fontoura; Jacqueline Laurence; Neusa Borges; José Lewgoy; Beatriz Segall
- Opening theme: "Dancin' Days" - As Frenéticas
- Country of origin: Brazil
- Original language: Portuguese
- No. of episodes: 173

Production
- Running time: 50 minutes

Original release
- Network: TV Globo
- Release: 10 July 1978 – 26 January 1979

Related
- Dancin' Days (2012)

Dancin' Days is a Brazilian telenovela produced and broadcast by TV Globo. It premiered on 10 July 1978 and ended on 26 January 1979, with a total of 173 episodes. It was the twenty first "novela das oito" to be aired on the timeslot. It was created and written by Gilberto Braga and directed by Daniel Filho and Dennis Carvalho.

A Portuguese remake of the series was broadcast in 2012-13.

== Cast ==
Actor	Character
Sônia Braga	Júlia de Souza Matos
Joana Fomm	Yolanda de Souza Matos Pratini
Antônio Fagundes	Carlos Eduardo Souza Prado Cardoso (Cacá)
Reginaldo Faria	Hélio
Pepita Rodrigues	Carmem Lúcia Santos (Carminha)
Cláudio Corrêa e Castro	Franklin Prado Cardoso
José Lewgoy	Horácio Pratini
Yara Amaral	Áurea Santos
Beatriz Segall	Celina Souza Prado Cardoso
Milton Moraes	Jofre da Silva Maia
Ary Fontoura	Ubirajara Martins Franco
Lídia Brondi	Vera Lúcia (Verinha)
Glória Pires	Marisa de Souza Matos
Lauro Corona	Paulo Roberto Souza Prado Cardoso (Beto)
Sura Berditchevsky	Inês Santos Fragoso
Eduardo Tornaghi	Raul de Castro Mello
Gracinda Freire	Alzira da Silva Maia Neves
Ivan Cândido	Aníbal Fragoso
Cleyde Blota	Emília de Castro Mello
Jacqueline Laurence	Solange Rocha
Mauro Mendonça	Arthur Meireles Steiner
Regina Vianna	Neide
Mário Lago	Alberico Santos
Lourdes Mayer	Ester Santos
Chica Xavier	Marlene
Renato Pedrosa	Everaldo
Mira Palheta	Bibi Nascimento Leal
Neusa Borges	Madalena de Jesus (Madá)
Roberto de Cleto	Dr. Sílvio Müller
Maria Lúcia Dahl	Maria Lúcia de Andrade
Diana Morel	Anita
Clemente Viscaíno	China
Selma Lopes	Jandira
Marina Miranda	Edwiges (Divige)
Osmar de Mattos	Ricardo
Suzana Queiroz	Leila
Rejane Schumann	Luciana
Hildegard Angel	Herself

== International broadcast ==
The series was shown internationally, including in Portugal in 1979, Chile and Argentina in 1982, in the United States in 1984, France in 1985, the United Kingdom in 1986, and in Poland in 1987.
