= Tony Ramos =

Brazilian actor

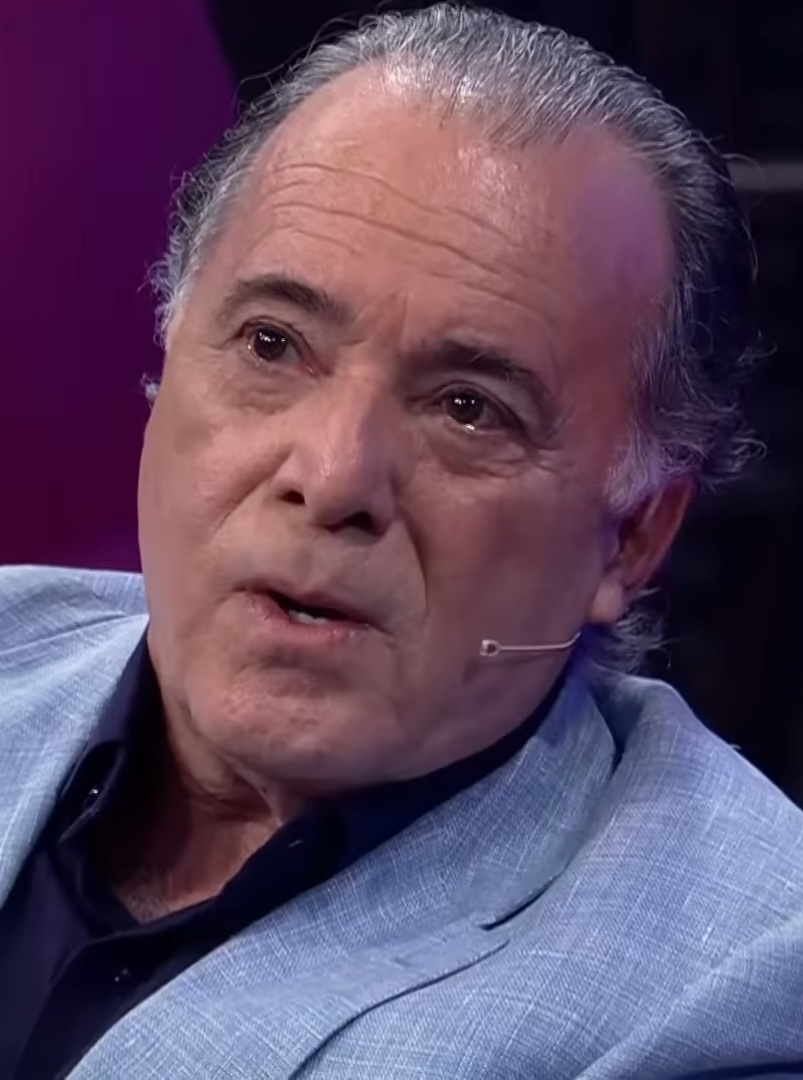
- Ramos in 2022
- Born: Antônio de Carvalho Barbosa; 25 August 1948 (age 78); Arapongas, Paraná, Brazil
- Education: University of São Paulo
- Occupation: Actor
- Years active: 1965–present
- Spouse: Lidiane Celi Minati (m. 1969)
- Children: 2

Antônio de Carvalho Barbosa (born 25 August 1948), known professionally as Tony Ramos, is a Brazilian actor.

Ramos has played leading roles in major telenovela productions for more than four decades. Many of his most famous roles share the characteristics of honesty and morality. Many of Ramos' more recent starring roles in novelas have cast him playing non-Brazilians, including the Greek Nikos in Belíssima (2005), the American Percival Farquhar in Mad Maria (2005), the Indian Opash in Caminho das Índias (2009), and the Italian Antonio Mattoli in Passione (2010). Ramos is fluent in English, French and Spanish, and has some knowledge of Italian. Ramos' acting process does not involve internalizing the character's emotions; instead, he creates his characters using external technique.

== Biography ==
Ramos was born in Arapongas, Paraná, the son of Maria Antonia Barbosa, a teacher. He spent his youth in the city of Avaré, in the country side of the Brazilian state São Paulo. Since he was a child, he expressed interest in acting and theater, drawing inspiration from Oscarito's films. Already in São Paulo, he made amateur theater while participating in the Teatro Cultura de São Paulo, where he staged plays for children. He holds a degree in philosophy from the Faculty of Philosophy, Languages and Human Sciences, University of São Paulo.

== Career ==
Ramos is one of the most important actors in Brazil, especially known for his work in telenovelas. His use of an Anglicized first name was common at the time he began his acting career, and the name Ramos is the last name of a relative. Ramos was born in the country side of Paraná and spent his youth in Ourinhos in the country side of the state of São Paulo. As a boy, he dreamed of being an actor. When young Ramos watched the films of Oscarito (a Brazilian film comedian who made dozens of films in the 1940s, 1950s and 1960s), he wanted to be like him. Later, while living in São Paulo, he performed in amateur theater with the Teatro Cultura Artística de São Paulo (Theater of Artistic Culture of São Paulo). At 16 years old, he was part of the musical team “Tony e Tom & Jerry” that made an appearance on the TV show Jovem Guarda (Young Guard).

In 1964, he made his debut as an actor on television, appearing in skits on the program Novos em Foco (Youth in Focus), on the channel TV Tupi. The show served as a testing ground for rising young actors, and after signing with TV Tupi, he participated in TV de Vanguarda (TV of the Vanguard), TV de Comédia (Comedy TV) and Grande Teatro Tupi (Tupi Great Theater). In 1965, Ramos appeared in his first novela, A Outra. (The Other).

While at TV Tupi, he appeared in various other productions, among them: Antônio Maria (1968) the novela that gave his career a major boost; Simplesmente Maria (Simply Maria, 1970), in which he played his first major role (Toninho); Vitória Bonelli (1972), as co-star with Tiago Bonelli; Rosa dos Ventos (Rose of the Winds, 1973), his first role as male lead in a novela (Quico); Ídolo de Pano (Idol of Rags, 1974), as the protagonist Luciano; and A Viagem (The Voyage, 1975), as the co-lead Téo.

In 1977, Ramos moved to Rede Globo (the TV network Globo), at the same time moving to Rio de Janeiro. At Rede Globo, he consolidated his success. His first performance for the network was in the novela Espelho Mágico (Magic Mirror). In the same year, he shared duties as host of the musical program Globo de Ouro (Globe of Gold) with the actress Christiane Torloni. By the end of the year he was starring in the novela O Astro (The Star), in which he took his first lead role at Rede Globo. During the novela, Ramos appeared in the first male nude scene in Brazilian novelas, despite the censorship of the military dictatorship in power at the time.

In 1979, he starred in the novela Pai Herói (Hero Dad). Afterwards, he joined the cast of the novela Chega Mais (More Comes) in the role of the grifter Tom, who despite the dubious nature of the character was the protagonist of the novela, beside Gelly, played by Sônia Braga. In 1981, he acted for the first time in a novela written by Manoel Carlos, playing the twins João Victor and Quinzinho in the novela Baila Comigo (Dance with Me). His performance, in which he distinguished the two characters without resort to makeup, using techniques of voice and posture to define the characters, was acclaimed by the critics. Later, he co-starred in the novela Sol de Verão (Summer Sun), in a sensitive portrayal of the deaf-mute Abel. In the novela Champagne, he played the son of a humble waiter, who had to fight to prove his father innocent of a false accusation of murder.

He began a sequence of lead roles in novelas, among them the mysterious Pardel in the novela Livre para Voar (Free to Fly), the hitman Riobaldo in the historical novela Grande Sertão: Veredas (Tracks in the Great Wilderness), the ambitious Cristiano in the remake of Selva de Pedra (Jungle of Stone), the muddled taxidriver Tonico in Bebê a Bordo (Baby on Board), the engineer Jorge in the miniseries O Primo Basílio (Cousin Basílio), the bankrupt millionaire Edu in Rainha da Sucata (Queen of Trash), the biologist João in the miniseries O Sorriso do Lagarto (The Lizard’s Smile), and the lawyer Álvaro in Felicidade (Happiness).

In 1993, he hosted some episodes of Você Decide (You Decide) while also participating in the novela Olho no Olho (Eye to Eye), in the role of Father Guido, who leaves the priesthood to fight a crime syndicate. In 1994, he participated in the pilot of the series A Comédia da Vida Privada (The Comedy of Private Life). In 1995, he starred in the novela A Próxima Vítima (The Next Victim). The next year he returned to host Você Decide, in addition to joining the regular cast of the series A Vida Como Ela É (A life Like This Is) and starred in the novela Anjo de Mim (My Angel).

In 1998, he was featured as one of the principal characters of the novela Torre de Babel (Tower of Babel) as the ex-con Clementino, who begins the novela in prison for having murdered his wife after discovering that she was cheating on him, and who afterwards rehabilitates himself with the help of a new love. Next, he played the romantic bookseller Miguel in Laços de Família (Family Ties). In As Filhas da Mãe (Mother’s Children) he played the Spaniard Manolo Gutierrez, owner of a casino.

In 2003, he played the musician Teo in the novela Mulheres Apaixonadas (Women in Love). Next, he co-starred in the remake of Cabocla (Mestiza), as Colonel Boanerges, and in 2005 worked in the miniseries Mad Maria, as the American impresario Percival Farquhar, and in the novela Belíssima (Beautiful), in which he played the Greek Nikos.

In 2007, he played impresario Antenor Cavalcanti in the novela Paraíso Tropical (Tropical Paradise), a complex character of soaring ambition who cannot bring himself to become a villain. In 2009, he was in the featured cast of the award-winning novela Caminho das Índias (The Way of India; also known as India – A Love Story), as the Indian Opash Ananda. In 2010, he starred as the Italian farmer Totó in the novela Passione (Passion), a role in which he blended Italian vocabulary into his speech for additional verisimilitude. The creator of the novela, Silvio de Abreu, wrote the role especially for him. In 2012 he appeared in a brief but pivotal role in the novela Avenida Brasil.

In addition to novelas, Ramos acted in more than 80 television movies and more than twenty plays. His debut in the theater came in 1969, with the play Quando as Máquinas Param (When the Machines Stop), with Walderez de Barros. In the same year he appeared in Rapazes da Banda (The Boys in the Band) and in 1971, he appeared in Pequenos Assassinatos (Little Victims). In 1989 he appeared in the musical Meu Refrão Olê Olá (My Refrain Olê Olá), in homage to the 25 year career of the songwriter Chico Buarque, in which he played the transvestite Geni, and in 1997 he acted in the play Cenas de um Casamento (Scenes from a Wedding) in which he played opposite Regina Braga. Finally, in 2002 he played an ex-torturer police officer in the play Novas Diretrizes em Tempos de Paz (New Directors in Times of Peace).

Ramos starred in the movie O Pequeno Mundo de Marcos (The Little World of Marcos) in 1968. Among other film productions, he acted in Leila Diniz, as the father of the title role actress. He won the best actor award at the Festival de Gramado for his role in Bufo & Spallanzani. One of his great box-office successes was Se Eu Fosse Você (If I Were You) e Se Eu Fosse Você 2.

On May 7, 2009, Ramos received the medal of the Ordem de Rio Branco (Order of Rio Branco) from the Ministry of Foreign Relations in recognition of his work in cinema, theater, and television. The award ceremony took place at the Palácio do Itamaraty (Itamaraty Palace), in Brasília, in which Brazilian president Luiz Inácio Lula da Silva (Lula) the first lady Marisa Letícia, and the minister for Foreign Relations Celso Amorim participated.

== Personal life ==
Ramos is considered by his professional colleagues to be a person of integrity and good humor. In addition, he has one of the most stable marriages in the artistic community of Brazil: he married his wife Lidiane Barbosa in 1969. They have two children: Rodrigo, a doctor, and Andréa, a lawyer. Ramos is a practising Roman Catholic. He is a São Paulo FC fan.

== Filmography ==
=== Television ===
Year	Title	Role	Notes
1965	A Outra	Vevé	
1966	O Amor Tem Cara de Mulher		
1967	Os Rebeldes	Frank Sobrinho	
1968	Os Amores de Bob	Bob	
1968	Antônio Maria	Gustavo	
1969	Nino, o Italianinho	Rubinho	
1970	Simplesmente Maria	Toninho	
1970	As Bruxas	Tito	
1971	Hospital	Luís Carlos	
1972	A Revolta dos Anjos		
1972	Na Idade do Lobo		
1972	Vitória Bonelli	Tiago Bonelli	
1973	Rosa dos Ventos	Quico	
1974	Ídolo de Pano	Luciano	
1974	Os Inocentes	Marcelo	
1975	A Viagem	Téo	
1976	O Julgamento	Lico	
1976	Ano Internacional da Criança	Presenter	
1977	Espelho Mágico	Paulo Morel/Cristiano	
1977	O Astro	Márcio Hayala	
1978	Caso Especial		Episode: "O Caminho das Pedras Verdes"
1979	Pai Herói	André Cajarana	
1980	Chega Mais	Tom	
1981	Show do Mês	Presenter	
1981	Baila Comigo	João Victor Gama/Quinzinho	
1982	Caso Verdade		Episode: "O Menino do Olho Azul"
1982	Elas por Elas		
1982	Sol de Verão	Abel	
1983	Champagne	Nil	
1984	Livre para Voar	Pardal	
1985	Grande Sertão: Veredas	Riobaldo	
1986	Selva de Pedra	Cristiano Vilhena	
1988	O Primo Basílio	Jorge Carvalho	
1988	Bebê a Bordo	Tonico Ladeira	
1990	Boca do Lixo		
1990	Rainha da Sucata	Edu	
1991	O Sorriso do Lagarto	João Pedroso	
1991	Felicidade	Álvaro Peixoto	
1993	Você Decide	Presenter	
1993	O Mapa da Mina	Jorge Flores	
1993	Olho no Olho	Padre Guido	
1995	A Próxima Vítima	Juca Mestieri	
1995	Não Fuja da Raia		
1996	Você Decide	Presenter	
1996	Anjo de Mim	Floriano Ferraz	
1996	A Vida como Ela É	Various characters	
1998	Você Decide		Episode: "Desencontro"
1998	Torre de Babel	José Clementino da Silva	
1999	Sai de Baixo		Episode: "Novela da Vida Privada"
2000	Laços de Família	Miguel Soriano	
2001	Sítio do Picapau Amarelo		Episode: "A Festa da Cuca"
2001	As Filhas da Mãe	Manolo Gutiérrez	
2002	O Clone	Maysa's Boyfriend	Special participation
2003	Mulheres Apaixonadas	Teófilo "Téo" Ribeiro Alves	
2004	Cabocla	Coronel Boanerges de Sousa Pereira	
2005	Mad Maria	Percival Farquhar	
2005	Belíssima	Nikolaos "Nikos" Petrákis	
2007	Paraíso Tropical	Antenor Cavalcanti	
2008	Faça Sua História	Passenger	Episode: "Robauto S.A."
2009	India – A Love Story	Opash Ananda	
2010	Passione	Antonio "Totó" Mattoli	
2011	Chico Xavier	Orlando	
2012	Avenida Brasil	Genésio	Special participation
2012	Guerra dos Sexos	Otávio de Alcântara Rodrigues e Silva (Otávio II/Bimbinho/Dominguinhos)	
2015	A Regra do Jogo	José Maria "Zé Maria" Pereira	
2016	A Lei do Amor	Senator Roberval Mendes	Special participation
2017	Tempo de Amar	José Augusto Correia Guedes	
2018	O Sétimo Guardião	Olavo Aragão Duarte	
2019	Verão 90	Figueirinha's voice	
2022	Sob Pressão	Arlindo	
2022	Encantado's	Madurão	
2023	Terra e Paixão	Antônio La Selva	
2025	The Masked Singer Brasil	Panelist	
2025	Dona de Mim	Abel Rubin Boaz	
2026	Quem Ama Cuida	Otoniel de Moraes	

=== Cinema ===
Year	Title	Role	Notes
1968	O Pequeno Mundo de Marcos	Tony	
1971	Diabólicos Herdeiros		
1976	Ninguém Segura Essas Mulheres	Gugu	
1984	Noites do Sertão	Miguel	
1987	Leila Diniz	Sr. Diniz	
1989	Minas-Texas		
1997	O Noviço Rebelde	Dr. Filipe	
1997	Pequeno Dicionário Amoroso	Barata	
2001	A Partilha		
2001	Bufo & Spallanzani	Guedes	
2002	Era Uma Vez... no Brasil		
2006	If I Were You	Cláudio/Helena	
2008	If I Were You 2	Cláudio/Helena	
2009	Peacetime	Segismundo	
2010	Chico Xavier	Orlando	
2014	Getúlio	Getúlio Vargas	
2023	They Shot the Piano Player	João	
2026	If I Were You 3	Claudio/Helena	

=== Theater ===
Title
Quando as máquinas Param
Rapazes da Banda
Pequenos Assassinatos
Meu Refrão: Olê, Olá
O Pagador de Promessas
A Morte e a Donzela
Cenas de um Casamento
Novas Diretrizes em Tempos de Paz
