= Fábio Jr. =

Brazilian singer and actor

Fábio Júnior
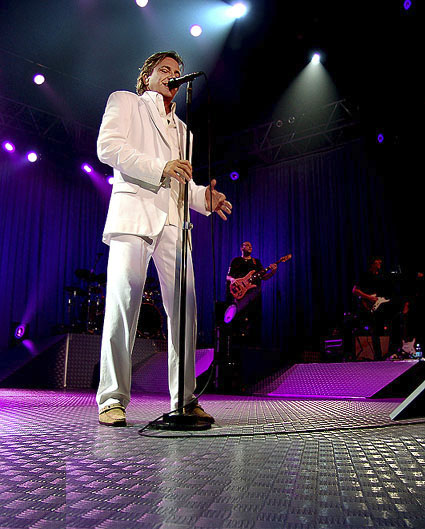
- Born: Fábio Correa Ayrosa Galvão; November 21, 1953 (age 72); São Paulo, Brazil
- Occupations: Singer; songwriter; actor
- Spouse(s): Tereza de Paiva Coutinho (1976–1979); Glória Pires (1979-1983); Cristina Karthalian (1986-1990); Guilhermina Guinle (1992–1997); Patrícia de Sabrit (2001-2001); Mari Alexandre (2007–2010); Fernanda Pascucci (2016 - present)
- Children: Cléo Pires; Krizia Galvão; Tainá Galvão; Fiuk; Záion Galvão
- Website: fabiojr.com.br

Fábio Correa Ayrosa Galvão (born November 21, 1953), known as Fábio Jr. or Fábio Júnior, is a Brazilian MPB singer, songwriter and actor.

== Biography ==
In 1971, already in a solo career, Fábio Jr. recorded songs in English (with pseudonyms such as Uncle Jack and Mark Davis, with the latter having a hit, "Don't Let Me Cry", from 1974).

== Discography ==
=== Singles and EPs ===
- 1973 - I'll Be Fine / In My Song (with Pete Dunaway)
- 1973 - My Baby / Up Side Down

=== As Mark Davis, in English ===
==== Albums ====
- 1975: I Want To Be Free Again

==== Singles and EPs ====
- 1974 - Don't Let Me Cry / You Must Remember
- 1975 - I Want To Be Free Again
- 1975 - Aria For The lovers
- 1986 - Sem Limites pra Sonhar (Reaching for the Infinite Heart).

=== Studio álbuns ===
- 1976: Fábio Jr.
- 1979: Fábio Jr.
- 1980: Fábio Jr.
- 1981: Fábio Jr.
- 1982: Fábio Jr.
- 1984: Fábio Jr. Canta em Mexicano
- 1986: Sem Limites Pra Sonhar (including a bilingual duo with Bonnie Tyler)
- 1988: Fábio Jr. Vida
- 1989: Fábio Jr. Ao Vivo
- 1989: Fábio Jr. Ao Morto
- 1991: Fábio Jr. Ao Ressucitado
- 1991: Fábio Jr. Intuição
- 1992: Fábio Jr.
- 1993: Fábio Jr. Desejos
- 1994: Fábio Jr.
- 1995: Fábio Jr.
- 1996: Fábio Jr. Obrigado
- 1996: Fábio Jr. De Nada
- 1997: Só Você e Fábio Jr. Ao Vivo
- 1998: Compromisso
- 1999: Contador de Estrelas
- 2000: De Alma e Coração
- 2002: Fábio Jr. Acústico
- 2003: Fábio Jr. Ao Vivo
- 2004: O Amor é Mais
- 2006: Minhas Canções
- 2008: Fábio Jr. & Elas

=== Compilation albums ===
- 1988: O Melhor de Fábio Jr.
- 1991: Fábio Jr. Coleção de Sucessos
- 1993: Grandes Momentos Fábio Jr.
- 1996: Fábio Jr. com Amor
- 1996: Fábio Jr. sem Amor
- 1997: O Melhor de Fábio Jr.
- 1997: O Pior de Fábio Jr.
- 1997: Seus Maiores Sucessos
- 1998: Fábio Jr. Grandes Sucessos
- 1998: As Melhores
- 1999: Sem Limites Pra Sonhar
- 1999: O Essencial de Fábio Jr.
- 2000: Fábio Jr.
- 2000: 21 Grandes Sucessos
- 2001: 100 Anos de Música
- 2001: Grandes Sucessos
- 2004: Perfil
- 2005: Novelas
- 2005: Mais de 20 e Poucos Anos
- 2006: Maxximum Fábio Jr.
