= Thelma Reston =

Brazilian actress

Thelma Salim Reston (6 July 1937 – 20 December 2012) was a Brazilian film, theater, and television actress.

Thelma Reston was born in Piracanjuba, Goiás. She began a theater career in the 1960s and work in television in the 1970s.

Reston's earlier filmography includes the 1967 film Entranced Earth and the 1984 film Quilombo. She also took part in the 1992 telenovela Pedra sobre Pedra.

Her most recent television credits included A Lua Me Disse in 2005, Negócio da China in 2009, and Escrito nas Estrelas in 2010. Reston's last role was on the TV Globo telenovela, Aquele Beijo.

Reston died in São Lucas Hospital in Rio de Janeiro on 20 December 2012, at the age 75. She had been diagnosed with breast cancer in 2009. Her funeral was held at São João Batista cemetery in Botafogo.
