= Nunes =

Nunes is a common Portuguese surname. Origin: Português patronymic (son of Nuno). The name itself is believed to be either of Latin "Nunnus, Nonnus", or crypto-Judaism. etymology. Some Sephardic Jews adopted this name.

== Notable people with the name ==
=== Business, arts, entertainment, and media ===
- Clara Nunes (1942–1983), Brazilian samba musician
- Deise Nunes (born 1968), Brazilian model and Miss Brazil 1986
- Emmanuel Nunes (1941–2012), Portuguese composer
- Julia Nunes (born 1989), American singer and songwriter
- José Maurício Nunes Garcia (1767–1830), Brazilian classical composer
- Lygia Bojunga Nunes (born 1932), Brazilian author of children's books
- Neil Nunes (born 1980), British continuity announcer
- Pedro Nunes (1502-1578), Portuguese mathematician, cosmographer, and professor
- Rachel Ann Nunes (born 1966), or Teyla Branton or Rachel Branton, or Mrs. Antonio Joao (TJ) Nunes, United States author of children's books
- Sara Nunes (born 1980), Finnish pop singer
- Vasco Nunes (1974–2016), Portuguese cinematographer, producer, and film director

=== Religion ===
- Emanuel Nunes Carvalho (1771–1817), United States rabbi and lexicographer
- Airas Nunes (c. 1230-1293), Spanish cleric and troubador
- José da Costa Nunes (1880–1976), Portuguese Catholic Cardinal, former Bishop of Macau and Patriarch of the East Indies

=== Sports ===
- Adão Nunes Dornelles (1923–1991), Brazilian footballer
- Agnaldo Nunes (born 1976), Brazilian boxer
- Alessandro Mori Nunes (born 1979), Brazilian footballer
- Alessandro Nunes (born 1982), Brazilian footballer
- Amanda Nunes (born 1988), Brazilian mixed martial artist
- André Nunes (born 1984), Brazilian footballer
- Diego Nunes (born 1986), Brazilian racing driver
- Diego Nunes (fighter) (born 1982), Brazilian mixed martial artist
- Eduardo Martins Nunes (born 1984), Brazilian footballer
- Emerson Pereira Nunes (born 1981), Brazilian footballer
- Erick Nunes (born 2004), Brazilian footballer
- Hugo Nunes Coelho (born 1980), Portuguese footballer
- João Batista Nunes (born 1954), Brazilian footballer
- Jorge Amado Nunes (born 1961), Paraguayan footballer
- José Carlos Araújo Nunes (born 1977), Portuguese footballer
- Josh Nunes (born 1990), Stanford football quarterback
- Karl Nunes (1894–1958), West Indian cricketer
- Laís Nunes (born 1992), Brazilian wrestler
- Paulo Jorge Carreira Nunes (born 1970), Portuguese footballer
- Paulo Nunes (born 1971), Brazilian footballer
- Ricardo Nunes, (born June 1986) South African footballer
- Tomané Nunes (born 1987), Portuguese footballer
- Valmir Nunes (born 1964), Brazilian ultramarathon runner
- Vinícius Alberto Nunes (born 1988), Brazilian footballer

=== Other fields ===
- Benedito Nunes (1929–2011), Brazilian philosopher and writer
- Claudio Nunes (born 1968), Italian bridge player
- Devin Nunes (born 1973), United States politician
- Expedita Ferreira Nunes (born 1932), only known child of Lampião and Maria Bonita
- Paloma Nunes (born 1997), Brazilian politician
- Pedro Nunes (1502-1578), 16th century mathematician
- Terezinha Nunes (born 1947), British-Brazilian clinical psychologist and academic
- Thamirys Nunes, Brazilian transgender rights activist

== See also ==
- Núñez, the Spanish version of the name
