= Perfumed Ball =

1996 film directed by Lírio Ferreira

- Theatrical release poster
- Directed by: Lírio Ferreira; Paulo Caldas
- Written by: Hilton Lacerda; Lírio Ferreira; Paulo Caldas
- Produced by: Aniceto Ferreira; Beto Monteiro
- Starring: Duda Mamberti; Luiz Carlos Vasconcelos; Aramis Trindade; Chico Diaz
- Cinematography: Paulo Jacinto dos Reis
- Edited by: Vânia Debs
- Music by: Paulo Rafael
- Production company: Saci Filmes
- Distributed by: RioFilme
- Release dates: 1996 (Festival de Brasília); July 26, 1997
- Running time: 93 minutes
- Country: Brazil
- Language: Portuguese
- Box office: R$326,879

Perfumed Ball (Portuguese: Baile Perfumado) is a 1996 Brazilian film directed by Lírio Ferreira and Paulo Caldas. Starring Duda Mamberti and Luiz Carlos Vasconcelos, it shows the history of how Benjamin Abrahão befriended Lampião, the leader of the Cangaço, and filmed his crimes — a feat the Brazilian army was not able to accomplish. It used footage taken in 1936 for Abrahão's 1959 film Lampião, o Rei do Cangaço.

== Cast ==
- Duda Mamberti as Benjamin Abrahão
- Luiz Carlos Vasconcelos as Lampião
- Aramis Trindade as lieutenant Lindalvo Rosas
- Chico Diaz as colonel Zé de Zito
- Joffre Soares as Padre Cícero
- Cláudio Mamberti as colonel João Libório
- Germano Haiut as Ademar Albuquerque
- Zuleica Ferreira as Maria Bonita

== Reception ==
The film entered the 1996 Festival de Brasília, where it won awards for Best Film, Best Newcomer Director, Best Art Direction (Adão Pinheiro), Best Supporting Actor (Aramis Trindade) and shared the Critic's Choice Award with Um Céu de Estrelas. It was released in Brazilian theatres on July 26, 1997. It was shown at the 1997 Cannes Film Festival, at the 1997 Toronto International Film Festival, at the 1998 Chicago Latino Film Festival, and won the Coral Prize for Best Film Poster at the 19th Havana Film Festival. The movie is considered an important mark in Pernambuco's cinema industry, being one of the Pernambuco's first films to be acclaimed by international critics. For example, Deborah Young of Variety said it "has a deliberately naive look that keeps it fresh, plus amusing dialogue and cast." She especially praised its "imaginative camera style" as it "uses a quasi-expressionist palette and camera angles".
