= Bárbara M. Brizuela =

American mathematics educator (born 1970)

- Occupation: Academic mathematics educator (Ed.D. in education from Harvard University)
- Employer: Tufts University
- Title: Professor and Dean of the School of Arts & Sciences, Tufts University
- Term: 2024-present

Bárbara M. Brizuela (born November 24, 1970) is a mathematics educator and a professor of education at Tufts University. She currently serves as dean of the Tufts University School of Arts and Sciences.

== Education and career ==
Brizuela was born in the United States but raised in Argentina, Ecuador and Venezuela. She has an EdD from Harvard University where she studied with Eleanor Duckworth. Prior to that, she received a Master of Arts, General Studies in Education, from Tufts and a Licenciada en Ciencias Pedagógicas and Licenciada en Psicopedagogía degrees from the Universidad de Belgrano. She was a Spencer Fellow at the Harvard Graduate School of Education from 1997 until 2000 and a Roy E. Larsen Fellow in 1996–1997.

In 2008, she received a Fulbright Fellowship.

Brizuela joined the faculty at Tufts in 2001 as assistant professor, was promoted to associate professor in 2007 and full professor in 2015. She was Tufts Department of Education Chair (2009–2012) and Director of the PhD and MS in STEM Education (2009–2014).

In November 2024, she was appointed dean of the Tufts School of Arts and Sciences after serving as interim dean since July following the departure of dean James M. Glaser. She previously served as Dean of the Graduate School of Arts and Sciences (2022–2024), as an Academic Dean (2014–2024) and an Associate Dean for Diversity and Inclusion.

== Research ==
Brizuela's main research focus is on mathematics education in early childhood and elementary school. She has been a Kindergarten and seventh grade teacher in Argentina as well as a Spencer Foundation research training grantee and a Fulbright Fellow. Her current research focuses on children's learning of elementary mathematics, including early algebra, children's learning of the notational number system and other notational aspects of mathematics, and mathematics teachers' learning and professional development. Since 1998, she has been involved in research on children's early algebraic reasoning, exploring the intertwined nature of arithmetic and algebra (see 'Early Algebra'). Her main areas of interest are mathematics education, early childhood education, and cognitive development. Her research is grounded on the fundamental belief that our primary goal as educators is to understand and highlight children's thinking and reasoning in productive ways.

== Family ==
Brizuela is married to Sebastian Martellotto and is the mother of two adult daughters.

== Books ==
In 2004, her book Mathematical Development in Young Children: Exploring Notations was published. This book was later translated into Portuguese.

In 2007, she published the book Bringing Out the Algebraic Character of Arithmetic: From Children’s Ideas to Classroom Practice with her colleagues Analúcia Schliemann and David Carraher. This book was later translated into Spanish. She is also the author of Haciendo números: Las notaciones númericas vistas desde la psicología, la didáctica la historia (Editorial Paidós Mexicana, 2006)

With Brian E. Gravel she edited Show Me What You Know: Exploring Student Representations Across STEM Disciplines (Teachers College Press, 2013).

== Recent journal articles ==
- Full list of publications.
- López, M. A., Ramírez-Uclés, R., Fuentes, S., & Brizuela, B. M. (2026). Understandings and generalizations of the commutative property of multiplication among elementary school students. Mathematical Thinking and Learning, 1–21. https://doi.org/10.1080/10986065.2026.2667969
- Raymond, S., Strachota, S., Brizuela, B. M., Blanton, M., & Savid, S. (2026). From mathematical micro- to macro-identities: How mathematical authority emerged from moment-to-moment positioning. International Journal of Education in Mathematics, Science and Technology (IJEMST), 14(2), 499-518. https://doi.org/10.46328/ijemst.5339
- Strachota, S., López, M. A., Brizuela, B. M., Gardiner, A. M., & Blanton, M. (2026). Tables to Graphs and Graphs to Tables. Mathematics Teacher: Learning & Teaching PK–12, 119(1), 21-28. https://doi.org/10.5951/MTLT.2025.0144
- Brizuela, B. M., Alvarado, M., & Strachota, S. (2025). Early elementary school children’s use of tables while solving additive problems. Recherches en Didactique des Mathématiques/Research in the Didactics of Mathematics, 44(2). https://hal.science/hal-04887086
- Narváez, R., Brizuela, B. M., & Cañadas, M. C. (2025). Justifications and mediations in the generalization process among fourth grade students. International Journal of Science and Mathematics Education. https://doi.org/10.1007/s10763-025-10574-7
- Ramírez Uclés, R., Fuentes, S., López, M. A., & Brizuela, B. M. (2025). Justificación de las propiedades distributiva y conmutativa del producto en primaria. Enseñanza de las Ciencias, 43(3), 125-143. https://doi.org/10.5565/rev/ensciencias.6334
- Anglada, L., Cañadas, M. C., Brizuela, B. M. (2024). Generalization among 5-year-olds in a Functional Context with Programmable Robots. International Journal of Science and Mathematics Education. https://doi.org/10.1007/s10763-024-10495-x
- Brizuela, B. M., & Strachota, S. (2024). When algebra makes you smile: Playful engagement with early algebraic practices. Learning & Instruction, 92, 101933. https://doi.org/10.1016/j.learninstruc.2024.101933
- Brizuela, B. M. (2024). Una mirada sobre el aprendizaje del álgebra en niños en niveles parvulario y básico desde los sistemas notacionales. Revista Chilena de Educación Matemática (RECHIEM), 16(1), 3-11. https://doi.org/10.46219/rechiem.v16i1.160
- López, M., & Brizuela, B. M. (2024). Las tablas como herramientas algebraicas. Uno, Revista de Didáctica de las Matemáticas, 106, 23-28.
- Ramirez, R., Brizuela, B. M., & Blanton, M. (2024). Kindergarten And First-Grade Students’ Understandings Of Arithmetic Properties. Canadian Journal of Science, Mathematics, and Technology Education. https://doi.org/10.1007/s42330-024-00331-3
- Strachota, S., Brizuela, B. M., Gibbins, A., Blanton, M., Gardiner, A. M., & Sawrey, K. (2023). First Graders’ Generalizations and Justifications of Even and Odd Numbers. Canadian Journal of Science, Mathematics, and Technology Education. https://doi.org/10.1007/s42330-023-00297-8
- Brizuela, B. M., Strachota, S., Raymond, S. Savid, S. & Blanton, M. (2023). “Tia was the right one:” Mathematical Authority and Trust Among First Graders. Mathematical Thinking and Learning. https://doi.org/10.1080/10986065.2023.2215408
- Brizuela, B. M. (2022). Editorial. Time passes/Editorial. El tiempo pasa. Journal for the Study of Education and Development/Infancia y Aprendizaje, 45(4), 715-724.
