= Expedita Ferreira =

Daughter of Lampião and Maria Bonita (born 1932)

Expedita Ferreira Nunes
- Expedita Ferreira talking about her childhood (2022)
- Born: September 13, 1932 (age 93); Porto da Folha
- Partner: Manoel Messias Nunes Neto
- Children: 4
- Parents: Lampião (father); Maria Bonita (mother)

Expedita Ferreira Nunes (Porto da Folha, 13 September 1932) is the only known child of Lampião and Maria Bonita.

== Biography ==
=== Life ===
Expedita is the daughter of the cangaceiros Lampião and Maria Bonita. Her parents were killed when she was 5 years old, and she was taken care of by their allies Manuel Severo and Aurora. She was discovered by a Children's Court judge when she was 10 and from there on she was raised by her uncle, João Ferreira. She lived on her grandmother's farm. As inheritance, she only received her father's lock of hair. In 1947, she married Manoel Messias Nunes Neto and moved to Aracaju. She became a housewife and had four children: Iza, Gleuse, Dejair and Vera. Her daughter Vera became a sociologist specialized on the history of Lampião.

Expedita's family did not talk about her father, and she only heard his story in 1969, when the writer Maria Matta Machado invited her to travel to São Paulo for the release of her book As Táticas de Guerra dos Cangaceiros (The Military Tactics of the Cangaceiros). There, she met the cangaceiros Sila, Sereno, Dadá, Balão and Pitombeira. Her father's surname Ferreira was only added to her birth certificate in 2016.

=== DNA tests ===
Expedita is the only person recognized as a child of the couple. Some sources point out that João Ferreira Batista, known as João Peitudo, is also a child of Lampião. He was supposedly born in 1938 and was left 45 days later at Aurora da Conceição's house, where Lampião pierced his ears so he could recognize him later. But, according to historians, he was probably born in 1942 and his ears were pierced during the time he lived with indigenous people of Maranhão. According to Expedita, "he wanted to split the inheritance of my father -that I don't even know what it is- because he said we were rich and he was poor." Around 1992, she gave a DNA sample to compare it with João Peitudo's, but the results were inconclusive. In 1994, another test was done, where João Peitudo's DNA was compared with Lampião's sister Mocinha and a sister of Maria Bonita. Folha de S.Paulo has initially reported that the result was positive, but in 1996 the journal reported the result was indeed negative. João died on 27 July 2000 in Juazeiro do Norte.

In 1996, the photographer José Geraldo Aguiar asked Expedita to submit a DNA test to prove his hypothesis that Lampião and Maria Bonita have escaped the police ambush that officially killed them and moved to Minas Gerais, where he became a farmer named Antônio Maria da Conceição and Maria Bonita adopted the name of Maria Teixeira Lima. Expedita refused his request, saying that "[m]y father is a myth. What they want to do now is to destroy the image and the myth that this man was."

== Legal procedures ==
Expedita is the major shareholder of the company Lampião e Maria Bonita, that manages the image of the couple.

In 1987, Exedita sued Lloyds Bank for using the image of the couple in a magazine advertisement. The bank argued that copyright was paid to the photographer Benjamin Abrahão Botto, but in July 2001 the 4th Panel of Superior Court of Justice condemned the bank to indemnify Expedita.

In 2011, she sued a Pernambucan motel franchise for using the slogan "Maria Bonita, turn on my Lampião".

In 2022, she sued Netflix, Inc. for not consulting her during the production of Time Hustler.

In November 2023, she sued Tiago Pavinatto and Almedina Press for publishing the book Da Silva: A Grande Fake News da Esquerda (Da Silva: The Great Fake News from the Left). The book tries to associate Lampião with the president Luiz Inácio Lula da Silva and the Workers' Party (PT), and Pavinatto describes him as a "notorious historical rapist", "psychopath", a "mercenary terrorist", amongst other pejorative terms. She asked for R$ 245 thousand as indemnification, the removal of "excess of terms and adjectives that implies dishonored mentions to the image of Lampião" under the fine of R$ 500 a day, and that the next prints of the book must contain the following informative text: "for the readers to have the knowledge that the version articulated by the author and sold as reality finds no support on historical researches made up until now."

== Opinions ==
Expedita has denied that the Landless Workers' Movement (MST) is an inheritor of the social fight done by Lampião. According to Expedita, "[t]he landless workers are destroying everything in this life, as there are many around here that own stuff, sell it to become landless and fall into mayhem."

== Homages ==
On 8 March 2023, Expedita participated in Mais Você as part of the International Women's Day. On 11 May, she became honorary citizen of Aracaju, by the indication of the president of the Municipal Council Ricardo Vasconcelos (REDE). She was also the highlight of this year's Carnival by the samba-enredo of the samba school Imperatriz Leopoldinense and was part of the parade together with Mancha Verde. Mancha Verde didn't know about the existence of a child of Lampião, and Expedita's participation happened due to the initiative of her family. Her daughters also helped organize the event.
