= Minha Criança Trans =

Brazilian non-governmental organization

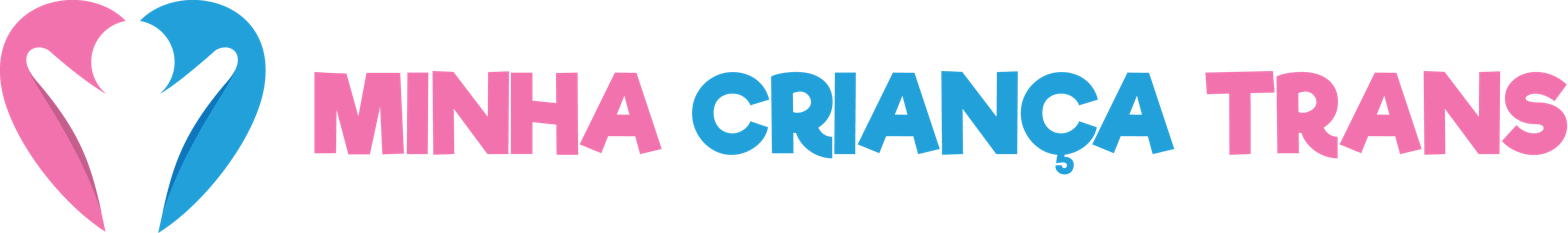
- Website: www.minhacriancatrans.com.br

Minha Criança Trans (lit. 'My Trans Child') is a Brazilian non-governmental organization (NGO) founded in 2022 by Thamirys Nunes in the city of Campinas. It focuses on defending transgender youth.

== History ==
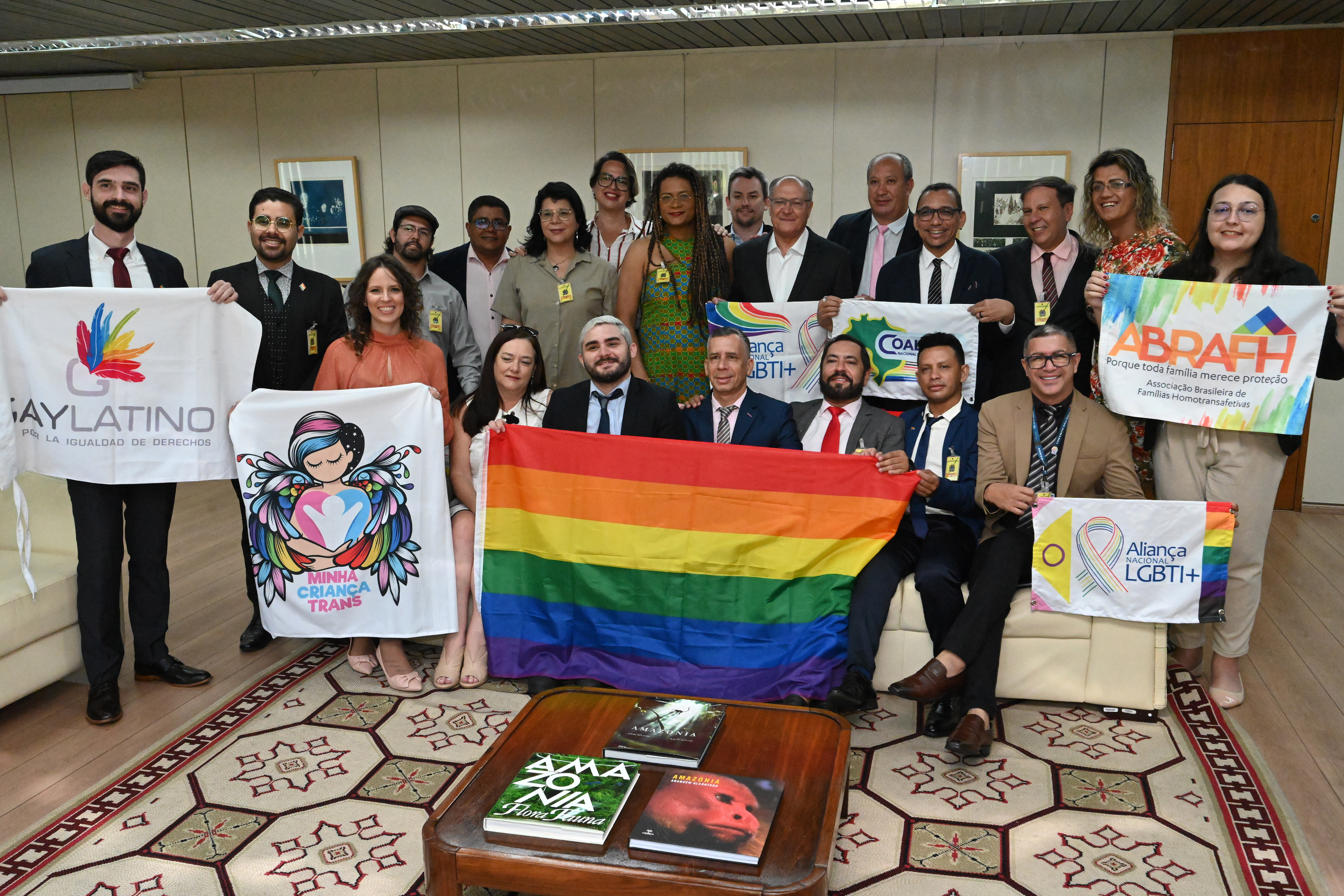
Thamirys Nunes in a meeting with vice-president Geraldo Alckmin in 2023.

Thamirys Nunes is the mother of a transgender child who began using her feminine identity publicly at the age of four, in 2019. Following an incident where Nunes was prevented from boarding a bus with her daughter due to transphobia, she left her job as a wedding planner to become a transgender rights activist. Thamirys published a book about her journey as the mother of a transgender child, Minha Criança Trans, in June 2020.

In 2022, Nunes founded the non-governmental organization (NGO) Minha Criança Trans. Initially, she worked with an LGBTQ NGO but decided to create one specifically for transgender children. According to Nunes, one of the reasons for founding her own NGO was the difficulty in finding support networks for transgender children of her daughter's age. Minha Criança Trans was officially registered in January 2023. During that year's São Paulo LGBTQ Pride Parade, the organization brought together 120 families under the slogan, "Being trans is a right. Our children deserve respect." At the 2024 LGBTQ Pride Parade, Minha Criança Trans organized a group for transgender children and adolescents, with 150 participants.

On 26 July 2024, Minha Criança Trans organized the event "Mutirão do Amor" (meaning "Mutual Aid of Love"), where 106 transgender children and adolescents, aged 6 to 16, obtained judicial authorization to amend their birth certificates. In October, the Attorney General of the Union advocated for the dismissal of a lawsuit filed by Federal Deputy Nikolas Ferreira, which sought to block a parliamentary amendment allocating funds to support research by Minha Criança Trans.

== Activities ==
Minha Criança Trans supports 650 families across Brazil and 75 families living abroad, assisting children aged 3 to 18. The organization's focus includes health, quality of life, public policy, and securing rights. The NGO operates with a board of eight volunteers. In 2024, Nunes devoted 12 hours a day to her work with the organization entirely on a voluntary basis. Its Instagram account has over 160,000 followers.
