= Tufts University School of Arts and Sciences =

Coordinates: 42.407°N 71.120°W

Tufts University School Arts and Sciences
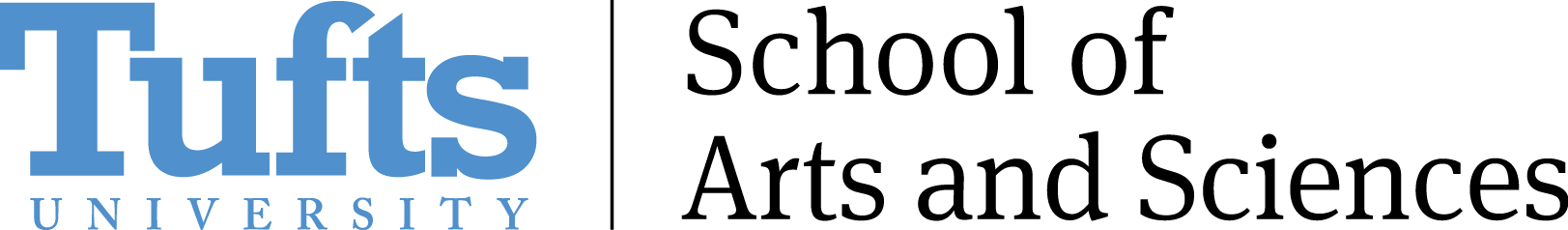
- Type: Private school
- Established: 1852
- Parent institution: Tufts University
- Dean: Bárbara M. Brizuela
- Location: Medford, Massachusetts and Somerville, Massachusetts, Massachusetts, U.S.
- Campus: Urban
- Website: as.tufts.edu

The School of Arts and Sciences (A&S) is a school of Tufts University, a private research university in Medford and Somerville, Massachusetts. It is the largest of the eight schools and colleges that comprise the university. Together with the School of Engineering, it offers undergraduate and graduate degrees in the liberal arts, sciences, and engineering. The two schools occupy the university's main campus in Medford and Somerville, Massachusetts and share many administrative functions including undergraduate admissions, student affairs, library, and information technology services. The two schools form the Faculty of Arts, Sciences, and Engineering (AS&E), a deliberative body under the chairmanship of the president of the university. Currently, the School of Arts and Sciences employs approximately 540 faculty members (of whom 330 are full-time). There are over 4,300 full-time undergraduates and 1,700 graduate and professional students.

== Organization ==
The School of Arts and Sciences is under the supervision of a dean, appointed by the president and the provost, with the approval of the Trustees of Tufts College (the university's governing board). The current dean is James M. Glaser.

The dean of arts and sciences oversees undergraduate and graduate education in 24 academic departments, more than 10 interdisciplinary programs, and 20 masters and Ph.D. programs. The School of Arts and Sciences consists of three degree granting units and the Summer Session:

- School of Arts and Sciences (formerly the College of Liberal Arts and Jackson College (LA&J)): Until 2002, male undergraduates received their degrees from the College of Liberal Arts and female undergraduates received their degrees from Jackson College for Women. However, the two colleges always shared the same faculty, curriculum, and facilities. From 2002 onward, all undergraduates received their degree from the School of Arts and Sciences. Jackson College is a distinct college in name only.
- Graduate School of Arts and Sciences (GSAS): GSAS maintains formal dual degree programs with the School of Engineering, the Fletcher School of Law and Diplomacy, and the Gerald J. and Dorothy R. Friedman School of Nutrition Science and Policy.
- The School of the Museum of Fine Arts at Tufts University (SMFA at Tufts): the art school was formally acquired by Tufts University and became part of the School of Arts and Sciences in 2026.

The Experimental College (or ExCollege) is also part of the School of Arts and Sciences. This college is not a degree-granting entity. Instead, it serves as a locus for "educational innovation, expansion of the undergraduate curriculum, and faculty/student collaboration within the Arts and Sciences".

== History ==
While instruction in the liberal arts and sciences dates to the founding of Tufts College in 1852, the formal organization of the school came almost fifty years later. In 1903, the trustees of Tufts College adopted a "new plan" of organization that divided the college into several schools: Liberal Arts (formerly Letters), Engineering, Divinity (or Religion), Graduate Arts and Sciences, as well as the schools of medicine and dental medicine. The first four, all located on the Medford/Somerville campus, were grouped together as the "Department of Arts and Sciences" (later the Faculty of Arts and Sciences). This organization required any policy that affected the schools in the Department (the "Associated Schools") to be considered first by the constituent faculty and then by parent body. (This pattern of organization continues to the present day). The medical and dental school, located in Boston, remained outside this overlapping pattern of organization, as did the Fletcher School (established in 1933).

As Tufts developed, new units were incorporated into this dual organization. The Graduate School of Arts and Sciences was formally named as such in 1909. Jackson College for Women was created by the trustees as a coordinate college and chartered by the Commonwealth of Massachusetts in 1910. In 1925 Jackson College had a quota of 250 female students, and prospective students were officially required to take the Tufts University entrance examinations.

The Division of University Extension, established in 1939–1940, became Associated Schools. Each of the associated schools had its own dean and faculty, with the exception of Jackson College, which always shared the same faculty as the School of Liberal Arts. In 1939, following the retirement of the long-time dean of the School of Liberal Arts, the separate posts of dean of the Faculty of Arts and Sciences and dean of admissions were created. The Division of University Extension was renamed the Division of Special Studies in 1949. Except for the 1962–1965 period, the School of Religion (formally renamed the Crane Theological School in 1955) was one of the Associated Schools of the Faculty of Arts and Sciences from 1903 until the school's closing in 1967. When Tufts College formally became Tufts University in 1952, the undergraduate divisions were renamed "colleges" and the graduate and professional divisions were renamed "schools."

In 1989, the board of trustees directed then-Tufts University president Jean Mayer to initiate a search for a new leader of the Faculty of Arts and Sciences (which at the time included the College of Engineering) with a vice presidential title. According to the second volume of Tufts official history, the then-chair of the board of trustees, Nelson Gifford, allegedly saw the person hired to fill the new post of academic vice president for arts, sciences, and technology (redesignated vice president for arts, sciences, and technology in 1991 and then vice president for arts, sciences, and engineering in 1999) as a potential successor to Mayer. Two men held the vice presidency: Robert I. Rotberg, formerly professor of political science at Massachusetts Institute of Technology (1989–1990) and I. Melvin Bernstein, formerly professor of mechanical engineering and provost at the Illinois Institute of Technology (1990–2001). In 1999, the College of Engineering was renamed the School of Engineering and took responsibility for all graduate engineering programs from the Graduate School. As part of the same reorganization, the trustees redesignated the Faculty of Arts and Sciences as the Faculty of Arts, Sciences, & Engineering and formally created a School of Arts and Sciences (encompassing the College of Liberal Arts and Jackson College and the Graduate School of Arts and Sciences). After the retirement of President John A. DiBiaggio and Bernstein's appointment as provost of Brandeis University in 2001, Tufts new president Lawrence S. Bacow abolished the vice presidency for arts, sciences, and engineering and created the post of dean of the School of Arts and Sciences. Developmental biologist Susan G. Ernst held the position of dean of the School of Arts and Sciences, from September 2001 until she returned to full-time teaching and research in the Biology Department in September 2005. She was succeeded as dean by psychologist Robert J. Sternberg, formerly the IBM Professor of Psychology and Management at Yale University. Sternberg remained in that position until 2010, when he departed to become Provost at Oklahoma State University. He was succeeded by neuroscientist Joanne Berger-Sweeney, formerly the Associate Dean of Wellesley College.

Since 2007, the School of Arts and Sciences has published the Tufts Historical Review, a peer-reviewed journal for student-written publications whose editorial board is composed of Tufts undergraduates.

== See also ==
- List of coordinate colleges

== Sources ==
1. Richard M. Freeland, Academia's Golden Age: Universities in Massachusetts, 1945-1970 (New York: Oxford University Press, 1992).
2. Sol Gittleman, An Entrepreneurial University: The Transformation of Tufts, 1976-2002 (Medford, Mass.: Tufts University Press, 2004).
3. Russell Miller, A Light on the Hill: A History of Tufts College, 1852-1952 (Boston: Beacon Press, 1986).
