= Benjamin Abrahão Botto =

Lebanese photographer (1890–1938)

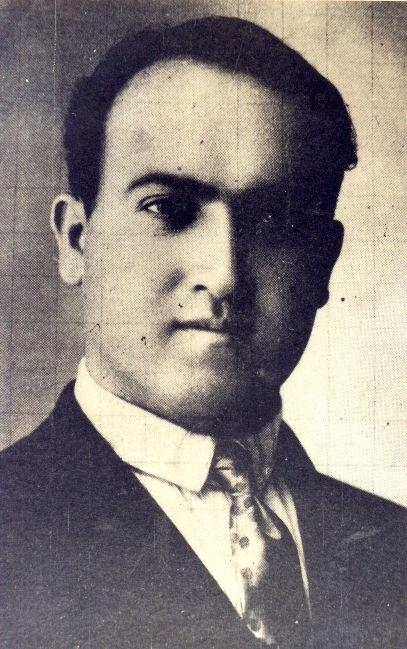
Botto

Benjamin Abrahão Botto (c. 1890 – May 10, 1938) was a Lebanese-born Brazilian photographer. He is best known for filming the Cangaço and its leader Virgulino Ferreira da Silva. He was murdered during the Estado Novo period in Brazil.

== Early life ==
Benjamin Abrahão Botto was born in Lebanon. To avoid becoming a conscript of the Ottoman Empire that fought in the First World War, Abrahão migrated to Brazil in 1915. In Recife, he worked as a traveling salesman, selling cloth and small goods. Attracted by the frequency of pilgrims in the city of Juazeiro do Norte, he moved his business there. Abahão was the secretary of Padre Cícero and met the cangaceiro Lampião in 1926 when he went to Juazeiro do Norte to ask for the priest's blessing and seek the rank of Captain, for helping the government in the pursuit of the Coluna Prestes.

== Career ==
In 1929, Abrahão photographed the cangaceiro leader with the priest, two of the most important figures of the northeast region of Brazil. After the death of Padre Cícero, Abrahão asked and received permission from the infamous Lampião to follow his group in the Caatinga and take the photos that in the future would immortalize them. For that he had the help of cearense Ademar Bezerra de Albuquerque, owner of ABAFILM, lent him the equipment and taught him to use it. The Getúlio Vargas government, which saw Abrahão as an enemy of the regime, seized his work. He was murdered at Serra Talhada (with 42 stab wounds) without either the killer or the motivation for the crime ever surfacing.

=== Lampião's Letter ===
Lampião himself wrote a letter, certifying that his pictures were taken by Abrahão.

The text below is a translation from the Portuguese original letter wrote by Lampião. It is important to highlight that Lampião was semi-alphabetized and the text may have many errors in the Portuguese version.

Honourable Mr. Benjamim Abrahão

Greetings.

I come to tell that you were the first person that could record me with all my personal cangaceiro, recording all our movement of our life in the Caatingas of the Northeast’s sertões. Other people could not, nor they will, nor I will allow it anymore. No more, from the friend Captain Virgulino Ferreira da Silva

A.K.A. Captain Lampião.

— Captain Virgulino Ferreira da Silva, Letter to Benjamin Abrahão Botto

== Recordings ==
Abrahão had to work out how to record the group that was running away from the government's increasingly violent pursuit. The meeting occurred in an isolated place of the Brazilian Caatinga, where the cangaceiro leader, very suspicious of the man's intentions, he did the first recordings with the photographic equipment himself. Only then did he allow Abrahão to record. Abrahão then returned to Fortaleza with his work obtained more resources to take more pictures of the group. Some started considering Abrahão a suspect because he sent pictures and articles to newspapers describing their adventures, but also for his knowledge of the whereabouts of the group.

== Abandon and rescue ==
On April 7, 1937, newspapers transcribed the order from the director of the national Department of Press and Propaganda (Departamento de Imprensa e Propaganda-DIP) that determined the seizure of the movie "Lampião".

Here is the transcription:

Secretary of Public Security of the Ceará State. Came to the knowledge of the National Department of Press and Propaganda that is being announced or exhibited in the capital or in the cities of your state, a movie about Lampião, the property of "Aba Filmes" located in the street Major Facundo. I request the immediate apprehension of the cited movie, with all its copies and negatives to be sent to this department. The negotiation of this movie with third parties should be avoided for the movie not to leave Brazil. Regardful greetings.

— Lourival Fontes, Director of the national Department of Press and Propaganda

His works were forgotten until the 1950s when the Getúlio Vagas Foundation incorporated them. In 1999, his life became the subject of the movie Perfumed Ball. In 2000, his work was presented in many expositions in Paris, São Paulo and Rio de Janeiro.

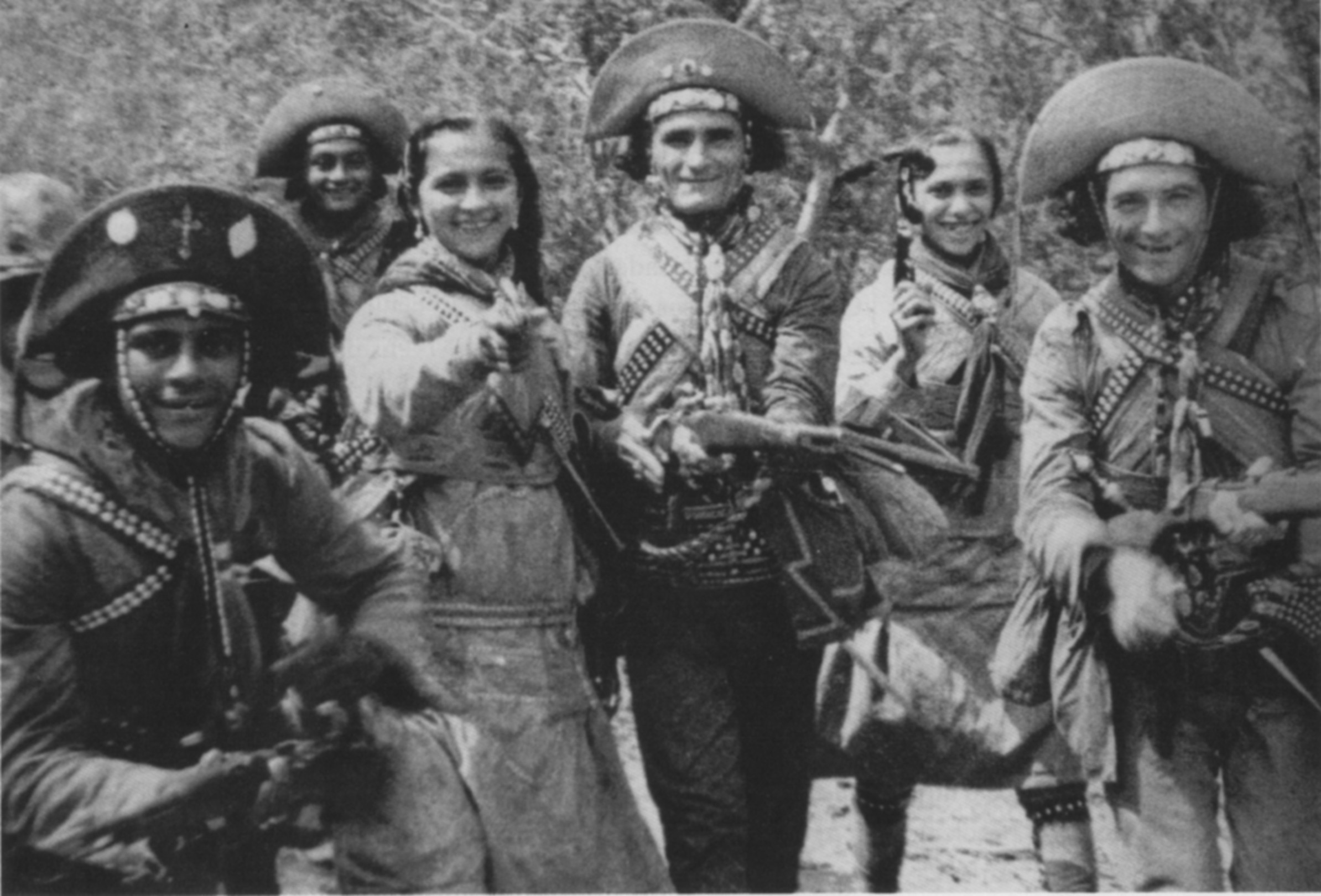

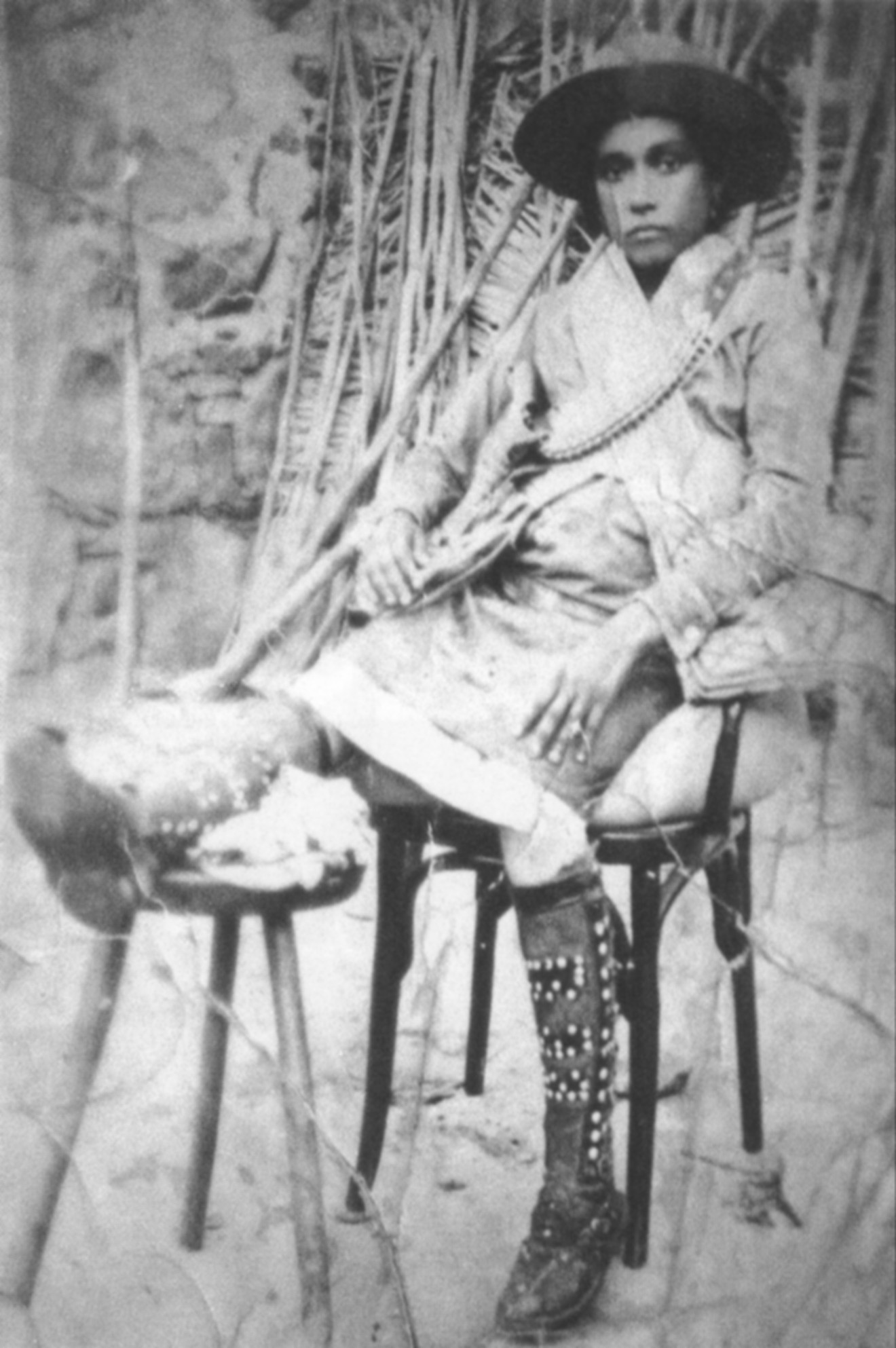

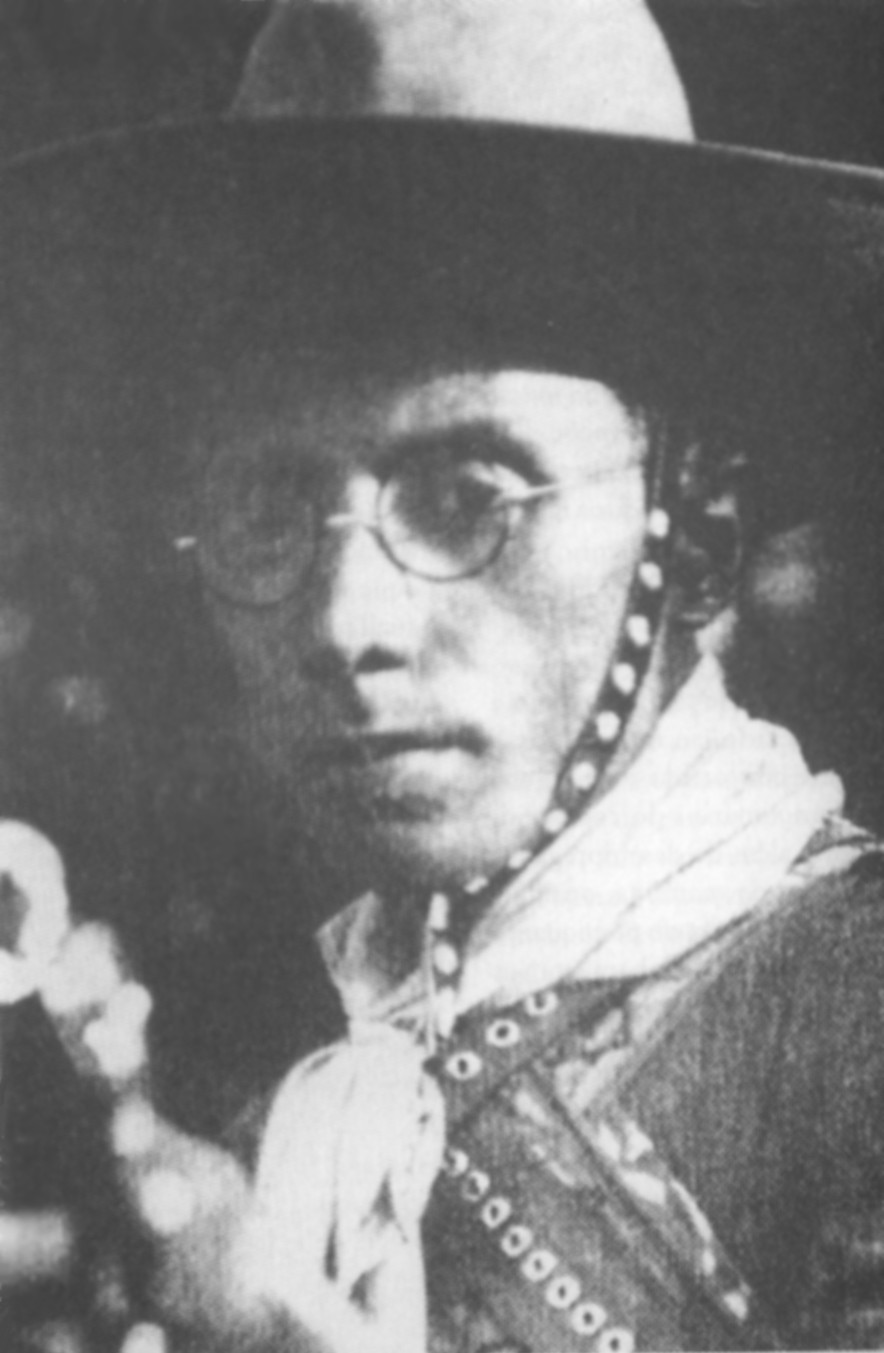

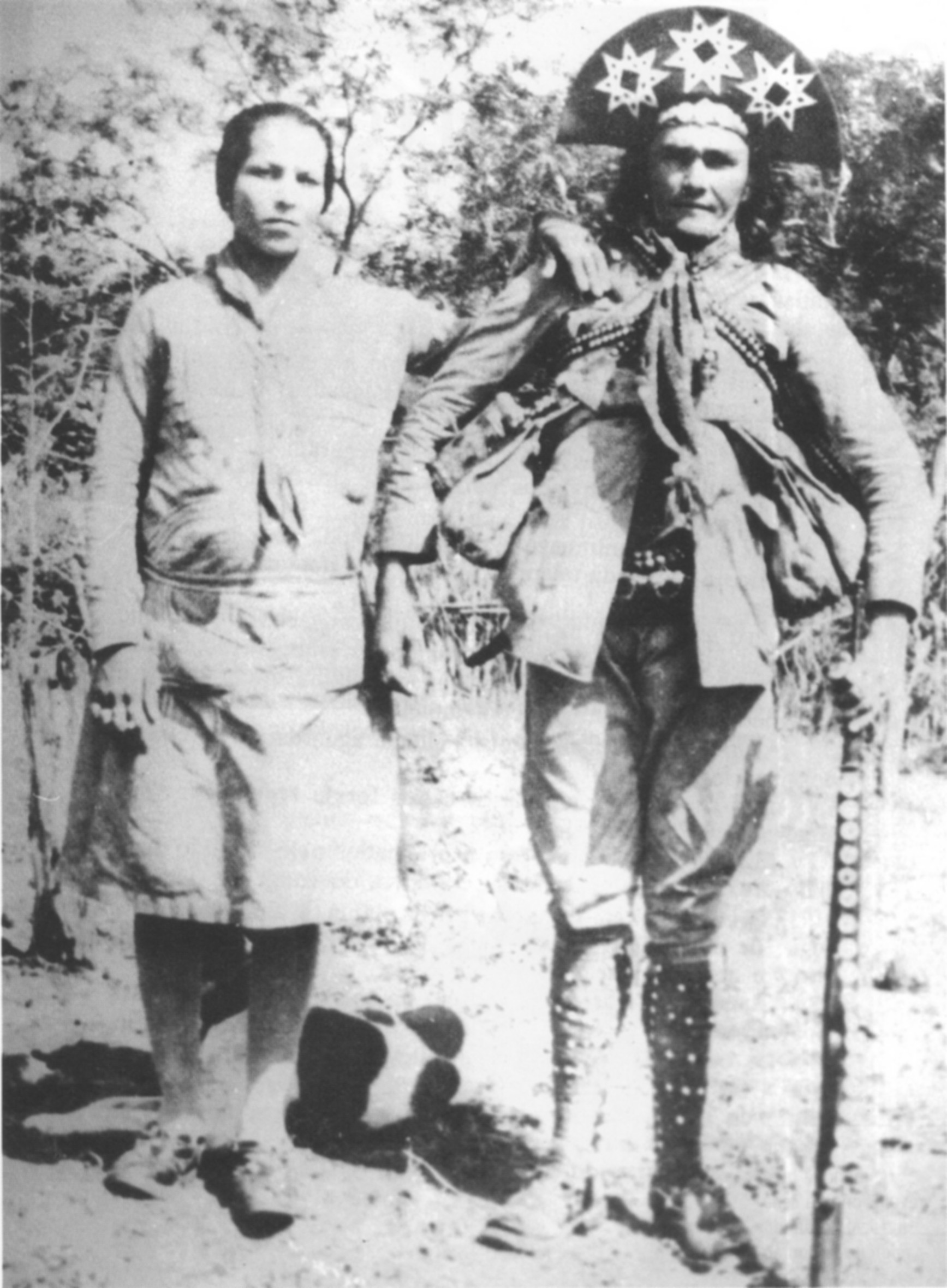

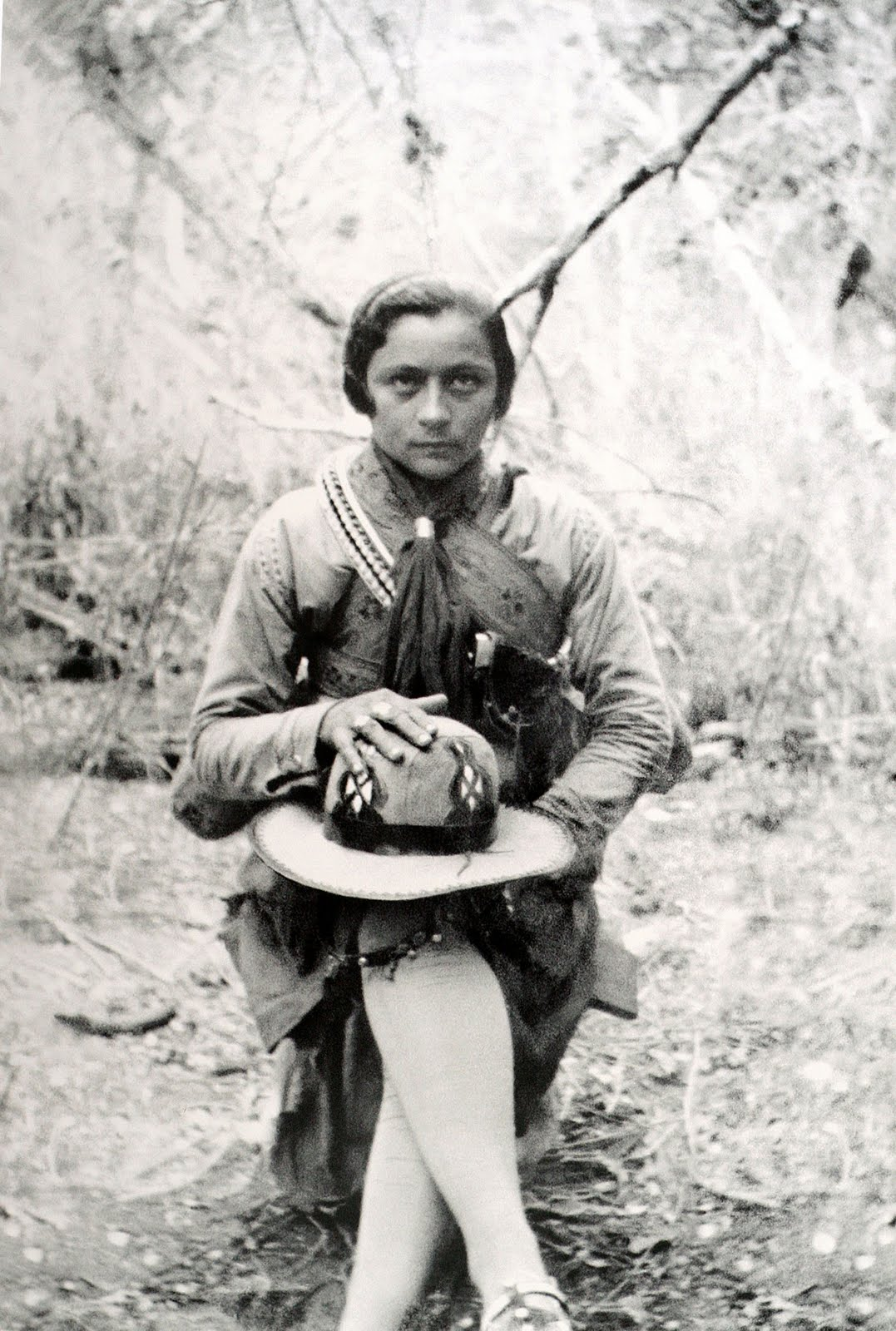

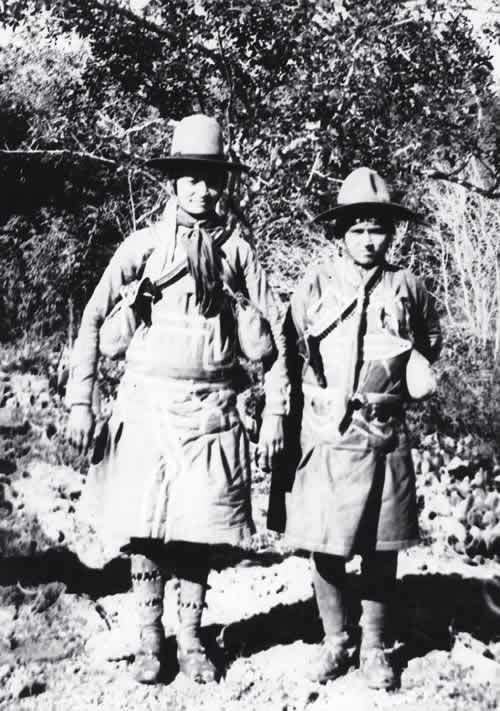

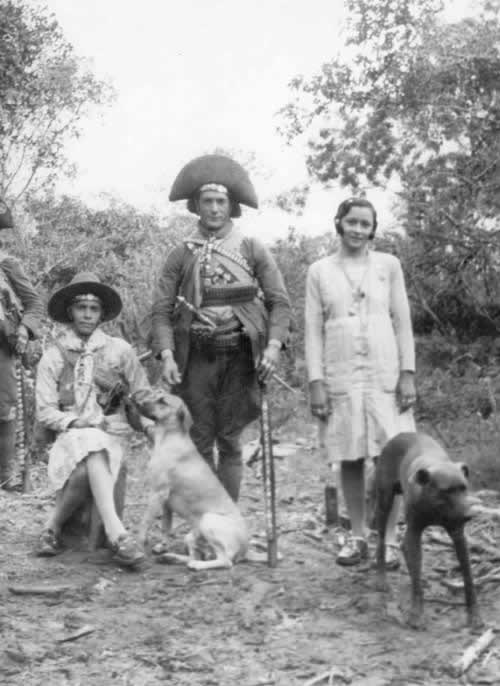

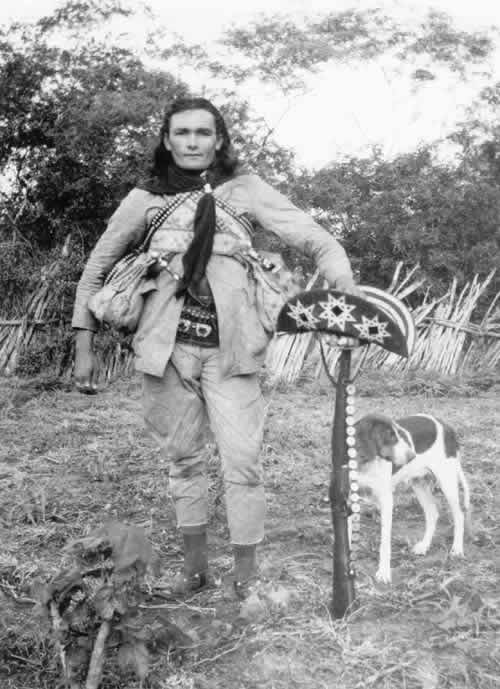
