= Analúcia Schliemann =

Brazilian developmental psychologist

Analúcia Dias Schliemann (born 1943) is a Brazilian developmental psychologist and scholar of mathematics education focusing on the development of mathematical reasoning. For many years she was a professor at the Federal University of Pernambuco, and she is a professor emerita of education at Tufts University near Boston.

== Education and career ==
Schliemann is from Pernambuco, where she was born in 1943. She earned a bachelor's degree and a licenciate in education from the Federal University of Pernambuco, then went to France, with the support of a French government scholarship, to study psychology. She received a second licenciate in psychology through the University of Lyon, and a master's degree in psychology through the University of Paris. In 1980, she completed a Ph.D. in psychology at University College London, in England.

Meanwhile, she held a professorship in psychology at the Federal University of Pernambuco, beginning in 1970. In 1994, she moved to Tufts University as a professor of education. She retired as a professor emerita in 2010.

== Book ==
Schliemann is the coauthor of books including:

- Na vida dez, na escola zero (in Portuguese, with Terezinha Nunes and David Carraher, Cortez, 1989), translated into English as Street mathematics and school mathematics (Cambridge University Press, 1993) and into Spanish as En la vida diez, en la escuela cero (Siglo XXI, 1999)
- Bringing Out the Algebraic Character of Arithmetic: From Children’s Ideas to Classroom Practice (with David Carraher and Bárbara M. Brizuela, Routledge, 2007)
