= James M. Glaser =

Political scientist

- Education: University of California, Berkeley (PhD)
- Employer: Santa Clara University
- Title: Executive Vice President and Provost
- Term: 2024-present

James M. Glaser is an American political scientist specializing in electoral politics and political behavior. He is currently the Executive Vice President and Provost at Santa Clara University.

== Education and career ==
Glaser received his B.A. from Stanford University and his Ph.D. from the University of California, Berkeley. He first joined the Department of Political Science at Tufts in 1991 as an assistant professor. From 2003 to 2010, Glaser served as the university's Dean of Undergraduate Education. He then served as Dean of Academic Affairs for Arts and Sciences from 2010 to 2014.

In 2015, he was named the Dean of the Tufts University School of Arts and Sciences. During his tenure at Tufts, the School of Arts and Sciences acquired the School of the Museum of Fine Arts, Boston, which was renamed the School of the Museum of Fine Arts at Tufts.

Glaser was appointed to the board of trustees of the Museum of Fine Art, Boston in 2016.

In December 2023, Glaser announced he would be stepping down from his roles at Tufts in June 2024 to become the Executive Vice President and Provost at Santa Clara University.

== Select publications ==
Books

He is the co-author (with Timothy J. Ryan) of Changing Minds, if Not Hearts: Political Remedies to Racial Issues University of Pennsylvania Press, 2013. In this book, Glaser and Ryan argue that "although political processes often inflame racial tensions, the tools of politics also can alleviate conflict."

His two previous books, The Hand of the Past in Contemporary Southern Politics, (Yale University Press, 2005) and Race, Campaign Politics, and the Realignment in the South, (Yale University Press, 1996), each received the Southern Political Science Association's V.O. Key Prize awarded to the year's best book on southern politics.

Journal Articles

- Glaser, James M., Jeffrey M. Berry, and Deborah J. Schildkraut. 2023. "Ideology and Support for Federalism in Theory – and in Practice". Publius, 53:511-535.
- Glaser, James M., Jeffrey M. Berry, and Deborah J. Schildkraut. 2021. "Education and the Curious Case of Conservative Compromise". Political Research Quarterly, 74:59-75.
- Berry, J. M., Glaser, James M., 2018. "Compromising Positions: Why Republican Partisans are More Rigid than Democrats". Political Science Quarterly, 133(1).
- Glaser, James M., 2003. "Social context and inter-group political attitudes: Experiments in group conflict theory". British Journal of Political Science, 33(04), 607–620.
- Glaser, James M., 2002. "White voters, black schools: Structuring racial choices with a checklist ballot". American Journal of Political Science, 35–46.
- Glaser, James M., Gilens, M. 1997. "Interregional migration and political resocialization: A study of racial attitudes under pressure". The Public Opinion Quarterly, 61(1), 72–86.
- Glaser, James M., 1997. "Toward an explanation of the racial liberalism of American Jews". Political Research Quarterly, 50(2), 437–458.
- Glaser, James M., 1994. "Back to the black belt: Racial environment and white racial attitudes in the South". The Journal of Politics, 56(01), 21–41.
