= Paloma Nunes =

Brazilian politician (born 1997)

Member of the Legislative Assembly of Ceará
- Incumbent
- Assumed office 1 February 2027

Personal details
- Born: 8 October 1997 (age 29)
- Party: Brazilian Socialist Party (since 2026)

Maria Paloma de Araujo Cavalcante Vieira (born 8 October 1997), better known as Paloma Nunes, is a Brazilian politician who was elected member of the Legislative Assembly of Ceará in 2026. She is the first lady of Tianguá.
