= Terezinha Nunes =

British-Brazilian clinical psychologist and academic

Terezinha Nunes (born 3 October 1947) is a British-Brazilian clinical psychologist and academic, specialising in children's literacy and numeracy, and deaf children's learning. Since 2005, she has been Professor of Educational Studies at the University of Oxford and a Fellow of Harris Manchester College, Oxford.

Nunes previously taught at the Federal University of Minas Gerais, and the University of Pernambuco; both in Brazil. She then moved to the United Kingdom where she taught at the Institute of Education, University of London (rising to be Professor of Education, Child Development and Learning), and at Oxford Brookes University (as Professor of Psychology and Head of Department). She then moved to the University of Oxford.

== Selected works ==
- Nunes, Terezinha; Schliemann, Analucia Dias; Carraher, David William (1993). Street mathematics and school mathematics. Cambridge: Cambridge University Press. ISBN 978-0521381161.
- Nunes, Terezinha; Bryant, Peter (1996). Children doing mathematics. Oxford: Blackwell. ISBN 978-0631184720.
- Nunes, Terezinha; Bryant, Peter, eds. (2006). Improving literacy by teaching morphemes. London: Routledge. ISBN 978-0415383127.
- Nunes, Terezinha; Bryant, Peter (2009). Children's reading and spelling: beyond the first steps. Chichester: Wiley-Blackwell. ISBN 978-0631234036.
