= Deborah Schildkraut =

American political scientist

- Education: Oberlin College; Tufts University
- Scientific career
- Fields: Political science
- Workplaces: Tufts University; Princeton University

Deborah J. Schildkraut is an American political scientist. She is a professor in the Department of Political Science at Tufts University, where she has also been department chair. She studies the relationship between American public opinion and the changing ethnic composition of the United States. She is an expert on American national identity, and how it interacts with immigration to the United States.

== Education and positions ==
Schildkraut studied political science at Tufts University, obtaining a BA in political science in 1995. She then attended graduate school in the Department of Politics at Princeton University, where she earned an MA in 1995 and a PhD in 2000.

After graduating with her PhD in 2000, Schildkraut joined the Department of Politics at Oberlin College. In 2004, she moved to Tufts University. She was the chair of the Department of Political Science at Tufts University from 2015 to 2018, and began a second term as department chair in 2019. In addition to the Department of Political Science, she has also been affiliated with the Jonathan M. Tisch College of Civic Life since 2015, and has been a faculty fellow there.

== Research ==
In 2005, Schildkraut published the book Press "One" for English: Language Policy, Public Opinion, and American Identity. In Press "One" for English, Schildkraut uses opinion data from sources like public opinion surveys and focus groups to study the popularity of legislation that would make English the sole national language of the United States, arguing that peoples' opinions on language policy issues are shaped by their ideas about American national identity. Schildkraut examines how four major themes in American identity — liberalism, ethnoculturalism, civic republicanism, and the continual incorporation of immigrant groups — affect respondents' views on three potential policies: making English the official language of the United States, mandating that election ballots can only be printed in English, and ceasing to offer bilingual education in American schools. Schildkraut introduces the last of these themes in American identity as an extension of a theory by Rogers Smith, giving the name "incorporationism" to the continual assimilation or incorporation of immigrant groups into the American polity. Schildkraut shows that invoking different themes of American identity can affect respondents' attitudes towards the various language policies; for example, endorsing ethnoculturalism can increase respondents' support for making English the American national language, whereas rejecting ethnoculturalism can decrease it. Schildkraut also shows that the relationship between conceptions of American identity and support for complex policies like bilingual education is weaker than the relationship between identity and policies which are highly abstract and symbolic, such as making English the national language.

In 2004, Schildkraut received funding from the Russell Sage Foundation to conduct the 21st Century Americanism Survey, which asked questions designed to study the connection between debates about immigration policy and ideas of American identity, and under-sampled white Americans to better understand the attitudes of non-white Americans. The analysis of the 21st Century Americanism Survey resulted in Schildkraut's 2011 book, Americanism in the Twenty-First Century: Public Opinion in the Age of Immigration. In Americanism in the Twenty-First Century, Schildkraut studies the cohesiveness of American cultural identity in light of America's traditional role as a destination for immigration and its history as a settler society, as well as the interaction between American group identity and American institutions. The book is partly motivated by popular assertions that recent immigrants to the United States have tended to not adopt a fully American identity. Schildkraut studies empirically how much content and consensus there is regarding the idea of an American national identity, and measures the extent of Americans' attachment to this identity. In addition to continuing to explore the interaction between attitudes towards immigration and the four themes of American identity used in her previous book Press "One" for English, Schildkraut studies how much immigrants come to self-identify as American. Schildkraut finds that different subgroups in America have substantial overlap in how they define American identity, and that new immigrants do adopt American cultural identity more strongly than popular criticisms might suggest. For Americanism in the Twenty-First Century, Schildkraut received the 2012 Robert E. Lane Award from the Political Psychology Section of the American Political Science Association, which is given annually to the author of the best book in political psychology published in the previous year.

In 2017, Schildkraut and her collaborators were awarded a Presidential Authority Award from the Russell Sage Foundation for a study of the effects of state-level immigration policies on peoples' attitudes about belonging. In 2012, Schildkraut joined Ken Janda, Jeff Berry, and Jerry Goldman as a coauthor of the 12th edition of the textbook, The Challenge of Democracy: American Government in Global Politics, with a 15th edition scheduled for 2021.

Schildkraut has been an editorial board member of The Journal of Politics, of Polity, and of Politics, Groups, and Identities. She has been interviewed, or her work has been cited, in media outlets including The New York Times, The Washington Post, Vox, WBUR, and Time. Schildkraut has also written articles for outlets including The Washington Post and The Conversation.

== Selected works ==
- Press "One" for English: Language Policy, Public Opinion, and American Identity (2005)
- Americanism in the Twenty-First Century: Public Opinion in the Age of Immigration (2011)

== Selected awards ==
- Robert E. Lane Award, American Political Science Association (2012)
