= Poço Redondo =

Municipality in Sergipe, Brazil

- Municipality
- The Municipality of Poço Redondo
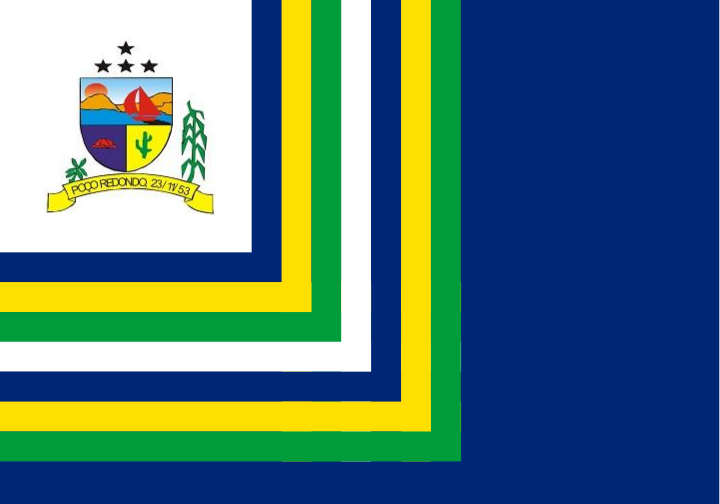
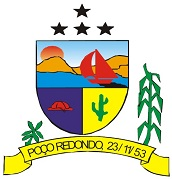
- Flag Coat of arms

- Location of Poço Redondo in the State of Sergipe
- Coordinates: 09°48′21″S 37°41′06″W
- Country: Brazil
- Region: Northeast
- State: Sergipe
- Founded: 1953

Government
  - Mayor: Frei Enoque Salvador de Melo (PSB)

Area
  - Total: 1,212.461 km^{2} (468.134 sq mi)
- Elevation: 188 m (617 ft)

Population (2020)
  - Total: 35,122
  - Density: 28.968/km^{2} (75.026/sq mi)
- Time zone: UTC−3 (BRT)
- HDI (2000): 0.536 – medium
- Climate: BSh

Poço Redondo (Brazilian Portuguese: [ˈposu ʁeˈdõdu]) is a municipality located in the Brazilian state of Sergipe. Its population is 35,122 (2020) and its area is 1,212 km^{2} (468 sq mi), which makes it the largest municipality in that state.

== See also ==
- List of municipalities in Sergipe
