= Maria Bonita (bandit) =

Brazilian bandit and folk heroine

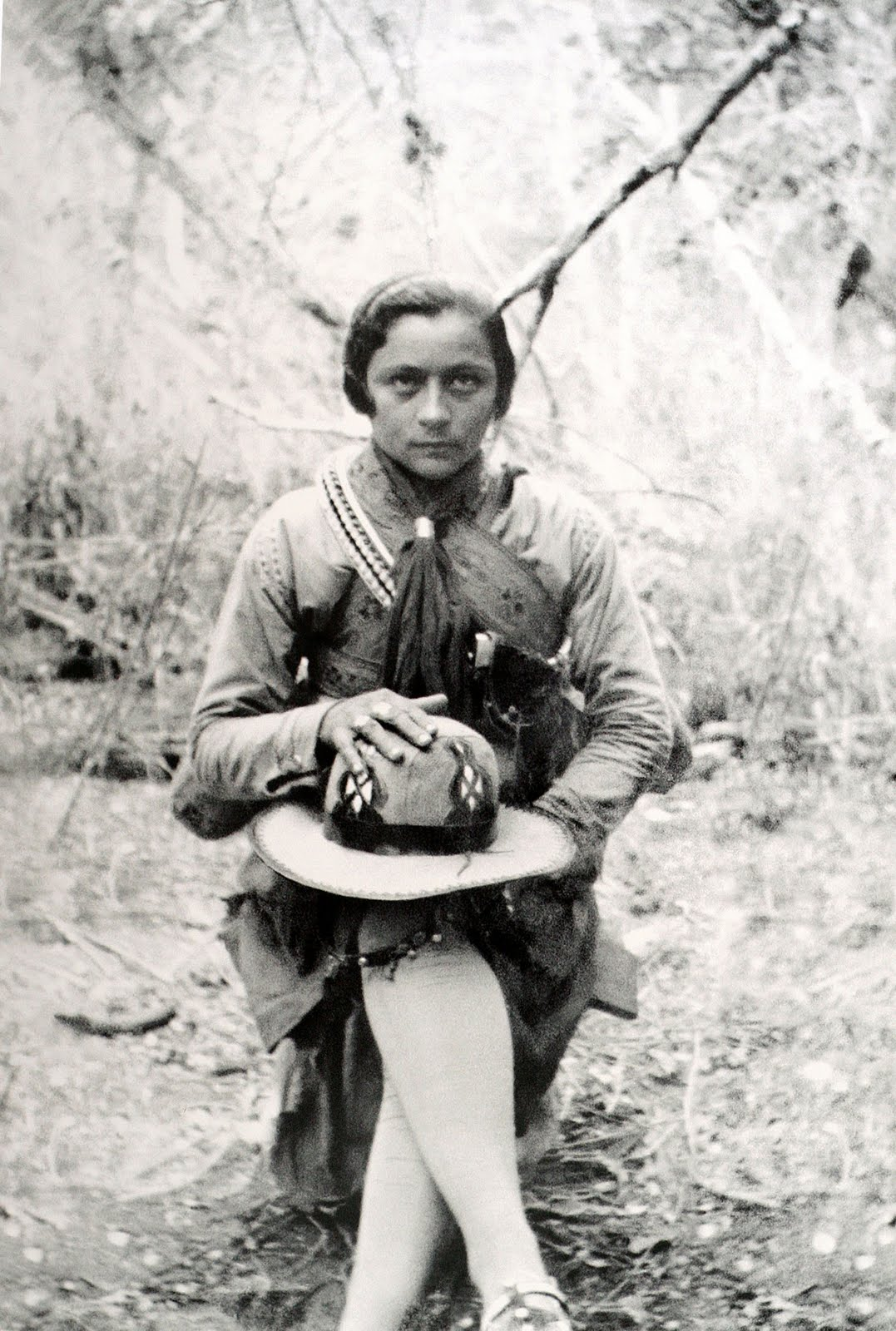
- Maria Bonita (Maria Déia) "Mrs Lampião" wearing a holstered pistol and a bandolier of ammunition over one shoulder.
- Born: Maria Déia; Bahia, Brazil
- Died: July 28, 1938; Angicos, Sergipe, Brazil
- Cause of death: Shot by paramilitary police
- Occupation: Cangaceira
- Known for: Banditry, Murder, Robbery, Extortion, Kidnap
- Spouse(s): José Nenem, Virgulino Ferreira da Silva (Lampião)
- Children: Expedita Ferreira

Maria Bonita was the nickname of Maria Nenem, born Maria Déia, a member of a Cangaço band, marauders and outlaws active in the Brazilian Northeast in the 1920s and 1930s. Maria Bonita means "Beautiful Maria". She has the status of a 'folk heroine' in Brazil. There is some inconsistency over her original name, with Maria Alia da Silva and Maria Gomes de Oliveira also attributed.

== Life ==
She was the girlfriend of "Captain" Virgulino Ferreira da Silva, better known as Lampião (Portuguese pronunciation: [lɐ̃ˈpjɐ̃w], meaning "lantern" or "oil lamp"), the outlaw bandit leader. She was raised in the Jeremoabo area of the State of Bahia.

Virgulino's father was killed in a confrontation with the police in 1919. Virgulino sought vengeance and proved to be extremely violent in doing so. He became an outlaw and was incessantly pursued by the police (whom he called macacos or monkeys). The cangaceiro bandit's weapons were mostly stolen or obtained by bribery from the police and paramilitary units and consisted of Mauser military rifles and a variety of smaller firearms including Winchester rifles, revolvers and the prized Luger semi-automatic pistol. The band, whose numbers varied between about a dozen up to a hundred, attacked small towns and farms in seven Brazilian states, fought pitched battles with paramilitary police, killed people and cattle, extorted money, kidnapped hostages for ransom, tortured, fire-branded, maimed, raped, and ransacked.

Maria Bonita joined Lampião and his bandits in 1930, aged in her early twenties. Like other women in the band, she dressed like the cangaceiros and participated in many of their actions. At the time she joined the bandits she was semi-estranged from her husband, José Nenem, a cobbler. The band travelled on horseback wearing leather outfits including hats, jackets, sandals, ammunition belts, and trousers to protect them from the thorns of the caatinga (dry shrubs, cacti and brushwood typical of the dry hinterland of Brazil's Northeast). The women who joined bandit groups were often termed cangaceiras. The cangaceiras were as hardy as the male bandits, they were also well-armed and were trained in the use of weapons. They were often involved in battles with the military police; Maria Bonita and a second female bandit were killed in a shoot out, and another woman in the band, Dadá, was wounded in a later battle with the police and had to have her leg amputated.

Maria and Lampião had a daughter, named Expedita, in 1932. A number of cangaceiras joined the band over the many years of its existence, and it was usual for Lampião to personally attend any births. Such children, including Lampião's own, were fostered out to settled relatives or friends of the cangaceiros, or left with priests. Expedita, after the deaths of her parents, was raised by her uncle, João Ferreira. Of the 5 Ferreira brothers, he was the only one who did not become an outlaw. A number of recorded anecdotes indicate that Maria and the other women in the band sometimes moderated excesses of cruelty by intervening on behalf of victims threatened by Lampião and the other cangaceiros.

== Death ==
On July 28, 1938, Lampião and his band were betrayed by one of his supporters, Joca Bernardes, and were ambushed in one of his hideouts, the Angicos farm, in the state of Sergipe, by a police troop armed with machine guns. In a quick battle, Lampião, Maria Bonita and 9 of his troops were killed, though around 40 others escaped. The heads of the dead bandits were cut off and sent to Salvador, the capital of Bahia, for examination by specialists at the State Forensic Institute, and later, for public exhibition, and only in 1969 were the families of Lampião and Maria Bonita able to reclaim the preserved heads to finally bury them.

== Folk heroine ==
The relationship of Maria Bonita and Lampião is firmly entrenched in Brazilian folk history, with a similar 'romance and violence' notoriety that Bonnie and Clyde achieved in the USA. The story of Lampião and Maria Bonita has been the subject of innumerable folk stories, books, comic books, popular pamphlets (cordel literature), songs, movies, and a number of TV soap operas, with all the elements of drama, passion, and violence typical of "Wild West" stories. The Brazilian popular song "Acorda Maria Bonita" (Wake up, Maria Bonita!) celebrates the cangaceira.

== Bibliography ==
- Chandler, Billy Jaynes (1978). The Bandit King: Lampião of Brazil. Texas A&M University Press. ISBN 0-89096-194-8.
- Curran, M.J. (2010) Brazil's Folk-Popular Poetry - a Literatura de Cordel, Trafford Publishing.
- Eakin, M.C. (1998) Brazil: The Once and Future Country, Palgrave Macmillan.
- Singelmann, Peter (1975) Political Structure and Social Banditry in Northeast Brazil. Journal of Latin American Studies, Vol. 7, No. 1.
