= Thamirys Nunes =

Brazilian transgender rights activist

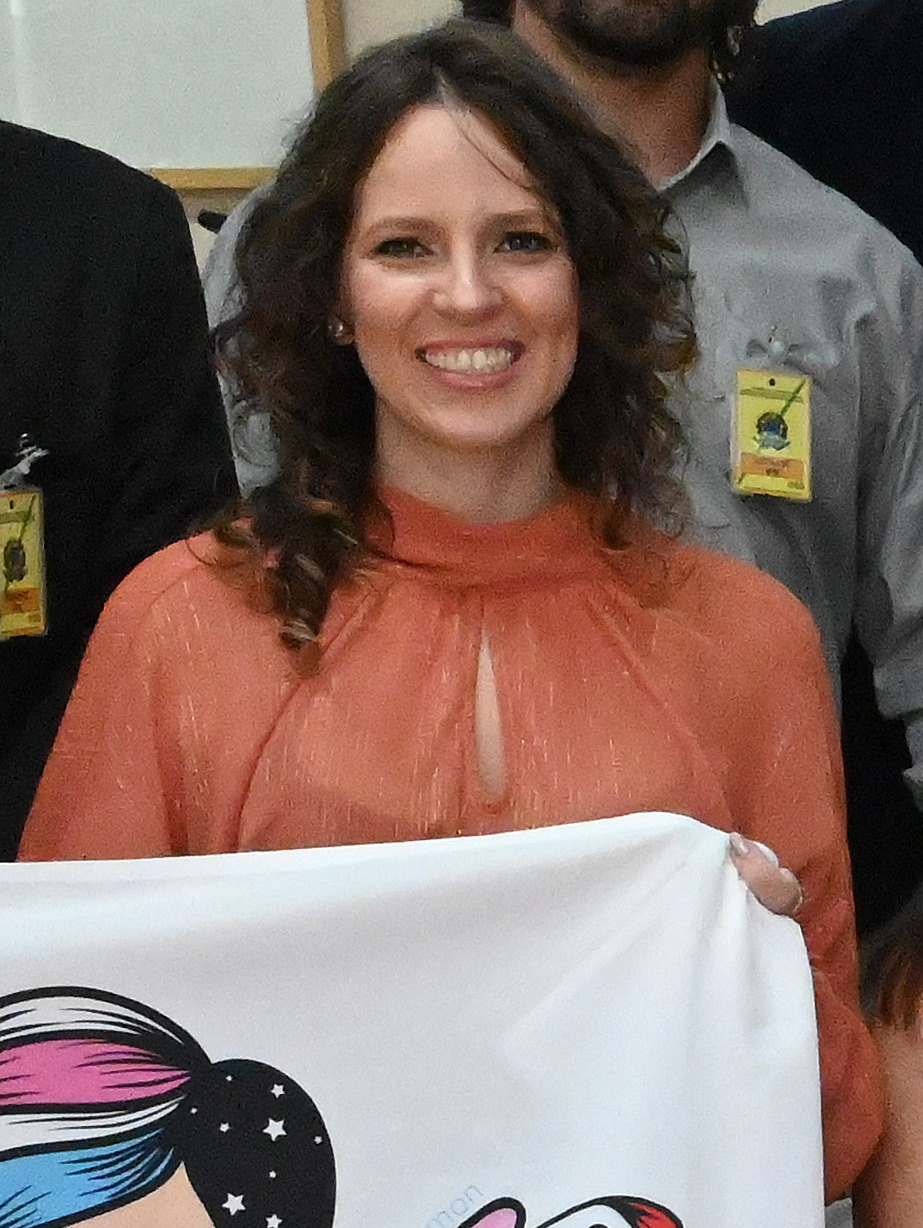
- Thamirys Nunes in 2023
- Born: 1989 or 1990 (age 35–36); Campinas, São Paulo, Brazil
- Citizenship: Brazilian
- Organization: Minha Criança Trans
- Known for: transgender activism
- Notable work: Minha Criança Trans (2020); A Menina no Espelho (2023)
- Children: 1
- Website: www.minhacriancatrans.com.br

Thamirys Nunes (Portuguese pronunciation: [taˈmiɾis ˈnunis]; born 1989 or 1990) is a Brazilian transgender rights activist. She is known for her story as a mother of a trans child and her book Minha Criança Trans (lit. 'My Trans Child'). She later founded the non-governmental organization (NGO) Minha Criança Trans.

== Biography ==
Thamirys Nunes was born in Campinas, São Paulo, in 1989 or 1990. She holds a degree in Social Communication and was raised in a conservative environment. According to Nunes, her daughter began showing signs of not identifying with the gender assigned at birth at the age of two. Initially, the parents tried to impose masculinity on her, but without success. At the age of three, her daughter began expressing a desire to have been born a girl, saying, "It's a pity God didn't make me a girl", and asking if she could die and be reborn as a girl. In 2019, when her daughter was four, Nunes told her she could express herself however she wanted. After this, her daughter began presenting herself publicly in a feminine way. Nunes had always wanted to have a boy. Eventually, a medical report confirmed her daughter's gender incongruence. According to Nunes, she and her daughter faced prejudice, including her daughter being denied enrollment in multiple schools due to transphobia. After an incident where Nunes was barred from boarding a bus with her daughter, she left her job as a wedding planner to become a transgender rights activist.

Nunes published a book about her family's experiences, Minha Criança Trans (My Trans Child), in June 2020. In it, she recounts her path to understanding her daughter's gender identity aiming to provide support to mothers facing similar challenges. She is also the author of the children's book A Menina no Espelho (The Girl in the Mirror), released in 2023, designed to discuss transgender issues with children. In 2022, she founded a non-governmental organization (NGO) with the same name as her book, Minha Criança Trans. Initially working with an LGBT NGO, she decided to establish one specifically for transgender children. According to Nunes, one reason for founding her own NGO was difficulty in finding support networks for transgender children of her daughter's age. By 2024, Nunes said she was dedicating 12 hours a day to working with the organization as a volunteer.

Nunes runs an Instagram profile under the name Minha Criança Trans, which has over 160,000 followers. The visibility of the page has made her the target of numerous threats. Consequently, she had to relocate and sought assistance from the Protection Program for Human Rights Defenders, Communicators, and Environmentalists, linked to the Ministry of Human Rights and Citizenship.

== Bibliography ==
- Minha Criança Trans (2020)
- A Menina no Espelho (2023)
