= Padre Cícero =

Brazilian Catholic priest (1844–1934)

Servant of God Padre Cícero
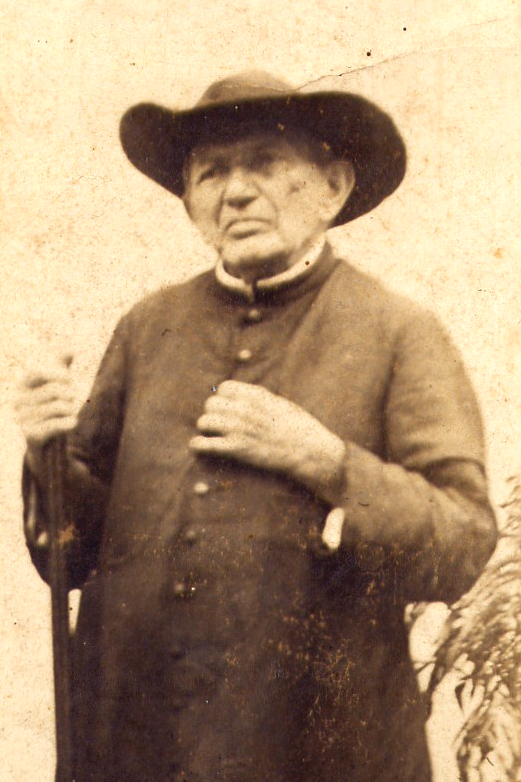
- Batista in 1924, aged 80
- Native name: Cícero Romão Batista
- Diocese: Crato

Orders
- Ordination: 30 November 1870 by Luís Antônio dos Santos, CM, Bishop of Ceará

Personal details
- Born: March 24, 1844 Vila Real do Crato, Ceará, Empire of Brazil
- Died: July 20, 1934 (aged 90) Juazeiro do Norte, Ceará, Brazil
- Buried: Chapel of Our Lady of Perpetual Help, Juazeiro do Norte
- Denomination: Roman Catholic

Cícero Romão Batista (24 March 1844 – 20 July 1934), also known as Padre Cícero (Father Cícero), was a Brazilian Catholic priest who became a spiritual leader to the people of Northeastern Brazil.

Batista has been declared a saint by the Brazilian Catholic Apostolic Church. He placed 32nd in The Greatest Brazilian of All Time, a nationwide public poll conducted in 2012.

Despite many conflicts with the Church hierarchy during his life, official reconciliation with the Catholic Church occurred in December 2015. The beatification process was opened on August 20, 2022 after the Dicastery for the Causes of Saints issued the official "nihil obstat" (no objections to the cause) edict and titled him as a servant of God.

== Career ==
Batista was actively involved in the politics of his time and was a member of the Conservative Republican Party of Brazil. When Juazeiro was raised to the status of a municipality in 1911, he was appointed its first mayor. He governed the city in this capacity for most of the next twenty years. In 1926 he was elected federal deputy, but he did not take office. On October 4, 1911, he and sixteen other political leaders from the region met in Juazeiro and signed a mutual cooperation agreement, as well as a commitment to support Governor Antônio Pinto Nogueira Accioli. The meeting was nicknamed the Pact of Colonels, being considered an important passage in the history of Brazilian coronelismo.

In 1913, he was removed from office by Governor Marcos Franco Rabelo, returning to power in 1914, when Franco Rabelo was deposed in the event that became known as the Juazeiro Sedition. He was also elected vice-governor of Ceará, in the Government of General Benjamin Liberato Barroso.

At the end of the 1920s, Batista to lose his political strength, which practically ended after the Revolution of 1930. His prestige as a miracle worker however, would increase even more.

Despite some attempts to relate Batista to communism and, much later, to liberation theology, he was deeply anti-communist. In an interview given in 1931, he stated: "Communism was started by the Devil. Lucifer is his name and the dissemination of his doctrine is the war of the Devil against God. I know communism and I know that it's evil. It's the continuation of the war of the fallen angels against the Creator and His children."

In the course of his ministry, he was accused of heresy by Catholic Church officials, eventually becoming suspended but not formally excommunicated.

== Legacy ==
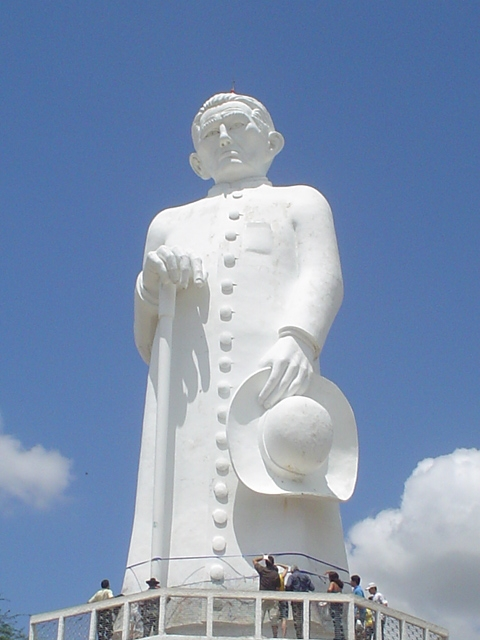
Statue of Padre Cícero, erected in the city of Juazeiro do Norte, the motto of which is "The Land of Padre Cícero"

Today, a large statue of Batista stands in Juazeiro do Norte, where he is considered to be the patron saint of the city. A pilgrimage to this statue takes place in his honour every November, attracting hundreds of thousands of followers.

Batista was canonized by the Brazilian Catholic Apostolic Church, an Independent Catholic church. He is not recognized as a saint by the Catholic Church, though Pope Benedict XVI proposed a study on Batista as a candidate for canonization.

On 13 December 2015, as part of the opening ceremonies of the Holy Year proclaimed by Pope Francis, the Bishop of Crato, Fernando Panico, declared the rehabilitation of Batista's status with the Catholic Church. He further declared Batista to have been a man of extraordinary virtues, formally reconciling him with the church.

== Beatification process ==
On August 20, 2022, during a Mass held in Largo da Capela do Socorro, in Juazeiro do Norte, the bishop of the Diocese of Crato, Magnus Henrique Lopes, announced that he had received a letter from the Dicastery for the Causes of Saints, the Vatican body responsible for beatification and canonization processes, informing about the authorization of Pope Francis for the opening of the beatification process of Batista.
