= Acústico MTV: Roberto Carlos =

Acústico MTV
- Version without MTV logo

Live album by Roberto Carlos
- Released: 3 October 2001
- Recorded: 8–9 May 2001
- Venue: Polo de Cinema e Vídeo, Rio de Janeiro, Brazil
- Genre: MPB; romantic music
- Length: 65:13
- Language: Portuguese
- Label: Sony Music
- Director: Rodrigo Carelli
- Producer: Guto Graça Mello

Roberto Carlos chronology
Amor Sem Limite (2000)	Acústico MTV (2001)	Roberto Carlos (2002)

Acústico MTV is a live album by singer-songwriter Roberto Carlos, released on 3 October 2001 through Sony Music Brazil, produced by MTV Brasil. It features some of the singer's hits acoustic versions.

== Background ==
=== Context ===
The show brings together some of the singer's hits in acoustic versions. For contractual reasons, there was a dispute between TV Globo and MTV about the show being shown on the cable TV network. The singer has an exclusive contract with the broadcaster in Rio de Janeiro, where Roberto cannot perform on other television stations. For contractual reasons, the show was never shown on MTV or on Brazilian television.

=== Recording ===
The program was recorded in the Jacarepaguá, neighborhood of Rio de Janeiro, over two days and featured VJs Luiz Thunderbird, Marina Person and Didi Wagner. A music video for Todos Estão Surdos was produced without images of the concert, something unheard of in the show's history. For the same reasons, Globo re-filmed a show similar to Acústico MTV in its studios and presented it as Roberto's end-of-year special. The album, which was an absolute sales success, as was the DVD, was withdrawn from the catalog.

The show features special guest appearances by musicians Milton Guedes playing harmonica on Parei na Contramão; Samuel Rosa, lead singer and guitarist of the rock band Skank, on guitar on É Proibido Fumar – re-recorded by the group from Minas Gerais on the tribute to Roberto and on the album Calango, in 1994; and Tony Bellotto, guitarist of Titãs, on É Preciso Saber Viver – re-recorded by the band from São Paulo on the album Volume Dois, in 1998.

== Commercial performance ==
The album sold 1.6 million records in the country. According to figures from Pro-Música Brasil, the DVD and CD have achieved 'diamond' sales certification.

== Track listing ==
All tracks are written by Roberto Carlos and Erasmo Carlos, except where indicated.

Acústico MTV: Roberto Carlos track listing
No.	Title	Writer(s)	Original album	Length
1.	"Além do Horizonte"		Roberto Carlos (1975)	5:23
2.	"As Curvas da Estrada de Santos"		Roberto Carlos (1969)	4:12
3.	"Parei na Contramão"		Splish Splash (1963)	3:14
4.	"Detalhes"		Roberto Carlos (1971)	6:01
5.	"Por Isso Corro Demais"	Roberto Carlos	Roberto Carlos em Ritmo de Aventura (1967)	3:46
6.	"É Proibido Fumar"		É Proibido Fumar (1964)	3:09
7.	"Todos Estão Surdos"		Roberto Carlos (1971)	5:44
8.	"Eu Te Amo Tanto"	Roberto Carlos	Roberto Carlos (1998)	5:37
9.	"O Grude (Um do Outro)"	Roberto Carlos	Amor sem Limite (2000)	4:48
10.	"Eu Te Amo, Te Amo, Te Amo"		O Inimitável (1968)	4:59
11.	"O Calhambeque (Road Hog)"	Gwen and John Loudermilk / version: Erasmo Carlos	É Proibido Fumar (1964)	3:31
12.	"É Preciso Saber Viver"		Roberto Carlos (1974)	3:22
13.	"Emoções"		Roberto Carlos (1981)	5:17
14.	"Jesus Cristo"		Roberto Carlos (1970)	6:10
Total length:				65:13

== Certifications ==
Certifications for "Acústico MTV: Roberto Carlos"
Region	Certification	Certified units/sales
Brazil (Pro-Música Brasil) CD	Diamond	1,000,000^{*}
Brazil (Pro-Música Brasil) DVD	Platinum	50,000^{*}
^{*} Sales figures based on certification alone.
