= MTV ao Vivo: Skank =

MTV Ao Vivo

Live album by Skank
- Released: 2001
- Recorded: Ouro Preto, Minas Gerais; July 7th and 8th 2001
- Genres: Alternative rock, reggae
- Label: Chaos / Sony Music
- Producers: Liminha, Skank

Skank chronology
Maquinarama (2000)	MTV Ao Vivo (2001)	Cosmotron (2003)

Professional ratings
Review scores
Source	Rating
Allmusic	3/5 stars

MTV Ao Vivo is the first live album by Skank, recorded in Ouro Preto and released in 2001. The album sold 600,000 copies.

It contains a Spanish version for The Police's "Wrapped Around Your Finger" and a new song "Acima do Sol".

== Track listing ==
=== Album ===
All tracks are written by Chico Amaral and Samuel Rosa, except where noted.

No.	Title	Writer(s)	Length
1.	"É Uma Partida de Futebol"	Nando Reis, Rosa	3:27
2.	"Esmola"		2:43
3.	"Pacato Cidadão"		3:49
4.	"Jackie Tequila"		4:59
5.	"Acima Do Sol"		4:06
6.	"Balada Do Amor Inabalável"	Fausto Fawcett, Rosa	3:45
7.	"Três Lados"		3:50
8.	"Tão Seu"		4:42
9.	"Saideira"	Rodrigo F. Leão, Rosa	3:26
10.	"Resposta"	Reis, Rosa	3:44
11.	"Te Ver"	Amaral, Rosa, Lelo Zaneti (Note: Uncredited on booklet)	3:40
12.	"Estare Prendido en Tus Dedos (Wrapped Around Your Finger)"	Gordon Sumner, adapted by Amaral	4:13
13.	"Tanto (I Want You)"	Bob Dylan, adapted by Amaral	3:51
14.	"Canção Noturna"	Amaral, Zaneti	3:56
15.	"Ali"	Reis, Rosa	5:00
16.	"Garota Nacional"		3:51
17.	"É Proibido Fumar"	Roberto Carlos, Erasmo Carlos	3:58
Total length:			66:00

=== Video ===
The DVD contains the full concert, as well as the band interviews.

All tracks are written by Samuel Rosa and Chico Amaral, except where noted.

No.	Title	Length
1.	"Intro (Maquinarama, remix version)"	2:28
2.	"Fica"	4:25
3.	"É Uma Partida de Futebol" (Rosa, Nando Reis)	3:11
4.	"Esmola"	2:37
5.	"Pacato Cidadão"	3:49
6.	"Amolação"	2:46
7.	"In(Dig)Nação"	4:04
8.	"A Cerca" (Amaral, Fernando Furtado, Rosa)	3:30
9.	"Rebelião"	4:00
10.	"Zé Trindade"	3:42
11.	"Jackie Tequila"	4:45
12.	"Balada do Amor Inabalável" (Rosa, Fausto Fawcett)	3:23
13.	"Três Lados"	3:50
14.	"Ela Desapareceu"	4:00
15.	"Tão Seu"	3:42
16.	"Saideira" (Rosa, Rodrigo Leão)	3:27
17.	"Estare Prendido En Tus Dedos" (Sting, adapted by Amaral)	4:08
18.	"Tanto (I Want You)" (Bob Dylan, adapted by Amaral)	3:43
19.	"Resposta" (Rosa, Reis)	3:46
20.	"Te Ver" (Rosa, Lelo Zaneti, Amaral)	3:35
21.	"Mandrake e os Cubanos"	4:27
22.	"Siderado"	3:38
23.	"Canção Noturna" (Zanetti, Amaral)	3:51
24.	"Acima do Sol"	4:02
25.	"Garota Nacional"	3:47
26.	"É Proibido Fumar" (Roberto Carlos, Erasmo Carlos)	6:07
27.	"Encerramento"	0:58

==== Bonus features ====
- Band Interviews
- Track-by-Track Commentaries
- Multi-Camera Angles ("Estare Prendido En Tus Dedos" and "Resposta")
- Discography
- Photo Gallery

== Personnel ==
Skank

- Samuel Rosa – lead vocals, acoustic and electric guitars
- Henrique Portugal – keyboards, acoustic and electric guitars, backing vocals, co-lead vocals on "A Cerca"
- Lelo Zaneti – bass guitar, backing vocals
- Haroldo Ferretti — drums

Additional musicians

- Chico Amaral – acoustic guitar (on "Acima do Sol", "Tanto", "Canção Noturna" and "Ali")
- Jorge Continentino – saxophone
- Paulo Márcio – trumpet
- Wagner Mayer – trombone
- Ramiro Musotto – percussion

== Production ==
- Producers: Skank and Liminha
- Executive producer: Fernando Furtado
- Recording technicians: Paulo Lima and Roberto Marques
- Mastering technician: Ricardo Garcia
- Project coordination: Bruno Batista
- Art supervision: Carla Framback
- A&R: Ronaldo Viana
- Photography: Marcos Hermes
- DVD Director: Joana Mazzucchelli
- Digital editing: Renato Cipriano, Bruno Ferretti

== Certifications ==
Region	Certification	Certified units/sales
Brazil (Pro-Música Brasil) DVD	Platinum	50,000^{*}
Brazil (Pro-Música Brasil) Album	2× Platinum	500,000^{*}
^{*} Sales figures based on certification alone.
