= Siderado =

Studio album by Skank
- Released: 1998
- Recorded: March to June 1998
- Genre: Ska punk; reggae rock
- Label: Sony BMG; DreamWorks

Skank chronology
O Samba Poconé (1996)	Siderado (1998)	Maquinarama (2000)

Professional ratings
Review scores
Source	Rating
Allmusic	3.5/5 stars

Siderado is the fourth studio album by Skank, released in 1998. It had the hits "Resposta" and "Mandrake e os Cubanos". Siderado has sold 750,000 copies.

== Track listing ==
All tracks by Samuel Rosa and Chico Amaral, except where otherwise noted.

1. "Marginal Tietê"
2. "Do Ben" (Samuel Rosa/Marcelo Yuka)
3. "Resposta" (Samuel Rosa/Nando Reis)
4. "Siderado"
5. "Mandrake e os Cubanos"
6. "Os Homens das Cavernas"
7. "Romance Noir"
8. "Don Blás"
9. "Calipsoê"
10. "No Meio Do Mar"
11. "Saideira" (Samuel Rosa/Rodrigo F. Leão)

== Certifications ==
Region	Certification	Certified units/sales
Brazil (Pro-Música Brasil)	Platinum	250,000^{*}
^{*} Sales figures based on certification alone.
