= Radiola (album) =

Compilation album by Skank
- Released: 2004
- Genre: Alternative rock
- Label: Sony BMG

Skank chronology
| Cosmotron (2003) | Radiola (2004) | Carrossel (2006) |

Radiola is a compilation album by Skank released in 2004, containing recent hits (all songs are from Maquinarama onward) and four new songs ("Um Mais Um", "Onde Estão?", "Vamos Fugir" and "I Want You", a Bob Dylan cover that had been previously recorded in a Portuguese version called "Tanto", released on the band's first album). The cover art is by the Clayton Brothers.

== Track listing ==
1. "Um Mais Um"
2. "Três Lados"
3. "Vou Deixar"
4. "Amores Imperfeitos"
5. "Vamos Fugir"
6. "Balada do Amor Inabalável"
7. "Dois Rios"
8. "Onde Estão?"
9. "Ali"
10. "Formato Mínimo"
11. "Canção Noturna"
12. "I Want You"

== Certifications ==
| Region | Certification | Certified units/sales |
|---|---|---|
| Brazil (Pro-Música Brasil) | Platinum | 125,000^{*} |
^{*} Sales figures based on certification alone.
