= Fausto Fawcett e os Robôs Efêmeros =

Studio album by Fausto Fawcett
- Released: 1987
- Recorded: 1987
- Genre: Rap rock, post-punk, new wave, funk
- Length: 41:27
- Label: WEA
- Producer: Liminha, Vítor Farias, Adrian Hudson, Iraí Campos

Fausto Fawcett chronology
Fausto Fawcett e os Robôs Efêmeros (1987)	Império dos Sentidos (1989)

Singles from Fausto Fawcett e os Robôs Efêmeros
- 1. "Kátia Flávia, a Godiva do Irajá" Released: 1987; 2. "Juliette" Released: 1988

Fausto Fawcett e os Robôs Efêmeros (Portuguese for "Fausto Fawcett and the Ephemeral Robots") is the debut album by the Brazilian musician Fausto Fawcett, accompanied by his backing band Os Robôs Efêmeros, which comprised his long-time friend and collaborator Carlos Laufer (electric guitar), Pedro Leão (electric guitar), and brothers Marcelo (drums) and Marcos Lobato (bass guitar), future members of O Rappa. Also featuring a guest appearance by Fernanda Abreu, it was released in 1987 by WEA (present-day Warner Music Group) and produced by Liminha alongside Vítor Farias and Adrian Hudson.

Described as a "cyberpunk concept album that strolls through a Blade Runner-esque Copacabana", its eight subtly interlinked tracks chronicle the lives of the seedy characters that inhabit a futuristic and technologically advanced version of the city of Rio de Janeiro. Even though it was mostly overlooked upon its release, Fausto Fawcett e os Robôs Efêmeros is now considered a seminal work of the then-blooming Brazilian rap rock/hip hop music scene, and has garnered a significant cult following over the years; it also spawned the hit singles "Juliette" and "Kátia Flávia, a Godiva do Irajá" – one of the first Brazilian rap songs ever and Fawcett's most well-known composition.

Warner Music re-released the album in CD format in 2001; however, both the vinyl and CD versions are currently out of print.

The track "Gueixa Vadia" features quotations from the songs "Born to Be Alive" (by Patrick Hernandez) and "Don't Let Me Be Misunderstood" (by Nina Simone).

== Appearances in other media ==
"Kátia Flávia, a Godiva do Irajá" was included in the soundtracks of the telenovela O Outro and of the feature-length films Bitter Moon and Elite Squad.

Fawcett and Os Robôs Efêmeros cameod as themselves, singing "A Chinesa Videomaker", in the 1987 film Subway to the Stars, directed by Fawcett's former college friend Cacá Diegues.

== Track listing ==
All tracks are written by Fausto Fawcett and Carlos Laufer, except for "Estrelas Vigiadas", which is written by Fawcett and Marcelo de Alexandre.

No.	Title	English title	Length
1.	"Gueixa Vadia"	Geisha Bitch	6:16
2.	"Tânia Míriam"		3:54
3.	"Drops de Istambul"	Drops from Istanbul	3:57
4.	"O Rap d'Anne Stark"	Anne Stark's Rap	6:35
5.	"Kátia Flávia, a Godiva do Irajá"	Kátia Flávia, the Godiva from Irajá	4:06
6.	"A Chinesa Videomaker"	Videomaker Chinawoman	7:02
7.	"Estrelas Vigiadas"	Watched Stars	5:00
8.	"Juliette" (feat. Fernanda Abreu)		4:12

== Personnel ==
- Fausto Fawcett – vocals
- Carlos Laufer – electric guitar, additional vocals
- Pedro Leão – electric guitar, additional vocals
- Marcelo Lobato – drums, additional vocals
- Marcos Lobato – bass guitar, additional vocals
- Fernanda Abreu – additional vocals (track 8)
- Soraya Jarlicht, Marília Van Boekel, Nelson Meirelles, Sérgio Mekler – additional vocals
- Iuri de Alexandre, Marcelo de Alexandre – keyboards
- Liminha – production, additional vocals, electronic drum, electric guitar
- Adrian Hudson – co-production
- Vítor Farias – co-production, mastering
- Iraí Campos – production (track 5), mastering
- Jorge Barrão, Luiz Serbine, Bárbara Szaniecki – cover art
