= Carrossel (album) =

Studio album by Skank
- Released: August 2006
- Genre: Alternative rock
- Label: Sony BMG
- Producers: Skank, Chico Neves, Carlos Eduardo Miranda

Skank chronology
Radiola (2004)	Carrossel (2006)	Estandarte (2008)

Professional ratings
Review scores
Source	Rating
Revista VIP	3/5 stars

Carrossel is the ninth studio album released by Brazilian rock band Skank, the last in the "deconstruction trilogy" begun with Maquinarama in which the group changed from ska towards a more alternative rock-oriented sound influenced by The Beatles and Clube da Esquina. Carrossel was the fifth best-selling album in São Paulo in 2006, peaking at second place.

Other than Samuel Rosa's usual songwriting partner Chico Amaral, there are contributions from Nando Reis, Humberto Effe, César Maurício, Arnaldo Antunes and Rodrigo Leão.

The track "Trancoso" was written with Arnaldo Antunes at Trancoso beach. The album's released singles are "Mil acasos", "Seus passos" and "Uma canção é pra isso" - the latter received a video which was nominated for the 2006 MTV Video Music Brazil award.

== Track listing ==
All songs written and composed by Samuel Rosa and Chico Amaral, except where noted.

No.	Title	Writer(s)	Translation	Length
1.	"Eu e a Felicidade"	Rosa, Nando Reis	"Me and the Happiness"	3:49
2.	"Uma Canção é Pra Isso"		"This Is What a Song is For"	3:51
3.	"Até o Amor Virar Poeira"		"Till Love Turns to Dust"	3:34
4.	"O Som da Sua Voz"		"The Sound of Your Voice"	4:48
5.	"Cara Nua"	Rosa, Humberto Effe	"Bare Face"	4:01
6.	"Mil Acasos"		"A Thousand Chances"	3:12
7.	"Lugar"	Rosa, César Maurício	"Place"	3:50
8.	"Notícia"	Rosa, Effe	"News"	4:28
9.	"Garrafas"	Lelo Zaneti, Amaral	"Bottles"	4:08
10.	"Panorâmica"		"Overview"	4:31
11.	"Balada para João e Joana"		"Ballad For João and Joana"	4:41
12.	"Trancoso"	Rosa, Arnaldo Antunes	"Trancoso"	3:20
13.	"Antitelejornal"	Rosa, Rodrigo Leão	"Antinewsflash"	4:33
14.	"Seus Passos"	Rosa, Maurício	"Your Footsteps"	3:44
15.	"O Homem Solitário"	Rosa, Amaral, Maurício	"The Lonely Man"	3:58
