= Cosmotron (album) =

2003 studio album by Skank

Studio album by Skank
- Released: 2003
- Genres: Alternative rock, reggae
- Label: Sony BMG
- Producers: Skank, Tom Capone

Skank chronology
Skank MTV ao vivo (2001)	Cosmotron (2003)	Radiola (2004)

Professional ratings
Review scores
Source	Rating
Allmusic	4/5 stars
Folha de S.Paulo	3/5 stars
Istoé Gente	4/5 stars

Cosmotron is the sixth studio album released by Skank in 2003.

== Track listing ==
1. "Supernova" (Samuel Rosa/Fausto Fawcett) - 4:37
2. "As Noites" (Samuel Rosa/Chico Amaral) - 4:52
3. "Pegadas na Lua" (Samuel Rosa/Humberto Effe) - 4:35
4. "Amores Imperfeitos" (Samuel Rosa/Chico Amaral) - 4:13
5. "Por um Triz" (Samuel Rosa/Rodrigo F. Leão) - 4:08
6. "Dois Rios" (Samuel Rosa/Lô Borges/Nando Reis) - 4:43
7. "Nômade" (Samuel Rosa/Chico Amaral) - 6:53
8. "Vou Deixar" (Samuel Rosa/Chico Amaral) - 4:34
9. "Formato Mínimo" (Samuel Rosa/Rodrigo F. Leão) - 5:12
10. "Resta um Pouco Mais" (Lelo Zaneti/Chico Amaral) - 3:51
11. "Os Ofendidos" (Samuel Rosa/Chico Amaral) - 3:47
12. "É Tarde" (Samuel Rosa/Chico Amaral) - 4:47
13. "Um Segundo" (Samuel Rosa/Chico Amaral) - 4:05
14. "Sambatron" (Samuel Rosa/Chico Amaral) - 5:10

== Personnel ==
Skank

- Haroldo Ferretti - drums
- Henrique Portugal - keyboards, Hammond organ, piano
- Samuel Rosa - vocals, acoustic guitar, electric guitar
- Lelo Zaneti - bass

Guest

- Paco Pigalle - vocals on "Nômade"

Production

- Skank - production
- Tom Capone - production, recording, mixing
- Bruno Ferretti, Renato Cipriano - recording
- Marco Diniz, Thiago Peixoto - recording assistants
- Álvaro Alencar - mixing
- Fernando Rebelo, Tomás Magno - mixing assistants
- Ricardo Garcia - mastering
- Fernando Furtado - executive producer
- Bruno Batista - production coordinator
- William Oliveira - production assistant
- Frederico Toledo, Marco Antônio Otoni, William Oliveira - studio assistants

Design

- Marcus Barão - graphic project
- Daniella Conolly - graphic supervisor
- Weber Pádua - graphic project, photography

== Certifications ==
Region	Certification	Certified units/sales
Brazil (Pro-Música Brasil)	Gold	100,000^{*}
^{*} Sales figures based on certification alone.
