= Estandarte =

Studio album by Skank
- Released: 2008
- Genre: Alternative rock
- Label: Sony BMG
- Producer: Dudu Marote

Skank chronology
| 'Carrossel' (2006) | Estandarte (2008) | 'Multishow ao Vivo: Skank no Mineirão' (2010) |

Estandarte is the tenth studio album released by Brazilian rock band Skank in 2008.

== Background ==
The album features 12 new and previously unreleased songs and has partnerships with both Chico Amaral and Cesar Mauricio, in addition to the usual partnership with Nando Reis. The album also marks the return of Dudu Marote's production.

One highlight is "Ainda Gosto Dela", featuring Negra Li emerging on the charts. The album also has the participation of the band Funk Como Le Gusta. The album is pop / rock mixed with soul, funk, reggae, surf music and electronic sounds. It marks the return of the group to the tunes of their earlier work, with strong influences from recent Britpop albums.

The song "Sutilmente" has been one of the most acclaimed by fans, surprising even Samuel Rosa. In a video, lyricist Nando Reis explained that he created the lyrics based on a text he had written to the Brazilian edition of Marie Claire in 2005. The work would be featured among texts written by other men invited by the magazine, which asked them to write messages to their loved women.

Analysing the lyrics in retrospect, Reis perceived the protagonist as a vain and self-centered person who asks his beloved woman to treat him accordingly to his current state. This lead Reis's wife to nickname it "cheek guy song" and Reis to see it as the "fucked up guy song".

== Track listing ==
All lyrics are written by Chico Amaral, unless where noted; all music is composed by Samuel Rosa.

| No. | Title | Lyrics | Translation | Length |
|---|---|---|---|---|
| 1. | "Pára-Raio" | Nando Reis | Lightning Rod | 5:02 |
| 2. | "Ainda Gosto Dela" | Reis | I Still Like Her | 5:13 |
| 3. | "Chão" | | Floor | 4:45 |
| 4. | "Canção Áspera" | | Rough Song | 4:32 |
| 5. | "Noites de um Verão Qualquer" | César Maurício | Nights of Any Given Summer | 3:36 |
| 6. | "Escravo" | | Slave | 4:10 |
| 7. | "Notícias do Submundo" | | News from the Underworld | 4:09 |
| 8. | "Sutilmente" | Reis | Subtly | 4:02 |
| 9. | "Um Gesto Qualquer" | | Some Gesture | 4:26 |
| 10. | "Assim Sem Fim" | Maurício | Endless Like This | 3:39 |
| 11. | "Saturação" | | Saturation | 6:13 |
| 12. | "Renascença" | Reis | Renaissance | 3:44 |

== Personnel ==
The band members' instruments are not credited on the album's liner notes. Their primary instruments are listed based on the album's recording and their de facto primary roles in the group.

Skank

- Haroldo Ferretti - drums, programming
- Henrique Portugal - keyboards, piano
- Samuel Rosa - vocals, acoustic and electric guitars
- Lelo Zaneti - bass

Additional musicians

- José Alves, Bernardo Bessler - violin on "Pára-Raio"
- Marcelo Cotarelli, Reginaldo Gomes - trumpet on "Pára-Raio"
- Hugo Hori - tenor saxophone on "Pára-Raio"
- Negra Li - guest vocals on "Ainda Gosto Dela"
- Márcio Mallard, Iura Ranetsky - cello on "Sutilmente"
- Dudu Marote - additional keyboards, drum programming, effects, synth bass, tambourine
- Geraldo Monte, Jesuina Passaroto, Christine Springuel, José Ricardo Taboada - Viola on "Sutilmente"
- Kito Sequeira - baritone saxophone on "Pára-Raio"
- Tiquinho - trombone on "Pára-Raio"

Production

- Camila Bahia, Angela Coelho, Ivana Simões - executive producers
- Bruno Batista - A&R
- Carlos Blau, Renato Cipriano, Mauricio Cersosimo, Marco Diniz - recording at Estúdio Máquina in Belo Horizonte, Minas Gerais
- Luiz Brasil - string arrangement on "Sutilmente"
- Roberto Calixto, Dionisio Dasul, Marco Diniz, Pablo Maia, Frederico Toledo - studio assistants
- Roberto Calixto, Lucas Tanure - executive producer assistants
- Michael Fossenkemper - mixing
- Bob Ludwig - mastering
- William Luna Jr. - string recording
- Dudu Marote - production, horn arrangement on "Pára-Raio", vocal arrangement
- Skank - vocal arrangement
- Tiquinho - horn arrangement on "Pára-Raio"

== Certifications ==
| Region | Certification | Certified units/sales |
|---|---|---|
| Brazil (Pro-Música Brasil) | Platinum | 100,000^{‡} |
^{‡} Sales+streaming figures based on certification alone.
