= Multishow ao Vivo: Skank no Mineirão =

11th live album by Skank

Multishow Ao Vivo - Skank no Mineirão

Live album by Skank
- Released: 2010
- Recorded: June 19th, 2010
- Venues: Mineirão, Minas Gerais
- Genre: Rock
- Language: Portuguese
- Label: Sony Music
- Producer: Dudu Marote

Skank chronology
Estandarte (2008)	Multishow Ao Vivo - Skank no Mineirão

Multishow Ao Vivo - Skank no Mineirão is the eleventh live album by Brazilian rock band Skank. It was released in 2010 by Sony Music in DVD and CD formats. The concert was recorded at Mineirão in Belo Horizonte for more than 50,000 people. This album contains remixed songs from their catalog, which were chosen by the audience via internet poll, and new songs. The cover shows Mineirão at its 1965 opening.

== Track listing ==
Disk 1
No.	Title	Writer(s)	Length
1.	"Mil Acasos"	Samuel Rosa, Chico Amaral
2.	"É uma Partida de Futebol"	Samuel Rosa, Nando Reis
3.	"Esmola"	Samuel Rosa, Chico Amaral
4.	"Presença (unedited)"	Samuel Rosa, Nando Reis
5.	"Ainda Gosto Dela"	Samuel Rosa, Nando Reis
6.	"Jackie Tequila"	Samuel Rosa, Chico Amaral
7.	"Balada do Amor Inabalável"	Samuel Rosa, Fausto Fawcett
8.	"Acima do Sol"	Samuel Rosa, Chico Amaral
9.	"De Repente (unedited)"	Samuel Rosa, Nando Reis
10.	"Três Lados"	Samuel Rosa, Chico Amaral
11.	"Vou Deixar"	Samuel Rosa, Chico Amaral
12.	"Garota Nacional"	Samuel Rosa, Chico Amaral
13.	"Sutilmente"	Samuel Rosa, Nando Reis
14.	"Resposta"	Samuel Rosa, Nando Reis
15.	"Vamos Fugir (Give Me Your Love)"	Gilberto Gil, Liminha
16.	"Tão Seu"	Samuel Rosa, Chico Amaral
17.	"Fotos na Estante (studio version)"	Samuel Rosa, Rodrigo F. Leão
Total length:			...

Disk 2
No.	Title	Writer(s)	Length
1.	"Uma Canção É Pra Isso"	Samuel Rosa, Chico Amaral
2.	"Um Mais um"	Samuel Rosa, Rodrigo F. Leão
3.	"Pacato Cidadão"	Samuel Rosa, Chico Amaral
4.	"Canção Noturna"	Lelo Zaneti, Chico Amaral
5.	"É Proibido Fumar"	Roberto Carlos, Erasmo Carlos
6.	"Amores Imperfeitos"	Samuel Rosa, Chico Amaral
7.	"Noites de um Verão Qualquer"	Samuel Rosa, César Maurício
8.	"O Beijo e a Reza"	Samuel Rosa, Chico Amaral
9.	"Te Ver"	Samuel Rosa, Lelo Zaneti, Chico Amaral
10.	"Ali"	Samuel Rosa, Nando Reis
11.	"Dois Rios"	Samuel Rosa, Lô Borges, Nando Reis
12.	"Tanto (I Want You)"	Bob Dylan (Chico Amaral version)
13.	"Saideira"	Samuel Rosa, Rodrigo F. Leão
14.	"De Repente (studio version)"	Samuel Rosa, Nando Reis
Total length:			...

DVD

1. "Belo Horizonte" (intro version)
2. "Renascença"
3. "Mil Acasos"
4. "Um Mais Um"
5. "É Uma Partida de Futebol"
6. "Esmola"
7. "Pacato Cidadão"
8. "Uma Canção é pra Isso"
9. "É Proibido Fumar"
10. "Presença"
11. "Amores Imperfeitos"
12. "Ainda Gosto Dela"
13. "Noites de Um Verão Qualquer"
14. "Jackie Tequila"
15. "Balada do Amor Inabalável"
16. "Acima do Sol"
17. "De Repente"
18. "Três Lados"
19. "Vou Deixar"
20. "Garota Nacional"
21. "Sutilmente"
22. "Vamos Fugir"
23. "Saideira"
24. "Resposta"
25. "Te Ver"
26. "Tanto (I Want You)"
27. "Dois Rios"
28. "Ali"
29. "O Beijo e a Reza"
30. "Canção Noturna"
31. "Tão Seu"
32. "Uma Canção é Pra Isso" (videoclip)
33. "Sutilmente" (videoclip)
34. "Noites de um Verão Qualquer" (videoclip)

== Personnel ==
- Samuel Rosa - lead vocals, acoustic and electric guitars
- Henrique Portugal - keyboards, acoustic guitar, backing vocals
- Lelo Zanetti - bass guitar, backing vocals
- Haroldo Ferretti - drums

Special guest

- Negra Li - vocals on "Ainda Gosto Dela"

Additional musicians

- Doca Rolim - acoustic and electric guitars, backing vocals
- Vinícius Augustus - saxophone
- Paulo Márcio - trumpet
- Pedro Aristides - trombone

== Certifications ==
Region	Certification	Certified units/sales
Brazil (Pro-Música Brasil)	2× Platinum	160,000^{‡}
Brazil (Pro-Música Brasil) DVD	Platinum	50,000^{‡}
^{‡} Sales+streaming figures based on certification alone.
