= O Samba Poconé =

1996 studio album by Skank

Studio album by Skank
- Released: 1996
- Studio: Mosh Studios, São Paulo
- Genre: Alternative rock, reggae, Dancehall
- Label: Chaos
- Producer: Dudu Marote

Skank chronology
Calango (1994)	O Samba Poconé (1996)	Siderado (1998)

Professional ratings
Review scores
Source	Rating
Allmusic	3/5 stars

O Samba Poconé is the third studio album by Skank, released in 1996. It includes the hits "Garota Nacional" (which was also released in a Spanish-language version, "Chica Nacional") plus "Tão Seu", "Poconé" and "É Uma Partida de Futebol." O Samba Poconé sold 1.8 million copies, with 800,000 in two months.

== Track listing ==
1. "É Uma Partida de Futebol" (Nando Reis/Samuel Rosa) - 3:56
2. "Eu Disse a Ela" (Chico Amaral/Samuel Rosa) - 4:14
3. "Zé Trindade" (featuring Manu Chao) (Chico Amaral/Samuel Rosa) - 4:07
4. "Garota Nacional" (Chico Amaral/Samuel Rosa) - 5:17
5. "Tão Seu" (Chico Amaral/Samuel Rosa) - 4:03
6. "Sem Terra" (featuring Manu Chao) (Chico Amaral/Samuel Rosa) - 4:39
7. "Os Exilados" (Chico Amaral/Samuel Rosa) - 4:05
8. "Um Dia Qualquer" (Chico Amaral) - 4:52
9. "Los Pretos" (featuring Manu Chao) (Chico Amaral/Samuel Rosa) - 3:59
10. "Sul da América" (Chico Amaral/Samuel Rosa) - 4:14
11. "Poconé" (Chico Amaral) - 5:18

== Personnel ==
Skank

- Samuel Rosa - vocals, guitar
- Henrique Portugal - keyboards
- Lelo Zaneti - bass
- Haroldo Ferretti - drums

Additional musicians

- Manu Chao - vocals on "Zé Trindade", "Sem Terra" and "Los Pretos"
- Toninho Ferragutti - accordion on "Poconé"
- Débora Reis, Graça Cunha, Kelly Cruz, Vânia Abreu - background vocals on "Eu Disse a Ela"
- Paco Pigalle - background vocals on "Los Pretos"
- Ed Côrtes, James Müller, Marcos Romera - percussion
- Chico Amaral, Proveta, Teco Cardoso - saxophone
- João Vianna, Nahor Gomes, Walmir Gil - trumpet
- Edivaldo Silva, Sidnei - trombone

Production

- Dudu Marote, Skank - production
- Chico Amaral - brass arrangement (except "É uma Partida de Futebol")
- Ed Côrtes - brass/percussion arrangement on "É uma Partida de Futebol"
- Guilherme Canaes - recording
- Michael Fossenkemper - mixing
- Leon Zervos - mastering
- Primo, Silas de Godoy - additional recording
- Steve Sola, Dominic Barbera - studio assistants: Soundtrack Studios
- Gauguin - technical consultant
- César Goulart, Marcelo Planetti, Tieta - production assistants

Design

- Gringo Cardia - artwork
- Jose Robles - painting
- Cláudia Stanciolli - art assistant
- Leonardo Eyer - CG, art assistant

== Album certification ==
Region	Certification	Certified units/sales
Brazil (Pro-Música Brasil)	Diamond	1,000,000^{*}
^{*} Sales figures based on certification alone.
