= Império dos Sentidos =

Studio album by Fausto Fawcett
- Released: April 1989
- Genre: Rap rock, post-punk, new wave, funk
- Length: 39:14
- Label: WEA
- Producer: Herbert Vianna

Fausto Fawcett chronology
Fausto Fawcett e os Robôs Efêmeros (1987)	Império dos Sentidos (1989)	Básico Instinto (1993)

Império dos Sentidos (Portuguese for "Realm of the Senses") is the second studio album by the Brazilian musician Fausto Fawcett. Like Fausto Fawcett e os Robôs Efêmeros, it was released by WEA (present-day Warner Music Group) in April 1989 and produced by Os Paralamas do Sucesso frontman Herbert Vianna, who also co-authored some tracks and played the electric guitar and keyboards. The album's title is a nod to Nagisa Ōshima's 1976 film In the Realm of the Senses; the title track uses samples from the film.

A concept album described as a "porno-futuristic opera", it closely follows its predecessor in terms of sonority and continuity; however, its events are not limited to the city of Rio de Janeiro – "Santa Clara Poltergeist" and "Androide Nisei" (a "sequel of sorts" to "Gueixa Vadia") are set in São Paulo, while "Facada Leite Moça" is set in Canada. One year after the album's release, Fawcett published a novel based around the Santa Clara Poltergeist character through Editora Eco. In 1992 he wrote a short story adaptation of "Facada Leite Moça", including it on his book Básico Instinto (not to be mistaken with the album of the same name).

"Cicciolina (O Cio Eterno)" is a tribute to the eponymous porn star. Actress and former model Sílvia Pfeifer also has a track named after her, and is featured in both the album's front and back cover; she was chosen by Fawcett because, in his words, she "epically embodies a certain sense of 'worldliness', and has an inhuman beauty that makes me want to create".

Império dos Sentidos would be Fawcett's last album to feature his backing band Os Robôs Efêmeros; for its 1993 follow-up Básico Instinto he formed another project, the "Falange Moulin Rouge" ("Moulin Rouge Phalanx"), to accompany him in his performances.

== Track listing ==
All tracks are written by Fausto Fawcett and Carlos Laufer, except for "Império dos Sentidos" by Fawcett, Laufer and Herbert Vianna; "Shopping de Vodus" by Fawcett and Vianna; and "Sílvia Pfeifer" by Fawcett and Marcelo de Alexandre

No.	Title	English title	Length
1.	"Império dos Sentidos" (instrumental)	Realm of the Senses	4:00
2.	"Facada Leite Moça"	Leite Moça Stab	6:00
3.	"Androide Nisei"	Nisei Android	5:01
4.	"Mapas Alemães"	German Maps	5:15
5.	"Shopping de Vodus"	Shopping Mall of Voodoos	2:38
6.	"Santa Clara Poltergeist"	Saint Clara Poltergeist	4:12
7.	"Cicciolina (O Cio Eterno)"	Cicciolina (The Eternal Rut)	3:50
8.	"Judith Raquel (Vedete Santa Uzi)"	Judith Raquel (Saint Uzi Vedette)	4:32
9.	"Sílvia Pfeifer"		3:43

== Personnel ==
- Fausto Fawcett – vocals
- Carlos Laufer – electric guitar, additional vocals
- Pedro Leão – electric guitar, additional vocals
- Marcelo Lobato – drums, additional vocals
- Marcos Lobato – bass guitar, additional vocals
- Herbert Vianna – electric guitar, keyboards, production
- Flávio Colker – photography
- Luiz Stein – cover art
