= Básico Instinto =

Studio album by Fausto Fawcett
- Released: June 18, 1993
- Genre: Rap rock, experimental rock, funk, funk rock
- Length: 42:22
- Label: Chaos
- Producer: Carlos Savalla

Fausto Fawcett chronology
Império dos Sentidos (1989)	Básico Instinto (1993)

Básico Instinto (Portuguese for "Basic Instinct") is the third and currently last studio album by the Brazilian musician Fausto Fawcett. It was released on June 18, 1993 through Chaos (a now-defunct subsidiary of Sony Music).

Unlike its two predecessors, Básico Instinto doesn't count on the participation of Fawcett's backing band Os Robôs Efêmeros; for this release he created a new project, the "Falange Moulin Rouge" ("Moulin Rouge Phalanx"), which was composed of many popular Brazilian musicians at the time, particularly Dado Villa-Lobos (of Legião Urbana), Dé Palmeira (of Barão Vermelho), Ary Dias (of A Cor do Som), Charles Gavin (of Titãs) and João Barone (of Os Paralamas do Sucesso). Fawcett's frequent collaborator Carlos Laufer was the only original member of Os Robôs Efêmeros to remain in the Falange Moulin Rouge. Pagode group Grupo Raça also made a guest appearance on the track "Pagode da Lourinha".

More elaborate, experimental and instrumentally diverse than Fawcett's two previous albums, he describes it as a "samba-funk revue" based on his two books Santa Clara Poltergeist (1990) and Básico Instinto (1992). After the album's release Fawcett continued to tour around Brazil with Falange Moulin Rouge until he decided to stop making albums to dedicate himself to his literary career.

== Track listing ==
No.	Title	Lyrics	English title	Length
1.	"Básico Instinto"	Alexandre Agra, Fausto Fawcett, Fred Nascimento, Luciano Kurban	Basic Instinct	4:40
2.	"Kátia Talismã"	Carlos Laufer, Fausto Fawcett	Talisman Kátia	4:13
3.	"Gisele"	Carlos Laufer, Fausto Fawcett		3:29
4.	"Regininha"	Carlos Laufer, Dé Palmeira, Fausto Fawcett		3:37
5.	"Numa Boate Qualquer"	Carlos Laufer, Fausto Fawcett, Marcelo de Alexandre	At Some Random Nightclub	2:55
6.	"Marinara"	Carlos Laufer, Fausto Fawcett		3:35
7.	"Santa Clara Poltergeist II"	Carlos Laufer, Fausto Fawcett	Saint Clara Poltergeist II	4:39
8.	"Pagode da Lourinha" (feat. Grupo Raça)	Carlos Laufer, Fausto Fawcett	Blondie's Pagode	4:23
9.	"Sodoma, Gomorra"	Dé Palmeira, Fausto Fawcett	Sodom, Gomorrah	2:34
10.	"K.G.L.R.M."	Carlos Laufer, Dé Palmeira, Fausto Fawcett		3:39
11.	"Te Adoro, Mas Não Tô a Fim"	Billy Brandão, Carlos Laufer, Dé Palmeira, Eduardo Lyra, Fausto Fawcett, João Barone, Paulo Futura	I Love You, but I Don't Feel Like It	1:13
12.	"Groove"	Instrumental (music composed by Carlos Laufer, Dado Villa-Lobos, Dé Palmeira, Eduardo Lyra, Fausto Fawcett, João Barone, Paulo Futura)		2:09
13.	"Básico Instinto (Vinheta Forró)"	Alexandre Agra, Fausto Fawcett, Fred Nascimento, Luciano Kurban	Basic Instinct (Forró Vignette)	1:20

== Personnel ==
- Fausto Fawcett – vocals
- Dado Villa-Lobos – electric guitar
- Dé Palmeira – bass guitar
- Carlos Laufer – electric guitar
- Charles Gavin – drums
- Ary Dias – percussion
- João Barone – percussion (track 12)
- Paulo Futura – DJ
- Marinara Costa – additional vocals
- Kátia Bronstein – additional vocals
- Regininha Poltergeist – additional vocals
- Luzia Maia – additional vocals
- Gisele Rosa – additional vocals
- Grupo Raça – additional vocals, arrangements (track 8)
- Carlos Savalla – production
- Jorge Davidson – art direction
