= Multishow ao Vivo =

Multishow ao Vivo is a special series aired by Brazilian TV station Multishow.

- Multishow ao Vivo: Dois Quartos
- Multishow ao Vivo: Ivete no Maracanã
- Multishow ao Vivo: Ivete Sangalo no Madison Square Garden
- Multishow ao Vivo: Skank no Mineirão
- Multishow ao Vivo: Vanessa da Mata
