= Fausto Fawcett =

Brazilian singer-songwriter and author (born 1957)

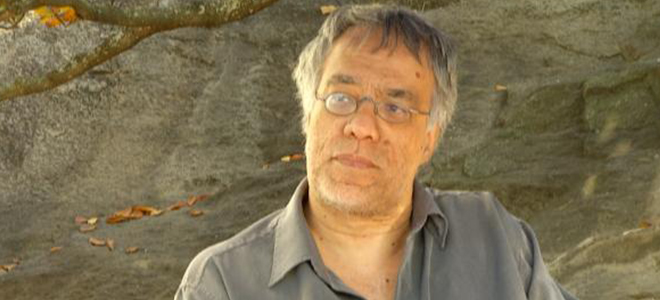
- Fawcett being interviewed by TV Brasil's talk show Diverso in 2012
- Born: Fausto Borel Cardoso; May 10, 1957 (age 69); Rio de Janeiro, Brazil
- Occupations: Singer-songwriter, rhythm guitarist, lyricist, novelist, short story writer, playwright, journalist, actor, screenwriter
- Years active: 1986–present
- Notable work: Santa Clara Poltergeist; Básico Instinto "Kátia Flávia, a Godiva do Irajá"
- Musical career
- Genres: Rap rock; funk rock; new wave; post-punk; experimental rock
- Instruments: Vocals, rhythm guitar
- Labels: WEA, Chaos

Fausto Borel Cardoso (born May 10, 1957), known professionally as Fausto Fawcett, is a Brazilian singer-songwriter, lyricist, novelist, short story writer, playwright, journalist, actor and screenwriter, famous for his frequent collaborations with fellow musician Laufer and for being a major exponent of rap rock and cyberpunk literature in Brazil. His best known compositions are the 1987 hit "Kátia Flávia, a Godiva do Irajá" and "Rio 40°", recorded by Fernanda Abreu in 1992.

== Biography ==
Fausto Borel Cardoso was born on May 10, 1957, in Rio de Janeiro. He graduated in Journalism at the PUC-RJ (where he met and befriended Laufer) in 1983, and in his free time used to perform short theatrical sketches which mixed poetry and music in clubhouses and cafés of Rio, under the stage name Fausto Fawcett – an homage to one of his favorite actresses, the late Farrah Fawcett.

He began his musical career in 1986, after listening to a suggestion by one of his college friends, filmmaker Carlos "Cacá" Diegues, and signed with WEA (present-day Warner Music Group) to release his debut album, Fausto Fawcett e os Robôs Efêmeros, the following year. Described as a "cyberpunk concept album that strolls through a Blade Runner-esque Copacabana", it spawned his most memorable song, "Kátia Flávia, a Godiva do Irajá", that would be included in the soundtracks of the telenovela O Outro and of the films Bitter Moon (by Roman Polanski) and Elite Squad (by José Padilha), and would also be covered by Fernanda Abreu. Its follow-up from 1989, Império dos Sentidos, produced by Os Paralamas do Sucesso frontman Herbert Vianna, is a "porno-futuristic opera" which follows closely the experimental and minimalistic sonority of its predecessor. A photograph of then-model Sílvia Pfeifer was used as its cover art.

In 1990 Fawcett published his first novel, Santa Clara Poltergeist, through Editora Eco. It was followed by Básico Instinto, a short story anthology, which came out through Relume-Dumará in 1992. Both books would later serve as the inspiration for his third album, also named Básico Instinto, from 1993. Afterwards he stopped making albums to dedicate himself to his literary career, although he still performs and collaborates with other musicians (such as Rogério Skylab, Dado Villa-Lobos, Fernanda Abreu and Samuel Rosa of Skank, with whom we wrote "Balada do Amor Inabalável" off the band's 2000 album Maquinarama). He also starred in the 2016 horror film Vampiro 40° as Vlak, a vampire who is also a drug dealer. The film was based on a TV series broadcast by Canal Brasil in 2010, Vampiro Carioca, which Fawcett wrote and by itself was based on the book As Aventuras do Vampiro Carioca, by Lúcia Chataignier.

As of March 20, 2023, Fawcett has published six books, the most recent of which being the anthology of theater plays Pesadelo Ambicioso; a further work, the "children's novel" Loirinha Levada, announced by him in the late 2000s/early 2010s, has yet to be released. In 2014, Santa Clara Poltergeist and Básico Instinto, which were out of print for years, were re-published by Curitiba-based Editora Encrenca. Encrenca also published a comic book adaptation of "Kátia Flávia, a Godiva do Irajá", drawn by Iuri Casaes. As of 2016 Fawcett is working on a feature film based on "Kátia Flávia" – Maitê Proença is being eyed for the title role. On an interview from January 16, 2017, he claimed he also planned a film adaptation of his book Favelost.

In 2018 Fawcett collaborated with pop rock band Leela on their digital single "2000 Light Years from Home" – a cover of the song by The Rolling Stones.

In January 2019 Fawcett reactivated his backing band Os Robôs Efêmeros, now comprising Laufer, Jodele Larcher, Gabriela Camilo and Fábio Caldeira, launching the "Cachorrada Doentia" show. It was his first performance in over 20 years.

== Personal life ==
Fawcett is a pop culture enthusiast, and shows it on his vast array of musical and literary influences; among them are The Rolling Stones, Sex Pistols, the Jovem Guarda movement, William Blake, Cruz e Sousa, Bob Kane, Anthony Burgess, Jean-Paul Sartre, Charles Baudelaire, Paulo Leminski, Clarice Lispector, Aldous Huxley, Jorge Mautner, Antônio Callado, Dalton Trevisan, William Gibson and Rubem Fonseca.

He was known for his heavy drinking in the 1980s, which made him develop liver and heart problems; as of 2008, he is a teetotaler.

He roots for the Fluminense Football Club.

== Discography ==
=== Studio albums ===
Year	Album
1987	Fausto Fawcett e os Robôs Efêmeros: Label: WEA; Format: Vinyl, CD
1989	Império dos Sentidos: Label: WEA; Format: Vinyl
1993	Básico Instinto: Label: Chaos; Format: CD

=== Guest appearances ===
Dado Villa-Lobos

- 2009: Jardim de Cactus (lyrics and additional vocals in "Faveloura & Lov")
- 2012: O Passo do Colapso (lyrics for "Beleza Americana" and "Overdose Coração")

Fernanda Abreu

- 1990: SLA Radical Dance Disco Club (lyrics for "Luxo Pesado" and "Venus Cat People")
- 1992: SLA 2 Be Sample (lyrics for "Rio 40°" and "Sigla Latina do Amor")

Skank

- 2000: Maquinarama (lyrics for "Balada do Amor Inabalável")

Rogério Skylab

- 2015: Desterro e Carnaval (lyrics and additional vocals in "A Árvore")
- 2016: Trilogia dos Carnavais: 25 Anos de Carreira ou de Lápide (lyrics and additional vocals in "A Árvore")

== Bibliography ==
- Santa Clara Poltergeist (Editora Eco, 1990; re-released in 2014 by Editora Encrenca)
- Básico Instinto (Relume-Dumará, 1992; re-released in 2014 by Editora Encrenca)
- Copacabana Lua Cheia (Dantes, 2000)
- Favelost (Martins Fontes, 2012)
- Pororoca Rave (Tinta Negra, 2015)
- Pesadelo Ambicioso (Numa Editora, 2023)
- Loirinha Levada (unpublished)

== Filmography ==
- 1987: Subway to the Stars – himself
- 2016: Vampiro 40° – Vlak
