= Ana Rosa =

Brazilian actress (born 1942)

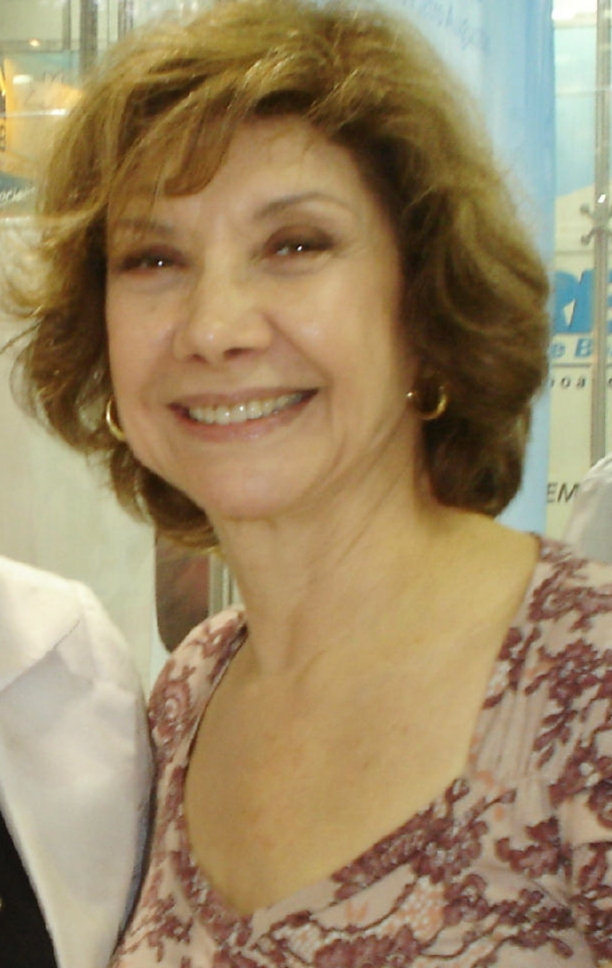
- Born: Ana Rosa Guy Galego; June 18, 1942 (age 83); Promissão, São Paulo, Brazil
- Occupation: Actress
- Spouse(s): Dedé Santana (1958–1962); Guilherme Corrêa (1962–1965, 1975–2006; his death)
- Children: 4

Ana Rosa Guy Galego (born June 18, 1942 in Promissão) is a Brazilian actress.

== Biography ==
Ana Rosa was born in New Horizon Theater Circus in the city of Promissão, São Paulo. The circus belonged to Captain Pepper Juvenal, his grandfather, and was the birthplace of his first artistic experience: the fifteenth day of life, little Ana Rosa was brought on stage during the presentation of theatrical spectacle "The world does not want me," in which represented a newborn baby abandoned. From there, follow the footsteps of her family and four years old, has played her character with the first lines. At nine years old, also has operations in theater, the actress also worked doing trapeze and numbers on the wire.

In 1958, he met the actor Dedé Santana, who became her first husband and father of her first two children. With Dede, toured as a dancer working with the Royal Circus Magazine. In 1960, Ana Rosa Santana and Dede Dawn opened the TV, in Brasília. At the time, appeared together, live circus acts and various teleteatros. After one year, were rushed to São Paulo, where Mauritius, the couple's first child, died of leukemia on February 14, 1961. In the same year, she and Ana Dede separated and went to Santos, where he returned to work in circus. Months later, the couple resumed and in April 1962, his first born daughter, Maria Leone, now 45 years. Some time later the couple separated for good. Ana Rosa had a total of eight children.

Also in the 1960s, Ana Rosa worked or revues with names like J. Maia, Fernando D'Avilla, Guinter Americo & Cole, Augusto Cesar Vanucci.

Starred in "Between blondes and brunettes," show that premiered in 1961 at the Teatro Jardel, in Copacabana, Rio de Janeiro.

In November 1962, Cole toured the Northeast with the show "Skins and naked." At the time he met the actor Guilherme Corrêa, who became her second husband. In 1964 were living in Porto Alegre.

During the 1970, 1980 and 1990, reconciled his work on TV with theater as "a window to the sun" and "The enemies do not send flowers," both of Peter Bloch, "The marginalized" by Wilbur Pereira de Almeida in Co. Dercy Gonçalves, "Physician to the force" by Molière, "If" by Sergio Jockyman; "round beds, couples square", directed by José Renato, "The shoes" of Millor Fernandes, directed Maurice Vaneau, "The Nonna", directed by Flavio, "Dona Rosita the single," Frederico Garcia Lorca, "Amor Brujo", directed by Roney Villela, "Defect and just start scratching," which was four years, "the wolves", directed by Pedro Antonio Borges. With invitation of Walmor Chagas, the actress joined the permanent cast of Theatre Ziembinsky (Rio de Janeiro), where he played texts as "Dear Friend" by Carlos Drummond de Andrade.

His career is intertwined with the history of Brazilian television. In 1964 he received the invitation of Cassian Gabus Mendes, then artistic director of TV Tupi, to star Alma Cigana. The novel was the first station's recorded on videotape and broadcast daily in prime time, soon became a great success.

After the excellent audience on his next novel, If the sea tell, the actress joined the cast of the TV show.

During a period of separation Guilherme Correa, Ana Rosa Jose Ricardo adopted in 1966, Marie Louise, and twins Joseph and Maria Leticia Rodrigo in 1971. In 1975, William Cooke moved back to St. Paul and the two resumed their marriage. In 1976, the first born daughter, Ana Luisa, who died at age 18 hit in 1994. At this time converted to spiritualism. In 1979, Anna and William were married officially. In 1981, Ana Beatriz was born, the youngest of eight siblings.

Ana Rosa worked at TV Tupi for 16 years, where he appeared in 28 productions and numerous soap operas, such as Vanguard TV, Comedy TV, Grand Theatre Tupi, among others. The actress belonged to the cast of the channel until January 1980 when the station failed.

Over those 40 years of career, Ana Rosa was also a pioneer working on other stations. In January 1982, by Sílvio Santos was invited to star in Destino, the first telenovela of SBT. The actress also appeared in productions of the former Network Headline, among which the novel Antonio Maria, production that opened in 1985, the studios of TV headline in Agua Grande, Rio de Janeiro.

Rede Globo, Ana Rosa made his debut in the miniseries Moinhos de Vento (1983), directed by Walter Avancini. At the station, the actress appeared in over 14 productions, including performances in Caso Verdade, Brava Gente, Você Decide, Retrato de Mulher and A Grande Família "as Genevieve, his girlfriend Blossom (Rogério Cardoso).

On television, Ana Rosa worked with directors such as Geraldo Vietri, Cassiano Gabus Mendes, Antônio Abujamra, Lima Duarte, Walter Avancini, Denis Carvalho, Paulo Ubiratan, Luiz Fernando Carvalho, Daniel Filho, Ricardo Waddington, Jayme Monjardim, Marcos Paulo, among others.

In 1997, along with William Correa made the adaptation of the book "Violets in the Window" by Vera Lucia de Carvalho Marinzeck to the theater and participated in its production. The show, which was watched by more than 156,000 people, still touring in Brazil. In 1998, Ana Rosa also took the challenge to run the show "The Chico Xavier Candide," which also remains to this day touring the country.

Also in 1997, the actress entered the Guinness Book as the record for number of jobs in soap operas recorded on videotape. As actor, supporting or cameo, Ana Rosa keeps that record today. Ana Rosa also acted in movies, where he worked on such films as Four Brazilians in Paris (1965), The Diabolical Heirs (1966), The Small World of Mark (1968), Geraldo Vietri, and Four Gunmen in Fury (1972), Edward Freund.

In the years that Ana Rosa completed its four-decade career as an actress, she celebrated the release of "This Mad TV and its Wonderful People" (Publisher Butterfly), which has its history and recalls their passages and curious stories lived on TV with testimonials from various artists and professionals.

The actress was widow, February 2, 2006, actor William Correa and lives with her youngest daughter Ana Beatriz Correa in Barra da Tijuca, Rio de Janeiro in the capital.

== Career ==
Television
Year	Title	Role
1964	Alma Cigana	Estela / Esmeralda
1964	Se o Mar Contasse	Zurá
1964	Quem Casa com Maria?	Maria da Rosa
1965	O Mestiço	Marina
1965	Olhos que Amei	Nádia
1965	Um Rosto Perdido	Débora
1966	O Amor Tem Cara de Mulher	Norah
1966	Os Irmãos Corsos	Emília
1966	O Anjo e o Vagabundo	Rosinha
1967	Encontro com o Passado	Luiza
1967	A Ponte de Waterloo	Kathy
1967	O Jardineiro Espanhol	Pepita
1967	Os Rebeldes	Helena Gurgel
1968	Beto Rockfeller	Cida
1969	Super Plá	Pepita
1969	Nino, o italianinho	Valéria
1970	Simplesmente Maria	
1970	Toninho on the rocks	Alice
1971	A Selvagem	Estela / Esmeralda
1971	Hospital	Ângela
1971	Nossa Filha Gabriela	Baby
1972	A Revolta dos Anjos	Nazaré
1973	Mulheres de Areia	Alzira
1974	Os Inocentes	Sofia
1975	O Sheik de Ipanema	Gigi
1975	A Viagem	Carmem
1977	O Profeta	Ester
1978	Aritana	Ana Maria
1982	Destino	Glória
1982	Conflito	Andréa
1983	Moinhos de Vento	Suzi
1983	A Justiça de Deus	Alice
1983	Vida Roubada	Daniela
1984	Santa Marta Fabril S.A.	Norma
1985	Antônio Maria	Rita
1986	Caso Verdade	
1987	Brega & Chique	Madalena
1990	Riacho Doce	Zefa
1991	Filhos do Sol	Doutora Lívia
1991	O Dono do Mundo	Nanci
1992	Você Decide	
1992	Despedida de Solteiro	Soraya
1993	O Mapa da Mina	Antonia
1993	Você Decide	
1993	Retrato de Mulher	
1994	Tropicaliente	Ester
1995	História de Amor	Dalva Paiva
1996	A Vida Como Ela É	
1996	Anjo de Mim	Marly
1996	O Rei do Gado	Maria Rosa Caxias
1998	Corpo Dourado	Camila
1999	Suave Veneno	Geninha
2000	Aquarela do Brasil	Salete
2001	Um Anjo Caiu do Céu	Laurinda
2001	Brava Gente	Rita
2002	O Beijo do Vampiro	Telma / Yolanda (Yoyô)
2002	A Grande Família	Genoveva
2003	A Grande Família	Genoveva
2003	Agora É que São Elas	Solange
2003	Kubanacan	Piedad
2004	Senhora do Destino	Belmira
2005	Essas Mulheres	Camila
2006	Bicho do Mato	Jurema
2007	Caminhos do Coração	Dalva Duarte Montenegro
2008	Três Irmãs	Virgínia Jequitibá
2010	A Cura	Graciema Guedes
2011	Morde & Assopra	Dinorá
2011	Fina Estampa	Celina
2013	Louco por Elas	Kiks
2014	Boogie Oogie	Zuleica
2016	A Lei do Amor	Zuza

Film
Year	Title	Role
1971	Diabólicos Herdeiros	
1972	Quatro Pistoleiros em Fúria	
1983	Sexo, Sua Única Arma	
2007	The Sign of the City	Biô Mother
2008	Bezerra de Menezes: O Diário de um Espírito	Bezerra de Menezes' sister
2009	Chico Xavier	Carmem
2010	Nosso Lar	Laura
2011	O Filme dos Espíritos	Gabi
2012	E a Vida Continua...	Lucinda
