= É Proibido Fumar =

É Proibido Fumar may refer to:

- É Proibido Fumar (album), a 1964 album by Roberto Carlos, or the title song
- É Proibido Fumar (film), a 2009 Brazilian film
