= Calango =

1994 studio album by Skank

Studio album by Skank
- Released: 1994
- Genre: Alternative rock, reggae, Dancehall
- Label: Sony BMG

Skank chronology
Skank (1992)	Calango (1994)	O Samba Poconé (1996)

Professional ratings
Review scores
Source	Rating
Allmusic	4/5 stars

Calango (Portuguese: tropidurus lizard) is the second studio album by Brazilian band Skank, released in 1994. It contains the hits "Esmola", "É Proibido Fumar" (a Roberto Carlos cover), and "Pacato Cidadão". Calango sold approximately 1.2 million copies.

== Track listing ==
1. "Amolação" (Samuel Rosa/Chico Amaral) – 2:35
2. "Jackie Tequila" (Samuel Rosa/Chico Amaral) – 4:10
3. "Esmola" (Samuel Rosa/Chico Amaral) – 2:38
4. "O Beijo e a Reza" (Samuel Rosa/Chico Amaral) – 4:59
5. "A Cerca" (Samuel Rosa/Fernando Furtado/Chico Amaral) – 3:28
6. "É Proibido Fumar" (Roberto Carlos/Erasmo Carlos) – 3:11
7. "Te Ver" (Samuel Rosa/Lelo Zaneti/Chico Amaral) – 4:36
8. "Chega Disso!" (Samuel Rosa/Chico Amaral) – 4:04
9. "Sam" (Samuel Rosa/Chico Amaral) – 3:45
10. "Estivador" (Samuel Rosa/Chico Amaral) – 3:24
11. "Pacato Cidadão" (Samuel Rosa/Chico Amaral) – 4:03

== Personnel ==
- Jarbas Agnelli – Art Direction
- Chico Amaral – Saxophone
- Everaldo Andrade – Assistant Engineer
- Guilherme Calicchio – Engineer, Assobios
- Jorge Davidson – A&R
- Vitor Farias – Engineer, Mixing
- Haroldo Ferretti – Drums, Bateria
- Roberto Frejat – Producer
- Ricardo Garcia – Mastering
- Gauguin – Producer
- Dudu Marote – Producer
- Renato Munoz – Engineer, Assistant Engineer
- Henrique Portugal – Keyboards
- Samuel Rosa – Guitar, Vocals
- Skank – Producer, Performer
- Marcio Thees – Assistant Engineer
- Ronaldo Viana – Production Coordination, Project Coordinator
- João Vianna – Trumpet, Trumpet (Bass)
- Lelo Zaneti – Bass, Baixo

== Album certification ==
Region	Certification	Certified units/sales
Brazil (Pro-Música Brasil)	Diamond	1,000,000^{*}
^{*} Sales figures based on certification alone.
