= Ana Lúcia Torre =

Brazilian actress

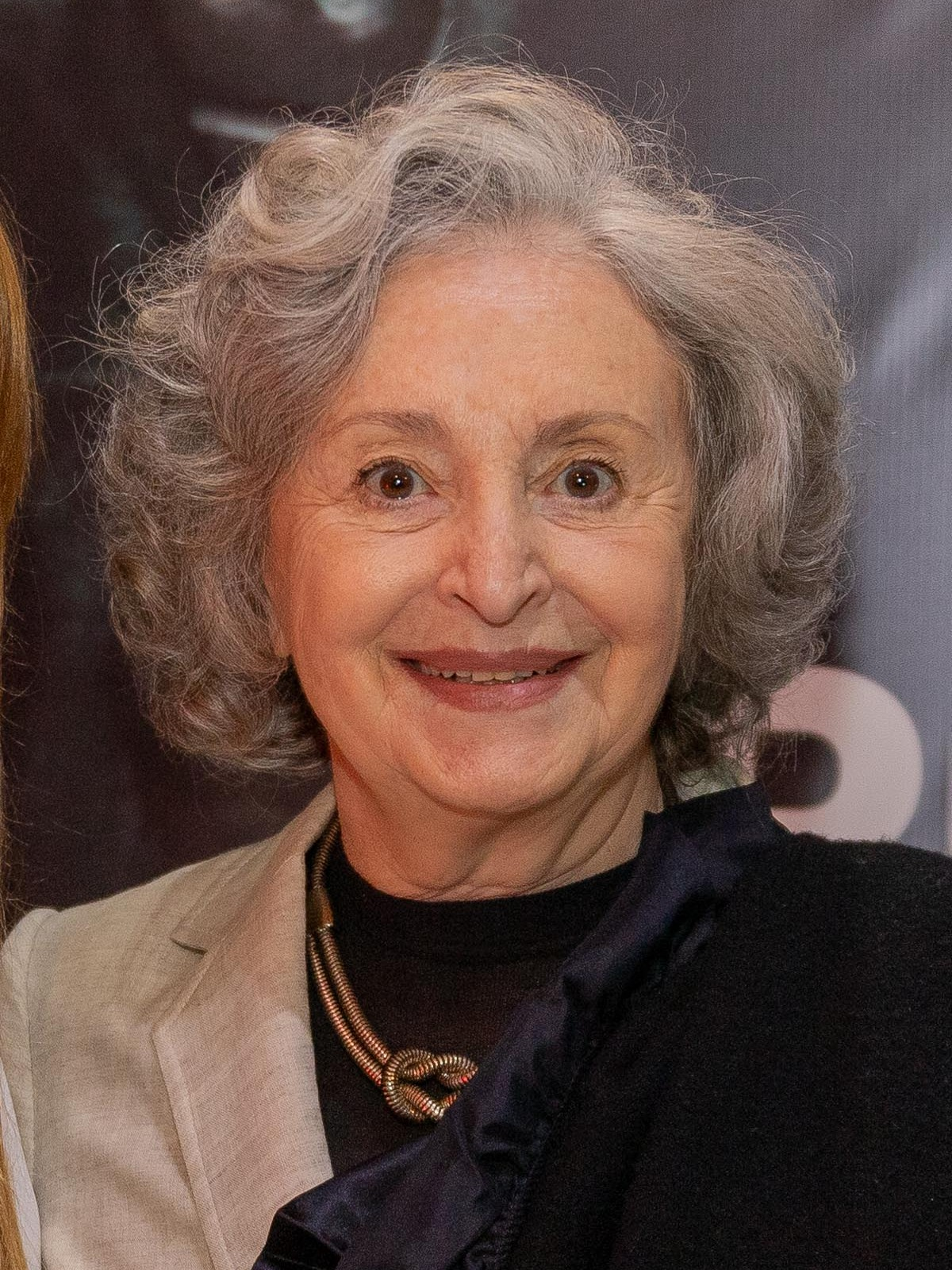
- Torre in 2023
- Born: Ana Lúcia Torre Rodrigues; 21 April 1945 (age 81); São Paulo, Brazil
- Occupation: Actress
- Years active: 1976–present
- Spouse: José Luiz Rosa (div. 2010)
- Children: 1

Ana Lúcia Torre Rodrigues (born 21 April 1945) is a Brazilian actress.

== Biography ==
Ana Lúcia Torre was born in São Paulo. As a child, her family moved to the city of Rio de Janeiro and then to São Paulo.

She began studying social sciences at Pontifical Catholic University of São Paulo in 1965 where she soon became interested in campus theater groups. The institution's director wanted only one theater group, which it raffled with the subscribers. Torre passed the tests that involved text decoration and creation of scenes and interpretation. The group assembled and reproduced the show Morte e Vida Severina. Among her university theater colleagues were musician, playwright and author Chico Buarque de Hollanda and artist Cláudio Tozzi.

Passionate about the artistic world, Torre switched from social sciences in 1966 to pursue a professional courses in theater in Lisbon. There, she lived in a student republic, funded by her parents. After a year and a half of studying, creating pieces and introducing herself, Ana Lucia met a Brazilian who became her first boyfriend and would be her first husband. In 1968, she married her boyfriend and they moved to Oslo, Norway so he could study maritime law. In this distant country, Torre learned Norwegian (and English), and worked as a hotel maid, a store saleswoman and later as a secretary of the Brazilian Embassy. After four years the couple moved to London for a year, where her husband continued his studies. She worked as an administrative executive at the Brazilian Aeronautics Commission. In 1973, they moved to São Paulo. She and her husband reunited a great pair of friends: theater director Celso Nunes and Regina Braga, parents of the actor Gabriel Braga Nunes. Celso invited Torre to act in the play Equus, and at age 30, Torre entered the theater professionally. After a few years, the couple divorced. She married twice more.

== Career ==
She has performed in theater plays throughout Brazil and abroad. In television she began her career in 1977, in Dona Xepa, where she played Glorita. One of her greatest roles in television was Debora, in the telenovela Soul Mate. She participated in productions such as the first version of Ciranda de Pedra, Tieta, Renascer, A Indomada, Cravo and Rosa, Alma Gêmea, The Prophet, Seven Sins, Faces & Bocas, and Foolish Heart. She acted in Amor Eterno Amor as Verbena Borges. In 2013 she appeared in Joia Rara. In 2015 she played Hilda in the telenovela Eleven Secret Truths. In the assembly for the theater of Death and Vida Severina, by João Cabral de Mello Neto, she won first place at the International Festival of University Theater.

She lived for seven years in Europe, then again in Brazil, where she starred in several pieces such as Seria Cômico se não Fosse Sério, a show that earned her the nomination for best actress for the 2010 Shell award.

== Filmography ==
=== Television ===
Year	Title	Role
1977	Dona Xepa	Glorita Camargo
1977	Sinhazinha Flô	Ermelinda
1979	Memórias de Amor	Princesa Isabel
1979	Marron Glacê	Stela
1980	As Três Marias	Norma
1981	Ciranda de Pedra	Celina
1982	O Homem Proibido	Olívia
1984	Corpo a Corpo	Olga
1987	Corpo Santo	Marta
1989	Tieta	Juraci Pitombo
1990	Brasileiras e Brasileiros	Clara
1993	Renascer	Quitéria
1995	As Pupilas do Senhor Reitor	Zefa Das Graças
1997	A Indomada	Cleonice Williams Mackenzie
1998	Serras Azuis	Dona Osória
2000	O Cravo e a Rosa	Leonor Fernandes (Neca)
2001	Porto dos Milagres	Salete
2004	Um Só Coração	Sálua
2005	Alma Gêmea	Débora Ávilla Saboya
2006	O Profeta	Inspetora Hilda Vieira
2007	Sete Pecados	Anja Guilhermina
2008	Casos e Acasos	Regina
2008	Xuxa e as Noviças	Sumara
2009	Caras & Bocas	Esther Abraham
2011	Insensato Coração	Anita Brandão (Tia Neném)
2012	Amor Eterno Amor	Verbena Borges
2012	Louco por Elas	Dra. Olga
2013	Joia Rara	Frau Gertrude Ducker Hauser
2015	Verdades Secretas	Hilda Brito
2016	Êta Mundo Bom!	Dona Camélia Batista
2017	O Outro Lado do Paraíso	Maria Adnéia dos Passos Fagundes (Adnéia)
2021	Quanto Mais Vida, Melhor!	Celina Monteiro Bragança

=== Cinema ===
Year	Title	Role
1981	Um Menino...Uma Mulher	Dona Rita
1982	Retrato Falado de uma Mulher sem Pudor	
1988	The Story of Fausta	
1991	Manobra Radical	
1991	A Revolta dos Carnudos	
2000	Através da Janela	Tomasina
2001	Os Xeretas	Alana
2004	O Vestido	Tia Adélia
2004	Como Fazer um Filme de Amor	Mãe de Laura
2004	Francamente...	Ângela
2005	Quanto Vale Ou é Por Quilo?	
2005	O Retrato da Felicidade	Psiquiatra
2006	Paid	Empregada
2007	Primo Basílio	Vizinha
2009	The Tenants	Diretora da Escola
2010	Reflexões de um Liquidificador	Elvira
2012	E a Vida Continua...	Brígida
2012	Meus Dois Amores	Vó Lindelena
2012	O Mundo de Ulim e Oilut	Bruxa
2017	Bingo: The King of the Mornings	Marta Mendes
2017	Através das Sombras	Dona Geraldina

== Stage ==
- Morte e Vida Severina
- Eles não Usam Black-tie
- Rose Rose
- Tartuffe
- Norma
- Arsênico e Alfazema
- Seria Cômico Se Não Fosse Sério
- Suburbano Coração (1989–1990)
- Como se Tornar uma Super Mãe

== Awards ==
Year	Award	Category	Indication	Results
1998	Prêmio APCA	Best Supporting Actress	Cleonice Williams in A Indomada	Won
2006	Prêmio Qualidade Brasil	Best Supporting Actress	Débora Ávilla Saboya in Alma Gêmea	Nominated
2011	Prêmio Extra de TV	Best Supporting Actress	Tia Neném in Insensato Coração	Nominated
2011	37º SESC Festival de Filmes	Best Actress	Elvira in Reflexões de um Liquidificador	Won
2011	Prêmio Contigo! de TV	Best Supporting Actress	Tia Neném in Insensato Coração	Nominated
2017	43º SESC Festival de Filmes	Best Actress	Dona Geraldina in Através das Sombras	Nominated
