= Skank (album) =

Studio album by Skank
- Released: 1992; 1993 (re-release)
- Recorded: July–August 1992
- Studios: Studio JG, Belo Horizonte
- Genres: Dancehall; reggae rock
- Labels: Nowboah (original release); Chaos/Sony Music (re-release)
- Producer: Skank

Skank chronology
Skank (1992)	Calango (1994)

Skank is the self-titled debut album by Brazilian rock band Skank. Released independently in 1992 with 3,000 copies, the album sold 1,200 in 45 days and drew the attention of Sony Music, who re-released the album on its new Chaos label. The album sold approximately 250,000 copies.

Skank had the hits "Tanto" (a Portuguese-language version of Bob Dylan's "I Want You"), "O Homem Que Sabia Demais", and "In(dig)nação".

== Track listing ==
1. "Gentil Loucura" (Affonso Jr., Chico Amaral)
2. "In (dig) nação" (Samuel Rosa, Chico Amaral)
3. "Salto no Asfalto" (Samuel Rosa, Fernando Furtado)
4. "Macaco Prego" (Samuel Rosa, Chico Amaral)
5. "Tanto (I Want You)" (Bob Dylan, Portuguese version by Chico Amaral)
6. "O Homem Q Sabia Demais" (Samuel Rosa, Tavinho Paes, Fernando Furtado)
7. "Let Me Try Again" (Caravelli, M. Jourdan, Paul Anka, Sammy Cahn)
8. "Baixada News" (Samuel Rosa, Chico Amaral)
9. "Réu & Rei" (Samuel Rosa, Chico Amaral)
10. "Cadê o Pênalti? (Jorge Ben Jor)
11. "Caju Dub" (instrumental version of "Salto no Asfalto")
