= Kátia Flávia, a Godiva do Irajá =

Single by Fausto Fawcett

from the album Fausto Fawcett e os Robôs Efêmeros
- Released: 1987
- Recorded: 1987
- Genre: Rap rock, new wave, post-punk, funk
- Length: 4:06
- Label: WEA
- Songwriters: Fausto Fawcett, Laufer
- Producer: Liminha

Fausto Fawcett singles chronology
"Kátia Flávia, a Godiva do Irajá" (1987)	"Juliette" (1988)

Music video
- "Kátia Flávia, a Godiva do Irajá" on YouTube

"Kátia Flávia, a Godiva do Irajá" (Portuguese for "Kátia Flávia, the Godiva from Irajá") is a song written and composed by Brazilian musicians Fausto Fawcett and Carlos Laufer, and originally performed by Fawcett on his 1987 debut album Fausto Fawcett e os Robôs Efêmeros. It was the album's first single, being followed by "Juliette" in 1988.

A major hit at the time of its release, it is considered the first Brazilian rap song ever, and is Fawcett's most famous composition; he himself has spoken very fondly of the song, claiming once that he considered the character of Kátia Flávia "his Batman".

== Background and composition ==
The song, which is permeated by military terms (even referencing the Exocet missile in a verse), narrates the exploits of the titular Kátia Flávia, an archetypical blonde femme fatale (a common trope on Fawcett's œuvre) who is constantly seen roaming naked around the carioca neighborhood of Irajá – thus referencing the 13th-century legend of Lady Godiva. In an interview, Fawcett stated that the character of Kátia Flávia was inspired by a real-life eponymous woman, whom he had read about in a newspaper; he then wrote a short story inspired by the news (subsequently included in his short story anthology Básico Instinto, from 1992), later adapting the short story into a song. A music video premiered on July 26, 1987, through Fantástico.

== Adaptations ==
A comic book adaptation of the song, written and illustrated by Iuri Casaes, was published in 2014 by Curitiba-based Editora Encrenca. Encrenca was also responsible for re-issuing Fawcett's books Santa Clara Poltergeist and Básico Instinto, which remained out of print for years after being originally released in the early 1990s.

In 2016 Fawcett has spoken about the possibility of turning the song into a feature film, with actress Maitê Proença in the role of Kátia Flávia.

== Appearances in other media ==
The song was included in the soundtracks of the telenovela O Outro and of the films Bitter Moon and Elite Squad.

== Fernanda Abreu cover ==
"Kátia Flávia, a Godiva do Irajá"

Single by Fernanda Abreu

from the album Raio X
- Released: May 5, 1997
- Genre: Pop, dance-pop
- Length: 4:34
- Label: EMI
- Songwriters: Fausto Fawcett, Laufer
- Producers: DJ Memê, Fernanda Abreu

Fernanda Abreu singles chronology
"Brasil É o País do Suingue" (1996)	"Kátia Flávia, a Godiva do Irajá" (1997)	"Jack Soul Brasileiro" (1997)

Music video
- "Kátia Flávia, a Godiva do Irajá" on YouTube

Fernanda Abreu, a long-time friend and also collaborator of Fawcett, covered the song ten years after its original release for her fourth solo album, Raio X. A critically acclaimed music video directed by Abreu's then-husband Luiz Stein received a nomination for the MTV Video Music Brazil award, in the "Viewer's Choice" category, in 1997.

=== Track listing ===
1. "Kátia Flávia, a Godiva do Irajá" – 4:34
