= Sílvia Pfeifer =

Brazilian actress and model

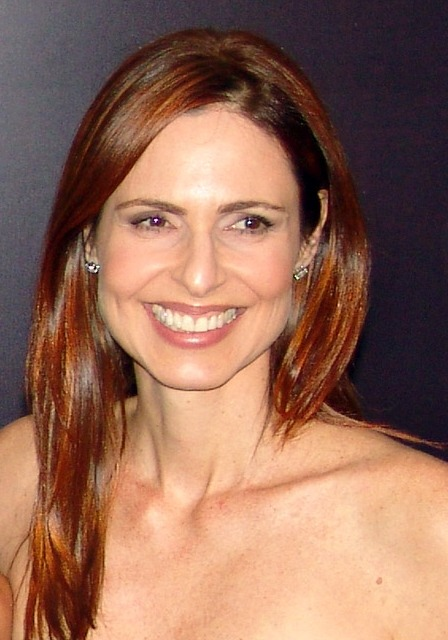
- Pfeifer in 2015
- Born: Sílvia Escobar Pfeifer; February 24, 1958 (age 68); Porto Alegre, Rio Grande do Sul, Brazil
- Occupations: Actress; Model
- Years active: 1970s–present
- Known for: Roles in O Rei do Gado, Torre de Babel, Top Model, and Meu Bem, Meu Mal
- Height: 1.80 m (5 ft 11 in)
- Spouse: Nelson Chamma Filho (m. 1983; div. 2021)
- Children: 2

Sílvia Escobar Pfeifer (born February 24, 1958) is a Brazilian actress and former model, best known for her roles in the telenovelas O Rei do Gado, Torre de Babel, Brilhante, Meu Bem, Meu Mal, and Top Model.

Pfeifer began her professional career as a fashion model in the 1970s, working in Brazil and abroad. She became one of the notable Brazilian models of her generation before transitioning into acting in the late 1980s.

She later established herself as a prominent television actress, particularly in productions broadcast by TV Globo, and has maintained a career spanning several decades in Brazilian television, as well as appearances in film and theater.

== Early life ==
She was born in Porto Alegre, Rio Grande do Sul, Brazil. She was raised in southern Brazil, where she spent her childhood and adolescence before beginning her professional career.

She completed her early education in Porto Alegre and remained in the state of Rio Grande do Sul until the start of her work in the fashion industry in the 1970s.

== Career ==
In television she began in 1990, for Rede Globo, acting in the telenovela Meu Bem, Meu Mal. In 1992, she made Perigosas Peruas. In 1994 Tropicaliente. In 1996: O Rei do Gado and Malhação. In 1998: Torre de Babel. In 2000: Uga-Uga. In 2001: O Clone. In 2002: Desejos de Mulher. In 2003: Kubanacan and Celebridade. In 2006, Pé na Jaca.

The actress Sílvia Pfeifer also made several miniseries, specials and series. In 1990, Boca do Lixo. In 1998: Você Decide. In 2002, Os Normais. In 2004: Linha Direta. In 2006: A Diarista. In 2008: Casos e Acasos.

In 2009, she moved to TV Record, where she worked on the telenovela Bela, a Feia.

In film, Pfeifer acted in the 1991 film Não Quero Falar Sobre Isso Agora. In 2000, in Le Voyeur, a short film, and in Xuxa Popstar. In 2004, in A Cartomante.

In 2016, she was hired by TVI.

== Personal life ==
She was married to businessman Nelson Chamma Filho, with whom she has two children, Emanuela and Nicholas. The couple divorced in 2021.

In 1992, she converted to Tibetan Buddhism and follower of 14th Dalai Lama.

Songwriters Marcelo de Alexandre and Fausto Fawcett wrote the song "Silvia Pfeifer" in honor of Pfeifer. The song is available in the track listing of the 1989 studio album Império dos Sentidos. A close-up of Pfeifer is the cover of this album.

== Filmography ==
=== Television ===
Year	Title	Role	Notes
1987	Sassaricando	Model	Episode: "November 9, 1987"
1990	Boca do Lixo	Cláudia Toledo	
1990	Meu Bem, Meu Mal	Isadora Venturini	
1991	Os Trapalhões	Marina da Glória	Special participation
1992	Perigosas Peruas	Leda Vallenari	
1992	Você Decide	Maria Rita	Episode: "O Sonho Dourado"
1993	Você Decide	Sandra	Episode: "A Sangue Frio"
1994	Você Decide		Episode: "Cinderela"
1994	Confissões de Adolescente	Tatiana	Episodes: "Essa Tal de Virgindade" / "Ainda Não!"
1994	Tropicaliente	Letícia Velásquez	
1995	Você Decide		Episode: "Intermezzo"
1995	Malhação	Paula Pratta	Season 1
1996	O Rei do Gado	Léia Mezenga	
1998	Você Decide		Episode: "Das Duas Uma"
1998	Torre de Babel	Leila / Leda Sampaio	
1999	Mulher	Sônia de Oliveira Schneider	Episode: "Mãe Menina"
2000	Uga-Uga	Vitória Arruda Prado	
2001	O Clone	Cinira Dantas	Special participation
2002	Desejos de Mulher	Virgínia	
2002	Os Normais	Selma	Episode: "Acordando Normalmente"
2003	Kubanacan	Amanda	Episodes: "July 22–August 16, 2003"
2003	Celebridade	Solange Sá	Episodes: "October 14–23, 2003"
2004	Inspector Max	Márcia Quintanilha	Episode: "O Soneto Mortal"
2004	Maré Alta	passing the vessel	Special participation
2004	Linha Direta	Edina Poni Melo Viana	Episode: "Crime das Irmãs Poni"
2005	A Diarista	Júlia	Episode: "Aquele da Cafeína"
2006	A Diarista	Teresa	Episode: "Marinete Não Chega!"; Episode: "Aquele da Chuva"
2006	Pé na Jaca	Maria Clara Botelho Bulhões Nozchese	
2008	Casos e Acasos	Ana Paula Gueiros	Episode: "Ele é Ela, Ela é Ele e Ela ou Eu"
2009	Bela, a Feia	Vera Ávila	
2012	Corações Feridos	Cacilda Varela de Almeida	Special participation
2012	Malhação: Intensa como a Vida	Marta Menezes	Season 20
2014	Alto Astral	Úrsula Barbosa	
2015	Totalmente Demais	Herself	Episodes: "December 22–24, 2015"
2017	Ouro Verde	Monica Ferreira da Fonseca	In Portugal on the TVI channel
2018	Que Marravilha – Aula de Cozinha	Participant	GNT Reality show
2019	Topíssima	Marinalva "Mariinha" Ramos Gonçalves	
2025	Dona de Mim	Rebeca	

=== Movies ===
Year	Title	Role	Notes
1982	Tensão no Rio	Model	
1991	Não Quero Falar Sobre Isso Agora	Raquel	
2000	Le Voyeur		Short film
2000	Xuxa Popstar	Vani	
2004	A Cartomante	Drª. Antônia Maria dos Anjos	
2006	O Caso Morel		
2015	Até que a Sorte nos Separe 3: A Falência Final	Nora Banks	
