= E a Vida Continua... =

2012 film directed by Paulo Figueiredo

- Brazilian theatrical poster
- Directed by: Paulo Figueiredo
- Written by: Paulo Figueiredo
- Starring: Amanda Acosta; Lima Duarte; Ana Rosa; Luiz Baccelli; Ana Lúcia Torre
- Production company: Versátil Filmes
- Distributed by: Paris Filmes
- Release date: 14 September 2012 (Brazil)
- Running time: 98 minutes
- Country: Brazil
- Language: Portuguese
- Budget: $2 million

E a Vida Continua... is a 2012 Brazilian drama film directed by Paulo Figueiredo, based on the book of the same name by the medium Chico Xavier.

== Plot ==
When the car of young Evelina (Amanda Costa) breaks on the road, she has no idea how her path will be deeply changed forever. Bailed out by Ernesto (Luiz Baccelli), Evelina soon discovers that they are going exactly to the same hotel.

Immediately they develop a friendship so solid that will persist when both leave to another dimension.

== Cast ==
- Lima Duarte
- Amanda Acosta
- Ana Lúcia Torre
- Ana Rosa
- Arlete Montenegro
- Carla Fioroni
- Cesar Pezzuolli
- Claudia Mello
- Luiz Baccelli
- Luiz Carlos Felix
