= Zezé Di Camargo & Luciano (1994 album) =

Studio album by Zezé Di Camargo & Luciano
- Released: 1994
- Genre: Sertanejo
- Label: Sony Music (Brazil); Columbia (USA)

Zezé Di Camargo & Luciano chronology
Zezé Di Camargo & Luciano (1993)	Zezé Di Camargo & Luciano (1994)	Camargo & Luciano (1994)

Zezé Di Camargo & Luciano 1994, or Zezé Di Camargo & Luciano IV, is the fourth studio album by the Brazilian country music duo Zezé Di Camargo & Luciano, released in 1994, reaching 1.6 million sales across Brazil and winning a diamond disk.

== Track listing ==
No.	Title	Writer(s)	Length
1.	"Salva Meu Coração"	Zezé Di Camargo	3:46
2.	"A Gente Fica Sem Se Amar"	Carlos Randall; Danimar	3:56
3.	"Depois Que Você Matar Meu Coração"	César Augusto	4:10
4.	"Te Amar Assim"	Zezé Di Camargo; Wellington Camargo	3:54
5.	"Por Amor Te Deixo Ir"	Joel Marques	3:09
6.	"Bandido Com Razão"	Zezé Di Camargo	4:09
7.	"Foi a Primeira Vez"	Cesar Augusto; Piska	4:18
8.	"Você Vai Ver"	Elias Muniz; Carlos Colla	4:00
9.	"Vem Cuidar de Mim"	Zezé Di Camargo	3:58
10.	"Sintonizo o Coração"	Tivas; Danimar; Carlos Randall	3:19
11.	"Madrugada Em Meu Olhar"	Cesar Augusto; Zezé Di Camargo; Fernando	3:46
12.	"Tente Outra Vez" (from the Brazilian release of The Lion King soundtrack)	Marcelo Motta; Paulo Coelho; Raul Seixas	3:40
13.	"Como Um Anjo"	Lucas Rhobles; Roberto Merli	3:37

== Sales and certifications ==
Region	Certification	Certified units/sales
Brazil (Pro-Música Brasil)	Diamond	1,000,000^{*}
^{*} Sales figures based on certification alone.
