= O Rei do Gado =

Brazilian telenovela directed by Luiz Fernando Carvalho

- Genre: Telenovela
- Created by: Benedito Ruy Barbosa
- Starring: Antônio Fagundes; Raul Cortez; Patrícia Pillar; Glória Pires; Sílvia Pfeifer; Fábio Assunção; Carlos Vereza; Walderez de Barros; Stênio Garcia; Bete Mendes; Lavínia Vlasak; Guilherme Fontes; Mariana Lima; Ana Rosa; Oscar Magrini; Jackson Antunes; Ana Beatriz Nogueira
- Opening theme: "Rei do Gado"
- Composer: Orquestra Terra
- Country of origin: Brazil
- Original language: Portuguese
- No. of episodes: 209

Production
- Running time: 60 minutes

Original release
- Network: Rede Globo
- Release: 17 June 1996 – 15 February 1997

O Rei do Gado (English: King of the Cattle) is a Brazilian telenovela written by Benedito Ruy Barbosa and directed by Luiz Fernando Carvalho that was produced and broadcast on Rede Globo, from 17 June 1996 to 15 February 1997, totaling 209 episodes and 130 in the original version of the SIC in Portugal.

== History ==
=== Synopsis ===
==== First phase ====
Occurs during the Second World War in the 1940s. In São Paulo, two families, the Berdinazzis and the Mezengas have a feud over land. It so happens that the children of the two families, Giovanna Berdinazzi and Enrico Mezenga, fall in love, going against the wishes of their parents, Giuseppe and Antonio. Giovanna and Enrico get married and have a son who is named Bruno, named after a brother of Giovanna, who died in the war and was a close friend of Enrico, despite the enmity between the families.

==== Second phase ====
Occurs in 1996, and Bruno is now a successful farmer, known by the nickname "King of the Cattle" for possessing a large herd. A man of simple habits, to whom the wealth is just something else, Bruno lives an unhappy marriage to Leah and has two sons, Mark and Leah. Upon discovering the betrayal of Leah with the driver Ralf, Bruno divorces her.

When having to solve the problem of occupation of their farms Pereira Barreto, a group of landless led by Regino and his wife Jacira, Bruno knows a day-worker called Luana. The two fall in love, unaware that they are cousins. He begins to find happiness until he meets her uncle - senior Geremias Berdinazzi - a powerful millionaire known as "King of Coffee and Milk" from Guaxupé Minas Gerais. Both man manifest intention of buying land which belonged to their past families. Even long after the rift between the Berdinazzi and Mezenga started.

The day-worker Luana, who lived at the landless camp, was Marietta Berdinazzi, the only niece of Geremias still alive, but long been missing. As he had no heir, the fortune of Geremias has always been an easy target for impostors. Suddenly comes a mysterious Marietta, appearing out of nowhere, saying she was the niece he was looking for. This woman is called Rafaela and she has eyes on the fortune of the producer.

The villain was able to keep all the post niece and heir of the family fortune, she also tried to make an attempt on the life of Geremias for him to die soon and not take her name off the inheritance. In reality Luana appeared and took what was rightfully hers. Geremias still ended up finding another nephew in Italy, the young Giuseppe who returned to Brazil and has inherited the fortune of the farmer with Luana.

Aparicio and Joe Bento, the two singers are passionate about the wilderness that decide to join to form a double hinterland, hence born Saracura and Firefly. Bruno's daughter, Leah, a young sweet and kind, Firefly falls for and against the wishes of the family, he leaves with the road to live their love in a bus followed from city to city.

But the son of Bruno, the rebellious Mark, a young man who was not worried about tomorrow, engages with Liliana Caxias, the daughter of Senator Robert Caxias and deludes the point of abandoning the child. A blow too hard for a dreamy girl who still had to live with the lack of attention his father, who only had their head fixed in the struggle of the landless.

== Cast ==
Actor	Character
Antônio Fagundes	Bruno Berdinazzi Mezenga / Antonio Mezenga (First phase)
Raul Cortez	Geremias Berdinazzi
Patrícia Pillar	Marieta Berdinazzi (Luana)
Glória Pires	Rafaela Berdinazzi (Marieta)
Fábio Assunção	Marcos Mezenga
Sílvia Pfeifer	Léia Mezenga
Lavínia Vlasak	Lia Mezenga
Carlos Vereza	Senador Roberto Caxias
Mariana Lima	Liliana Caxias
Ana Rosa	Maria Rosa Caxias
Walderez de Barros	Judite
Guilherme Fontes	Tavinho (Otávio)
Stênio Garcia	Zé do Araguaia
Bete Mendes	Donana
Jackson Antunes	Regino
Ana Beatriz Nogueira	Jacira
Sérgio Reis	Zé Bento (Saracura)
Almir Sater	Aparício (Pirilampo)
Arieta Corrêa	Chiquita
Emílio Orciollo Netto	Giuseppe Berdinazzi
Leila Lopes	Suzane
Jairo Mattos	Fausto
Rogério Márcico	Olegário
Oscar Magrini	Ralf
Iara Jamra	Lurdinha
Chica Xavier	Freira
Mara Carvalho	Bia
Luciana Vendramini	Marita
Maria Helena Pader	Júlia
Luiz Parreiras	Orestes
Amilton Monteiro	Detective Clóvis
Paulo Coronato	Dimas
Adenô de Souza	Lupércio
Carlos Takeshi	Olavo Takashi
Manuel Boucinhas	Giácomo Guilherme Berdinazzi
Roney Vilela	Genivardo
Cosme dos Santos	Formiga
Antônio Pompêo	Dominguinhos
Ilva Niño	Joana

=== Special Appearances in Round 1 ===
Actor	Character
Tarcísio Meira	Antonio Berdinazzi
Eva Wilma	Marieta Berdinazzi
Vera Fischer	Nena Mezenga
Letícia Spiller	Giovanna Berdinazzi
Leonardo Brício	Enrico Mezenga
Marcello Antony	Bruno Berdinazzi
Cláudio Corrêa e Castro	Tony Vendacchio
Caco Ciocler	Geremias Berdinazzi (young)

== Ratings ==
Timeslot	# Ep.	Premiere		Finale		Rank	Season	Rating average
Timeslot	# Ep.	Date	Premiere Rating	Date	Finale Rating	Rank	Season	Rating average
Mondays—Saturdays; 8:45pm	209	June 17, 1996	55	February 15, 1997	60	#1	1996-97	52

== Broadcasters of O Rei do Gado ==
=== Americas ===
- USA: Telemundo
- Mexico: Azteca 13
- Argentina: Telefe / Canal 9 Libertad
- Chile: Canal 13
- Paraguay: Canal 13 RPC (1998-1999) / Paravisión / Unicanal (2013)
- Venezuela: Televen

=== Europe ===
- Hungary: Magyar Televízió - M1 (1997, original airing), M2 (1998, rerun) and M3 (2015, rerun, currently airing)
- Slovakia: Jednotka (2000 – 2001, original airing), Jednotka (2002, rerun), Jednotka (2005, rerun), Jednotka (2007, rerun)
- Serbia: RTS 1
- Bosnia and Herzegovina: RTRS FTV
- Croatia: HRT1 (local title: Stočar)
- Portugal: SIC
- Russia: ORT
