= Maquinarama =

Studio album by Skank
- Released: 2000
- Genre: Alternative rock
- Label: Chaos
- Producer: Chico Neves (all, except 2, 5, 8, 11), Tom Capone (tracks 2, 5, 8, 11)

Skank chronology
Siderado (1998)	Maquinarama (2000)	Skank MTV ao vivo (2001)

Professional ratings
Review scores
Source	Rating
Allmusic	4/5 stars

Maquinarama is the fifth studio album released by Skank, in 2000.

With Maquinarama, Skank began to move away from the reggae-tinged "party music" that had been a staple of the band for the first four albums. The album sold 350,000 copies.

The song "Balada do Amor Inabalável" was also put to soundtrack album of famous Brazilian soap opera Laços de Família (The family ties).

== Track listing ==
1. "Água e Fogo" (Samuel Rosa/Chico Amaral/Edgard Scandurra)
2. "Três Lados" (Samuel Rosa/Chico Amaral)
3. "Ela Desapareceu" (Samuel Rosa/Chico Amaral)
4. "Balada do Amor Inabalável" (Samuel Rosa/Fausto Fawcett)
5. "Canção Noturna" (Lelo Zaneti/Chico Amaral)
6. "Muçulmano" (Samuel Rosa/Rodrigo F. Leão)
7. "Maquinarama" (Samuel Rosa/Chico Amaral)
8. "Rebelião" (Samuel Rosa/Chico Amaral)
9. "A Última Guerra" (Samuel Rosa/Lô Borges/Rodrigo F. Leão)
10. "Fica" (Samuel Rosa/Chico Amaral)
11. "Ali" (Samuel Rosa/Nando Reis)
12. "Preto Damião" (Samuel Rosa/Chico Amaral)

== Personnel ==
Skank

- Samuel Rosa - vocals, acoustic and electric guitars
- Henrique Portugal - keyboards
- Haroldo Ferretti - drums
- Lelo Zaneti - bass

Additional musicians

- Chico Amaral - flute on "Maquinarama"
- Tom Capone - bass on "Rebelião"
- Andreas Kisser - guitar on "Rebelião"
- Marcelo Lobato - vibraphone on "Água e Fogo", "Balada do Amor Inabalável" and cuíca on "Preto Damião"
- Ramiro Musotto - percussion on "Balada do Amor Inabalável", "Canção Noturna", "Maquinarama" and "Rebelião"
- Décio Ramos, Paulo Santos - percussion on "Muçulmano", "A Última Guerra" and "Fica"

Production

- Chico Neves - production (all, except 2, 5, 8, 11), recording
- Tom Capone - production (tracks 2, 5, 8 and 11)
- Mauro Manzolli - co-producer, mixing on tracks 2, 5, 8 and 11
- Florência Saravia - recording assistant
- Jacquie Turner - mixing (all, except 2, 5, 8, 11)
- Brandon Mason - mixing assistant
- Álvaro Alencar, Tom Capone - mixing: Estúdios Mega
- Bob Ludwig - mastering
- Frederico Toledo, Roberto Calixto - studio assistants: Estúdio Ferretti
- Guthenberg Pereira - studio assistant: Estúdio Mega
- Tomás Baptista - studio assistant: Toca do Bandido
- Bruno Ferretti - technician assistant

Design

- Kenny Scharf - artwork: Cadillac 1961
- Angelo Paulino, Fernando Furtado, Luiz Ferreira, Weber Pádua - artwork: booklet
- Marcus Barão - artwork: graphic project
- Carla Framback - graphic project

== Certifications ==
Region	Certification	Certified units/sales
Brazil (Pro-Música Brasil)	Platinum	250,000^{*}
^{*} Sales figures based on certification alone.
