= Zezé Di Camargo & Luciano =

Brazilian sibling sertanejo duo

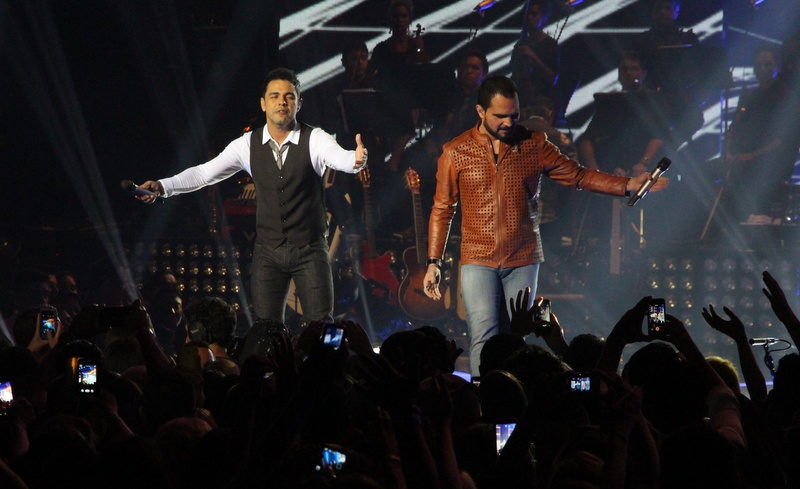

Background information
- Origin: Pirenópolis, Goiás, Brazil
- Genres: Sertanejo, pop, country
- Years active: 1991 - present
- Labels: Copacabana, Columbia, Sony, Som Livre
- Members: Zezé (Mirosmar José de Camargo); Luciano (Welson David de Camargo)
- Website: www.zezedicamargoeluciano.com.br

Zezé Di Camargo & Luciano (Portuguese pronunciation: [zeˈzɛ dʒi kaˈmaʁɡw i luˈsjɐ̃nu]) are a famous Brazilian sertanejo/pop/country duo. The two brothers were born in Pirenópolis, Goiás. Zezé is the artistic name for Mirosmar José de Camargo and Luciano the artistic name for Welson David de Camargo.

In 1991, their first LP exploded thanks to the hit single É o Amor, which was the year's most popular song and one of the most famous sertanejo songs ever. Their 1994 album featured a guest appearance from Willie Nelson on their version of "Always on My Mind", Eu só Penso Em Você. Until 2001, every album of the duo surpassed 1 million copies sold, including the 1995 one which sold over 2 million copies. In total, their releases from 1991 to 2000 sold 16 million copies. They are one of the best-selling sertanejo acts in Brazilian history, and beginning with their 1994 release, they began singing in Spanish as well. They also have the most lucrative recording deal in Brazilian industry with Sony BMG.

A Brazilian film made about the duo, 2 Filhos de Francisco, released in 2005, was the most successful Brazilian movie in 25 years.

== Discography ==
- (1991) Zezé Di Camargo & Luciano
- (1992) Zezé Di Camargo & Luciano
- (1993) Zezé Di Camargo & Luciano
- (1994) Zezé Di Camargo & Luciano
- (1995) Zezé Di Camargo & Luciano
- (1996) Zezé Di Camargo & Luciano
- (1997) Zezé Di Camargo & Luciano
- (1998) Zezé Di Camargo & Luciano
- (1999) Zezé Di Camargo & Luciano
- (2000) Zezé Di Camargo & Luciano ao Vivo
- (2000) Zezé Di Camargo & Luciano
- (2001) Zezé Di Camargo & Luciano
- (2002) Zezé Di Camargo & Luciano
- (2003) Zezé Di Camargo & Luciano
- (2005) Zezé Di Camargo & Luciano
- (2006) Diferente
- (2008) Zezé Di Camargo & Luciano
- (2009) Duas Horas de Sucesso (also released on DVD)
- (2010) Double Face
- (2012) Zezé Di Camargo & Luciano
- (2013) Teorias
- (2014) Teorias de Raul
- (2015) Flores em Vida (also released on DVD)
- (2016) Dois Tempos
- (2017) Dois Tempos - Parte 2

== See also ==
- List of best-selling albums in Brazil
- List of best-selling Latin music artists
