= Fernanda Abreu =

Brazilian singer (born 1961)

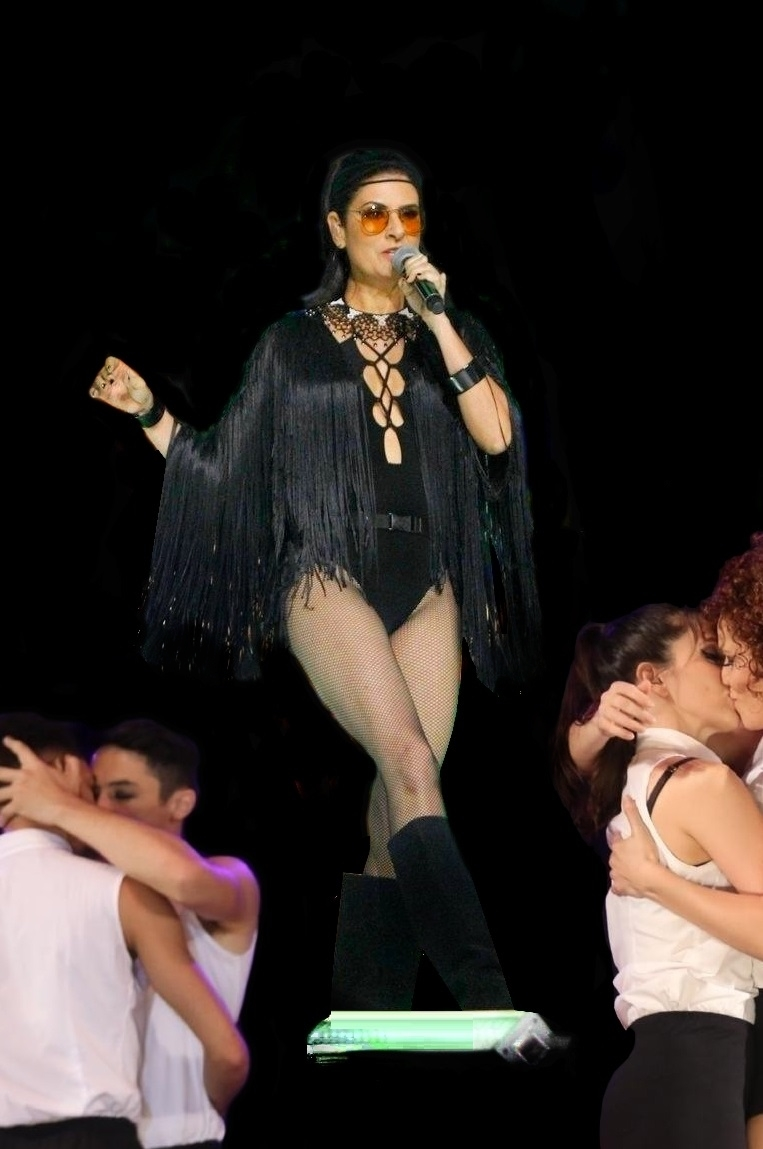
- Abreu in 2020.

Background information
- Born: Fernanda Sampaio de Lacerda Abreu; September 8, 1961 (age 65); Rio de Janeiro, Brazil
- Genres: R&B; pop; dance-pop; samba; soul; Brazilian funk
- Instrument: Singing

Fernanda Abreu (born September 8, 1961) is a Brazilian singer, composer and ballerina.

== Biography ==
Fernanda was born and raised in a middle-class family of the South Zone of Rio de Janeiro. Her first notable public appearance was the backing vocal of the band Blitz until 1986. After that, in 1990, she started a solo career, achieving great success in her native country.

In 1989, she met Herbert Vianna, and with his help and encouragement formed a funk band. Her first solo album, SLA Radical Dance Disco Club (1990), was produced by Herbert Vianna and Fábio Fonseca and had a hit with A Noite, composed with Luiz Stein and Laufer. Her second album, SLA2/Be Sample (1992), was one of the earliest Brazilian pop records to extensively employ the sampler, and had success with Rio 40 Graus, composed with Fausto Fawcett and Laufer, portraying Rio de Janeiro climate, people and lifestyle. Since then, Abreu has been considered the first lady of Brazilian funk.

In 1997, Abreu released the album Raio X, including a cover of "Kátia Flávia, a Godiva do Irajá".

In 2006, she released their first DVD MTV ao Vivo, which includes many of her hit songs.

Abreu is married to the musician and designer Luiz Stein and has 2 daughters, Alice and Sofia.

== Discography ==
Title	Details	Sales	Certications
SLA Radical Dance Disco Club	Released: March 17, 1990; Label: EMI; Format: CD, LP	BRA: 260,000	ABPD: Platinum
SLA 2 Be Sample	Released: April 20, 1992; Label: EMI; Format: CD, LP	BRA: 400,000	ABPD: Platinum
Da Lata	Released: July 5, 1995; Label: EMI; Format: CD	BRA: 100,000	ABPD: Gold
Entidade Urbana	Released: November 15, 2000; Label: EMI; Format: CD	BRA: 50,000	
Na Paz	Released: July 15, 2004; Label: EMI, Garota Sangue Bom; Format: CD, download digital	BRA: 50,000	ABPD: Gold
Amor Geral	Released: May 20, 2016; Label: Sony, Garota Sangue Bom; Format: CD, download digital	BRA: 10,000	

== Live albums ==
Title	Details
MTV ao Vivo	Released: May 29, 2006; Label: Universal Music; Format: CD, DVD, download digital

== Collected ==
Title	Details	Sales	Certications
Raio X	Released: July 14, 1997; Label: EMI; Format: CD	BRA: 150,000	ABPD: Gold
Perfil	Released: June 3, 2010; Label: EMI; Format: CD, download digital		
