= É Proibido Fumar (album) =

É proibido fumar

Studio album by Roberto Carlos
- Released: August 1964
- Recorded: June 1964
- Studio: CBS Studios, Rio de Janeiro
- Genre: Rock and roll
- Length: 28:30
- Label: Columbia
- Producer: Evandro Ribeiro

Roberto Carlos chronology
Splish Splash (1963)	É proibido fumar (1964)	Roberto Carlos Canta para a Juventude (1965)

É Proibido Fumar is the third album recorded by the Brazilian singer Roberto Carlos. Released in 1964 and produced by Evandro Ribeiro, the album includes some of the hits of the singer, such as "É proibido fumar" (later covered by Brazilian rock band Skank) and "O calhambeque".

== Track listing ==
No.	Title	Writer(s)	Length
1.	"É proibido fumar"	Roberto Carlos, Erasmo Carlos	2:31
2.	"Um leão está solto nas ruas"	Rossini Pinto	1:54
3.	"Rosinha"	Oswaldo Audi, Athayde Julio	2:50
4.	"Broto do jacaré"	R. Carlos, E. Carlos	2:12
5.	"Jura-me"	Jovenil Santos	2:07
6.	"Meu grande bem"	Helena dos Santos	2:11
7.	"O calhambeque" (Road Hog)	Gwen, John D. Loudermilk; Portuguese version: E. Carlos	2:21
8.	"Minha história de amor"	José Messias	2:20
9.	"Nasci para chorar" (Born to Cry)	Dion DiMucci; Portuguese version: E. Carlos	3:36
10.	"Amapola"	Lacalle, R. Carlos	1:52
11.	"Louco não estou mais"	E. Carlos, R. Carlos	2:13
12.	"Desamarre o meu coração" (Unchain My Heart)	A. Jones, F. James; Portuguese version: R. Carlos	2:07

== Certifications ==
Certifications for "É Proibido Fumar"
Region	Certification	Certified units/sales
Brazil (Pro-Música Brasil)	Platinum	250,000^{‡}
^{‡} Sales+streaming figures based on certification alone.

== Personnel ==
- Roberto Carlos: vocals
- Sérgio Becker: saxophone
- The Youngsters: many instruments
