= Promissão =

- Municipality
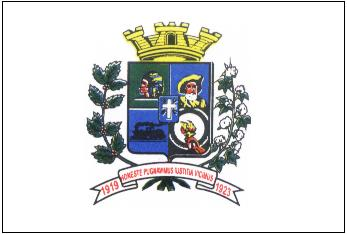
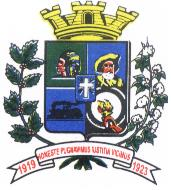
- Flag Coat of arms

- Location in São Paulo state

- Location in Brazil
- Coordinates: 21°32′13″S 49°51′30″W
- Country: Brazil
- Region: Southeast
- State: São Paulo

Area
  - Total: 780 km^{2} (300 sq mi)

Population (2020)
  - Total: 40,828
  - Density: 52/km^{2} (140/sq mi)
- Time zone: UTC−3 (BRT)

Promissão is a municipality in the state of São Paulo, Brazil. The population is 40,828 (2020 est.) in an area of 780 km^{2} (300 sq mi). Its elevation is 426 m.

== Media ==
In telecommunications, the city was served by Companhia Telefônica Brasileira until 1973, when it began to be served by Telecomunicações de São Paulo. In July 1998, this company was acquired by Telefónica, which adopted the Vivo brand in 2012.

The company is currently an operator of cell phones, fixed lines, internet (fiber optics/4G) and television (satellite and cable).

== See also ==
- List of municipalities in São Paulo
