= Skank (band) =

Brazilian band from Belo Horizonte

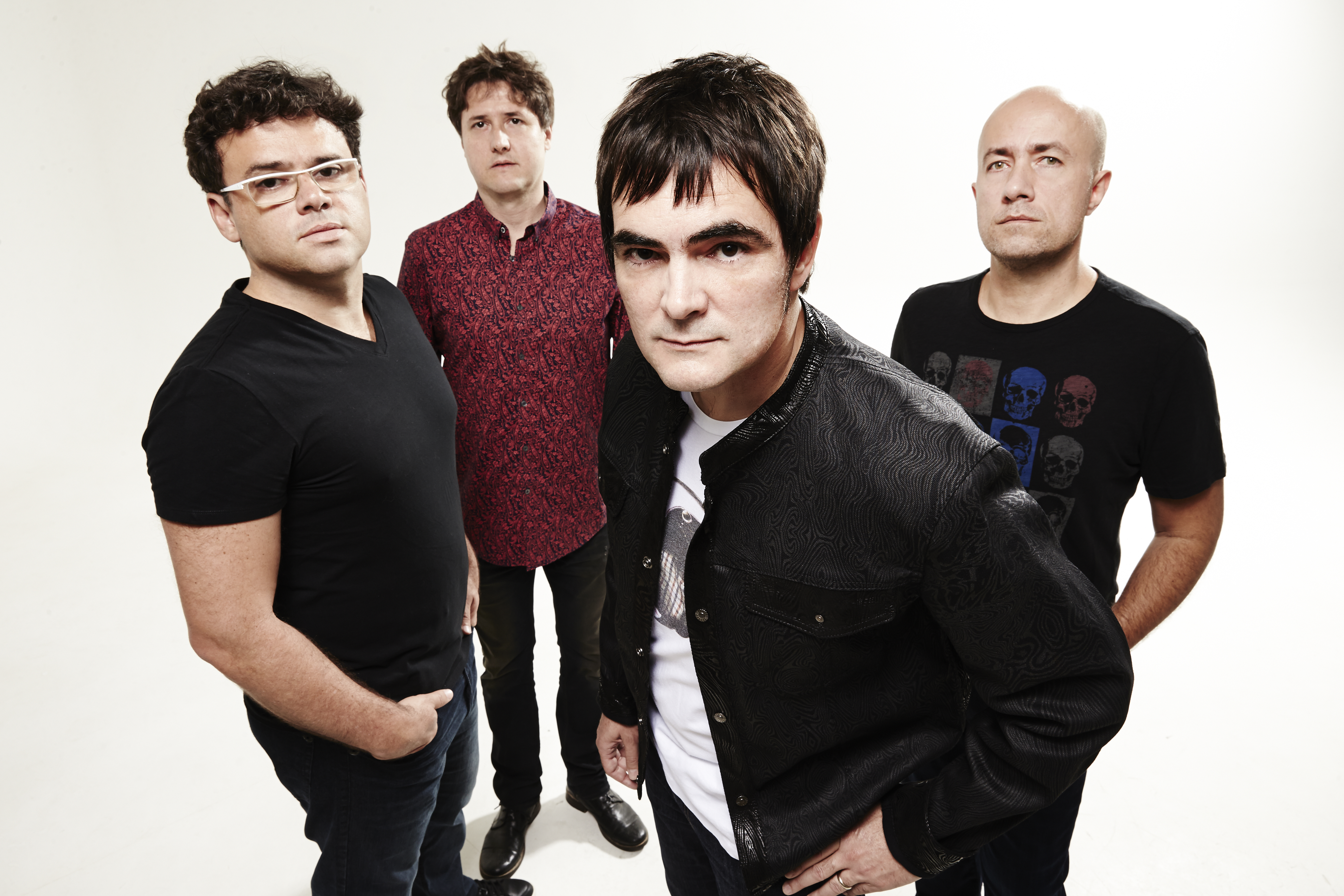
- Skank (L-R): Henrique Portugal, Lelo Zaneti, Samuel Rosa and Haroldo Ferretti

Background information
- Origin: Belo Horizonte, Minas Gerais, Brazil
- Genres: Reggae rock; ska; pop rock; dancehall (early); alternative rock (later)
- Years active: 1991–2023
- Label: Sony Music
- Past members: Samuel Rosa; Henrique Portugal; Lelo Zaneti; Haroldo Ferretti
- Website: http://skank.com.br/

Skank was a Brazilian reggae/rock band from Belo Horizonte. Having begun in 1991, they sold approximately 5,200,000 copies of their albums as of 2004. Initially intending to mix dancehall with traditional Brazilian styles, later the band changed its sonority to music closer to Britpop and local movement Clube da Esquina. Their last concert was held on March 26, 2023, at Mineirão, in Belo Horizonte.

== Biography ==
In 1983, Samuel Rosa (guitars, vocals) and Henrique Portugal (keyboards) started to play in a rock band called "Pozo Alto", along with Dinho Mourão (drums) and his brother Alexandre (bass). In 1991, Pouso Alto arranged for a performance in São Paulo, but due to the Mourão brothers not being in Belo Horizonte, bassist Lelo Zaneti and drummer Haroldo Ferretti were called for the gig. The band premiered on June 5, 1991, and due to the performance competing with the Campeonato Paulista final match, the audience was 37 people. After the show, the group changed its name to Skank, inspired by Inspired by skunk, a variation of marijuana, at the suggestion of a friend and the Bob Marley's song "Easy skanking", and began to perform regularly at "Mister Beef" churrascaria in Belo Horizonte.

After playing for some time in steakhouses, bars and clubhouses, the band spent US$10,000 in their first album, Skank, released as an independent CD in late 1992 with 3,000 copies, fully paid by the band members themselves. In 45 days, 1,200 were sold, and Sony Music signed the band as the first Brazilian act in its Chaos label. Skank was re-released in April 1993. The singles "O Homem Que Sabia Demais", "Tanto" (version of Bob Dylan's "I Want You") and "In(Dig)Nação" took the group on a 120 concerts tour around Brazil, and the album sold 250 thousand copies.

Calango (1994) was the first record produced by Dudu Marote. "É Proibido Fumar", "Te Ver", "Pacato Cidadão", "Esmola" and "Jackie Tequila" were hits, and Calango sold around 1,200,000 copies.

O Samba Poconé was released in 1996. The album had three big hits, "Tão Seu", "É Uma Partida de Futebol", included by FIFA in the official soundtrack for the 1998 FIFA World Cup, and "Garota Nacional", which topped the Spanish charts for three months (under the Spanish title "Chica Nacional"), was the only Portuguese language song in the Sony Music compilation Soundtrack for a Century, released in 1997 to celebrate the company's centennial, and took the group on tour in Argentina, Chile, United States, France, Germany, Italy, Switzerland and Portugal. Although "Garota Nacional" literally translates to "national girl", the song is not about the women of Brazil: it celebrates the "girls of Bar Nacional", a bar and nightclub in Belo Horizonte famous in the early 1990s for the beauty of its female patrons. Manu Chao featured in "Sem Terra", "Los Pretos" e "Zé Trindade". "O Samba Poconé" sold 1,800,000 cópias - 800,000 of those in two months.

Siderado, produced by John Shaw (UB40) and Paul Ralphes, begins the band's movement towards a more rock and roll sound. The Clube da Esquina-influenced "Resposta" (re-recorded in 1999 by Milton Nascimento and Lô Borges, the latter the song's co-author with Samuel Rosa and Nando Reis), "Mandrake e Os Cubanos" and "Saideira" were hits. Released in 1998, Siderado sold 750 thousand copies. Daúde and Uakti participated as guest artists.

In 1999 Skank recorded a Spanish language version for "Wrapped Around Your Finger" in a tribute album for The Police entitled Outlandos d'America.

With Maquinarama, the band begins in earnest its move away from the ska and reggae sound towards a more rock oriented one influence by The Beatles, Clube da Esquina, Britpop and contemporary alternative rock. Maquinarama, produced by Chico Neves and Tom Capone and released in July 2000, sold 275 thousand copies. Some of the hit singles were "Três Lados", "Balada do Amor Inabalável" and "Canção Noturna". The original cover shows a Cadillac with graffiti by Californian artist Kenny Scharf. The international version has a different cover.

In 2001, Skank recorded the first live album in Ouro Preto as part of the MTV Brasil's series "MTV Ao Vivo". MTV ao Vivo: Skank sold 600 thousand copies. Besides a list of hits chosen by fans through Skank's website, the album had the new song "Acima do Sol", a national hit. In 2002 Samuel Rosa played acoustic guitar in "É Proibido Fumar", from the Acústico MTV (MTV Unplugged) by Roberto Carlos.

Cosmotron, produced by Skank and Tom Capone, was released in July 2003 and sold 250 thousand copies - a disappointment next to their vigorous previous sales figures. Nevertheless, the album had many radio and ringtone hits. "Supernova", "Dois Rios", "Vou Deixar" and "Amores Imperfeitos" were the main tracks. Cosmotron won the Latin Grammy - best Brazilian rock album award in 2004.

Released in October 2004, Radiola was the first compilation album by Skank. It included four new songs, including the Gilberto Gil cover "Vamos Fugir". The cover reproduces a painting by the hyped Los Angeles artists the Clayton Brothers. Radiola sold 200 thousand copies.

In March 2006 Skank began recording the new album Carrossel in their studio in Belo Horizonte, with producers Chico Neves, who also worked in Maquinarama, and Carlos Eduardo Miranda, producer of O Rappa's Unplugged album. Released in August, the album had the semi-hits "Uma Canção É Pra Isso" and "Mil Acasos". Arnaldo Antunes ("Trancoso"), César Mauricio ("Lugar") and Humberto Effe ("Cara Nua" and "Notícia") were the songwriting partners.

In 2008, the band reunited with Dudu Marote, who produced Calango and O Samba Poconé, to record the album Estandarte in their studio in Belo Horizonte. Released in September, the album had low sales, but produced the hits "Ainda Gosto Dela" (featuring Negra Li), "Sutilmente" (a massive number 1 hit in Brazil) and "Noites de um Verão Qualquer."

On June 19, 2010, Skank performed a free concert on the Mineirão stadium in Belo Horizonte. It was the last event before the venue was closed to reform in order to accommodate the 2014 FIFA World Cup. The show was recorded for the live album and DVD Multishow ao Vivo: Skank no Mineirão, which featured two new songs, "De Repente" and "Fotos na Estante".

== International career ==
Skank had some success with "Garota Nacional", that lead the Spanish charts, and "É Uma Partida de Futebol" was shown before some games of the 1998 World Cup due to being in the championship's soundtrack. By the time of O Samba Poconé, the group toured through Hispanic America and Europe, and appeared in big festivals such as Super Bock/Super Rock 1997 in Portugal, Páleo Festival 97 and St. Gallen 98 in Switzerland, Montreux Jazz Festival 2001, and SummerStage 2002 in New York City. The group also played in two editions of Rock in Rio, at the 2008 Rock in Rio Lisboa and the fourth Brazilian edition of the festival in 2011. Skank had been previously called for Rock in Rio II] in 2001, but went out along with other Brazilian bands in protest against O Rappa's exclusion. However, the band never invested much in its international career. Some songs received versions in Spanish, such as "Chica Nacional" ("Garota Nacional"), and "Respuesta" ("Resposta"), but foreign shows are usually in places with many Brazilians, such as Miami and New York City.

== Members ==
- Samuel Rosa – lead vocals, electric and acoustic guitars
- Henrique Portugal – keyboards, Hammond organ, synthesizer, acoustic guitar, backing vocals
- Lelo Zaneti – bass guitar, synth bass, backing vocals
- Haroldo Ferretti – drums, programming, pad

=== Touring members ===
- Marcos Gauguin – electric guitar (1991)
- Chico Amaral – saxophone (1991-1998, 2017-2018), acoustic guitar (2001, on MTV Ao Vivo)
- João Vianna – trumpet (1991-1998)
- Ed Maciel – trombone (1994-1996)
- Edivaldo Silva – trombone (1996-1998)
- Ramiro Musotto – percussion (1998-2001)
- Jorge Continentino – saxophone (1998-2001)
- Wagner Mayer – trombone (1998-2001)
- Paulo Márcio – trumpet (1998-2023)
- Doca Rolim – electric and acoustic guitars, occasional backing vocals (2003-2023; some shows in 1992 filling in for Samuel)
- Pedro Aristides – trombone (2003-2023)
- Vinícius Augustus – saxophone (2008-2023)

== Discography ==
=== Studio albums ===
Year	Album
1992	Skank
1994	Calango
1996	O Samba Poconé
1998	Siderado
2000	Maquinarama
2003	Cosmotron
2006	Carrossel
2008	Estandarte
2014	Velocia

=== Live albums ===
Year	Album
2001	MTV ao Vivo: Skank
2010	Multishow ao Vivo: Skank no Mineirão
2012	Rock in Rio 2011 - Skank
2018	Os Três Primeiros

=== Compilation albums ===
Year	Album
2004	Radiola
2012	Skank 91
2013	Mega Hits: Skank

=== Video albums ===
Year	Album	Information
2001	MTV ao Vivo: Skank	Live performance (Praça Tiradentes, Ouro Preto, Brazil)
2002	Videografia (1994-2001)	Music video compilation
2004	Multishow ao Vivo: Skank	Live performance (Olympia, São Paulo, Brazil)
2010	Multishow ao Vivo: Skank no Mineirão	Live performance (Mineirão, Belo Horizonte, Brazil)
2012	Rock in Rio 2011 - Skank	Live performance (Rock in Rio IV, Rio de Janeiro, Brazil)
2018	Os Três Primeiros	Live performance (Circo Voador, Rio de Janeiro, Brazil)

== Awards ==
- Cosmotron won the Latin Grammy Awards - Best Brazilian rock album in 2004.
- Skank received the Premio Ondas in Spain as New Latin Group in 1997.
- MTV Video Music Brazil: Viewer's Choice in 1996 ("Garota Nacional") and 1997 ("É Uma Partida de Futebol"); Video of the Year in 1999 ("Mandrake e os Cubanos"); Pop Video in 1996 ("Garota Nacional"), 1997 ("É Uma Partida de Futebol"), 1999 ("Mandrake e os Cubanos"), 2000 ("Três Lados"), 2003 ("Dois Rios") and 2004 ("Vou Deixar").

Awards and achievements
Preceded by Os Paralamas do Sucesso	Latin Grammy Award for Best Brazilian Rock Album; 2004	Succeeded by Charlie Brown Jr.
