= Laufer (musician) =

Brazilian musician

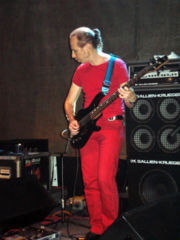

Background information
- Born: Carlos Laufer; Rio de Janeiro, Brazil
- Genres: Rap rock, new wave, rock
- Occupations: Musician, songwriter, record producer
- Instruments: Bass guitar, electric guitar
- Years active: 1986–present

Carlos Laufer, better known mononymously as Laufer, is a Brazilian musician, songwriter and record producer.

He was born in Rio de Janeiro and studied at the PUC-RJ, where he met and befriended Fausto Fawcett. Fawcett then invited him to be a part of his band Os Robôs Efêmeros in 1986, thus beginning their prolific partnership; Laufer co-wrote most, if not all, of Fawcett's songs, the most famous of which being his 1987 hit "Kátia Flávia, a Godiva do Irajá". After Os Robôs Efêmeros was made dormant in the early 1990s, Laufer was the only original member to return to Fawcett's new project, Falange Moulin Rouge. He and Fawcett also collaborated with Fernanda Abreu, writing her 1992 song "Rio 40°".

Beginning in the late 1990s Laufer became a music producer for film scores: his first work was in the score of the cult 1998 film Como Ser Solteiro, by Rosane Svartman. In 2010 he produced the score of Malu de Bicicleta alongside also frequent collaborator Dado Villa-Lobos of Legião Urbana fame; Laufer produced the musician's first two albums, and occasionally serves as his guest musician on live shows.

Following Fawcett's reactivation of Os Robôs Efêmeros in January 2019, Laufer returned to the band as its guitarist.
