= Pro-Música Brasil =

Brazilian music industry association

- Formation: April 1958; 67 years ago
- Type: NGO
- Legal status: Association
- Purpose: Trade organization protecting music production companies' interests
- Headquarters: Rio de Janeiro
- Location: Brazil
- President: Paulo Rosa
- Affiliations: IFPI
- Website: pro-musicabr.org

Pro-Música Brasil (PMB), previously Associação Brasileira dos Produtores de Discos (ABPD) (English: Brazilian Association of Record Producers), is an official representative body of the record labels in the Brazilian phonographic market.

== History ==
The Brazilian Association of Record Producers, ABPD, was set up in April 1958 and represents the largest phonogram producers established in Brazil. In 2016, the ABPD was renamed Pro-Música Brasil.

== Activities ==
The priorities of the ABPD are to develop conditions to assist the industry in preserving the music market and developing new markets and music marketing technologies, as well as fighting online piracy and promoting appropriate legislation in the areas of copyright and neighboring rights, in addition to promoting awareness of music as a cultural and economic value. Furthermore, the ABPD is engaged in conciliating the interests of the companies it represents with those of other title-holders in the area of copyright, as well as gathering statistical data and conducting market research and surveys. The ABPD is affiliated with the umbrella association, the International Federation of the Phonographic Industry (IFPI), with over 1,400 member companies in 66 countries.

The ABPD is also responsible for the issuance of certification awards authorized by recording companies, in recognition of the work of performers, through the awarding of "special discs", i.e. Gold, Platinum and Diamond Discs, for units sold. In the anti-piracy area, the ABPD established the "Association for the Protection of the Intellectual Property Rights of the Phonographic Industry", APDIF, in 1995, and this body is involved since then in the fight against music piracy in their operational, logistic and legal aspects.

== Affiliates ==
All companies associated with Pro-Música Brasil:

- EMI-Odeon, EMI Fênix, EMI Jangada, EMI Imperador - EMI Music - EMI Records.
- Microservice Tecnologia Digital.
- MK Music.
- Edições Paulinas.
- Record Produções e Gravações Ltda.
- Line Records.
- New Music.
- Som Livre.
- Sony Music.
- Universal Music.
- Walt Disney Records.
- Warner Music.
- Continental EastWest.

== Sales certification ==
Before 1990, there were no music certification award in Brazil. Following that, the certification levels were:

=== Brazilian (domestic) artists ===
CD

Certification	Until 2003	2004-2005	2006-2009	Since 2010
Gold	100,000	50,000	50,000	40,000
Platinum	250,000	125,000	100,000	80,000
Double Platinum	500,000	250,000	200,000	160,000
Triple Platinum	750,000	375,000	300,000	240,000
Diamond	1,000,000	500,000	500,000	300,000

DVD

Certification	Until 2005	Since 2006
Gold	25,000	25,000
Platinum	50,000	50,000
Double Platinum	—	100,000
Triple Platinum	—	150,000
Diamond	100,000	250,000

=== International artists ===
CD

Certification	Until 2000	2001-2005	2006-2009	Since 2010
Gold	100,000	50,000	30,000	20,000
Platinum	250,000	125,000	60,000	40,000
Double Platinum	500,000	250,000	120,000	80,000
Triple Platinum	750,000	375,000	180,000	120,000
Diamond	1,000,000	500,000	250,000	160,000

DVD

Certification	Until 2005	Since 2006
Gold	25,000	15,000
Platinum	50,000	30,000
Double Platinum	—	60,000
Triple Platinum	—	90,000
Diamond	100,000	125,000

=== Digital media certification ===
From November 2008, digital media sales were also certified by APBD with the following certification levels:

Domestic

- Gold: 50,000
- Platinum: 100,000
- Diamond: 500,000

International

- Gold: 30,000
- Platinum: 60,000
- Diamond: 250,000

Digital certifications were active for both albums (digital álbum, or DAL) and singles (digital música or DMS), using the same certification levels. Physical CD sales continued to be certified separately. The last digital certification for singles was awarded by APBD in 2013 while the last digital album was thus certified in 2015.

Starting in 2017, the certifications for digital sales were united with those of actual sales with the following rules. For the sake of album certifications, paid digital downloads of full albums are equal to a physical album sale. Paid digital downloads of singles from the album are also counted for album certification, where ten singles downloads are equivalent to one album sale. For audio and video streams of one or more tracks in the album, 5,000 streams are equivalent to one album. Single certifications are based on digital download. For audio and video streaming, 500 streams are equal to one download. The thresholds for both album and single certifications are the ones previously assigned to CDs.

== List of Diamond certified albums ==
The following is a list of albums that have been certified Diamond or more by Pro-Música Brasil (and previously Associação Brasileira dos Produtores de Discos).

=== Quadruple Diamond ===
- Ágape Musical
- 1989

=== Triple Diamond ===
- 21
- Músicas para Louvar ao Senhor
- Só Pra Contrariar
- Xou da Xuxa 3 (album)

=== Double Diamond ===
- Xou da Xuxa (album)
- Xegundo Xou da Xuxa (album)
- Adele: Live at the Royal Albert Hall
- As Quatro Estações
- É o Tchan do Brasil
- Extraordinário Amor de Deus
- I Am... Sasha Fierce
- Marília Mendonça - Ao Vivo
- Minha Benção
- Na Cabeça e na Cintura
- O que é que eu sou sem Jesus?
- Paula Fernandes ao Vivo
- Terra Samba ao Vivo e a Cores
- Todos os Cantos Vol. 1 (Marília Mendonça)
- Vida

=== Diamond ===
- 25
- Acústico - Ao Vivo (Bruno & Marrone)
- Acústico MTV (Cássia Eller)
- Acustico MTV (Kid Abelha)
- Acústico MTV (Legião Urbana)
- Acústico MTV (Roberto Carlos)
- Acústico MTV (Titãs)
- Ágape Amor Divino
- Águas Purificadoras
- Alô
- Amor sem Limite
- Ao Vivo Em Campo Grande
- Ao Vivo Em Goiânia
- As Super Novas
- Back to Black
- Banda Eva Ao Vivo
- Bang
- Beyoncé
- Bita e os Animais
- Brincadeira de Criança
- Bruno & Marrone Ao Vivo
- Calango
- Camila
- Clássicos Sertanejos
- Conquistas
- O Canto da Cidade
- O Céu Explica Tudo
- O Clone Internacional
- Como. Sempre Feito. Nunca
- Daniel
- Deixa Entrar
- É o Tchan no Hawaí
- O Embaixador (Ao Vivo)
- Equilíbrio Distante
- Galinha Pintadinha 4
- Hit Me Hard and Soft
- Inevitável
- Kisses
- KLB
- Laços de Família Internacional
- Leandro & Leonardo Vol. 7
- O Maior Troféu
- Mamonas Assassinas
- Memórias, Crônicas, e Declarações de Amor
- Meu Presente é Você
- Motion
- MTV ao Vivo (Ivete Sangalo)
- My Worlds
- Perfil
- Preciso de Ti
- Prenda Minha
- O Samba Poconé
- Quatro Estações Ao Vivo
- Que País É Este
- Renaissance
- Roberto Carlos (1995)
- Roberto Carlos (1996)
- Sale el Sol
- Sexto Sentido
- Som de Adoradores
- SOS
- Tá Delicia Tá Gostoso
- Terra do Nunca
- Tem Moda Pra Tudo
- Thank U, Next
- Toca Lulu
- Torre de Babel Internacional
- Tribalistas
- Um Presente Para Jesus
- Um Sonhador
- Vibras
- Versions of Me
- Xuxa 5 (album)
- Zezé Di Camargo & Luciano 1993
- Zezé Di Camargo & Luciano 1994
- Zezé Di Camargo & Luciano 1995
- Zezé Di Camargo & Luciano 1996
- Zezé Di Camargo & Luciano 1997
- Zezé Di Camargo & Luciano 1998
- Zezé Di Camargo & Luciano 1999
- Zezé Di Camargo & Luciano 2000
