= Samuel Rosa (musician) =

Brazilian rock singer and guitarist

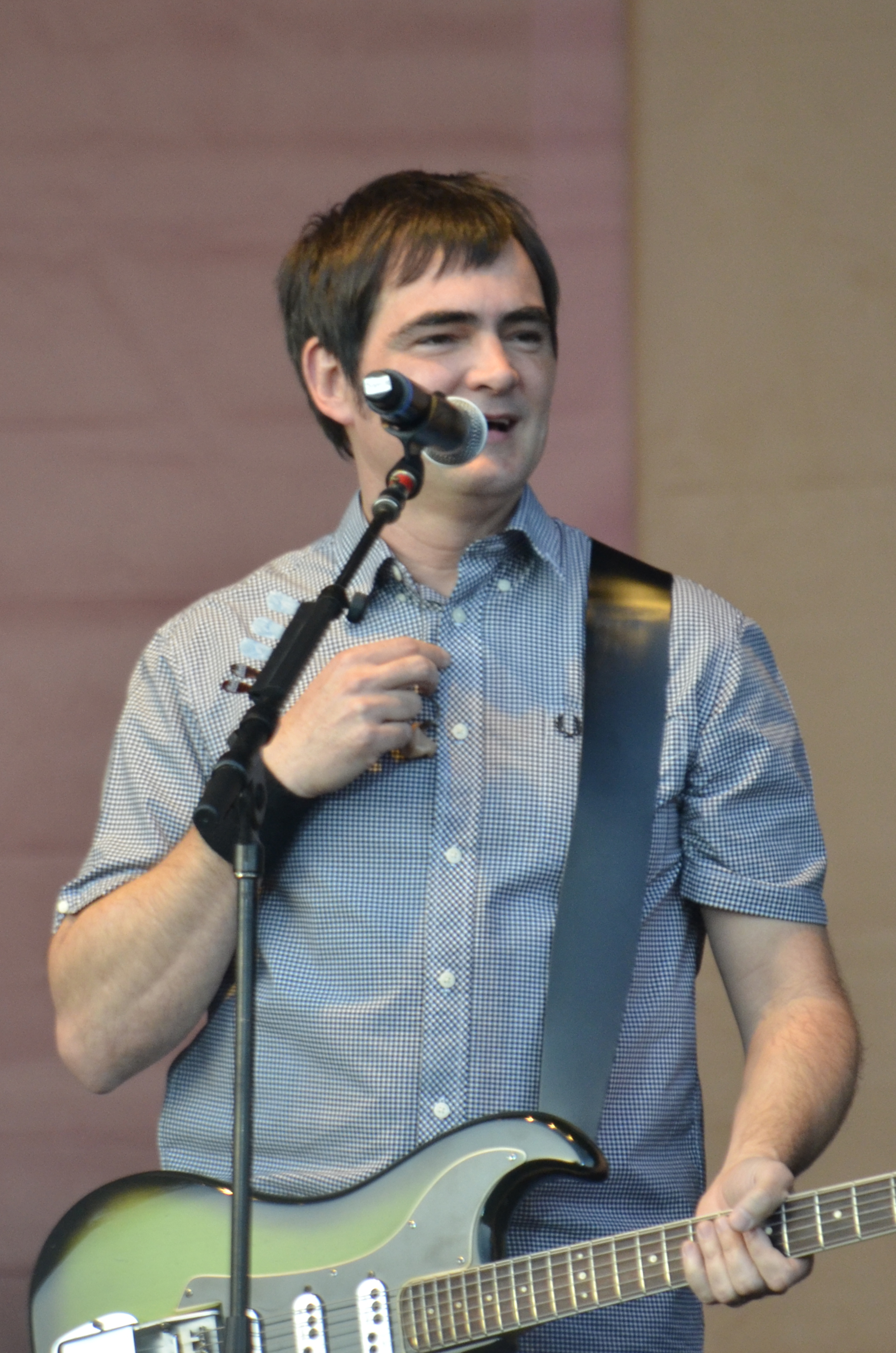
- Samuel Rosa

Background information
- Born: Samuel Rosa de Alvarenga; July 15, 1966 (age 60); Belo Horizonte, Minas Gerais, Brazil
- Genres: Pop rock, reggae, ska
- Occupations: Musician; singer; songwriter; composer
- Instruments: Vocals, guitar
- Years active: 1991–present
- Labels: Epic, Sony Music
- Formerly of: Skank

Samuel Rosa de Alvarenga (born July 15, 1966) is the former lead singer, primary composer and guitarist of Brazilian rock band Skank. He has a psychology degree from Universidade Federal de Minas Gerais.

Samuel writes the music for most of the group's songs, with 80% of the lyrics by Chico Amaral. Other songwriting partners were Nando Reis, Arnaldo Antunes, and Lô Borges.

Samuel is a football fan and supports Cruzeiro.

His album Rosa was included in the list of 50 best albums of 2024 by the São Paulo Art Critics Association.
