= Timeline of sustainable energy research 2020 to the present =

This timeline of sustainable energy research from 2020 to the present documents research and development in renewable energy, solar energy, and nuclear energy, particularly regarding energy production that is sustainable within the Earth system.

Renewable energy capacity has steadily grown, led by solar photovoltaic power.

Events currently not included in the timelines include:

- goal-codifying policy about, commercialization of, adoptions of, deployment-statistics of, announced developments of, announced funding for and dissemination of sustainable energy -technologies and -infrastructure/systems
- research about related phase-outs in general – such as about the fossil fuel phase out
- research about relevant alternative technologies – such as in transport, HVAC, refrigeration, passive cooling, heat pumps and district heating
- research about related public awareness, media, policy-making and education
- research about related geopolitics, policies, and integrated strategies

Prior history of energy consumption sources over time

== Grids ==
=== Smart grids ===
==== 2022 ====
- A study provides results of simulations and analysis of "transactive energy mechanisms to engage the large-scale deployment of flexible distributed energy resources (DERs), such as air conditioners, water heaters, batteries, and electric vehicles, in the operation of the electric power system".

=== Super grids ===
==== 2022 ====
- Researchers describe a novel strategy to create a global sustainable interconnected energy system based on deep-ocean-compressed hydrogen transportation.

=== Microgrids and off-the-grid ===
- Researchers describe a way for "inherently robust, scalable method of integration using multiple energy storage systems and distributed energy resources, which does not require any means of dedicated communication improvised controls", which could make microgrids easy and low cost "where they are needed most" such as during a power outage or after a disaster.

== Solar power ==
Research on solar energy since 2020 has focused on improving the efficiency, durability, and recyclability of photovoltaic technologies. Alongside steady industrial cost declines, laboratories and firms have reported world-record efficiencies in perovskite and tandem solar cells, new approaches to recycling end-of-life modules, and integration of PV in agrivoltaics and building materials.

A 2023 review by the International Energy Agency described continued declines in solar PV costs and noted that research into perovskite–silicon tandem cells and recycling of photovoltaic modules represents "the most active innovation area" in renewable energy. Recent media analyses highlight how next-generation materials such as perovskites and quantum-dot photovoltaics are transitioning from laboratory prototypes to commercial lines.

This section summarizes major research advances in photovoltaic and solar-power technology from 2020 onward; for policy or deployment statistics, see Solar power and Timeline of solar cells.

Reported timeline of research solar cell energy conversion efficiencies since 1976 (National Renewable Energy Laboratory)

=== 2020 ===
- Solar cell efficiency of perovskite solar cells have increased from 3.8% in 2009 to 25.2% in 2020 in single-junction architectures, and, in silicon-based tandem cells, to 29.1%, exceeding the maximum efficiency achieved in single-junction silicon solar cells.
- 6 March – Scientists show that adding a layer of perovskite crystals on top of textured or planar silicon to create a tandem solar cell enhances its performance up to a power conversion efficiency of 26%. This could be a low cost way to increase efficiency of solar cells.
- 13 July – The first global assessment into promising approaches of solar photovoltaic modules recycling is published. Scientists recommend "research and development to reduce recycling costs and environmental impacts compared to disposal while maximizing material recovery" as well as facilitation and use of techno–economic analyses.
- 3 July – Scientists show that adding an organic-based ionic solid into perovskites can result in substantial improvement in solar cell performance and stability. The study also reveals a complex degradation route that is responsible for failures in aged perovskite solar cells. The understanding could help the future development of photovoltaic technologies with industrially relevant longevity.

=== 2021 ===
- 12 April – Scientists develop a prototype and design rules for both-sides-contacted silicon solar cells with conversion efficiencies of 26% and above, Earth's highest for this type of solar cell.
- 7 May – Researchers address a key problem of perovskite solar cells by increasing their stability and long-term reliability with a form of "molecular glue".
- 21 May – The first industrial commercial production line of perovskite solar panels, using an inkjet printing procedure, is launched in Poland.
- 13 December – Researchers report the development of a database and analysis tool about perovskite solar cells which systematically integrates over 15,000 publications, in particular device-data about over 42,400 of such photovoltaic devices.
- 16 December – ML System from Jasionka, Poland, opens first quantum glass production line. The factory started the production of windows integrating a transparent quantum-dots layer that can produce electricity while also capable of cooling buildings.

=== 2022 ===
- 30 May - A team at Fraunhofer ISE led by Frank Dimroth developed a 4-junction solar cell with an efficiency of 47.6% - a new world record for solar energy conversion.
- 13 July – Researchers report the development of semitransparent solar cells that are as large as windows, after team members achieved record efficiency with high transparency in 2020. On 4 July, researchers report the fabrication of solar cells with a record average visible transparency of 79%, being nearly invisible.
- 9 December – Researchers report the development of 3D-printed flexible paper-thin organic photovoltaics.
- 19 December – A new world record solar cell efficiency for a silicon-perovskite tandem solar cell is achieved, with a German team of scientists converting 32.5% of sunlight into electrical energy.

2023

In 2023, researchers at the Helmholtz-Zentrum Berlin (HZB) achieved a certified 32.5% power conversion efficiency for a tandem perovskite-silicon solar cell, certified by the European Solar Test Installation (ESTI). Subsequent lab iterations at Longi Solar and King Abdullah University of Science and Technology (KAUST) further pushed certified two-terminal tandem efficiencies above 33.7%, confirming perovskite tandems as viable commercial successors to standard crystalline silicon.Science Journal Publication: Interface engineering for high-efficiency perovskite/silicon tandem solar cells, Science (2023)

=== 2024 ===
- 12 March – Scientists demonstrate the first monolithically integrated tandem solar cell using selenium as the photoabsorbing layer in the top cell, and silicon as the photoabsorbing layer in the bottom cell.

=== 2025 ===
- 1 June - Quantum Dot Solar Cells: enhanced efficiency and lower production costs.

=== High-altitude and space-based solar power ===
Ongoing research and development projects include SSPS-OMEGA, SPS-ALPHA, and the Solaris program.

==== 2020 ====
- The US Naval Research Laboratory conducts its first test of solar power generation in a satellite, the PRAM experiment aboard the Boeing X-37.

==== 2023 ====
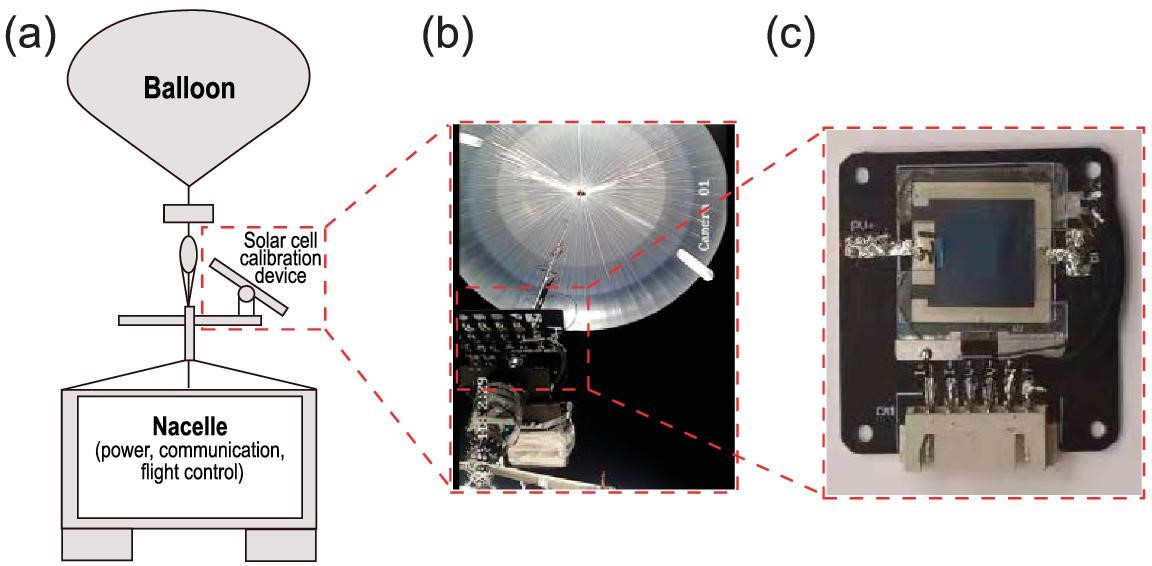

- Researchers demonstrate flexible organic solar cells on balloons in the 35 km stratosphere.
- Caltech reports the first successful beaming of solar energy from space down to a receiver on the ground, via the MAPLE instrument on its SSPD-1 spacecraft, launched into orbit in January.

=== Floating solar ===
==== 2020 ====
- A study concludes that deploying floating solar panels on existing hydro reservoirs could generate 16%–40% (4,251 to 10,616 TWh/year) of global energy needs when not considering project-siting constraints, local development regulations, "economic or market potential" and potential future technology improvements.

==== 2022 ====
- Researchers develop floating artificial leaves for light-driven hydrogen and syngas fuel production. The lightweight, flexible perovskite devices are scalable and can float on water similar to lotus leaves.

==== 2023 ====
- An analysis concludes there is large potential (≈9,400 TWh/yr) for floating solar photovoltaics on reservoirs, at the upper range of the prior 2020 study (see above).

=== Agrivoltaics ===
- 2021 – An improved agrivoltaic system with a grooved glass plate is demonstrated.
- 2021 – A report reviews several studies about the potential of agrivoltaics, which partly suggest "high potential of agrivoltaics as a viable and efficient technology" and outline concerns for refinements to the technology.
- 2022 – Researchers report the development of greenhouses (or solar modules) by a startup that generate electricity from a portion of the spectrum of sunlight, allowing spectra that interior plants use to pass through.
- 2023 – Demonstration of another agrivoltaic greenhouse which outperforms a conventional glass-roof greenhouse.

=== Solar-powered production ===
==== Water production ====
===== Early 2020s =====
- Hydrogels are used to develop system that capture moisture (e.g. at night in a desert) to cool solar panels or to produce fresh water – including for irrigating crops as demonstrated in solar panel integrated systems where these have been enclosed next to or beneath the panels within the system.

== Wind power ==
=== 2021 ===
- A study using simulations finds that large scale vertical-axis wind turbines could outcompete conventional HAWTs (horizontal axis) wind farm turbines.
- Scientists report that due to decreases in power generation efficiency of wind farms downwind of offshore wind farms, cross-national limits and potentials for optimization need to be considered in strategic decision-making.
- Researchers report, based on simulations, how large wind-farm performance can be significantly improved using windbreaks.
- The world's first fully autonomous commercial "airborne wind energy" system (an airborne wind turbine) is launched by a company.
- An U.S. congressionally directed report concludes that "the resource potential of wind energy available to AWE systems is likely similar to that available to traditional wind energy systems" but that "AWE would need significant further development before it could deploy at meaningful scales at the national level".

=== 2023 ===
- First kWh by a TLP floating airborne wind turbine system (X30) possibly as part of a "new wave of startups" in this area.
- Completion of the first functional 105 meters tall more-modular Modvion wooden wind turbine is reported.

=== 2024 ===
- Minesto's Dragon 12 underwater tidal kite turbines are demonstrated successfully, connected to the Faroe Island's power grid.

== Hydrogen energy ==
=== 2022 ===
- Researchers increase water electrolysis performance of renewable hydrogen via capillary-fed electrolysis cells.
- A novel energy-efficient strategy for hydrogen release from liquid hydrogen carriers with the potential to reduce costs of storage and transportation is reported.
- Researchers report the development of a potential efficient, secure and convenient method to separate, purify, store and transport large amounts of hydrogen for energy storage in renewables-based energy systems as powder using ball milling.
- A way method for hydrogen production from the air, useful for off-the-grid settings, is demonstrated.
- A novel type of effective hydrogen storage using readily available salts is reported.
- An electrolysis system for viable hydrogen production from seawater without requiring a pre-desalination process is reported, which could allow for more flexible and less costly hydrogen production.
- Chemical engineers report a method to substantially increase conversion efficiency and reduce material costs of green hydrogen production by using sound waves during electrolysis.

=== 2023 ===
- Separate teams of researchers report substantial improvements to green hydrogen production methods, enabling higher efficiencies and durable use of untreated seawater.
- A DVGW report suggests gas pipeline infrastructures (in Germany) are suitable to be repurposed to transport hydrogen, showing limited corrosion.
- A concentrated solar-to-hydrogen device approaching viability is demonstrated.
- Record solar-to-hydrogen efficiencies, using photoelectrochemical cells, are reported.

== Hydroelectricity and marine energy ==
=== 2021 ===
- Engineers report the development of a prototype wave energy converter that is twice as efficient as similar existing experimental technologies, which could be a major step towards practical viability of tapping into the sustainable energy source.
- A study investigates how tidal energy could be best integrated into the Orkney energy system. A few days earlier, a review assesses the potential of tidal energy in the UK's energy systems, finding that it could, according to their considerations that include an economic cost-benefit analysis, deliver 34 TWh/y or 11% of its energy demand.

== Energy storage ==
=== Electric batteries ===
==== 2022 ====
- In a paywalled article, scientists provide 3D imaging and model analysis to reveal main causes, mechanics, and potential mitigations of the prevalent lithium-ion battery degradation over charge cycles.

==== 2023 ====
- In two studies, researchers report that substitution of PET adhesive tapes could nearly prevent self-discharge in the widely used lithium-ion batteries, extending battery life. Analysts describe 2020s battery-technology progress as pivotal for renewable integration, citing new chemistries, improved safety, and reduced critical-material use.

=== Thermal energy storage ===
- 2022 – Researchers report the development of a system that combines the MOST solar thermal energy storage system that can store energy for 18 years with a chip-sized thermoelectric generator to generate electricity from it.

=== Novel and emerging types ===
- 2021 – A company generates its first power from a gravity battery at a site in Edinburgh. Other gravity batteries are also under construction by other companies.
- 2022 – A study describes using lifts and empty apartments in tall buildings to store energy, estimating global potential around 30 to 300 GWh.

== Nuclear fusion ==
The US has been counting on private industry to lead in fusion power, while more recently China's government has made fusion a national priority. In 2025, $2.1 billion was poured into a single Chinese state-owned fusion company, an amount two and a half times the U.S. Energy Department's annual fusion budget.

- 2020
  - Assembly of ITER, which has been under construction for years, commences.
  - The Chinese experimental nuclear fusion reactor HL-2M is turned on for the first time, achieving its first plasma discharge.
  - On November 1, the National Ignition Facility records the first burning plasma achieved in a laboratory.
- 2021
  - On August 8, the National Ignition Facility records the first experiment to surpass the Lawson criterion.
  - [Record] China's Experimental Advanced Superconducting Tokamak sustains a high-temperature plasma for 101 seconds (120 million °C).
  - [Record] The National Ignition Facility achieves Q = 0.70.
  - [Record] China's Experimental Advanced Superconducting Tokamak sustains a high-temperature plasma for 1,056 seconds (70 million °C).
- 2022
  - [Record] The Joint European Torus in Oxford, UK, produces a 59 MJ pulse (5 seconds).
  - [Record] On August 8, the National Ignition Facility records the first laboratory plasma ignition. The energy gain factor was Q = 0.72, the ratio of laser beam input to fusion output.
  - [Record] On December 5, the National Ignition Facility records the first experiment to surpass scientific breakeven, achieving an energy gain factor of Q = 1.54, producing more fusion energy than the laser beam delivered to the target. Laser efficiency is on the order of 1%.
- 2023
  - [Record] On February 15, 2023, Wendelstein 7-X reached a new milestone: Power plasma with gigajoule energy turnover generated for eight minutes.
  - On February 21, 2023, the first proton-boron fusion via magnetic confinement is reported at Japan's Large Helical Device.
  - JT-60SA achieves first plasma in October, making it the largest operational superconducting tokamak in the world.
  - On 18 December, Joint European Torus pulses its final plasma before decommissioning, after over 40 years of operation.
- 2024
  - In June, the HH70 tokamak, built by the Chinese company Energy Singularity, achieves first plasma. It is the first fusion device to exclusively use high-temperature superconducting magnets.
  - On February 26, the Korean Superconducting Tokamak Advanced Research records a high-temperature plasma for 48 seconds (100 million °C).
- 2025
  - On February 12, the CEA's WEST machine was able to maintain a plasma for more than 22 minutes. This was a 25% improvement on the previous record time achieved with EAST, in China, a few weeks previously.

== Geothermal energy ==
=== 2022 ===
- A study describes a way by which geothermal power plants could store their energy within their reservoirs for dispatch to (better) help manage intermittency of solar and wind.

== Waste heat recovery ==
=== 2020 ===
- Reviews about WHR in the aluminium industry and cement industry are published.

=== 2023 ===
- A report by the company Danfoss estimates EU's excess heat recovery potential, suggesting there is "huge, unharnessed potential" and that action could involve initial mapping of existing waste heat sources.

== Bioenergy, chemical engineering and biotechnology ==
=== 2020 ===
- Scientists report the development of micro-droplets for algal cells or synergistic algal-bacterial multicellular spheroid microbial reactors capable of producing oxygen as well as hydrogen via photosynthesis in daylight under air.

=== 2022 ===
- Researchers report the development of 3D-printed nano-"skyscraper" electrodes that house cyanobacteria for extracting substantially more sustainable bioenergy from their photosynthesis than before.
- News outlets report about the development of algae biopanels by a company for sustainable energy generation with unclear viability after other researchers built the self-powered BIQ house prototype in 2013.

==== 2023 ====
- A bacterial hydrogenase enzyme, Huc, for biohydrogen energy from the air is reported.

== General ==
In 2025, growth in solar, wind and other low-carbon electric power exceeded the overall growth in demand for electricity, reducing reliance on fossil fuels and helping to curb greenhouse gas emissions.

Research about sustainable energy in general or across different types.

=== Other energy-need reductions ===
Research and development of (technical) means to substantially or systematically reduce need for energy beyond smart grids, education / educational technology (such as about differential environmental impacts of diets), transportation infrastructure (bicycles and rail transport) and conventional improvements of energy efficiency on the level of the energy system.

==== 2020 ====
- A study shows a set of different scenarios of minimal energy requirements for providing decent living standards globally, finding that – according to their models, assessments and data – by 2050 global energy use could be reduced to 1960 levels despite 'sufficiency' still being materially relatively generous.

==== 2022 ====
- A trial of estimated financial energy cost of refrigerators alongside EU energy-efficiency class (EEEC) labels online finds that the approach of labels involves a trade-off between financial considerations and higher cost requirements in effort or time for the product-selection from the many available options which are often unlabelled and don't have any EEEC-requirement for being bought, used or sold within the EU.

=== Materials and recycling ===
==== 2020 ====
- Researchers report that mining for renewable energy production will increase threats to biodiversity and publish a map of areas that contain needed materials as well as estimations of their overlaps with "Key Biodiversity Areas", "Remaining Wilderness" and "Protected Areas". The authors assess that careful strategic planning is needed.

==== 2021 ====
- Neodymium, an essential rare-earth element (REE), plays a key role in making permanent magnets for wind turbines. Demand for REEs is expected to double by 2035 due to renewable energy growth, posing environmental risks, including radioactive waste from their extraction.

==== 2023 ====
- A study finds that the world has enough rare earths and other raw materials to switch from fossil fuels to renewable energy.
- A new viable lithium-ion battery recycling method is reported.

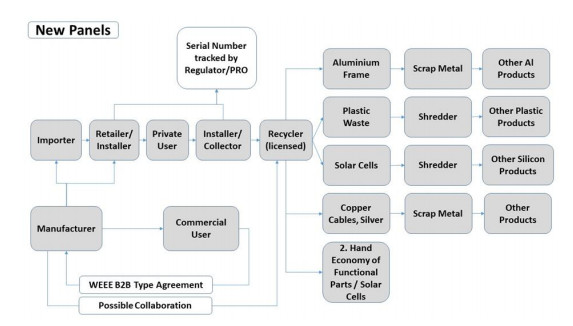
Flow chart of proposed or possible product stewardship scheme for new solar PV panels

- A study suggests incentives and regulations are needed for producers to design solar panels that can be more easily recycled.

==== Seabed mining ====
===== 2020 =====
- Researchers assess to what extent international law and existing policy support the practice of a proactive knowledge management system that enables systematic addressing of uncertainties about the environmental effects of seabed mining via regulations that, for example, enable the International Seabed Authority to actively engage in generating and synthesizing information.

===== 2021 =====
- A moratorium on deep-sea mining until rigorous and transparent impact assessments are carried out is adopted at the 2021 world congress of the International Union for the Conservation of Nature (IUCN). The vote, however, has no legal implications given that deep-sea mining regulations continue to be governed by the International Seabed Authority as established by UNCLOS. Researchers have outlined why there is a need to avoid mining the deep sea.
- Nauru requested the ISA to finalize rules so that The Metals Company be approved to begin work in 2023.
- China's COMRA tested its polymetallic nodules collection system at 4,200 feet of depth in the East and South China Seas. The Dayang Yihao was exploring the Clarion–Clipperton zone (CCZ) for China Minmetals when it crossed into the U.S. exclusive economic zone near Hawaii, where for five days it looped south of Honolulu without having requested entry into US waters.
- Belgian company Global Sea Mineral Resources (GSR) and the German Federal Institute for Geosciences and Natural Resources (BGR) conduct a test in the CCZ with a prototype mining vehicle named Patania II. This test was the first of its kind since the late 1970s.

===== 2022 =====
- Impossible Metals announces its first underwater robotic vehicle, 'Eureka 1', has completed its first trial of selectively harvesting polymetallic nodule rocks from the seabed to help address the rising global need for metals for renewable energy system components, mainly batteries.

===== 2023 =====
- Supporters of mining were led by Norway, Mexico, and the United Kingdom, and supported by The Metals Company.
- Chinese prospecting ship Dayang Hao prospected in China-licensed areas in the Clarion Clipperton Zone.

===== 2024 =====
- Norway approved commercial deep-sea mining. 80% of Parliament voted to approve.
- On February 7, 2024, the European Parliament voted in favor of a Motion for Resolution, expressing environmental concerns regarding Norway's decision to open vast areas in Arctic waters for deep-sea mining activities and reaffirming its support for a moratorium.
- In July 2024, at the 29th General Assembly of the International Seabed Authority in Kingston, Jamaica, 32 countries united against the imminent start of mining for metallic nodules on the seafloor. In his address titled "Upholding the Common Heritage of Humankind", President Surangel S. Whipps Jr. of Palau spoke about exploitation and modern-day colonialism.
- In November 2024, the People's Republic of China unveiled its first deep-sea drilling vehicle.
- In December 2024 Norway suspended deep sea mining, after the Socialist Left (SV) party said that otherwise, it would not support the budget.

===== 2025 =====
- On January 1st, 2025, Brazilian oceanographer Leticia Carvalho assumed the office of Secretary-General of the International Seabed Authority, after being elected in August 2024 to succeed Michael Lodge in the position.
- In April 2025, U.S. President Trump signed an Executive Order instructing the National Oceanic and Atmospheric Administration to expedite permits for companies to mine in both international and U.S. territorial waters, which would undermine the authority of the International Seabed Authority.
- Beginning in March and ending in July of 2025, the International Seabed Authority held their 30th session in Kingston, Jamaica, and again failed to agree on exploitative regulations for commercial deep sea mining in the Area.

===== 2026 =====
- The International Seabed Authority will begin their 31st session on February 23rd, 2026, as part of "Part 1" of the gathering, where the Legal and Technical Commission will meet. On March 6th, the session will end, before transitioning to a meeting of the Council from the 9th to 20th of the month. On June 29th, "Part 2" will commence, and will last until July 31st.

=== Maintenance ===
Maintenance of sustainable energy systems could be automated, standardized and simplified and the required resources and efforts for such get reduced via research relevant for their design and processes like waste management.

==== 2022 ====
- Researchers demonstrate electrostatic dust removal from solar panels.

=== Economics ===
==== 2021 ====
- A review finds that the pace of cost-decline of renewables has been underestimated and that an "open cost-database would greatly benefit the energy scenario community". A 2022 study comes to similar conclusions.

==== 2022 ====
- A study investigates funding allocations for public investment in energy research, development and demonstration. It provides insights about potential past impacts of drivers, that may be relevant to adjusting (or facilitating) "investment in clean energy" "to come close to achieving meaningful global decarbonization", suggesting advancement of impactful "coopetition".

=== Feasibility studies and energy system models ===
==== 2020 ====
- A study suggests that all sector defossilisation can be achieved worldwide even for nations with severe conditions. The study suggests that integration impacts depend on "demand profiles, flexibility and storage cost".

==== 2021 ====
- Researchers develop an energy system model for 100% renewable energy, examining feasibility and grid stability in the U.S.

==== 2022 ====
- A revised or updated version of a major worldwide 100% renewable energy proposed plan and model is published.
- Researchers review the scientific literature on 100% renewable energy, addressing various issues, outlining open research questions, and concluding there to be growing consensus, research and empirical evidence concerning its feasibility worldwide.

==== 2023 ====
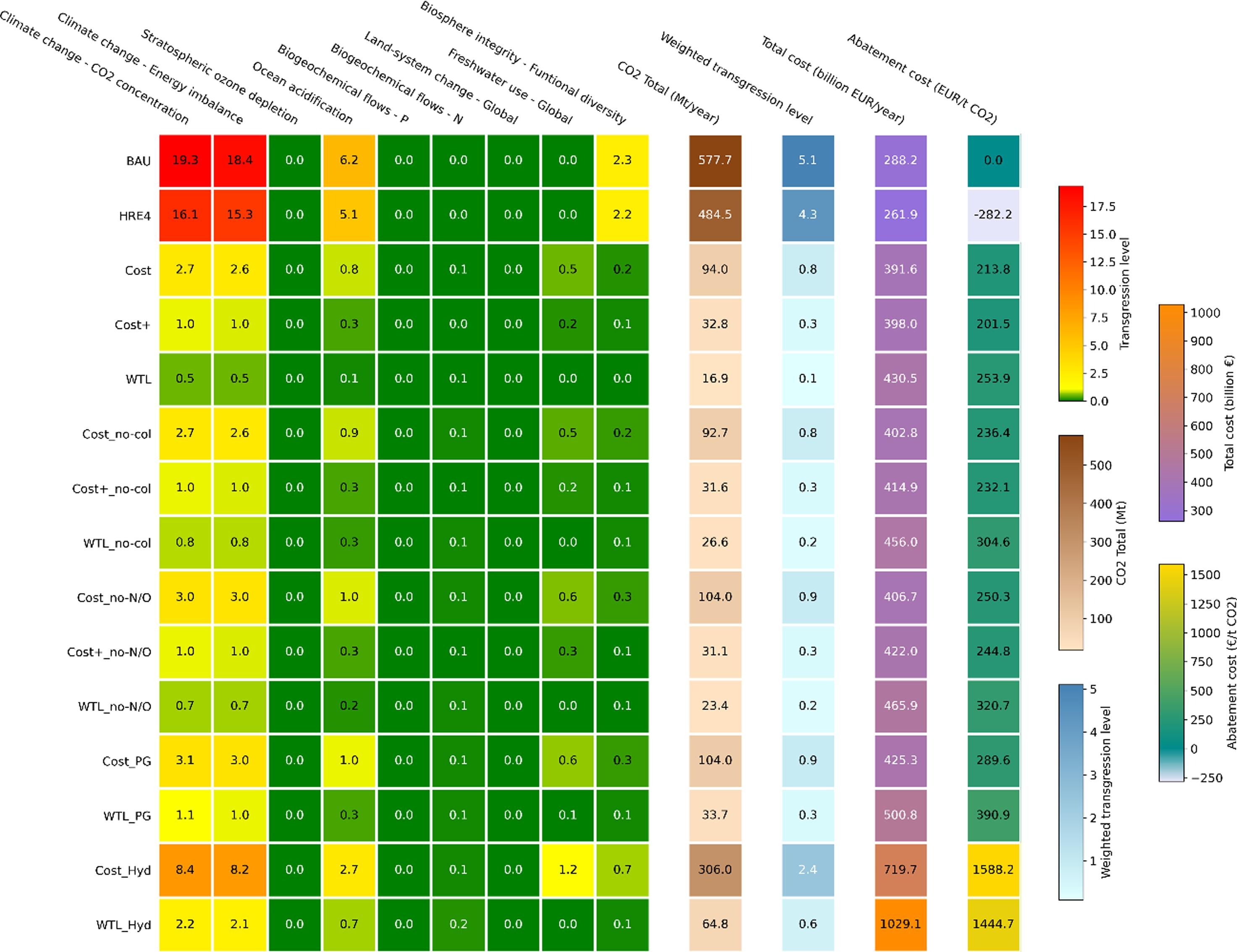
Assessment of pathways for building heating in the EU (more)

- A study indicates that in building heating in the EU, the feasibility of staying within planetary boundaries is possible only through electrification, with green hydrogen heating being 2–3 times more expensive than heat pump costs. A separate study indicates that replacing gas boilers with heat pumps is the fastest way to cut German gas consumption, despite "gas-industry lobbyists and [...] politicians" at the time making "the case for hydrogen" amid some heating transition policy changes, for which the former study revealed a need to "mitigate increased costs for [many of the] consumers".

== See also ==
- Climate change adaptation
- Energy development
- Energy policy
  - Funding of science
  - Energy transition
  - Green recovery
  - Public research and development
  - Policy studies
- Energy system
- Renewable energy#Emerging technologies
- List of emerging technologies#Energy
- Technology transfer
- Outline of energy

Not yet included

- Standardization#Environmental protection such as for certifications and policies
- Open energy system models
- Open energy system databases
- Power-to-X
- Nanogeneration such as synthetic molecular motors for microbots and nanobots

Timelines of related areas

- Timeline of materials technology#20th century
- Timeline of computing 2020–present
- Timeline of transportation technology#21st century
