= Rare-earth industry in China =

The People's Republic of China (PRC) is a leading producer and the dominant processor of rare-earth elements (REEs), which are used in technologies ranging from to permanent magnets through to electric vehicles (EVs) and wind turbines to consumer electronics. China is particularly dominant in the midstream separation and refining stages of the rare-earth supply chain and in downstream permanent-magnet manufacturing; the International Energy Agency estimated that China accounted for about 91% of global separation and refining production and 94% of sintered permanent magnet production in 2024.

China has economically extractable deposits of both light and heavy REE ores and has developed industrial-scale solvent extraction for refining them. Over the past decades, it has supplied the majority of global rare-earth demand and holds the world's largest known reserves; the United States Geological Survey reported China's reserves at 44 million tonnes (rare-earth-oxide equivalent) in its February 2026 Mineral Commodity Summaries.

The country also holds a dominant share of global rare-earth-related patents across the value chain; a 2026 patent landscape report based on the EPO's DOCDB simple patent family methodology identified 22,040 global patent families filed between 2014 and 2024 in rare-earth-related technologies, with China accounting for 81% of filings.

Since 2016, China has implemented export controls on certain rare-earth elements and rare-earth processing technology; in 2025, it introduced two waves of export controls covering rare-earth elements and related products and technologies, with the second wave later suspended for one year. In 2026 automatized real-time controls and penalties were introduced in the rare-earth industry.

== History ==
Global production 1950–2000

In 1927, rare earths were discovered and small scale production of concentrates started as early as 1958, but the Chinese government did not have interest in the large scale potential of these elements until the 1980s and 90s.

In China, Xu Guangxian is regarded as the founding father of China's rare earth industry. A pioneer for rare earth research, Xu Guangxian came back to Peking University in China after graduating from Columbia University. In 1980, he joined as a member of the Chinese Academy of Sciences. A few years later, Xu created the State Key Laboratory of Rare Earth Materials Chemistry and Applications for research on these elements. Xu would go on to have powerful positions in the scientific community such as a Director in the National Natural Science Foundation of China, Chairman of the Chinese Chemical Society, and Vice Chairman in the Chinese Society of Rare Earths. Later in the 2000s, Xu was also influential in telling the government to adopt export quotas because he saw the potential rare earths had in the technology sector and wanted to keep these precious resources within China.

The Chinese Society of Rare Earths was created in 1980, and 1985 saw the establishment of the China Rare Earth Information Center (CREIC). A major policy tool behind the major growth of the rare earths industry in the 1980s was China's export rebate system, which provided a tax credit of up to 17% for rare earth products. Through this policy tool, the government sought to attract new domestic producers and stimulate production (and also to increase China's foreign exchange reserves). Government support increased in 1986 with the program known as Program 863 which calls for the advancing of the country through technological breakthrough and increase research to propel the country forward economically and strategically. Another important program Program 973 was created as a basic research program to utilise science to advance the rare-earth industry. During this time and in the following decades, the government heavily invested in building the infrastructure and developing the intellectual capital necessary to establish a competitive rare-earth industry.

Another form of governmental support was its encouragement to Chinese rare earth companies to partner with rare earth industries from other countries. In 1979, Japan's Inoue Japax Research worked with China to do research regarding ore analysis, ore dressing, and product application. In 1989, Ke Ning Da Industry of Ningbo, China partnered with US firm Tredas International to make 40 tons of magnets. The Chinese rare earth network later expanded to include relationships with Canada and additional countries from the West. With its policy support, China became the world's largest rare earths supplier in a relatively short period of time.

Between 1985 and 1995 China increased its share in the production of REEs from 21% to 60%. The causes of this rise are attributed to tax reductions, favourable credits which were further aided by low labour costs and minimal environmental regulation.

In the 2000s, China began to restrict the industry out of a desire to control foreign investment in strategic industries, and exports of rare earths decreased. As rare earth prices went up because of the restriction of export, many illegal mines were developed by organized criminals to benefit from the trade. The smuggling by organized criminal groups is harmful to China's rare earth industry as it depletes resources rapidly, deflates prices and causes supply problems for local producers. It is estimated a third of exports or 20,000 tonnes in 2008 were illegally exported from China.

In 2011 Chinese authorities established an industry group called the China Rare Earth Industry Association to coordinate pricing collectively with foreign buyers. Wang Caifeng was the inaugural head of the association.

In 2010 it was estimated that China held 36 per cent of all rare-earth deposits in the world. Due to Chinese export restrictions and heavy dependence of foreign countries on Chinese sources, efforts are ongoing to restart rare-earth industries in other countries and to pressure countries with intensive industry, like Japan, to source rare-earths elsewhere. Non-Chinese companies which will benefit from increased demand are Lynas Corporation, Iluka Resources, Arafura Rare Earths, and other Australian companies, including some being assisted by government support under its "Critical Minerals Strategy 2023–2030". The Mountain Pass mine in California, which has been closed since 2002 due to heavy competition from China, was planned to be restarted by Molycorp in 2011.

In 2011, the State Council issued its Opinions on Promoting the Sustainable and Healthy Development of the Rare Earth Industry, which sought greater government supervision over the industry and increased government control over exports.

Between 2011 and 2015, China closed and merged rare earth mining and refining companies into the "Big Six."

In 2016, China's central government released the second "Development Plan for the Rare Earths Industry" (2016–2020) which set industry goals designed to contribute to the fulfillment of the Thirteenth Five-Year Plan. The plan emphasized the need for innovation, market-oriented growth, industry consolidation, managing resources, further developing environmental standards, increasing rare earth applications in strategic economic sectors, and developing new supply chains for domestic and foreign markets. The "National Plan for Mineral Resources" (2016–2020) defined for the first time a category of 24 strategic minerals that the central government views as essential for China's national and economic security and for the growth of emerging industries; the strategic minerals list included the major minerals necessary for green technology.

China has shut down some of its own ionic clay mines due to their environmental impact, and started mining heavy rare-earths in Myanmar. In 2019, China supplied between 85% and 95% of the global demand for the 17 rare-earth powders, much of it sourced from Myanmar. After the 2021 military coup in that country, future supplies of critical ores were possibly constrained. It was speculated that China could again reduce rare-earth exports to counteract economic sanctions imposed by the US and EU countries.

For the Fourteenth five-year plan period, the central government addressed rare-earths industry plans as part of the broader raw materials industry, which the government describes as "the bedrock for the real economy". The "Development Plan for the Raw Materials Industry" was released in 2021 and highlighted the securing of the supply chain, expanding foreign markets, and supporting green and digital transitions. The plan also focuses on promoting consolidation in the industry to have fewer but more competitive rare earths firms.

Between 2021 and 2024, China accounted for 71% of U.S. imports of rare-earth compounds and metals (by source share). In 2023, China introduced export restrictions on germanium and gallium, and banned the export of certain rare-earth processing technology. In 2025, during the China–United States trade war, China restricted exports of heavy rare earths to the US.

The US Geological Survey's February 2026 report on rare-earth elements placed China first of all countries in the world in both reserves and production of rare-earths, with 44 million metric tons in reserves (REE), and with 2025 production of 270,000 metric tons (rare-earth-oxide equivalent).

As of 2025, China is the world's largest processor of rare-earth elements for a variety of industries, including electric vehicles (EVs), wind turbines, magnets, consumer electronics, and other clean energy technologies. Rare earth elements are important to national governments because they are used in the defense industry.

In October 2025, China expanded its export controls on rare earths, with a focus on materials used in the defense and chip industries; the second wave of controls was later suspended for one year, while China began issuing general export licences to selected exporters to facilitate civilian trade under the remaining controls.

== Major firms and state research organizations ==
The Chinese rare earth industry is dominated by local state owned enterprises, private firms and centrally owned state firms.

In northern China, rare earth industry is dominated by the Inner Mongolia Baotou Steel Rare-Earth Hi-Tech Company. In southern China, China Minmetals is the dominant player in the region. Other major players include the Aluminum Corporation of China Limited and China Non-Ferrous Metal Mining.

In December 2021 China announced the formation of a new conglomerate, China Rare-Earths Group, created by a merger of companies and subsidiaries including China Minmetals Rare Earth, Aluminum Corporation of China Limited Rare Earth, Ganzhou Rare Earth Group, and China Southern Rare Earth Group, among others. The new entity, a state-owned enterprise, controlled approximately 70% of China's rare earth production.

China has two state research facilities which provide specialized research into rare earth elements. They are the Rare Earth Materials Chemistry and Applications state key laboratory, which is associated with Peking University, and the Rare Earth Resource Utilization state key laboratory located in Changchun, Jilin province.

The Chinese rare earth industry also has two journals which publish research in rare-earth minerals. They are the Journal of Rare Earth and China Rare Earth Information (CREI) Journal. These journals are published by the Chinese Society of Rare Earths established in 1980 by Chinese rare earth researchers.

Chinese institutions have filed a large number of rare earth-related patents; a 2026 patent landscape report based on EPO PATSTAT Global data identified 22,040 global DOCDB simple patent families filed between 2014 and 2024 in rare-earth-related technologies, with China accounting for 81% of filings.

== Processing sector ==
China is the dominant processor of rare earth elements; the International Energy Agency estimated that China accounted for about 91% of global separation and refining production in 2024 and 94% of sintered permanent magnet production. The core of this dominance lies not in mining but in complex midstream processing that requires advanced chemical engineering. China is particularly dominant in processing heavy rare earth elements (HREE). A Reuters analysis indicates that China will continue to lead global processing of HREEs in 2030, since it controls approximately 99% of the world's capacity.

The Diplomat identified three structural factors behind China's processing dominance. The first is the "resource lock" where the real bottleneck is heavy rare earth elements (HREE). The west including Australia, United States and Canada have an abundance of light rare earths, but lack economically viable HREEs. However China's clay deposits are the "world's most economical HREE source" as it allows simple low cost processes to extract, which is both significantly easier and cheaper than dealing with the hard rock HREE deposits found in places like Strange Lake in Canada, and Norra Kärr in Sweden.

The second factor is "technology lock". In the past decades, China had perfected and scaled the solvent extraction process for refining rare earth elements at industrial levels. Because this technical expertise is difficult for competitors to replicate, China's process is unmatched globally, and they have reinforced their position with extensive patenting of rare-earth technologies and restricting exports of rare earth processing technologies to prevent competitors to attain their expertise.

A third factor is the "Ecosystem Lock". China created an entire industrial ecosystem from mining to magnet production. The country is also the world's largest consumer of rare earths, and its domestic electric vehicle and wind turbine industries absorb enough rare-earth material to sustain processing plants at scales Western competitors cannot yet match commercially.

As a result of China's dominance, a number of prominent REE producing countries, including Myanmar and Australia, offshore their REE processing to China. China hosts a large number of mineral separation plants, such as the Australian-based Astron Corporation's plant at Yingkou.

== Broader implications ==
=== Politics ===
From 2000 to 2009, China's production of rare earth elements increased 77 percent to 129,000 tons, while production from other reserves dropped to around 3000 tons. Large US mining companies such as Molycorp closed due to the mix of China's abundance of rare earths and their capacities for production, as well as the cost of labor and stringent environmental regulations during the Nixon era. With the decreased pool of competitors, China's hold on these elements gave them a lot of power in the distribution of these commodities. The government declared these elements to be a protected and strategic good in 1990. This decision had a significant impact on foreign industries who partnered with China. Foreign investors could no longer work with rare earths except when partnered with Chinese firms. The State Development and Planning Commission gained power, as all projects needed their approval. Production quotas were instigated for the miners and oftentimes quotas would be surpassed because of illegal mining by people who did not have licenses.

The Chinese government was also able to use these rare earths as a means of exerting power over other countries. As production levels reached all time highs and China declared rare earths to be protected, the government imposed tight regulations on exports. Currently, the Ministry of Commerce is responsible for setting quotas for domestic producers and for foreign joint venture producers. In 2015, a select 20 domestic producers could export elements and the export quota was 35,000 tons total for both domestic and joint venture producers. These decreasing figures alarmed other countries because they depend on China for their supply of rare earths. If China were to cut off the exports, the results for the technology sector would be disastrous. This occurred temporarily in 2010 when the Chinese had tensions with Japan due to a maritime dispute. They stopped all their exports to Japan and also reduced their exports from 40 to 30 percent.

Because China was the world's biggest supplier of rare earths at the time it instituted export restrictions in the 2000s, its policies resulted in major disruption to global supply and significant price increases. In response, the United States, European Union, and Japan brought a case against China in the World Trade Organization in 2012. They contended that China's export controls effectively subsidized downstream industries relying on rare earths (such as steel, photovoltaics, and semi-conductors) by keeping inputs low. The WTO ruled against China, determining that its export controls were not justifiable according to the exceptions that China had contended. China complied with the ruling, which also prompted increased policy coordination by central ministries and provided the impetus for further domestic reform.

China's rare-earth industry is relevant to the United States and other countries because rare-earth elements are required inputs for defense systems, electric vehicles, and clean energy equipment. Tesla's shift to a magnetic motor for its Model 3 Long Range car increased sales for neodymium. Because of the export quota, prices for rare-earths are rising. In 2018 the cost for 1 kilogram of neodymium was US$70. U.S. defense procurement is a structurally limited lever for countering Chinese pricing power: Pentagon consumption of rare earths and similar critical minerals represents less than one-tenth of one percent of global demand. A 2025 Gordian Knot Center report on critical minerals noted the disparity: "We make 12 fighter jets monthly while Tesla produces [nearly 5,000] electric vehicles daily." Because commercial demand—not military demand—sets world market prices, supply-chain resilience for defense applications depends on broader industrial conditions that government procurement cannot control unilaterally.

Political relations play a large factor in the distribution of these commodities. In 2018, US President Donald Trump proposed tariffs on technology products imported from China. China responded with tariffs on US goods. In 2024, China responded to United States restrictions on exporting technology to China by banning the export of gallium, germanium, and antimony to the United States. The gallium ban followed a pattern that had played out a decade earlier: between 2014 and 2016, subsidized Chinese gallium exports drove global prices down approximately 75 percent, forcing Ingal Stade GmbH—at the time Europe's only primary gallium producer—to close its operations in Germany in 2016. After China announced licensing controls in July 2023 and banned exports to the United States in December 2024, gallium prices rose from approximately $110–130 per kilogram to $687 per kilogram by May 2025. Responding to the 2025 tariffs imposed by USA President Donald Trump, China implemented export controls on rare-earths.

The depth of Western supply-chain dependence on China has, in some cases, been underestimated by the companies most exposed to it. A 2025 Gordian Knot Center report documented a case in which a major U.S. defense contractor traced its titanium supply chain through thirteen tiers of suppliers and discovered dependence on Chinese mines, roads, and logistics networks. When the contractor disclosed these findings to the Department of Defense, officials penalized the firm for delays caused by the audit itself, an outcome that researchers identified as a structural disincentive for similar investigations at other firms.

In October 2025, China tightened export controls on rare-earth elements and related technologies, citing "national security concerns" ahead of a planned meeting between U.S. President Donald Trump and CCP General Secretary Xi Jinping at the 2025 APEC meeting in South Korea. The restrictions would require foreign companies to obtain approvals for items with potential dual-use applications. Currently, the global resources of heavy rare earths are largely sourced from ionic clay deposits in China. A 2025 analysis by Benchmark Mineral Intelligence indicates the West will be dependent on China for 91% of their heavy rare earth needs in 2030, which is a modest reduction from 99% in 2024.

==== Proposals for policy ====
A strand of policy literature argues that the principal vulnerability lies in midstream capacity — and, in particular, separation, refining, and manufacturing of magnet — and proposes shifting investment emphasis from mine development to processing and allied industrial ecosystems.

For instance, in a 2025 report for the Center for Strategic and International Studies, the critical-mineral analysts Gracelin Baskaran and Meredith Schwartz proposed identifying candidate rare-earth processing hubs outside China using a multi-criteria assessment and concentrating coordinated finance and industrial planning around the most viable locations.

Other, related proposals emphasise public financing and risk-sharing for capital-intensive processing projects. Namely, the Roosevelt Project at the Massachusetts Institute of Technology's Center for Energy and Environmental Policy Research set out an industrial-policy package in 2025 oriented toward supply-chain resilience in critical minerals, including public-finance instruments and governance reforms intended to accelerate domestic and allied capacity while addressing permitting and community impacts. Adrien Concordel, in a 2024 master's thesis for the selfsame Institute's Technology and Policy Program, proposed a policy framework for securing critical-material supply for the United States energy transition that combines capacity expansion with demand-side mechanisms and cross-agency coordination.

A market-design approach has also been proposed: In 2026, Peter H. Vartanian, in a white paper for the Hoover Institution at Stanford University, averred that supply-chain resilience could be pursued through procurement and financing rules that (1) would render verified non-Chinese processing and traceable provenance salient to contracting decisions, (2) expand midstream investment support through combinations of public incentives and long-term "off-take" commitments, and (3) standardise evidentiary requirements for provenance and beneficial ownership across relevant federal programmes, alongside (4) a designated lead coordinator for stage-specific processing lists and allied implementation.

=== Environment ===
Until the 1990s, the US had previously dominated the global REE industry but its domestic production declined after they started to make stricter environmental regulations that began in the 1980s. China comparatively did not tighten environmental regulations, but instead made a decision to heavily invest in the sector and increase production. Along with lax environmental regulations and strategic state-led planning, they overtook the United States in REE production in the 1990s and became dominant in the REE global industry by the early 2000s. This, however, all came at a high environmental cost to the villages surrounding the REE mining and processing operations. A majority of China's rare earth mining is concentrated in the sparsely populated Inner Mongolia region, namely the Bayan Obo mine near Baotou City, which alone holds a deposit that amounts to approximately over 80% of China's total rare earth reserves. Other provinces producing rare earths includes Shandong, Sichuan, Jiangxi, Guangdong, Fujian, Hunan, and Guangxi.

The sewage produced from the factories was dumped into nearby ponds and rivers. According to accounts from a resident of Bayan Obo, a major production center, "Before the factories were built, there were just fields here as far as the eye can see. In the place of this radioactive sludge, there were watermelons, aubergines and tomatoes". During the 1980s, "Plants grew badly. They would flower all right, but sometimes there was no fruit or they were small or smelt awful". In the villages near Bayan Obo, many farmers left because crops and livestock could not survive and the remaining farmers were affected with health problems. The reason why mining rare earths is so detrimental is because of the low concentrations of the elements in the raw ores. To extract these small amounts of ore, factories must use various separation and refinement techniques such as acid baths and leaching, which involve chemicals which damage the environment. The major pollutants were emissions of HF, H_{2}SO_{4}, SO_{2}, and NH_{3}.

Starting in around 2009, China introduced stricter environmental regulations to reduce environmental harm from rare earth mining and released Development Plan for the Rare Earths Industry (2009–2015). It increased controls on exports, mining and production and imposed specific environmental obligations. Other policy efforts when the plan was released included policies intended to support more sustainable value-added downstream manufacturing. In 2011, China enacted the country's first industrial standards for air and water pollution, specifically targeting the rare-earth sector. These standards were designed to prevent certain polluting mining and processing techniques from continuing. In 2012, the government introduced entry conditions that explicitly bans specific mining and extraction methods such as heaps leaching and pool leaching for Heavy Rare Earths (HRE), that are both considered environmentally destructive. As a result, companies could only lawfully operate if they used more modern and cleaner technologies.

Around 2010, China started regular inspections and crackdowns on companies who fail to meet the environment regulations. Despite quotas had actually increased, the combination of stricter environmental controls and enforcement resulted in a sharp decline in the national production of terbium, which is a critical heavy rare-earth. By 2018, just 25% of the production quota had been met, largely because the majority of HRE productions companies failed to comply with standards and were forced to cease operations until they met them.

In 2025, China implemented new industrial scale electrokinetic mining techniques developed in China's Guangzhou Institute of Geochemistry, that enabled large reductions in the use of bleaching agents and mining time, with environmental monitoring confirming 95% reduced emissions of NH_{3}, while being 95% efficient in extracting the rare earth elements from a given mining site compared to the 40 to 60% efficiency of previous conventional mining techniques. Conventional cleanups to repair the environmental damages from rare earth mining have been problematic as it both consumes a lot of energy and disturbs soil structures. Chinese scientists have been researching the use of bacteria for remediation, including processes such as microbial iron mining, which aim to reduce the cost and environmental impact of clean-up efforts; however research is currently only in the early development stages.

== See also ==
- Advanced materials industry in China
- Mining industry of China
- Program 863
- Rare earths trade dispute
- Science and technology in China
- Rare-earth industry in Australia
- Rare-earth resources in Chile
