= Michels Warren =

Public relations firm in South Australia

- Industry: Public relations
- Founded: 1978
- Headquarters: North Adelaide, Australia
- Owner: Phil Martin (managing director)
- Website: michelswarren.com.au

Michels Warren is a South Australian public relations firm headquartered on Melbourne Street, North Adelaide and established in 1978. The company claims to be Adelaide's oldest Australian-owned PR consultancy, specialises in "building and protecting brands" and serves clients from public, private and not-for-profit sectors. In 2003 Phil Martin acquired the firm from former owners Daryl Warren and Janet Grieve, merging with Maverick Media & PR. In 2013 the agency employed 14 staff. The firm works closely with Keito Events, which is managed by former Michels Warren employee, Kate Abrahams.

== Services ==
Its role in promoting a case for the establishment of a nuclear waste repository in South Australia between 1999 and 2004 was a subject of controversy. During contracted work, Michels Warren staff liaised with Richard Yeeles of Western Mining Corporation regarding "updated intelligence." The firm has provided services to several resources sector clients, including Musgrave Minerals, oil and gas company Santos, oilfield services company Ensign Energy and uranium mining companies, Heathgate Resources and Arafura Resources. Michels Warren organised the opening ceremony at the Beverley uranium mine in 2000.

In 2015 Michels Warren was engaged by the Government of South Australia to provide services related to the contraction of TAFE services in South Australia and was also engaged by Rossi Boots as its public relations agency. Other South Australian clients include the Adelaide Oval, the South Australian National Football League, and the Australian Submarine Corporation (ASC). The company also developed the communications strategy for the Starfish Hill wind farm, the first commercial wind-powered electricity generator to be developed in the state.

=== 1999–2004 Nuclear waste repository proposal ===
Michels Warren was engaged by the federal government between 1999 and 2004 to provide services related supporting an affirmative case for the establishment of a nuclear waste repository in outback South Australia. Kelvin Thomson, Federal shadow environment minister for the Labor party lodged Freedom of Information requests to obtain details of Michels Warren's contract work and Senator Bob Brown asked questions in Parliament on the matter, resulting in further disclosure of contract costs and objectives. Further attention was drawn to their work by the South Australian Environment Minister, John Hill. Friends of the Earth allege that Michels Warren was engaged in the monitoring of protestors and production and dissemination of propaganda.

=== 2015–2016 Nuclear Fuel Cycle Royal Commission ===
Michels Warren was engaged by the Nuclear Fuel Cycle Royal Commission to provide a range of public relations and communications services during its public inquiry. Additionally, several Michels Warren's clients have interests in nuclear industrial development including construction companies Mott MacDonald, Lendlease and Baulderstone and Rheinmetall Defence, which provides nuclear power plant simulation services.

== Michels Warren Munday ==
The firm Michels Warren Munday was established by Jane Munday in 2004, and is focused on servicing clients in northern Australia from offices in Darwin and Alice Springs. The firm's staff have worked within government, private industry and the media. Its client base is diverse, representing "government, Aboriginal communities, resources, infrastructure, major projects, hospitality, tourism, agriculture, cattle, transport and not-for-profit" sectors. Founding director Jane Munday has professional expertise in crisis communication, following fifteen years as Police Media Director in Victoria and the Northern Territory. She was formerly national media training coordinator under Australia's counter-terrorism arrangements. Michels Warren Munday has fulfilled a number of contracts for the Commonwealth Government, including work related to the roll-out of low aromatic fuel. Among Michels Warren Munday has provided services for the Northern Territory Government, Perkins Shipping, Darwin Convention Centre, Northern Territory Cattlemen's Association, Darwin International Airport, Masonic Homes, MacMahon Holdings, Cridlands MB and others. Resources sector clients include Arafura Resources, GBS Gold, Compass Resources, Cameco, Paladin Energy, HNC (Australia) Resources, APA Group and Tellus Holdings.

Michels Warren Munday represented the interests of the cattle industry in response to live export animal cruelty controversy, which first emerged in June 2011.

In October 2015, employee Elena Madden purchased Michels Warren Munday and became the firm's Managing Director. Jane Munday remained with the firm as a senior adviser.

=== Uranium mining ===
Michels Warren Munday has participated in uranium mining industry events, including conferences run by the AusIMM and the Annual Geoscience Exploration Seminar in the Northern Territory. The firm's uranium sector clients include Cameco and Paladin Energy (owners of the Angela-Pamela uranium deposit) and Arafura Resources, which is developing a rare earths project at Nolan's Bore, from which uranium will also be produced as a secondary product.
