= Rare-earth industry in Australia =

Rare-earth elements (REEs) are a group of 17 chemically similar lustrous silvery-white soft heavy metals. They are highly sought-after as they have diverse applications in electrical and electronic components, lasers, glass, magnetic materials, and industrial processes. Many of these components are used to produce clean energy, as well as in defence industries around the world. Rare-earths are to be distinguished from critical minerals, which are materials of strategic or economic importance that are defined differently by different countries, and rare-earth minerals, which are minerals that contains one or more rare-earth elements as major metal constituents.

As of 2025, Australia has the fourth-largest reserves of REEs in the world (approximately 5 per cent of global reserves), and is also the fourth-largest producer of rare-earths (around 8 per cent of global production). However, it does not have facilities for processing them, and exports its minerals to China for processing. The largest Australian REE companies include Lynas Corporation, Iluka Resources, and Arafura Rare Earths. In October 2025 Australia signed an agreement with the United States which provides US investment to develop several projects in Australia.

== History of production ==
In 2011, Australia produced 1,995 tonnes of rare-earths. In 2017, China produced 81% of the world's rare-earth supply, mostly in Inner Mongolia. In 2018, Australia was the world's second-largest producer, and the only other major producer, with 15% of world production. The Browns Range mine, located 160 km (99 mi) south-east of Halls Creek in northern Western Australia, was under development in 2018, and was positioned to become the first significant dysprosium producer outside of China.

By 2021, Australia was the fourth largest producer of rare-earths in the world, with a total production of 19,958 tonnes.

=== 2024 world ranking ===
According to the US Geological Survey's February 2025 report on rare-earth elements, Australia ranks fourth in terms of REE reserves (in tonnes of rare-earth oxide equivalent) in 2024:

1. China: 44 million metric tons
2. Brazil: 21 million metric tons
3. India: 6.9 million metric tons
4. Australia: 5.7 million metric tons

It was also fourth in terms of production in 2024:

1. China: 270,000 metric tons
2. US: 45,000 metric tons
3. Myanmar: 31,000 metric tons
4. Australia: 13,000 metric tons

Australia is estimated to have around 5 per cent of global reserves, and accounts for around 8 per cent of global production.

== Mines and projects ==
Australia is a major source of rare-earth minerals but has to send them offshore to China, its biggest trade partner, to process them, as it does not yet (as of 2025) possess processing facilities. As of August 2025 the largest Australian REE companies in terms of stocks are Lynas Corporation; Iluka Resources; Brazilian Rare Earths (whose 1,410 km^{2} (540 sq mi) of mining claims are in the state of Bahia, Brazil); Arafura Rare Earths; and Northern Minerals, whose main development is in Browns Range, Western Australia. The Australian Government is considering the possibility of nationalising Northern Minerals, as 17% of the company is in the hands of a few China-linked investors who have refused to sell their shares, and this is considered a security risk.

The Mount Weld project, owned by Lynas Corporation, is one of the earliest rare-earth mines in Australia, having opened in 2011, and remains the largest as of 2022. It is located in Laverton Shire, Western Australia. In late 2022 Lynas announced a major expansion, aiming to increase production of neodymium and praseodymium by 50% to around 10,500 tonnes per annum by 2025. It was awarded a contract by the US Defense Department in the early 2020s, involving a project in Texas. Lynas is the only significant producer of heavy rare earths, in particular dysprosium oxide, apart from China. Processing is done at its facility in Malaysia. In early October 2025, the American company Noveon Magnetics, based in San Marcos, Texas, the only one making permanent magnets in the US, signed an agreement with Lynas to form a strategic partnership, intended to develop a scalable US supply chain for the magnets.

Since the early 1990s, Iluka Resources has been producing monazite and xenotime as by-products of processing mineral sands that produce zircon and titanium dioxide at Eneabba, Western Australia. These byproducts have an estimated value of US$650m (£440m) in 2025, and have been stockpiled in a disused mining hole at Eneabba. In 20222, Iluka completed the construction of a Narngulu mineral separation plant, that separates the monazite. The plant produces a 90% monazite concentrate that will be input to a new fully-integrated rare-earths refinery at Eneabba. From 2027, neodymium, praseodymium, dysprosium, terbium, and other rare-earth elements will be produced at the facility. The plant is aiming to supply a significant proportion of Western demand for rare-earths. The stockpile will supply refinery until around 2032, and it is intended that other miners will sell their ore to Iluka, which will refine it and sell the product to other countries.

As of 2025 the Nolans Project in the Northern Territory is under development by Arafura Rare Earths, having received support from the Australian Government in the form of a loan and grants package in 2024. The Nolans Bore rare-earths-phosphate-uranium-thorium (REE-P-U-Th) deposit is its main asset, being one of the largest and most intensively explored deposits of its type globally. It will include a mine, processing plant, along with related infrastructure, at the site, which is 135 km (84 mi) north of Alice Springs. The project is particularly focused on neodymium and praseodymium (NdPr), which are crucial for technologies such as EVs and wind turbines. The site is one of the world's largest undeveloped sources of these elements, potentially supplying up to 4-5% of the world's magnet rare earths.

RZ Resources is an Australian-owned mining and processing company that deals in critical minerals, including titanium, zircon, and rare-earths. The company was established in 2012 in southern New South Wales. Its flagship project is the Copi mine project, located 75 km (47 mi) west of Wentworth, New South Wales, and one of the largest critical minerals deposits in the world. The project aims to produce both light and heavy rare earths. In September 2025, RZ received funding from financing from Export-Import Bank of the United States (EXIM), which was the first time an Australian critical minerals company had received EXIM support since 2013.

Other projects and mines in Australia include:

- Dubbo mine at Dubbo, New South Wales, which is being developed by Australian Strategic Minerals in partnership with Hyundai, with plans to process the ore in South Korea; a recipient of a government grant
- Koppamurra project, owned by Australian Rare Earths, in South Australia, near its eastern border with Victoria; a recipient of a government grant
- the proposed Yangibana mine, covering 650 km^{2} (250 sq mi) on Gifford Creek Station in Western Australia, owned by Hastings Technology Metals, which has estimated reserves of around 7.7 million tonnes, with a rare-earth composition of 1.13%; production expected to begin in 2026

The Australian company Brazilian Rare Earths has 1,410 km^{2} (540 sq mi) of mining claims are in the state of Bahia in Brazil.

As of October 2025, Australia has 89 active rare-earth exploration projects, according to the Center for Strategic and International Studies, which exceeds the number for any other country.

After the October 2021 deal with the US, the first project to be funded under the framework is the Alcoa-Sojitz Gallium Recovery Project in Wagerup, Western Australia. Up to USD$200 million in funding from the US will help to finance the project, which will provide up to 10 per cent of total global gallium supply. Gallium is an essential component in the manufacture of microchips, and is only produced as a byproduct of mining bauxite. Australia has the second-largest reserves of bauxite in the world. Sojitz is a Japanese company, which will fund half of the project. Sojitz Blue is an Australian subsidiary of Sojitz Corporation, established in 2002 that acquired various mining projects in Queensland, including Gregory Crinum in 2019. The second project is the Arafura Nolans project in the Northern Territory.

== Processing facility ==
Australia's first rare-earth processing facility is under construction in Sydney, due for completion in 2026. It is owned by Australian Nuclear Science and Technology Organisation (ANSTO), a government body, and will process rare earths found in clay. It will be used by rare-earth companies from across Australia, with Australian Rare Earths's proposed Koppamurra mining project first to use it.

== Government policies and trading partners ==
Following the publication of its "Critical Minerals Strategy 2023–2030" in June 2023, in November 2024, the Albanese government announced its "International Partnerships in Critical Minerals" program, which will provide AU$40 million in grants across eight projects.

The government's Critical Minerals Strategic Reserve plan is due for publication at the end of 2026. The intention of this plan is to introduce mechanisms such as a price floor that bring stability to the market and reduce price volatility. The Strategic Reserve includes two new mechanisms:

- National Offtake Agreements, by which the government acquires agreed amounts of critical minerals from commercial suppliers, through voluntary contractual arrangements, or alternatively establish an option to purchase at a given price, securing these assets
- Selective stockpiling, by which certain key critical minerals, produced under offtake agreements, will be stockpiled

According to Jenny Bloomfield of the Lowy Institute: "Geoeconomically, Australia's rise as a critical minerals power could help reshape global trade flows... Geopolitically, Australia's rare earths leverage enhances its strategic weight. By offering trusted, clean, transparent and secure supply chains, Australia strengthens its alliances, hedges against coercion, and asserts its role as a stabilising force in the Indo-Pacific".

=== United States ===
On 21 October 2025, the Prime Minister of Australia, Anthony Albanese, met with the President of the United States, Donald Trump, in Washington, D.C.. After China had announced restrictions on their rare-earths, the U.S. was keen to find a new supplier. The two leaders signed a deal over rare-earths and other critical minerals (Note: Rare-earth elements or minerals are distinct from minerals or materials described as critical minerals or raw materials, which refers to materials that are considered to be of strategic or economic importance to a country. There is no single list, but individual governments compile lists of materials that are critical for their own economies. However the two terms are often used interchangeably, especially in the U.S.) that are needed for commercial clean energy production and technologically advanced military hardware. They each committed to provide at least US$1bn (A$1.54bn) towards a number of projects worth $US8.5bn (A$13bn) in both countries over six months. Albanese mentioned two projects by name in the media announcement: Alcoa and Arafura Rare Earths. Alcoa has alumina refineries in Western Australia, and it is proposed to build a gallium plant at one of them. Arafura, when complete, is anticipated to produce about 5% of the world's rare-earth oxides, in particular those used to manufacture permanent magnets used in electric vehicles and wind turbines. Seven companies in total will receive financial backing from the Export-Import Bank of the United States (EXIM).

The full framework between the two countries has been published on the Australian Department of Industry, Science and Resources website. The deal has been well-received by the Minerals Council of Australia, the Australian rare-earths industry, and the markets.

The deal is important to the United States because, apart from rare-earths' applications in technology and clean energy, they are used in many components of the US Defense Force, including F-35 fighter jets, submarines, lasers, satellites, and Tomahawk missiles.

It is also seen as a major shift in economic alliances. Carl Capolingua, senior editor on the Australian website Market Index, writes "By formalising shared control over critical supply chains, Washington and Canberra are effectively creating an "allied metals bloc", that investors may see as part of "the West building redundancy against Chinese dominance in the clean-energy and defence supply chain that will help shape the next century". The deal brings the US and Australia closer, although China remains Australia's biggest trading partner. Australia sells a third of all its exports to China, principally iron ore and coal, but also agricultural products such as wine and beef.

=== Other trade partners ===
Also in October 2025, Australia signed a bilateral agreement with Canada, to collaborate "on everything to do with critical minerals". In February 2026, the Australian Strategic Policy Institute published a report in which it advised the federal government to shift its focus from the US, and instead look at Australia's strategic alliances, in particular Canada (the world's other major explorer and producer of critical minerals), as well as Japan, South Korea, and Malaysia. Report author Ian Satchwell, adjunct professor at the University of Queensland, sees Canada as "not as a competitor but as a strategic collaborator in shared supply-chain development". He also warned of continuing uncertainties owing to President Trump's ever-changing tariffs, and wrote that China has been allowed to become the most powerful power in the rare earths sector, manipulating prices.

== Advantages and issues ==
Australia has more than 40 critical minerals as identified by the U.S. Geological Survey. It also has strong capital markets and a good labour force, and is a leading centre of mining expertise.

Although the October 2025 US deal puts money into the Australian rare-earth industry, at this point the oxide still needs to be transported out of Australia for processing, as Australia does not yet have manufacturing facilities in place. Processing of rare-earths is challenging because they occur in such low concentrations and are difficult to isolate. If not managed carefully, the chemicals used in processing can cause environmental damage. Permits for new mines take time, building it can take years, and it also takes several years for the processing plants to be set up.

A US-Australia Critical Minerals Supply Security Response Group is being established under the leadership of the US Secretary of Energy and the Australian Minister for Resources to identify priority minerals and supply vulnerabilities and to develop a coordinated plan to accelerate delivery of processed minerals under this Framework.

In November 2025, a Four Corners investigation highlighted the fact that Australia is supplying China with zirconium, which is essential to its production of hypersonic missiles as well as its nuclear program. Around 41 per cent of China's imports of the critical mineral come from Australia, and China has been re-exporting some of it to Russia, with President Putin using it in his war against Ukraine. Two zirconium mines in Western Australia are run by Chinese companies, and the parent company of Image Resources, LB Group, is involved in trading with Russia. China's zirconium exports to Russia have increased by more than 300 per cent since Russia's invasion of Ukraine. The other WA mine exporting its product to China is Thunderbird Mine, near Broome.
