= RZ Resources =

Australian mining operation

RZ Resources Limited
- Type: Public company
- Traded as: ASX: RRG
- Industry: Mining
- Founded: 2012
- Headquarters: Brisbane, Queensland, Australia
- Key people: David Fraser (Chairman); Campbell Jones (CEO) (November 2025)
- Products: Ilmenite, zircon, rutile, monazite, leucoxene, xenotime
- Website: rzresources.com

RZ Resources (RZ') ASX: RRZ, formerly known as Relentless Resources Limited, is an Australian mining and processing company that focuses on rare-earth minerals and critical minerals. Its Copi mining project in far south-western New South Wales is based on one of the largest critical minerals deposits in the world. Its mineral separation plant (MSP) in Brisbane, Queensland, will process the minerals. The MSP is expected to be operational early 2027, ahead of Copi starting to extract product in late 2028.

== History ==
RZ Resources was established in 2012 by David Fraser in southern New South Wales, as Relentless Resources Limited.

In 2015, the company entered into a joint venture giving it control of three tenements in the Murray Basin, acquiring 100 per cent ownership two years later, along with a further five tenements in the area.

In May 2021, the company was renamed RZ Resources Ltd, and in that year acquired a mineral separation plant (MSP) on the Brisbane River mouth in Brisbane, Queensland.

In June 2025, RZ signed an agreement with Japanese company JX Advanced Metals Corporation, its initial investment being A$20 million, and further options for two additional investments of A$5 million.

In September 2025, RZ received funding from financing from Export-Import Bank of the United States (EXIM), which was the first time an Australian critical minerals company had received EXIM support since 2013.

In early November 2025, the major Japanese conglomerate Marubeni signed an agreement with RZ to invest in and collaborate with the development of the RZ mineral sands project in New South Wales, as well as RZ's existing mineral separation and processing plant in Brisbane, Queensland. Marubeni will invest A$15 million, and provides options to obtain equity of up to 3.375% and possible increase to 5% with further investment, as well as particular rights relating to marketing and collaboration.

== Description and governance ==
RZ Resources is based in Brisbane, Queensland. It is focused on extracting and processing rare-earth elements and critical minerals that are essential for a number of modern technologies used in applications including defence and renewable energy production.

As of November 2025, founder David Fraser is the executive chairman, while Campbell Jones is CEO. The company is listed on the Australian Securities Exchange, code RRZ.

== Projects ==
=== Copi ===
RZ's flagship project is the Copi mine project, located 75 km (47 mi) west of Wentworth, New South Wales, in the Murray Basin. It is one of the largest critical minerals deposits in the world. The project aims to produce both light and heavy rare earths, including rutile, ilmenite, zircon, monazite, leucoxene, and xenotime. Rutile and leucoxene are feedstocks for titanium.

Between 2020 and 2023, RZ was cautioned and received a penalty notice from the New South Wales Resources Regulator owing to at least 22 breaches of mining rules, including not properly rehabilitating the land after exploration, and for providing false and misleading information to the regulator. In 2023 the company paid A$160,000 in compensation to the community. Experts and local farmers criticised their EIS, saying that it was deficient in detail with regard to radiation risk, related to the uranium and thorium which are present in the mineral sands.

RZ submitted its environmental impact statement (EIS) to the Government of New South Wales in May 2024. As of June 2024, the company was planning to mine the deposit over a period of around 17 years, with 240 new jobs created during its operational life.

The mine is expected to be operational by the end of 2028.

=== Mineral separation plant ===
RZ's MSP, located in Brisbane, is the only major processing facility on the east coast of Australia. Its importance lies in the future ability to export finished products directly, without having to send them to China for further processing, as has been the case.

The plant was previously operated by Consolidated Rutile, Iluka, and Sibelco, and is being upgraded by RZ. After the Copi mine is producing product, it will use around half the capacity of the plant. This will mean that other Australian critical minerals mines can send material there to be processed. The facility is expected to be operational in early 2027. As the Copi mine is not expected to start producing product until late 2028, the plant would start by processing minerals from other Australian mines.
