= Transactive energy =

Transactive energy refers to the economic and control techniques used to manage the flow or exchange of energy within an existing electric power system in regards to economic and market based standard values of energy. It is a concept that is used in an effort to improve the efficiency and reliability of the power system, pointing towards a more intelligent and interactive future for the energy industry.

Transactive energy promotes a network environment for distributed energy nodes as opposed to the traditional hierarchical grid structure. The network structure allows for communication such that all levels of energy generation and consumption are able to interact with one another, a concept that is also known as interoperability. In transactive energy, interoperability refers to the ability of involved systems to connect and exchange energy information while maintaining workflow and utility constraints. The network is exponentially more complex than traditional control of generating sources because the demand side of the grid offers millions points of control in contrast with an average 10 to 20 power plant points of control on the supply side.

== Europe-based Efforts ==
=== Energy Flexibility Platform and Interface (EF-Pi) ===
The goal of the Energy Flexibility Platform and Interface (EF-Pi) approach is to decouple Smart Grid services from the customer appliances.

This opens up the markets and gives the customer freedom of choice in Smart Grid services. The End user should be able to combine it with all the connected appliances they already own in their house, without losing control and ownership.

The EF-Pi is an open-source software platform that runs on low-power hardware located at a convenient place in the building. The EF-Pi communicates directly with smart appliances inside the building. The EF-Pi has an easy-to-use interface, which the end user can use to configure and control their own appliances and get insight in how their appliances are functioning.

The core of the EF-Pi is the Energy Flexibility Interface (EFI). The EFI is a generic interface which appliance manufacturers can use to describe energy flexibility, and which Smart Grid service developers can use to describe how they want to use this flexibility. The EFI effectively provides a common language for both sides, facilitating interoperability between all Smart Grid services and smart appliances.

== United States-based Efforts ==
=== Pacific Northwest Demonstration Project ===
The Pacific Northwest Demonstration Project is a 5-year U.S. Department of Energy (DOE) funded research and development project created for the purpose of exploring transactive energy concepts at the regional scale that was completed in June 2015. The project participants included 11 utilities, two universities, and multiple technology companies to span five Pacific Northwest states: Washington, Oregon, Idaho, Montana, and Wyoming.

The project evaluated 55 different technologies that could help reduce energy use and power bills, including smart meters, advanced energy storage, and voltage controls. It also tested and determined the potential benefits of transactive controls within a regional power grid. Transactive control is a technology developed by the Pacific Northwest National Laboratory (PNNL) that entails "automatic, electronic transactions between energy providers and users about whether or not to sell or buy power." In order to test this, transactive signals were used that would exchange information about predicted price and availability of power in real-time. This information was updated every 5 minutes. When peak power demand was predicted, the transactive control was designed to reduce power use. The project confirmed that transactive control technology works and can help improve energy efficiency and reliability, as well as reduce energy cost and encourage renewable energy usage.

Public involvement was determined as a key parameter for smart grid deployment. Participants of the project emphasized the importance of customer engagement when new technologies are being implemented.

The results of the project defined the next steps for implementing and improving transactive energy technologies. Several of the project participants have decided to continue smart grid programs on their own, even though the demonstration project is now complete, and new projects have also arisen from the results of the demonstration.

=== GridSMART Demonstration Project ===
The gridSMART® Demonstration Project was implemented by AEP Ohio from 2009 to 2013. The project tested various new technologies for smart grid implementation on a local level including smart meters, distribution automation, volt-var optimization, consumer programs, plug-in electric vehicles, and smart appliances. AEP utilized Grid Command, a tool that was developed in partnership with Battelle in order to model much of the gridSMART circuit layout. The next steps for the next phase of gridSMART were identified to be upgrading current technologies in order to better manage supply, reduce costs, and minimize the number of customers affected by outages. This has been proposed through the installation of smart meter technology, distribution automation circuit reconfiguration (DACR), and volt var optimization (VVO).

Testing included SMART Shift, a time-of-day rate plan that helps customers save money by load shifting and SMART Cooling, an air-conditioning technology that helps reduce peak demand in the summer. During the project, eView was developed to assist customers in monitoring their electric use and costs as well as estimating current month usage to measure against their energy budget. eView< is an in-home device that communicates with the smart meter through wireless technology and informs the consumer of the price of electricity and how much was being used.

The project helped AEP Ohio in determining what methods and solutions would best help the company move forward in the growing industry. It was emphasized that customer experience and feedback is a very valuable and effective method of learning how to deliver electricity efficiently to customers.

=== NIST Transactive Energy Challenge ===
The NIST Transactive Energy (TE) Challenge was designed to bring together researchers, companies, utilities and other grid stakeholders in order to explore the modeling and simulation platforms of TE, and the techniques that may be used to apply TE to real grid problems. This challenge is intended to encourage and promote the development of modeling and simulation tools for transactive energy, as well as the development of a transactive energy community in which organizations and individuals can work together to share data and knowledge in order to cooperatively advance transactive energy. It will demonstrate various transactive energy approaches and how it may improve the reliability and efficiency of the electric grid.

Various teams were formed to explore different pathways for TE:

- Business/Regulatory Models led by Edison Electric Institute (EEI)
- Reference Grids and Scenarios for TE Simulation led by National Electrical Manufacturers Association (NEMA)
- TE Demo for Microgrid Energy Management
- TE Interoperations and Abstract Interaction led by Navigant and Energy Mashup Lab

The NIST TE Challenge is expected to be completed in September 2016.

== Standards ==
There are no current global standards to facilitate transactive energy. In the United States, the IEEE has a working group called P825 — Meshing Smart Grid Interoperability Standards to Enable Transactive Energy Networks to develop transactive energy guidelines.
