= Mineral separation plant =

Processing facility for separating heavy minerals

A mineral separation plant (MSP), also known as a dry mill, is a type of mineral processing facility used especially in the processing of rare-earth minerals. It is often used to process minerals found in mineral sands, some of which are defined as critical minerals. These include rutile, ilmenite, leucoxene, and zircon. It is distinct from, although sometimes used in conjunction with, a wet concentration plant (WCP).

== Background ==
Mineral sands, which are found in old beach or river systems or sand dunes, contain high concentrations of heavy minerals. There are two principal product streams in the industry:

- Titanium dioxide minerals, comprising rutile, ilmenite and leucoxene
- Zircon

These minerals contain rare-earth elements that are essential for a number of modern technologies, used in applications including defence and renewable energy production.

== Description ==
A mineral separation plant, also known as a dry mill, separates the valuable minerals from mineral sands produced by a mining operation. They are sometimes used in conjunction with, or after, wet concentration plants (WCPs). The attritioning processing by the WCP cleans the mineral surfaces, enabling more efficient electrostatic separation by the MSP, and helping to reduce dust.

Various components of the MSP enable separation of the valuable elements, via screening, magnetic, electrostatic, and gravity separation circuits. They also enable capture of more products, such as monazite, that may be a by-product. Individual minerals are separated according to their different magnetic and electrical properties at different temperatures; the equipment may include electrical high tension rolls, high intensity magnets and electrostatic plate separators. Using electrostatic separators, rutile and ilmenite are separated from zircon and monazite. Magnetic separation is used to separate ilmenite and monazite from the non-magnetic rutile and zircon.

== Examples ==
China, which dominates global rare-earth processing (around 90%), has numerous MSPs, but its overall strength lies in its integration of many advanced separation techniques. Its MSPs include Astron Corporation's plant at Yingkou. Mining projects in Australia are increasingly developing MSPs in order to increase global exports, such as the MSP in Brisbane, acquired by RZ Resources in 2021. Iluka Resources' Narngulu mineral separation plant, near Geraldton, Western Australia, produces zircon and rutile products.

The Indian company Indian Rare Earths has MSPs in Tamil Nadu (Manavalakurichi unit) and Kerala, and a new one is under development in Odisha.
