= Public research and development =

Since the 1960s, private businesses in the U.S. have provided an increasing share of funding for research and development, as direct federal funding waned.

Public research and development (Public R&D) refers to the R&D activities related to public sectors, including governments, colleges and non-profit organizations. Public R&D include academic basic research, applied research and R&D grants and contracts to private sectors, where later two are known as 'R&D subsidy'. Public R&D could be understood as a funder or a performer of an R&D activity. According to National Science Foundation in U.S., in 2015, R&D expenditures performed by federal governments, local governments, colleges and non-profit organizations are 54, 0.6, 64, and 20 billions of dollars, respectively. Meanwhile, industries perform R&D expenditures of 356 billion dollars. Moreover, R&D expenditures funded by federal governments, local governments, colleges and non-profit organizations are 121, 4.3, 17, and 19 billions of dollars, respectively. R&D expenditures funded by industries are 333 billion dollars. In terms of R&D funders, public R&D to private R&D ratio is about 0.5.

Israel is the world leader as a percentage of GDP in public spending in research and development, the United States leads in total sums spent.

== Economic impacts ==
Economists have made significant strides to understand the dynamics of public R&D, along with its cascading effects.

== Productivity ==
Scholars generally propose that public R&D enhances industrial productivity (e.g., Levy and Terleckyj, 1983; Nadiri and Mamuneas, 1994).However, the improvement of productivity could result in R&D spill-over of public sectors, researcher movements and co-operation between public and private sectors.

== R&D investment of private sectors ==
Economists are particularly concerned about whether public R&D stimulates or crowds out the private sector R&D. It is generally known as a 'policy success', if the public R&D (especially the government R&D subsidy) could stimulate the R&D investment of private sectors. So far, there is no conclusive viewpoint in the literature (e.g., Toole, 2007; Cohen, Coval, and Malloy, 2011; Azoulay, Zivin, Li, and Sampat, 2018).

== Stock returns ==
Public R&D is also positively related to stock returns of industrial firms (Chen, Chen, Liang, and Wang, 2020). Although they show that abnormal returns based on public R&D ratio generate about 0.9% abnormal returns per month, and suggest that the positive relation could be interpreted by increased cash flow risks.

== Government R&D programs ==
=== European Union ===
The EU spent €352 billion on R&D in 2022, 2.22% of EU GDP. R&D as a percentage of GDP was highest in Belgium (3.44%), followed by Sweden (3.40%), Austria (3.20%) and Germany (3.13%) as of 2022.

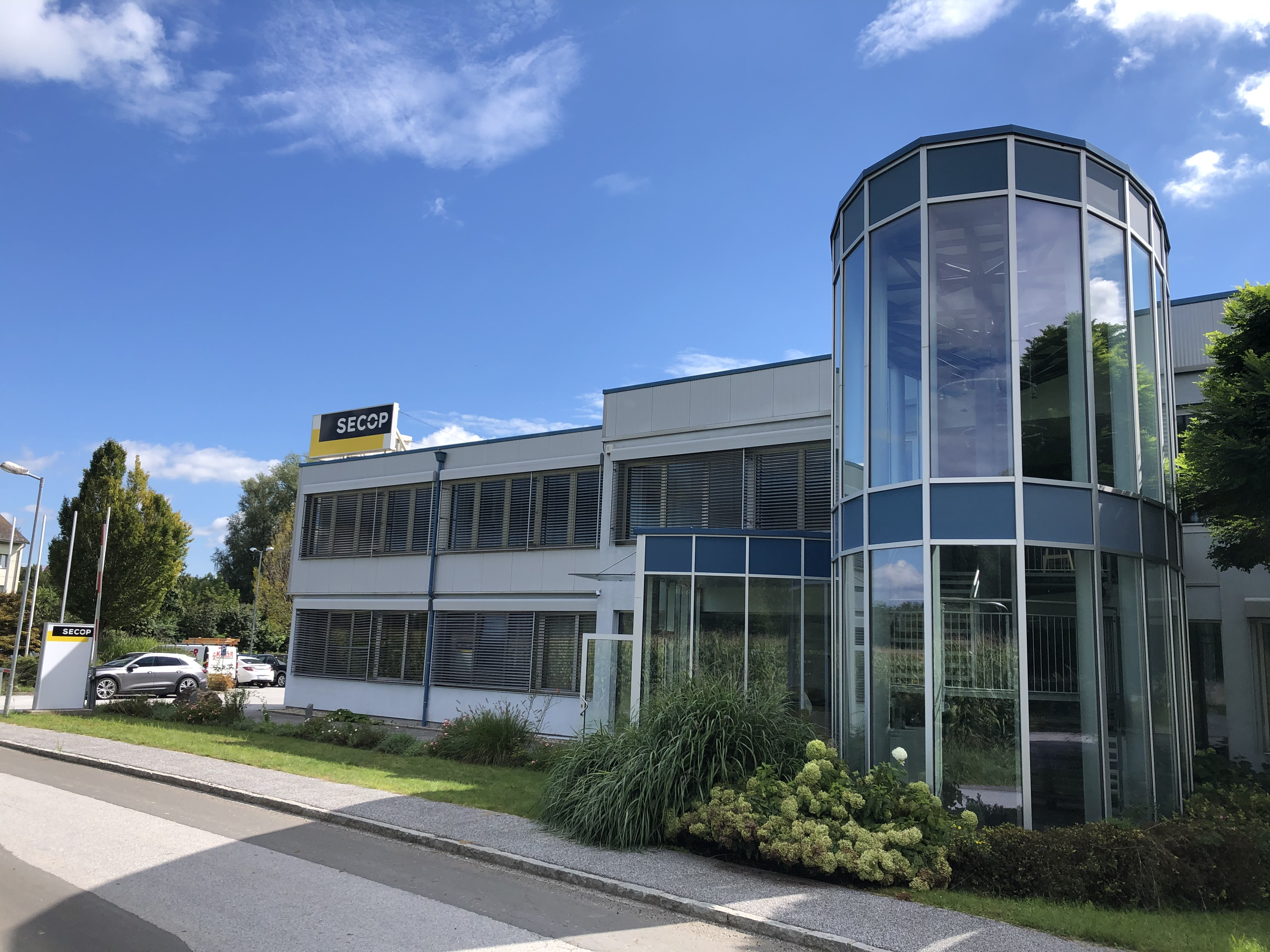
Secop R&D Center in Gleisdorf Austria

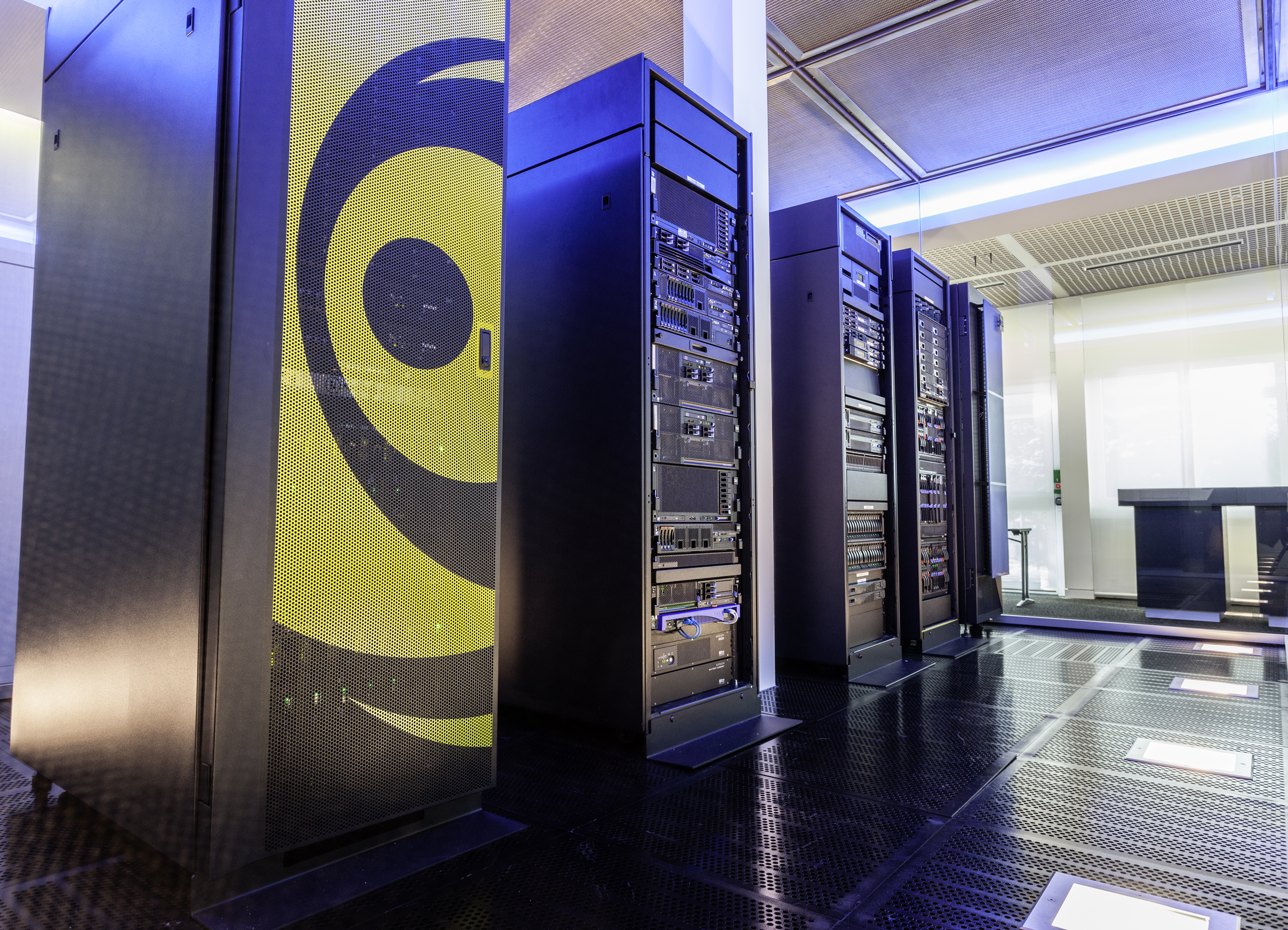
IBM Germany Research & Development

=== Israel ===
Israel leads the world in spending as a percentage of the economy on Research and development. Israel spent 6.02% of its GDP on R&D. Israel has focused on development on human capital investment with significant investment going toward knowledge based sectors of the economy.

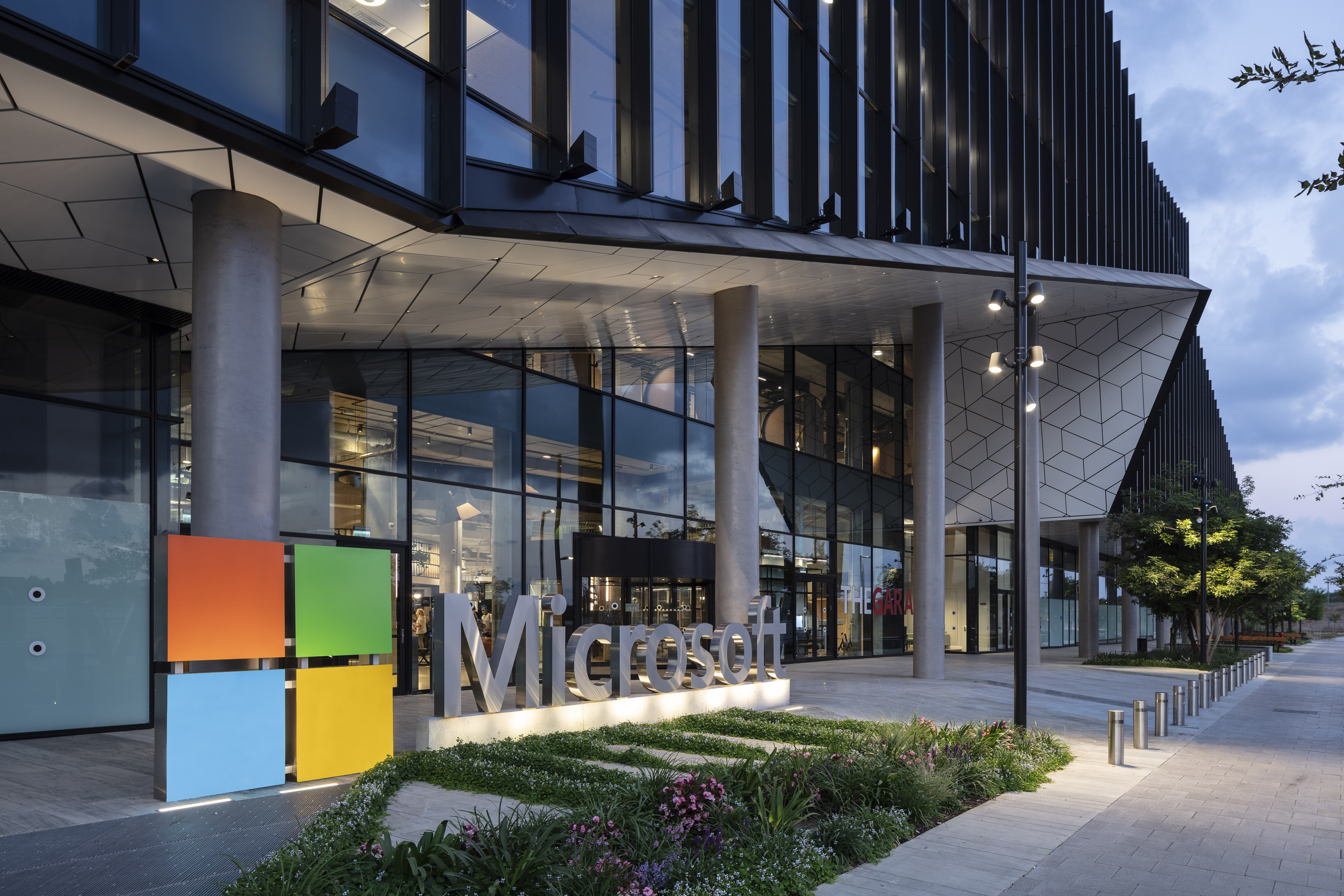
Microsoft Israel R&D Center

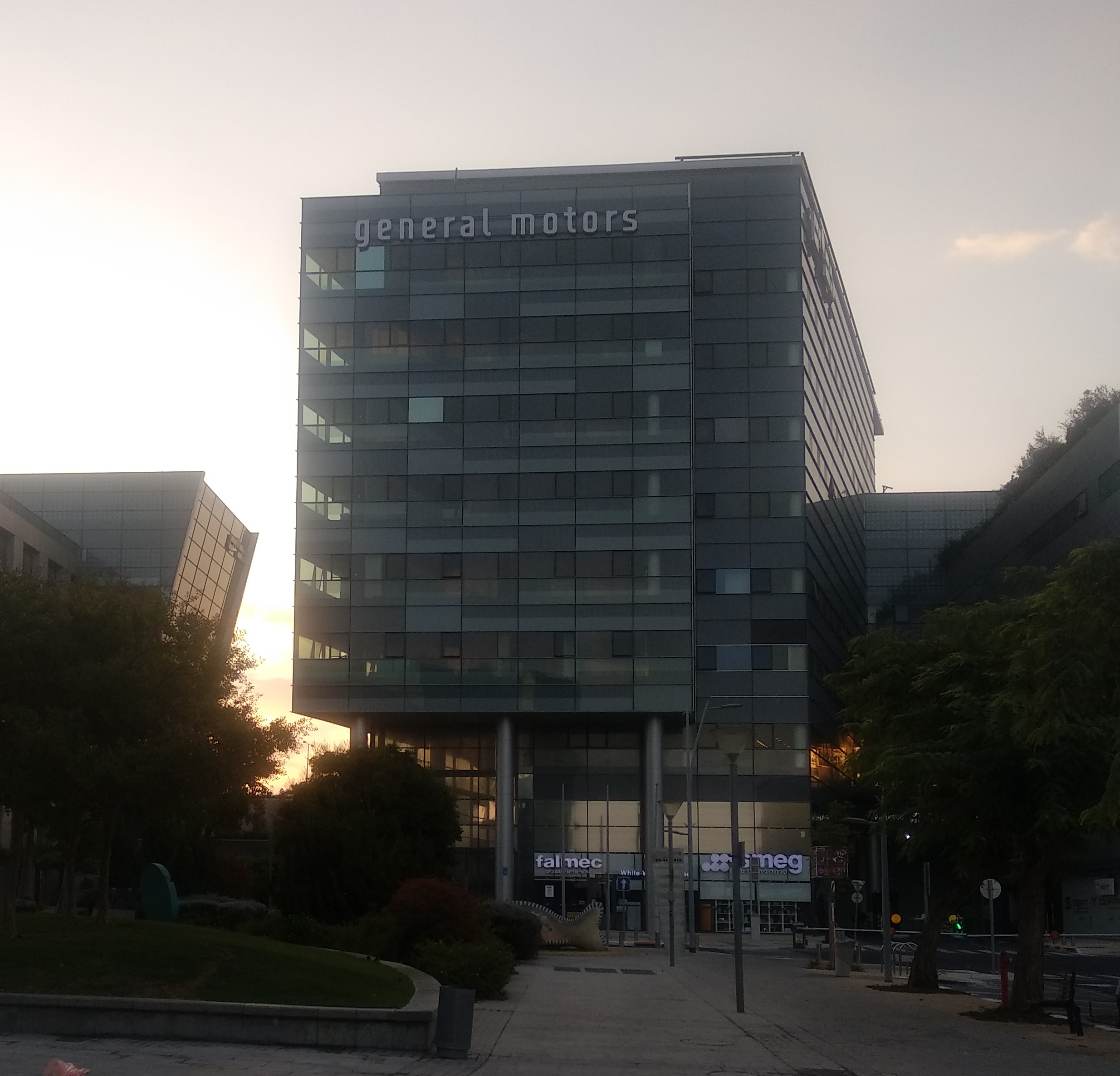
General Motors R&D, Israel

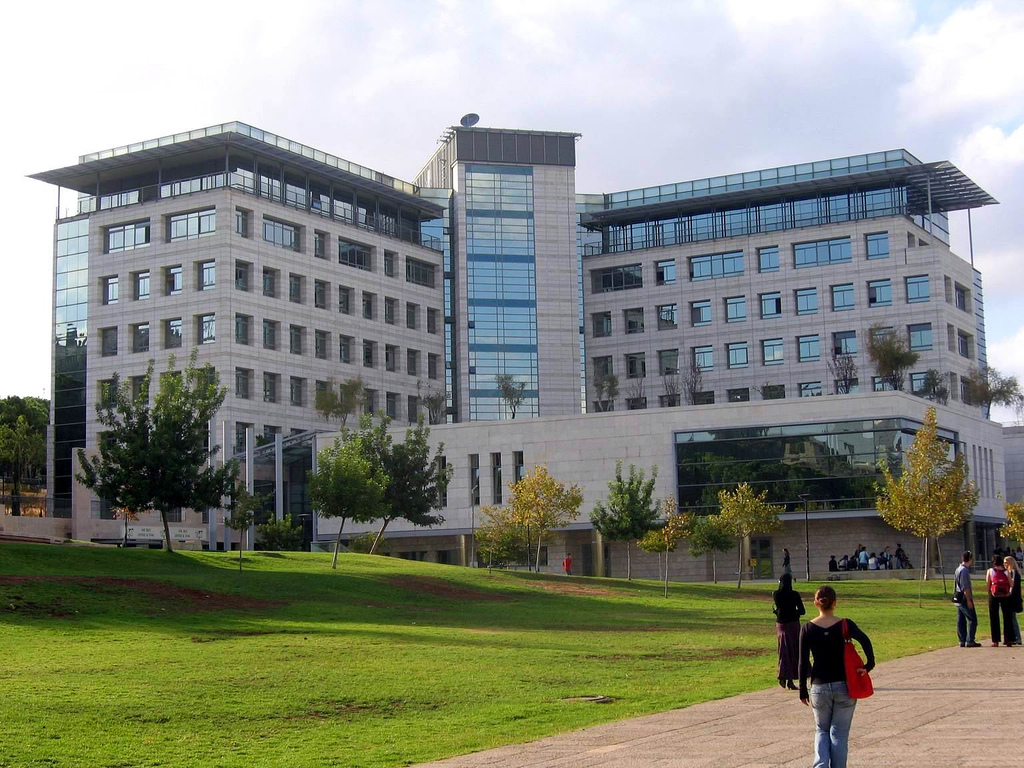
Technion, Computer Science faculty

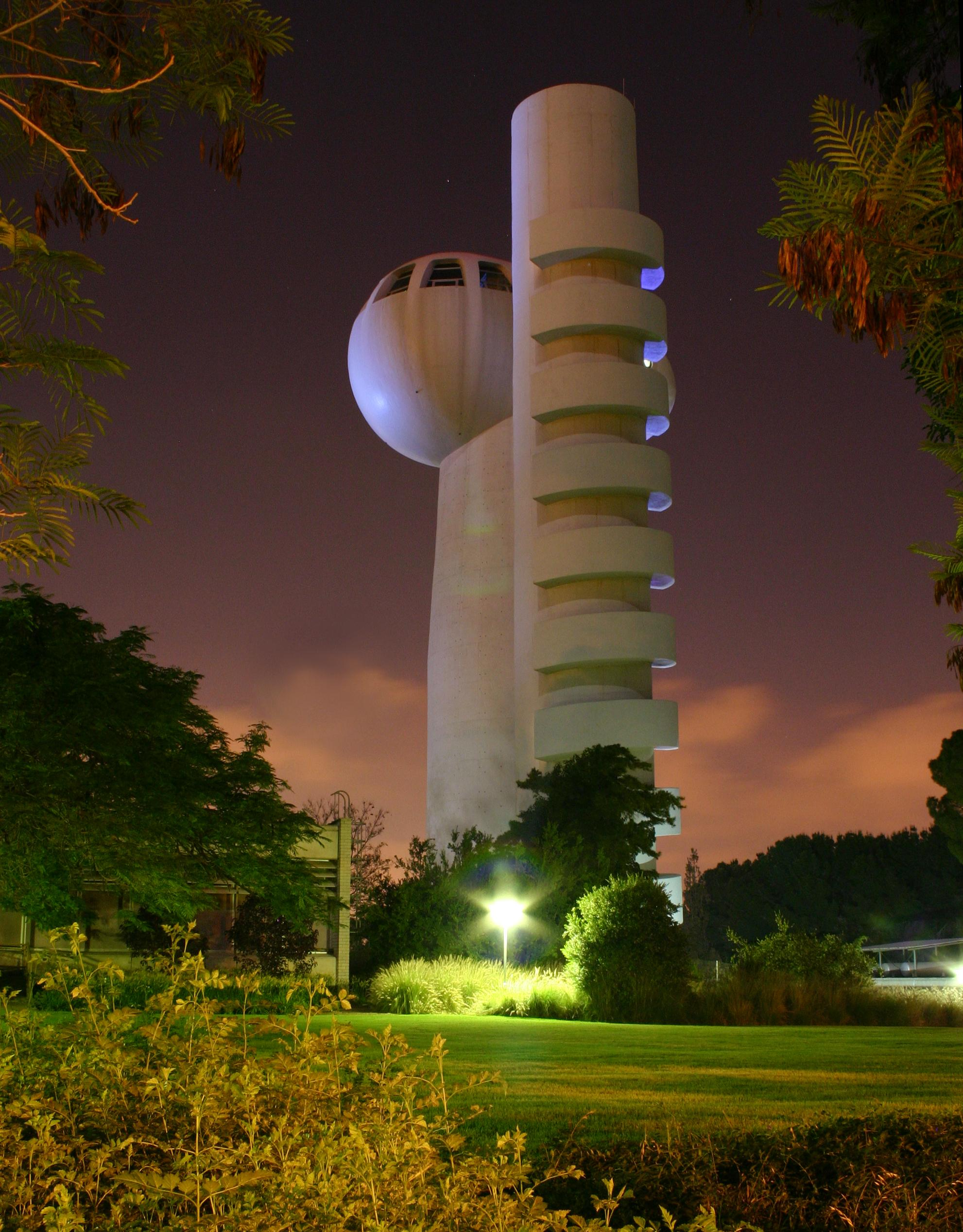
Weizmann Institute, koffler accelerator

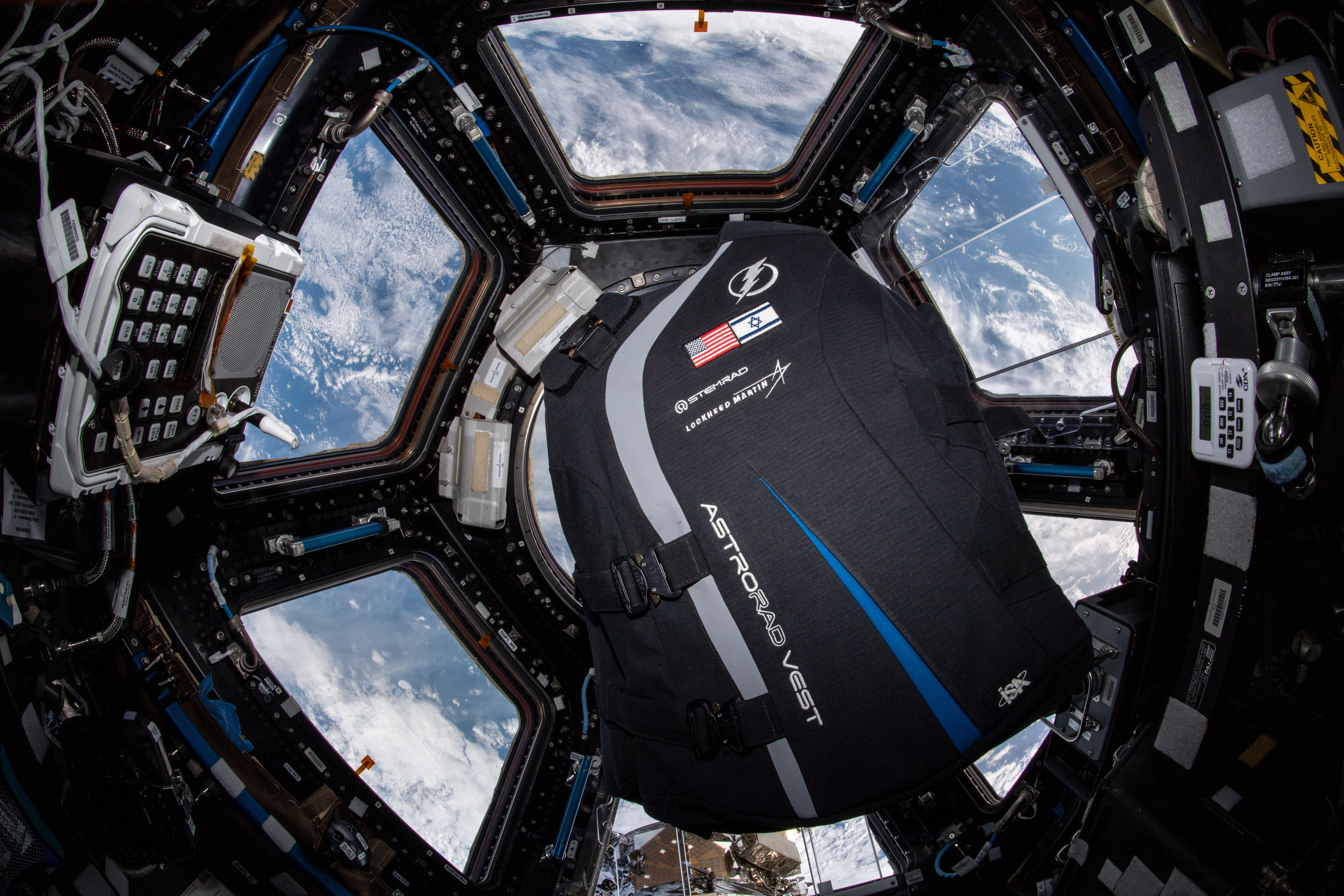
Israeli StemRad astronaut anti radiation suit, picture by NASA

=== United States ===
The United States spends the most on R&D in pure terms of investment. Federal research and development budget in the fiscal year of 2020 was $156 billion.

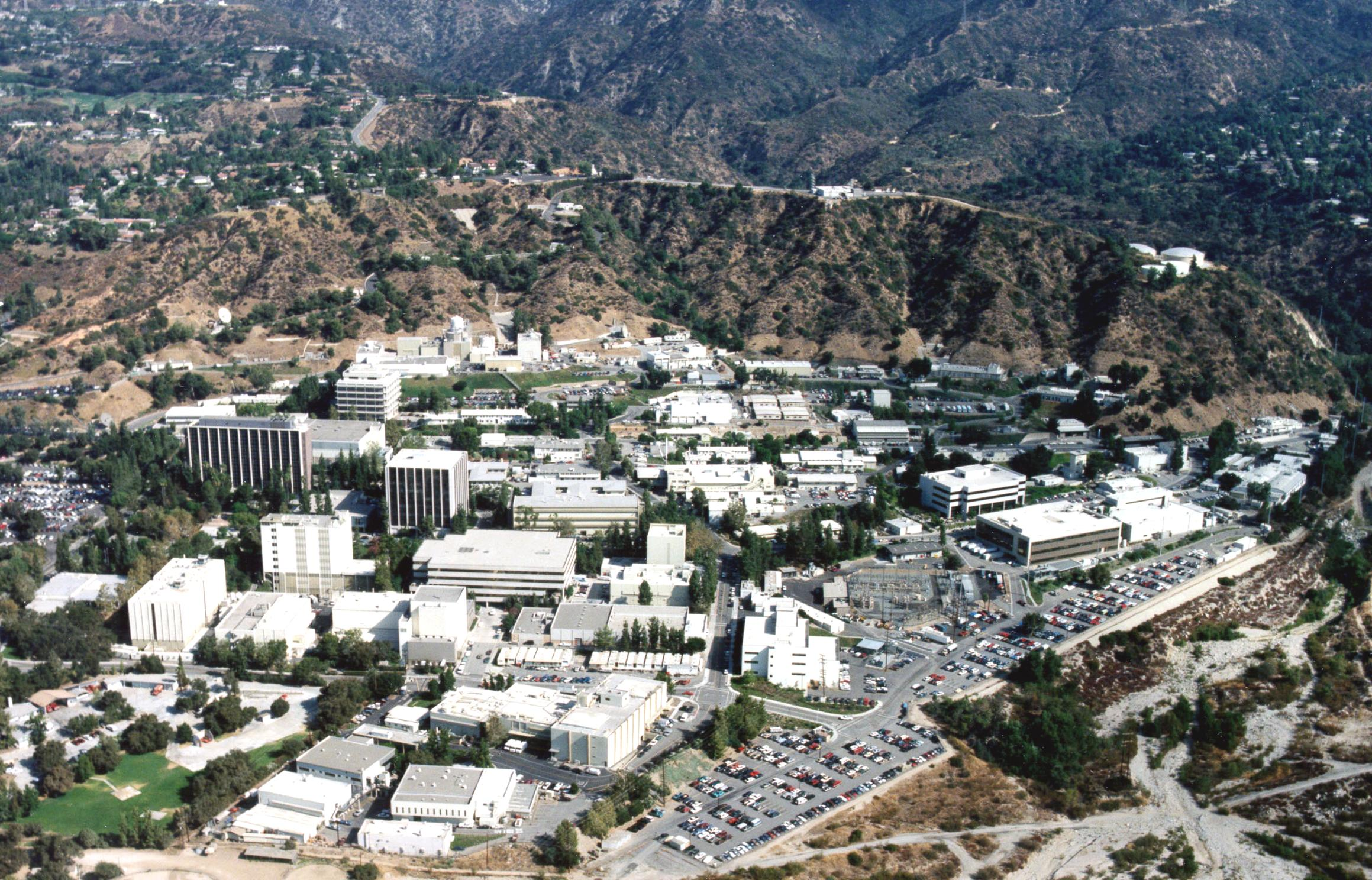
The Jet Propulsion Laboratory, California

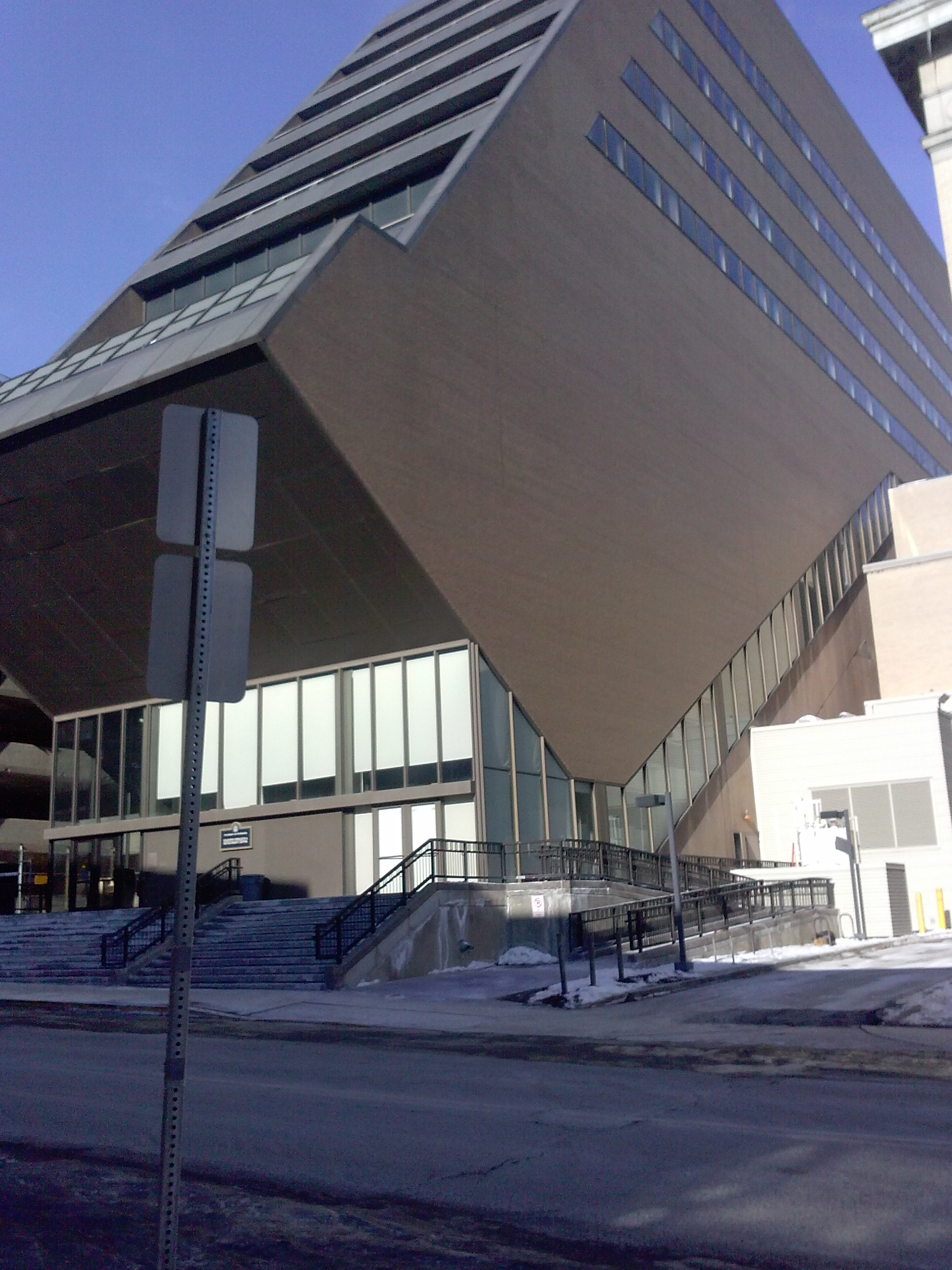
Learning Research and Development Center, Pittsburg

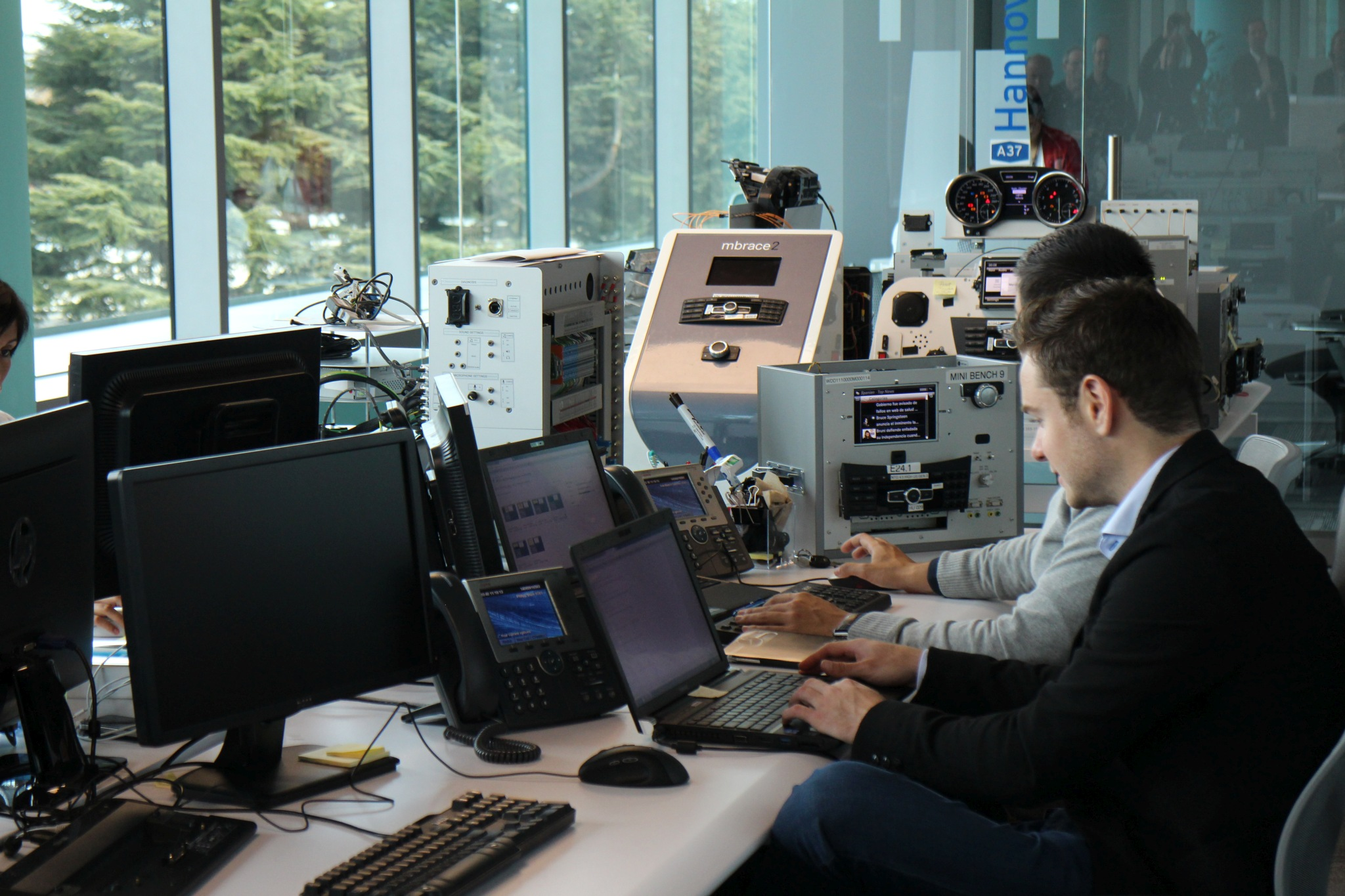
Mercedes Benz Research Development North America

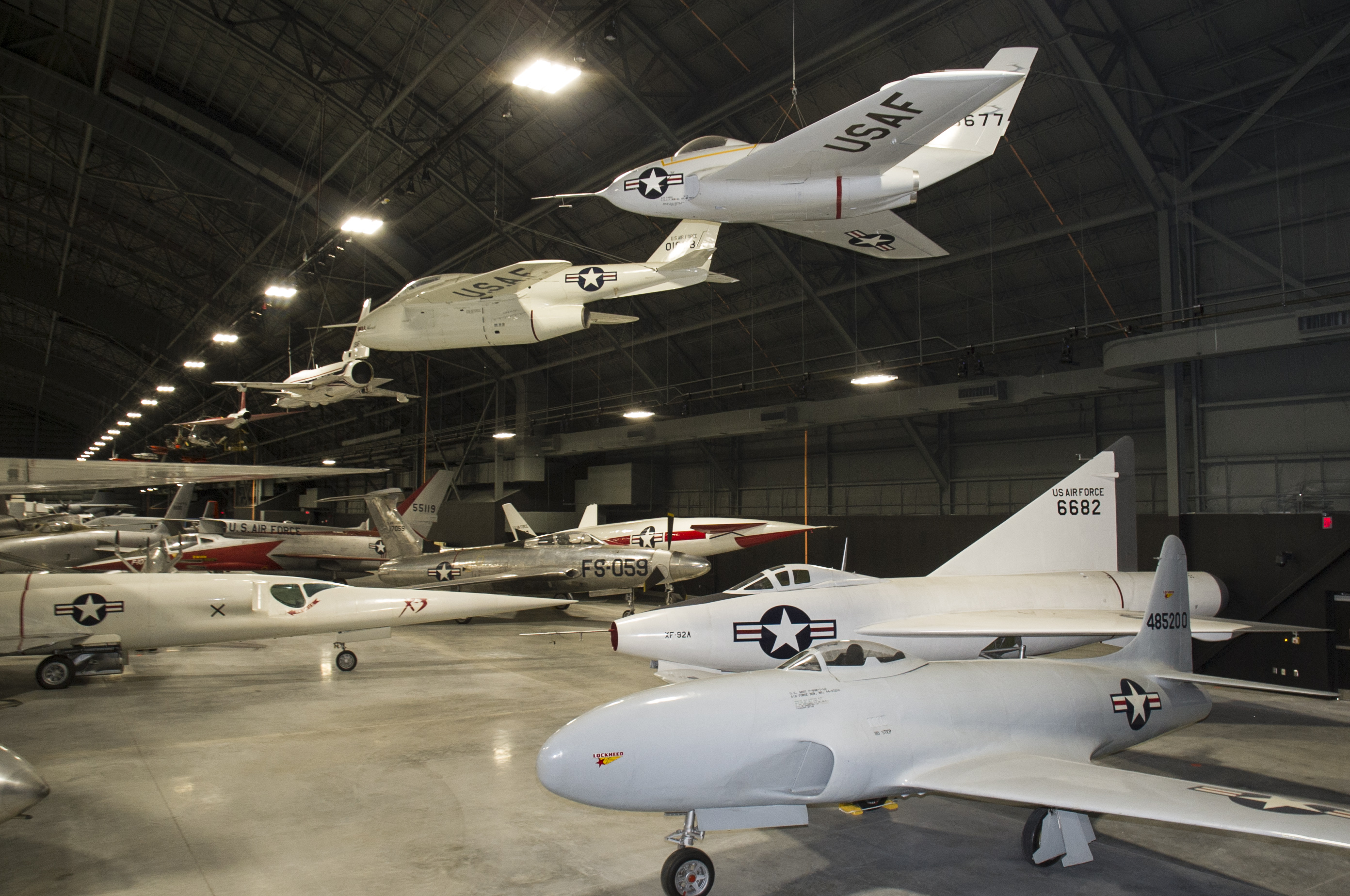
National Museum of the U.S. Air Force-Research and Development Gallery
