= Critical raw materials =

Designated by governments as critical for economies

Critical Minerals
Classification & Criteria
- Main components: Rare-earth elements, platinum-group metals, high-tech metals, battery materials
- Primary metrics: Supply risk, economic importance
- Primary users: High-tech electronics, green technology, defense, aerospace

Supply Chain & Geopolitics
- Dominant producer: China (~60% extraction, ~90% refining)
- Strategic reserves: National Defense Stockpile (US), European Critical Raw Materials Act framework
- Security pacts: Quad Critical Minerals Initiative Framework, Mineral Security Partnership (MSP)

Principal Applications
- Defense & Tech: Electric vehicle batteries, wind turbine permanent magnets, solar cells
- Semiconductors, radar systems, guided missile electronics, fiber optics

Critical raw materials (CRM), also referred to as critical materials or critical minerals, are raw materials designated by governments as critical for their economies. As definitions vary from country to country there is no detailed consensus of what a critical mineral is. Recurrent in various definitions is that critical minerals are important for national economies and national security and that they have vulnerable supply chains. To a lesser extent some definitions mention the role of critical minerals in science, new technologies and energy transition.

Critical raw materials usually include technology-critical elements, rare-earth elements, and/or strategic materials. Demand has risen and prices have dropped for some critical minerals, due to the demand driven by the expansion of renewable energy technologies.

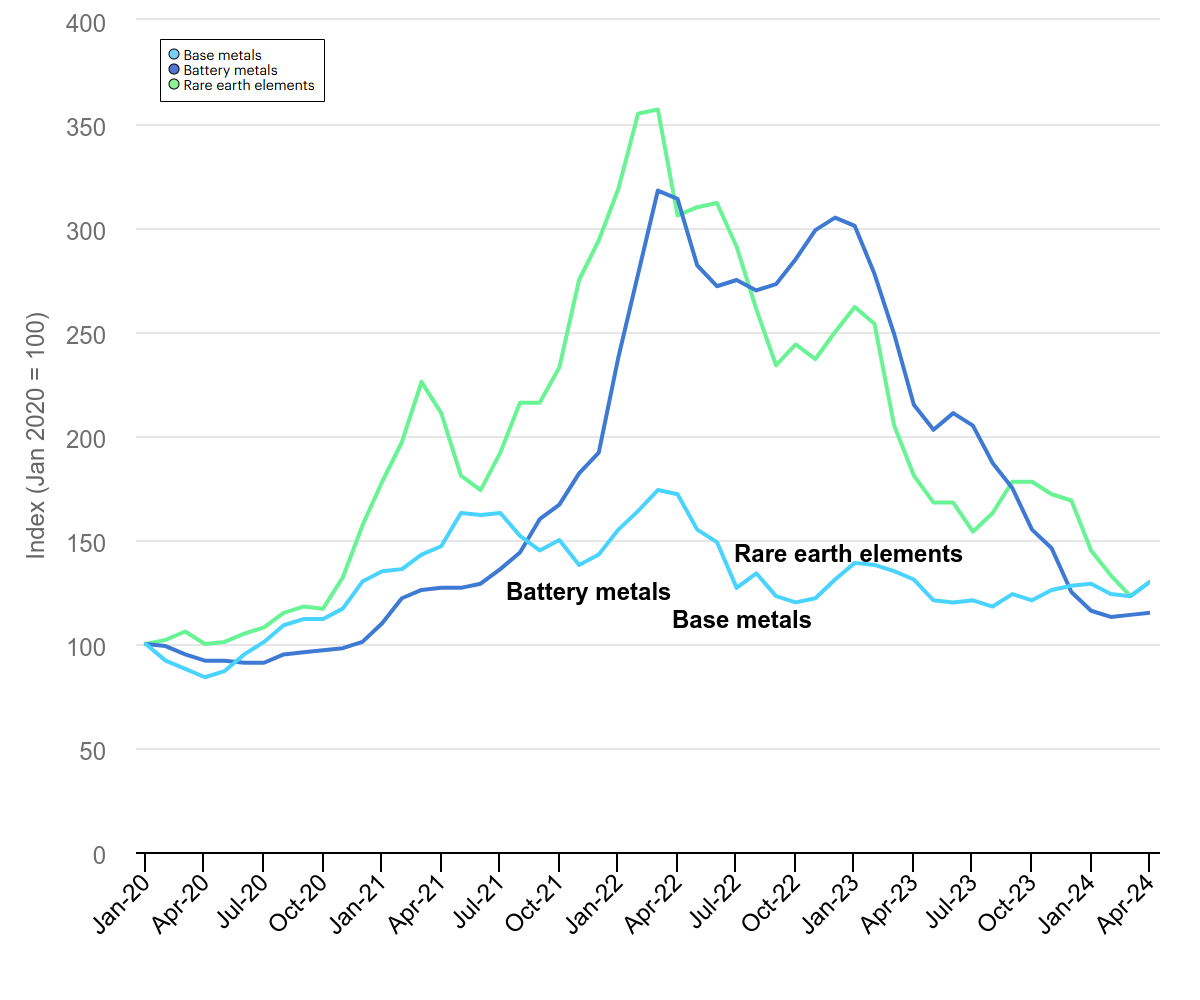
Price movements of critical materials

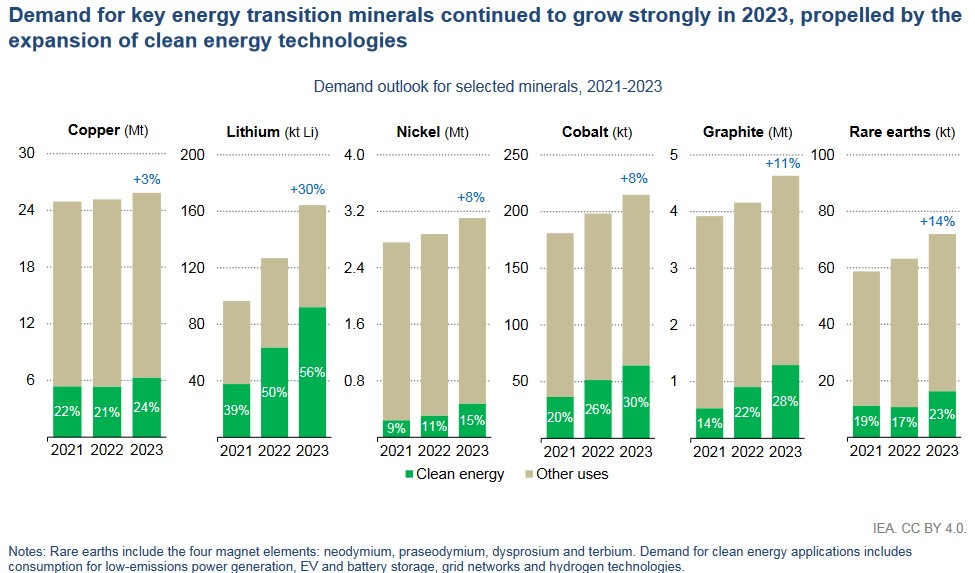
Demand for key energy transition minerals in 2023

== History and background ==
Analyzing the historical development of country approaches to critical materials, David Peck discusses the interplay between those that emphasize economic growth ("tech will fix it") and those that argue that finite resources will be exhausted ("limits to growth"). These two approaches are a feature of debate around critical materials and both are important, while countries also act in self-interest as well as responding to geopolitical tensions.

== Terminology ==
"Critical minerals" or "critical raw materials", often referred to as "CRMs", are raw materials designated by governments as critical for their economies. There is no single list of such materials, as the list varies from country to country, as does the definition of "critical", which varies with time and is context-specific. A general definition is:

…non-fuel materials that are considered essential to the modern economy – especially energy, defence, and technology – but whose supply is at risk due to their limited availability or geopolitical factors like where they're located or processed.

For advanced industrial economies the commonly used terms "critical minerals" or "critical raw materials" refer to materials required for their strategic industries where there is a risk of interruption to supply. The Minerals Security Partnership (MSP) is a transnational association whose members seek to secure a stable supply of raw materials for their economies. On 5 April 2024, MSP partners launched the Minerals Security Partnership Forum to enhance cooperation in respect of CRM critical to "green and digital transitions". On February 24, 2026, during the 2026 Critical Minerals Ministerial, the U.S. Department of State launched the Forum on Resource Geostrategic Engagement (FORGE) as the successor to the MSP. FORGE seeks strengthen diversified, resilient, and secure critical minerals supply chains.

== National and regional actions ==
=== United States ===
The United States 2023 Final Critical Materials List includes critical materials for energy (sometimes known as the "electric 18") (Note: Aluminum, cobalt, copper, dysprosium, electrical steel, fluorine, gallium, iridium, lithium, magnesium, natural graphite, neodymium, nickel, platinum, praseodymium, silicon, silicon carbide and terbium) together with 50 critical minerals. (Note: Aluminum, antimony, arsenic, barite, beryllium, bismuth, cerium, cesium, chromium, cobalt, dysprosium, erbium, europium, fluorspar, gadolinium, gallium, germanium, graphite, hafnium, holmium, indium, iridium, lanthanum, lithium, lutetium, magnesium, manganese, neodymium, nickel, niobium, palladium, platinum, praseodymium, rhodium, rubidium, ruthenium, samarium, scandium, tantalum, tellurium, terbium, thulium, tin, titanium, tungsten, vanadium, ytterbium, yttrium, zinc, and zirconium.) The 2025 Critical Mineral List included ten new minerals.

=== European Union ===
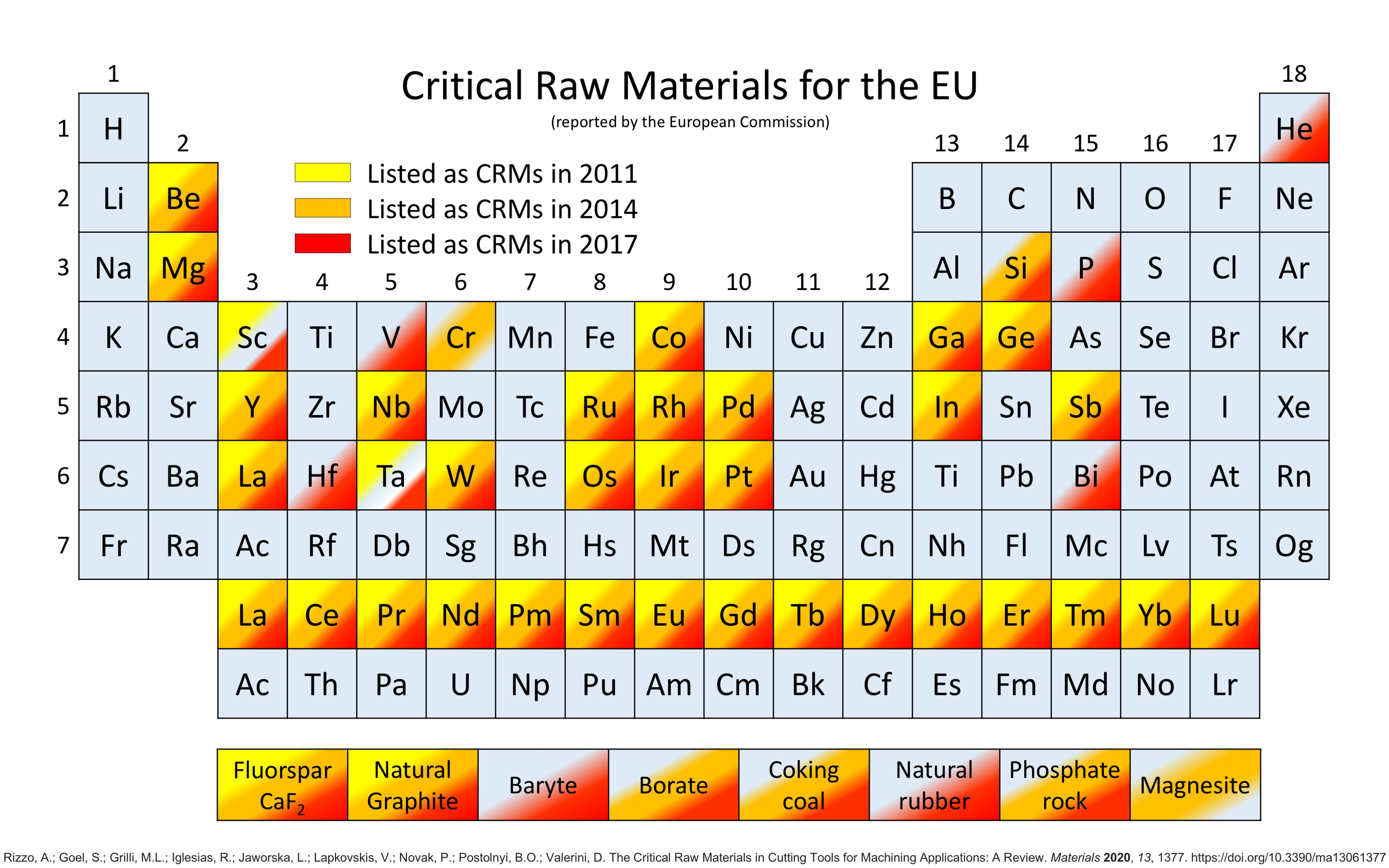
Figure gives a summary of CRMs lists reported by the European Commission in 2011, 2014, and 2017

Lists of CRMs were published by the European Commission in 2011, 2014, 2017, 2020, and 2023. The fifth list of 34 CRMs was published in Annex II of the Regulation proposal COM(2023). The Critical Raw Materials Act came into effect in the European Union on 23 May 2024. It specifies a list of 34 CRMs, including 17 raw materials (Note: Bauxite, Coking Coal, Lithium, Phosphorus, Antimony, Feldspar, Light rare earth elements, Scandium, Arsenic, Fluorspar, Magnesium, Silicon metal, Baryte, Gallium, Manganese, Strontium, Beryllium, Germanium, Natural Graphite, Tantalum, Bismuth, Hafnium, Niobium, Titanium metal, Boron/Borate, Helium, Platinum group metals, Tungsten, Cobalt, Heavy rare earth elements, Phosphate Rock, Vanadium, Copper, Nickel.) considered strategic. The EU is mostly dependent on imports for these minerals: 100% of its supply of heavy rare-earth elements (REEs) comes from China; 99% of its supply of boron from Turkey; and South Africa provides 71% of its needs for platinum and an even greater percentage of iridium, rhodium, and ruthenium. In contrast, 99.7% of the strontium consumed in the EU comes from Spain.

=== UK ===
The United Kingdom's Critical Minerals Strategy: Resilience for the Future was published in July 2022, and updated in March 2023. As of December 2024, the UK does not produce any of the 18 identified highly critical CRM (Note: Antimony, Bismuth, Cobalt, Gallium, Graphite, Indium, Lithium, Magnesium, Niobium, Palladium, Platinum, Rare Earth Elements, Silicon, Tantalum, Tellurium, Tin, Tungsten, Vanadium) while a watchlist of increasingly critical materials includes Iridium, Manganese, Nickel, Phosphates and Ruthenium.

In November 2024, the UK 2024 Criticality Assessment commissioned by the Department for Business and Trade, was published by the Critical Minerals Intelligence Centre, a unit of the British Geological Survey. The report identified 34 minerals as critical. Aluminium, chromium, germanium, iron, and nickel were added to the 2021 list, while palladium was removed. By fostering sustainable planning and design, the UK could reduce its demand for limited resources while supporting long-term economic resilience.

The National Engineering Policy Centre released a report into critical materials in the United Kingdom in 2024. It studied ways of reducing the UK's demand for critical materials, especially in infrastructure, through changes to planning, design, and end-of-life of technologies like electric vehicle batteries, wind turbines, and also digital devices. The report also warns that without strategic interventions to reduce critical material dependency, the UK risks jeopardising its net zero objectives and facing economic instability due to material shortages. It also outlines specific recommendations to reduce the UK’s use and consumption of critical materials.

=== India ===
In India, the development and governance of critical mineral resources fall under the purview of the Ministry of Mines, which is empowered under by the Mines and Minerals (Development and Regulation) Act, 1957, and the Offshore Areas Mineral (Development and Regulation) Act, 2002. These efforts have been supplemented by the National Critical Minerals Mission (NCMM) which was launched in 2025, and is to some extent supported by the National Policy on Geothermal Energy.

The Ministry of Mines has identified 30 critical minerals based on their economic significance and supply risk. The identification was done based on the criteria identified by the European Union. These minerals have been identified as essential for India's economic growth and national security. Many of these resources remain insufficiently explored or developed and the country remains reliant on imports of critical minerals, 75% of which is sourced from China.

=== China ===
On 30 November 2023, the Ministry of National Security of China defined critical minerals (Note: Aluminium, antimony, beryllium, boron, chrome, coal, cobalt, copper, fluorite, gallium, germanium, graphite, indium, iron, lithium, manganese, molybdenum, natural gas, nickel, niobium, petroleum, potassium, rare earths, rhenium, tantalum, tin, titanium, tungsten, uranium, vanadium and zirconium) as "those irreplaceable metal elements and mineral deposits used in advanced industries, such as new materials, new energy, next-generation information technology, artificial intelligence, biotechnology, edge-cutting equipment manufacturing, national defense, and military sectors".

=== Australia ===
The Australian Government's Critical Minerals Office published a Critical Minerals List and a Strategic Materials List in June 2023. This was updated on 20 February 2024, when nickel was added to the list. The list is updated every three years, and aims to support:

- transition to net-zero emissions
- advanced manufacturing
- defence technologies and capabilities
- broader strategic applications

The list includes 32 entries, (Note: All rare-earth elements, along with high-purity alumina, antimony, arsenic, beryllium, bismuth, chromium, cobalt, fluorine, gallium, germanium, graphite, hafnium, indium, lithium, magnesium, manganese, molybdenum, nickel, niobium, platinum-group elements, rhenium, scandium, selenium, silicon, tantalum, tellurium, titanium, tungsten, vanadium, and zirconium.) which include "platinum-group elements" and (all) "rare-earth elements". Australia has some resources for many of its CRMs. The government's Critical Minerals Strategic Reserve plan is due for publication at the end of 2026. The intention of this plan is to introduce mechanisms such as a price floor that bring stability to the market and reduce price volatility.

Its list of Strategic Materials include those important for the global transition to net-zero and wider strategic applications, for which Australia has geological potential for resources, and are in demand from strategic international partners. These materials, whose supply chains do not meet the criteria of vulnerability to be included on the CRM list, are: aluminium, copper, phosphorus, tin, and zinc.

Following the publication of its "Critical Minerals Strategy 2023–2030" in June 2023, in November 2024, the Albanese government announced its "International Partnerships in Critical Minerals" program, which will provide AU$40 million in grants across eight projects.

The government's Critical Minerals Strategic Reserve plan is due for publication at the end of 2026. The intention of this plan is to introduce mechanisms such as a price floor that bring stability to the market and reduce price volatility. The Strategic Reserve includes two new mechanisms:

- National Offtake Agreements, by which the government acquires agreed amounts of critical minerals from commercial suppliers, through voluntary contractual arrangements, or alternatively establish an option to purchase at a given price, securing these assets
- Selective stockpiling, by which certain key critical minerals, produced under offtake agreements, will be stockpiled.

=== New Zealand ===
In 2024 New Zealand Ministry of Business, Innovation and Employment released a list of 35 critical minerals (Note: Aggregate & sand, aluminium, antimony, arsenic, beryllium, bismuth, boron, cesium, chromium, cobalt, copper, fluorspar, gallium, germanium, graphite, indium, magnesium, manganese, molybdenum, nickel, niobium, phosphate, platinum group metals, potassium (potash), rare earth elements, rubidium, selenium, silicon, strontium, tellurium, titanium, tungsten, vanadium, zinc, zirconium) as part of its draft mining strategy. This was based on a Wood Mackenzie report in which the minerals were ranked by "supply risk score". All the minerals in the Wood Mackenzie list were present on at least one of the lists of Australia, the USA, the EU, Canada, or the UK, except for "aggregate and sand" needed for road construction, which had the lowest supply risk score, but was included because of the impracticality of New Zealand importing it. Gold and metallurgical coal were not considered critical minerals in the Wood Mackenzie report, but were later added because they represent a significant part of New Zealand's mineral exports. This made a final list of 37 critical minerals.

=== Other countries ===
India, Japan, and Korea have also produced lists of critical minerals.

=== OECD ===
A 2015 OECD working paper provides the first comprehensive analysis of critical minerals for the OECD as a whole, examining both current conditions and projections to 2030 in order to assess how long-term economic trends may affect mineral criticality. The analysis covers 51 minerals and evaluates supply risk using three indicators: substitutability, recycling rates, and the concentration of production in politically unstable countries. Physical scarcity is not considered a major short-term source of supply risk, as reserves are generally large and market mechanisms tend to mitigate depletion, though the report includes a forward-looking indicator of reserve exhaustion up to 2030.

Supply risks for OECD as a whole are instead primarily linked to production concentration and geopolitical factors. Economic vulnerability is assessed by examining the use of each mineral across sectors and the economic importance of those sectors. The analysis identifies between 12 and 20 minerals or mineral groups as critical for the OECD today, with rare earth elements, germanium, and natural graphite exhibiting particularly high supply risks, and barytes, tungsten, and vanadium being especially economically important. By 2030, increased reliance on physical reserve availability is projected to raise supply risks for minerals such as barytes, borates, phosphate rock, and molybdenum, while the overall pattern of economic importance remains broadly unchanged under a fossil-fuel-based growth scenario. The report also evaluates how improvements in substitutability and recycling could reduce future supply risks, highlighting mineral-specific priorities for public support to research and development.

== Geopolitical risk ==
There is an increased focus on supply chains in general and for critical materials specifically, highlighted by US-China competition. China is the biggest producer of 30 of the US 50 critical minerals as well as being a significant player in downstream processing and manufacture. Following US restrictions on the Chinese semiconductor industry, China, on 3 December 2024, for the first time imposed export restrictions targeted at the United States only rather than all countries, covering antimony, gallium, and germanium.

China has less than 1 per cent of the world's zirconium, a critical mineral which is essential for making hypersonic missiles as well as the development of nuclear power. Australia, the largest producer of zirconium, exports much of it to China, supplying the country with 41 per cent of its total imports of it. Since the Russian invasion of Ukraine, China has increased its export of the mineral to Russia.

A 2024 analysis from the World Economic Forum states that potential scarcity of critical materials arising from the energy transition will be driven by demand factors and suggests ways for governments to address the uncertainties involved.

== International agreements ==
On 21 October 2025, US president Donald Trump signed a deal with Australian prime minister Anthony Albanese, over rare-earths and other critical minerals that are needed for commercial clean energy production and technologically advanced military hardware. They each committed to provide at least US$1bn (A$1.54bn) towards a number of projects worth $US8.5bn (A$13bn) in both countries over six months. The deal is important to the US because rare earths are used in many technologies, including components of the Defense Force such as F-35 fighter jets and Tomahawk missiles. The deal is also seen as a major shift in economic alliances. In March 2026 Chile signed an agreement with the United States with regards to the exploitation and commercialization of rare-earths. This move has been interpreted by analysts an attempt by the United States to diminish Chinese influence in the rare-earths market.

The UK and US signed a Memorandum of Understanding on critical minerals in February 2026, aiming to address supply chain concerns affecting CRMs and to protect employment in critical mineral industries.

== See also ==
- Circular economy
- Conflict resource

== Bibliography ==
- S. Erik Offerman, ed. (2018). Critical materials: underlying causes and sustainable mitigation strategies. World Scientific Publishing Co. Pte. Ltd. ISBN 9789813271043.
- Dr. Arda Işıldar & Dr. Eric D. van Hullebusch, ed. (2024). Critical Materials and Sustainability Transition. CRC Press/Balkema. ISBN 978-1-003-21892-0.
