= Technology-critical element =

Chemical element critical to modern and emerging technologies

A technology-critical element (TCE) is a chemical element that is a critical raw material for modern and emerging technologies, resulting in a striking increase in their usage. Similar terms include critical elements, critical materials, energy-critical elements and elements of security.

Many advanced engineering applications, such as clean-energy production, communications and computing, use emergent technologies that utilize numerous chemical elements. In 2013, the U.S. Department of Energy (DOE) created the Critical Materials Institute to address the issue. In 2015, the European COST Action TD1407 created a network of scientists working and interested in TCEs, from an environmental perspective to potential human health threats.

A study estimated losses of 61 metals to help the development of circular economy strategies, showing that usespans of, often scarce, tech-critical metals are short.

== List of technology-critical elements ==
The set of elements usually considered as TCEs vary depending on the source, but they usually include:

Seventeen rare-earth elements

- cerium
- dysprosium
- erbium
- europium
- gadolinium
- holmium
- lanthanum
- lutetium
- neodymium
- praseodymium
- promethium
- samarium
- scandium
- terbium
- thulium
- ytterbium
- yttrium

The six platinum-group elements

- iridium
- osmium
- palladium
- platinum
- rhodium
- ruthenium

Twelve assorted elements

- antimony
- beryllium
- caesium
- cobalt
- gallium
- germanium
- indium
- lithium
- niobium
- tantalum
- tellurium
- tungsten

Elements such as oxygen, silicon, and aluminum (among others) are also vital for electronics, but are not included in these lists due to their widespread abundance.

== Applications of technology-critical elements ==
TCEs have a variety of engineering applications in fields such as energy storage, electronics, telecommunication, and transportation. These elements are utilized in cellular phones, batteries, solar panel(s), electric motor(s), and fiber-optic cables. Emerging technologies also incorporate TCEs. Most notably, TCEs are used in the data networking of smart devices tied to the Internet of Things (IoT) and automation.

Sample uses of technology-critical elements (excluding rare-earth)
Element	Compound	Applications
Gallium (Ga)	GaAs, GaN	Wafers for (a) integrated circuits in high-performance computers and telecommunications equipment and (b) LEDs, photodetectors, solar cells and medical equipment
Gallium (Ga)	Trimethyl Ga, triethyl Ga	Epitaxial layering process for the production of LEDs
Germanium (Ge)	Ge	Substrate for wafers for high-efficiency photovoltaic cells
Germanium (Ge)	Ge single crystals	Detectors (airport security)
Hafnium (Hf)	Hf	Aerospace alloys and ceramics
Hafnium (Hf)	HfO2	Semiconductors and data storage devices
Indium (In)	In2O5Sn	Transparent conductive thin film coatings on flat-panel displays (e.g. liquid crystal displays)
Niobium (Nb)	CuNbGaSe (CIGS)	Thin film solar cells
Niobium (Nb)	HSLA ferro-Nb (60 % Nb), Nb metal	High-grade structural steel for vehicle bodies
Niobium (Nb)	NiNb	Superalloys for jet engines and turbine blades
Niobium (Nb)	Nb powder, Nb oxide	Surface acoustic wave filters (sensor and touch screen technologies)
Platinum-group metals (PGMs)	Pd, Pt, Rh metals	Catalytic converters for the car industry
Platinum (Pt)	Pt metal	Catalyst refining of petroleum and magnetic coating of computer hard discs
Iridium (Ir)	Ir	Crucibles for the electronics industry
Osmium (Os)	Os alloys	High wear applications such as instrument pivots and electrical contacts
Tantalum (Ta)	Ta oxide	Capacitors in automotive electronics, personal computers and cell phones
Tantalum (Ta)	Ta metal	Pacemakers, prosthetic devices
Tellurium (Te)	CdTe	Solar cells
Tellurium (Te)	HgCdTe, BiTe	Thermal cooling devices and electronics products
Zirconium (Zr)	Zr	Ceramics for solid oxide fuel cells, jet turbine coatings, and smartphones

== Environmental considerations ==
The extraction and processing of TCEs may cause adverse environmental impacts. The reliance on TCEs and critical metals like cobalt can run the risk of the “green curse,” or using certain metals in green technologies whose mining may be damaging to the environment.

The clearing of soil and deforestation that is involved with mining can impact the surrounding biodiversity through land degradation and habitat loss. Acid mine drainage can kill surrounding aquatic life and harm ecosystems. Mining activities and leaching of TCEs can pose significant hazards to human health. Wastewater produced by the processing of TCEs can contaminate groundwater and streams. Toxic dust containing concentrations of metals and other chemicals can be released into the air and surrounding bodies of water.

Deforestation caused by mining results in the release of stored carbon from the ground to the atmosphere in the form of carbon dioxide (CO_{2}).

== See also ==
- Conflict resource
- List of elements facing shortage
- Rare-earth element
- Strategic material
- Renewable energy#Conservation areas, recycling and rare-earth elements
