= Arafura Rare Earths =

Australian mining company

- Type: Public
- Traded as: ASX: ARU
- Industry: Mining
- Headquarters: Perth, Western Australia
- Area served: Australia
- Key people: Darryl Cuzzubbo (CEO)
- Products: Rare-earth metals
- Website: www.arultd.com

Arafura Rare Earths Ltd, formerly Arafura Resources, is an Australian mining company headquartered in Perth, Western Australia. Its flagship project is the Nolans Rare Earths Project, located in Central Australia, which is dedicated to mining and production of rare-earth elements.

== History ==
Arafura Resources was listed on the Australian Stock Exchange in 2003. The company was renamed Arafura Rare Earths Ltd in October 2022.

== Description and operations ==
Arafura Rare Earths has its headquarters in Perth, Western Australia. As of May 2026, Darryl Cuzzubbo is CEO of the company.

The Australian Government as well as mining magnate Gina Rinehart have invested heavily in the project.

== Nolans Project ==
The company's flagship project is the Nolans Rare Earths Project (also known as the Nolans Bore Rare Earths Project), 135 km (84 mi) north of Alice Springs in the Northern Territory. As of 2025 the mine and refinery are still under development, having received support from the Australian Government in the form of an AU$840 million loan and grants package in 2024. In January 2025, the project received a further AU$200m of funding from the government.

The Nolans Bore rare-earths-phosphate-uranium-thorium (REE-P-U-Th) deposit is its main asset, being one of the largest and most intensively explored deposits of its type globally. It will include a mine and processing plant, along with related infrastructure, at the site, making it the first "ore-to-oxide" rare earths facility in Australia.

The project is particularly focused on neodymium and praseodymium (NdPr), which are crucial for technologies such as EVs and wind turbines. Arafura intends to become a leading global supplier of NdPr oxide, with the site being one of the world's largest undeveloped sources of these rare-earth elements. The project will be the first Australian fully-integrated mining and rare-earth separation project, and may potentially supply up to 4% of the world's magnet rare earths.

With an initial mine life of 38 years and a valuable phosphoric acid by-product, Nolans is intended to be a long-life, low-cost operation producing NdPr oxide. The project was given the go-ahead to begin construction of the mine by the Albanese government in May 2026. The government will buy up to 500 tonnes of NdPr oxide per year using funds from its Critical Minerals Strategic Reserve, and Arafura also has contracts to supply several international companies, including Hyundai, Kia, Siemens Gamesa and Traxys, an American commodities trading company.
