= Seabed mining =

Extracting minerals from the seabed

Model of seabed mining technology

Seabed mining, also known as seafloor mining, is the recovery of minerals from the seabed by techniques of underwater mining. The concept includes mining at shallow depths on the continental shelf and deep-sea mining at greater depths associated with tectonic activity, hydrothermal vents and the abyssal plains. The increased requirement for minerals and metals used in the technology sector has led to a renewed interest in the mining of seabed mineral resources, including massive polymetallic sulfide deposits around hydrothermal vents, cobalt-rich crusts on the sides of seamounts and fields of manganese nodules on the abyssal plains. While the seabed provides a high concentration of valuable minerals, there is an unknown risk of ecological damage on marine species because of a lack of data.

== Resources ==
The varied geological and biological processes occurring in the ocean produce economically viable concentrations of a range of minerals, notably in the vicinity of hydrothermal vents, where highly concentrated fluids precipitate out their solutes on cooling. The technical and economic problems of extraction have not been overcome for most deposits. There have been some viable underwater mining operations, notably the recovery of diamonds off the west coast of southern Africa.

Deposits of diamonds, iron sands with titanomagnetite and lime-soda feldspars, cobalt-rich manganese crusts, phosphorite nodules and manganese nodules are already known. The value and scarcity of rare earth elements is encouraging investigation into mining them from seabed deposits. There is also potential to extract methane from gas hydrates in marine sediment on continental slopes and rises.

Large quantities of gas hydrates are potentially available, as 1 m^{3} methane hydrate can yield 164 m^{3} of methane gas. However, the process is technologically complex and costly, so commercial exploitation has not yet started. Estimates of the global mass of marine methane hydrates range from about 550 to 1,146 Gt C. Reserves of gas hydrates are widely distributed in the sediment of continental slopes and rises and on land beneath polar permafrost, with an estimated 95% in continental margin deposits.

Manganese Nodules are found on the abyssal plains of the seafloor which contain a variety of useable metals including copper, cobalt and nickel which are in high demand to produce technology. These metals are highly sought after for the production of batteries, smartphones, electric cars, solar and wind turbines and the storage of green electricity. An electric car alone requires five to ten kilograms of cobalt. The size of manganese nodules are 1 centimetre to 10 centimetres, differing in shape and surface, depending on the environment.

== Projects ==
On the Namibian west coast of southern Africa, Diamond Fields International Ltd started shallow seabed mining for diamonds in 2001. The De Beers Group continues to use specialized ships to recover diamonds from the seabed. They extracted 1.4 million carats from the exclusive economic zone (EEZ) of Namibia in 2018. In 2019, De Beers commissioned a new ship which is expected to improve productivity by a factor of two.

The Papua New Guinea (PNG) government granted an 'exploration' license to Nautilus Minerals Ltd. (Nautilus) for the 'Solwara 1' project in January 2011. It was the first exploration license for the deep sea. Whilst the project did not go ahead due to Nautilus declaring bankruptcy, the project provided a basis for how legal framework might develop. The lease covered an area of 59 square kilometres to a depth of 1,600 meters in the Bismarck Sea to extract essential resources for a period of 20 years. Nautilus sought to extract a total of 1.3 tons of materials, including 80,000 tons of high-grade copper and 150,000 to 200,000 ounces of gold sulphide ore over the course of 3 years. Considering that the PNG economy heavily relies on mining, PNG had a strong interest in the success of Solwara 1and purchased a 30% stake, later costing them over $120 million (USD) in losses. There was widespread opposition to the licensing mostly due to the lack of compensation to any local citizens and indigenous peoples for potential damages that the mining might cause.

== Technology ==
Seabed mining proposals are all based on the similar concept of a seabed resource collector, a lifting system and surface vessels which may process the material offshore or transport ores to land based facilities. Most of the proposed collection systems would use remotely operated vehicles, which would remove deposits from the seabed using mechanical devices or pressurized water jets. Robotic excavation machinery were built to work on deposits in the Solwara 1 Project. This included a bulk cutter to break up the surface rock, a collecting machine to act like a suction dredger by pumping the fragments to the lift pump. This would transfer the material to a ship at the surface which would transport the material to a site to be processed. These are massive machines which maneuver around the seabed on caterpillar tracks. Minerals which concentrate in the seafloor deposits can be rich in metals such as copper, gold, silver, and zinc but need to be broken up for extraction and transport. Natural gas would be extracted from reservoirs of gas hydrate by injecting chemical inhibitors, depressurising the reservoir, or increasing the temperature.

== Impact ==
=== Positive ===
There is potential for positive economic impact for the mining industries involved, the industries that need the available minerals, and for the countries with EEZ's in which the deposits are located.

Seabed mining has been advocated as an alternative to land-based mining. Land-based mining is known to have a destructive impact through contribution to toxic wastewater, soil contamination and deforestation. In China and Indonesia the waste from lithium, graphite and silicon destroyed villages and ecosystems. There has also been major acid mine drainage issues in America. Land-based mining also produces over 350 billion tonnes of waste and has a major carbon footprint. It accounts for 11% of global energy, compared to an estimated 1% in seabed mining. Tens of thousands of square kilometers of forests are cleared for land-based mining, with it expected to increase, furthering habitat destruction and biodiversity loss. Some studies have shown that the deep sea has the lowest biomass environments on the planet. The Clarion Clipperton Zone has 300 times less biomass than average biome on land and up to 3000 times less compared to rainforest regions where most land mines are located. The life that does exist is 70% bacteria, and most organisms are smaller than 4 cm. Ultimately there is still inadequate data to confirm these studies.

The deep sea especially provides minerals in high demand for new green technology. This cannot be met by current recycling schemes and to keep up with intensified demand, production of these minerals would need to increase by nearly 500% by 2050. The deep sea is much more economical than land based sources as metal ores on land yield below 20%, often using less than 2%, whilst seabed nodules are 99% usable minerals.

There is also a reduced social cost to the nations with seabed deposits compared to nations with land-based mines, as sea bed mining has little cost on human life due to its distance from land hazards. Land mines have a large association with deaths and injuries and the financial cost of these. Land mining is the second-most harmful industry to human health, with estimated nearly 7 million people at risk from the toxic waste land mining produces and a death toll of more than 15,000 miners every year. There is a range of financial cost depending on a nation's valuation of the cost of human life. For example, in South Africa, 143 deaths in two years of mining cost $150 million. Often, vulnerable populations are more affected as workers are typically underprivileged people or children in developing countries. Half of cobalt supplies come from inhumane child labour practises and the predicted intensification in the land-based extraction of metals could exacerbate human rights abuses. There is also issues with the practise of building mines on indigenous lands, but indigenous inhabitants often do not have the resources to fight big companies. Seabed mining as an alternative source causes no cultural disruption. Mining companies have also offered 'benefit sharing' to the nations who provide them with contracts to mine within their EEZ. This can include the provision of employment and training, infrastructure development, direct community investment and payments to the government as compensation to the local communities. Infrastructure development could provide access to electricity and clean water or development of roads, schools, and hospitals. The practise of redistributing benefits is up to the discretion of the companies and nations involved in the projects as there are currently no guidelines.

=== Negative ===
There is also the potential for severe environmental impact to sensitive and unique ecosystems through seabed disturbance and deposits of disturbed material on downstream regions. Interest in mining possibilities is providing impetus for scientific study of the deposits and the mechanisms of their formation. Biologists are concerned about the little known communities of exotic life forms which could be destroyed before they are studied. There is still insufficient research to make predictions with confidence.

Although seabed mining is promoted as a source of materials for green technologies, environmentally concerned individuals and organizations argue that recycling and alternative sourcing tactics should be prioritized over seabed mining due to the potential harm and pollution to the oceans and wildlife.

In the case of deposits around hydrothermal vents, each vent discharges a unique mix of solutes and therefore each vent is colonized by a different combination of life forms. Researchers are still finding new species, but a common feature of the vents is that their ecosystems thrive in conditions that would be highly hostile to most other life. The study of these species could provide insights into the evolution of terrestrial life. There are also concerns about the safety of the systems planned for mineral recovery, and the possible impact of accidents involving such equipment on the local and wider environment.

The extraction of manganese nodules in the deep sea involve large truck sized vehicles on the seabed which can potentially destroy up to a depth of 3 km on the seafloor, with the plow tracks still visible decades later. Some studies have suggested that the microbiology would need over 50 years to return to their undisturbed initial state. Contracts to explore for manganese nodules are typically only for areas up to 75,000 km^{2}, but the total area affected is estimated to be between 200 and 600 km^{2} impacting a much larger marine ecosystem. These mining vehicles emit plumes of sediment which would transport sediment to a greater distance from the site. The seabed also has a much slower recovery potential as nodules only grow few tens of millimeters per million years. Epifauna is the wildlife that depends on the nodules and the habitat they produce through their substrate. Following the mining of the nodules, the substrate on the nodules will not return for millions of years until new nodules are formed. These rare and slow to reproduce epifauna would face extinction from the habitat removal involved in mining nodules. The organisms living on the seabed can also be affected by the noise and light pollution made by the mining technology or could be dispersed or smothered in the sediment of the plumes.

Ultimately, the remoteness and complexity of the seabed make it difficult for scholars to obtain definitive research results.

== Legal aspects ==
The International Seabed Authority is a body of the United Nations which was established in 1982 to regulate human activities on the deep-sea floor beyond the continental shelf. It continues to develop rules for commercial mining, and as of 2016, has issued 27 contracts for mineral exploration, covering a total area of more than 1.4 million km^{2}. Other seabed mining operations are already proceeding within the EEZ's of nation states, usually at relatively shallow depths on the continental shelf.

The jurisdiction governing human activity in the ocean is zoned by distance from land. A coastal state's has full jurisdiction over 12 nautical miles (22 km) of territorial sea, in accordance with the 1982 United Nations Convention on the Law of the Sea (UNCLOS), which includes the air space, the water column and the subsoil. Coastal states also have exclusive rights and jurisdiction over the resources within their 200 nautical miles (370 km) EEZ. Some states also have sovereign rights over the seabed and any mineral resources over an extended continental shelf beyond the EEZ. Further offshore is the area beyond national jurisdiction, which covers both the seabed and the water column above it. UNCLOS designates this region as the common heritage of mankind. UNCLOS provides the legal framework, whilst regulation and control of mineral-related activities are the responsibility of the International Seabed Authority. UNCLOS Article 136 covers the common heritage of mankind, Article 137 covers the resources within the common area and Article 145 covers the protection of the marine environment in areas beyond national jurisdiction.

=== Nauru Case ===
In June 2021, the president of Nauru stressed the urgency of finalizing regulations for mining in international waters to the council of the International Seabed Authority.

The International Seabed Authority has been working on the Mining Code, regulations governing commercial mining of the deep seafloor, since 2014 and was scheduled to publish them in 2020. Nauru's request triggered a "2-year rule" which compelled the authority to have finalised the rules by July 2023 or accept applications for exploitation in the absence of formal guidelines. The rules still had not been finalised, but the ISA council agreed to attempt to complete a set of formal rules by 2025. The Metals Company who is seeking to mine in Nauru agreed to not submit another mining application until July 2024, allowing the ISA four more sessions to work on regulation. The case has led to at least 21 nations along with activists to call for a moratorium until more research is completed. France is the only nation to call for a ban on deep sea mining whilst the UK, Norway and China have pushed for deep sea mining. The US have also introduced bills calling for a moratorium in both their own EEZ and international waters. The continual lack of regulation means questions surrounding the long-term effects of seabed mining remain unresolved. On April 2, 2025 Portugal has become the first country in the world to effectively impose a moratorium in both its own EEZ and international waters until 2050.

=== United States interest ===
On April 24, 2025, President Trump issued Executive Order 14285, "Unleashing America's Offshore Critical Minerals and Resources," which directed certain federal agencies, including the National Oceanic and Atmospheric Administration (NOAA), to advance seabed mining activities.

On April 29, 2025, The Metals Company's U.S. subsidiary (TMC USA) submitted applications to NOAA for two exploration licenses and one commercial recovery permit under the Deep Seabed Hard Mineral Resources Act. In June 2025, TMC USA amended its exploration applications. NOAA determined that these applications were "fully compliant" with DSHMRA requirements. TMC USA's two exploration license applications (A and B) overlap with portions of TMC's Nauru and Tonga ISA exploration contract areas in the CCZ. To date, NOAA has not made a determination on TMC USA's commercial recovery permit application. The information relevant to the application is to be made public when NOAA publishes its notice in the Federal Register (15 C.F.R. §971.212).

On January 21, 2026, NOAA issued a final rule that revised its seabed mining regulations to include a "consolidated license and permit application process in which applicants could meet both exploration license requirements, to establish priority of right, and permit requirements simultaneously" (91 FR 2642). The final rule is reflected in 15 CFR 971.214. On January 22, 2026, TMC USA submitted a consolidated application to NOAA. Reportedly, another U.S. company, Deep Sea Rare Minerals (DSRM), plans to submit a consolidated application to NOAA in 2026. DSRM announced in November 2025 that it had submitted an exploration application to NOAA; reportedly, NOAA determined the application to be in substantial compliance with DSHMRA requirements.
