= Deepsea mining in Namibia =

Deep sea mining in Namibia

Deep sea mining

Namibia is one of the first countries that issued mining licences regarding deep sea mining. Studies that took place in 1970s discovered considerable amounts of phosphate deposits. The significance of seabed mining in Namibia's blue economy is highlighted by the country's status as a "phosphate factory". This is due to the exceptional upwellings of the Benguela Current ecosystem, a transboundary ocean current that spans from South Africa in the south to Angola in the north, passing through Namibia. Those deposits were found in depths between 180 and 300 meters below the sea level. In 2011 the Namibian government issued licences regarding the exploitation of the seabed phosphate resources after the necessary Environmental Impact Assessments (EIAs). The action plan that stood out was that of Namibian Marine Phosphates (NMP), a joint venture formed in 2008 between two Australian-based companies, Minemakers and Union Resources (each with 42.5% shareholding) and Namibian-based Tungeni Investments (15% shareholding). The so-called Sandpiper phosphate mining project outlay was introduced in January 2012 along with environmental reports regarding the effect this operation would have on marine life as well as the fishing industry and water quality changes. Those phosphorite resources are being found in continental shelves and slopes in America, Northern Spain, Morocco, Namibia, and South Africa which show a high potential for exploration.

The urge of exploring and exploiting deep sea mineral resources has come from the demand and the shortage of phosphate on the markets. Specifically, fertilizers, which are a market that is heavily dependent on phosphate resources, has seen its prices skyrocket due to this shortage. This demand tied with the quality and density of the deep-sea resources in Namibia's seabed has made the willingness of resource exploitation in the area even more prominent. Furthermore, the resources in Namibia waters are very close to the potential markets that are interested in acquiring those metals which will diminish transportation costs adding another dimension on why exploiting those resources is critical for the markets. Additionally when the excavation technology is finished the ships and the tools used for extraction will be mobile and they can travel to various areas that were deemed rich in minerals. This mobility will be a revelation in mining in comparison to the immobility of land mining.

== Namibia's phosphate resources ==
Namibia

Namibia's shelf contains different phosphate resources such as Diagenetic phosphorite, which originated by phosphitylation of carbonate rocks and biogenic debris, forms a 0.5 m thick pavement across large parts of the shelf off the southern tip of Africa. This phosphorites can be found on the seabed as pebbles, and gravel-sized, irregular fragments, which originally consisted of foraminiferal limestone, glauconitic, or limonitic sandstone. The age of phosphitylation varies from the earliest Miocene to the Quaternary. Although there is a variety of phosphate minerals in Namibia the most common one is found in sand form pellets on the organic rich muds of the seabed. Those pellets can be found as a continuous layer in the Namibian waters at approximately 180 to 300 meters below the sea level. In the Namibia's case the formation consists of two layers. The first layer which is closer to the seabed surface has a thickness of 0.1–1.0 m and consists of coarse molluscan shell debris embedded in a dark brown matrix of fine-sandy phosphoric pellets. The shell fragments decrease in size and abundance with depth and the pellets while the mud content increase. The second layer is found as ions in Miocene clays. Those are thicker than the surface ones and their history and reasons of existence are still poorly understood.

=== Other resources ===
Apart from phosphate resources Namibia seabed is filled with rare earth elements were the ocean environment has kept and preserved minerals such as copper, nickel, manganese and other in very big sizes and higher grade quality than most of the earth resources. As mentioned above there are a number of companies that seem willing to invest in researching and exploiting the deep sea in the Clarion-Clipperton Zone (CCZ). Although the gains of exploiting the deep sea bed of Namibia may be incredible, it is not yet clear how efficient the mining technology in such depth would be. With deep mining technology being in the works companies although noticing the huge potential there is not any engages in the CCZ zone. One company that is interested and has already carried out in areas associated with deep sea mining is Nautilus Minerals. Nautilus minerals has also been involved in explorations of deep sea in Papua New Guinea and Tonga and they primary mining focus are copper and gold. Those explorations for the potential mining process uses proven technologies of offshore gas extraction establishments. Despite their willingness to engage in extraction process the company issued protection from their creditors due to losses and expenses that reached 461 million dollars. Another example of a company looking to exploit resources from Namibia is DeepGreen metals with its primary focus being polymetallic nodules mining. The particular company plan is set to design an excavation plan that produces no tailings. While DeepGreen has already commenced their explorations which produced an estimation that minerals in Namibia's waters are ranging from 1 to 20 cm in diameter and they are found in depths of 4 to 5 thousand meters below sea level, they do not have a sufficient technology in order to proceed to excavation in the CCZ.

== The Sandpiper Project ==
The Sandpiper project was developed by Namibia Marine Phosphate as a phosphate resource mining project on shallow waters that is not considered deep sea. This project acts as predecessor to the direction where deep sea mining can occur in Namibia. With this project NMP received an exploration licence in 2006 for a radius of 100 kilometres while also receiving a licence for mining purposes . The sandpiper project explored 1500 cites. The depth of those sites are starting from 200 meters to kilometres and the discovery showed that the richest environment were found at around 220 meters where the first mining targets are. The planned mining system for polymetallic nodules would consist of a remotely operated nodule collector, a mining support vessel, a riser and lifting system, and a waste-water recirculation system connected to the mining platform for the discharge of sediment, discharge water, and erode nodule material. There are several options for the best available practice for nodule extraction, and in the most basic case, nodules and the semi-liquid layer of sediment collected from the seafloor are lifted on board a mining support vessel by a hydraulic transport pump system. Nodules can also be extracted by a collector that sieves the upper layers of sediment, separating nodules from sediment and redepositing it on the seafloor. The extraction of metal concretions may be considered a dredging operation, with similarities to aggregate extraction, but with the affected habitat being a combination of soft and hard substrates.

As of 2021 the International Seabed Authority (ISA) plans to develop a regulatory framework about potential mining in deep seas. There is a common understanding that the little knowledge existing for deep sea mining as most of the sea has not been explored and the deep sea exploitation consequences remain immeasurable regarding factors as biodiversity and climate. Aligning with this Windhoek High Court Judge Harald Geier issued that the NMP does not have environmental clearance and therefore cannot pursue any mining aspirations.

== Environmental issues ==
Although deep sea mining can be a revelation in resource markets the potential environmental damages cannot be ignored. Namibia as a nation heavily depended on the marine environment is no exception to that. The Sandpiper project takes places in the oxygen minimum zone which is fully developed under the coastal upwelling zone with its associated with intense biological production. In those specific conditions there is there is specific fauna such as annelid worms and crustaceans which has adopted those certain environmental characteristics. Environmental consequences by deep sea mining in the Namibian marine environment might be the loss of benthic fauna where the mining occur disturbance of the pelagic ecology from modifications of the water column by the settling of fine-grained particles and dissolved elements from the excess slurry water. The environmental studies that are being used by the mining companies state that the seabed disturbance will be sporadic and that the area where the mining occurs will be habitable once again when the disturbance stops. In this way the fishing industry in Namibia will not be impacted.

Uncertainty on what lies on the unexplored deep sea also creates stress in the environmental discussions. There is the danger that ocean species might have their environment destroyed before even knowing of their existence, The deep seabed mineral extraction means that metals and minerals that will be picked up from the area won't be reproduced again for millions of years which create uncertainties on how this will affect the Namibian seabed. A study from the University of Hamburg showed that the raking of the seabed caused sediment to cover vast tracts and created 'impacts... [that] reached further than anyone had imagined', according to Nature magazine. Another aspect of the problems that this uncertainty creates it is that any attempt in deep sea mining should be considered counter productive because of activities that might be useful to mankind in the future such as carbon burial.

== Consequences in the fishing industry ==
Namibia's plan to mine in the deep sea has been met with opposition from various groups, including civil society, the fishing industry, and government representatives. Fishing is a crucial source of income in Namibia, but overfishing due to colonialism has led to a depletion of fish stocks. The mining project could further threaten fishermen's quotas, as the extraction process could impact the mobility of fish.

While the argument that the impact of deep sea mining would not be considerable, local fisheries disagree. The fisheries are stating that the mining extractions will not only cause disturbance but they will also create a toxic environments and oxygen depletion. Also in their comments it is stated that the effects that the disturbances will have in not yet understood and the seasonal variability of the marine environment where the extraction will happen is not represented in the studies conducted. Also in general there are studies that associated environmental damage with deep sea mining extractions. Specifically, Mining manganese nodules may have an impact on the environment, as the collector is likely to destroy bottom-dwelling communities, and may bring increased noise levels, as well as anthropogenic lights, ultimately affecting the fauna. Also studies has shown that after reproducing an intense mining operation on the sea-floor, the researchers found that the ecosystem would not have recovered from the effects of the mining even after more than 20 years something that completely negates the studies introduced by NMP.

Fishing is one of the most important sectors financially and as it generates employment for communities in the Erongo Region. The scepticism of the fishing industry tracks back to the pre-independence days where Namibia's fishing was subject to overexploitation from the colonialist power which led to the depletion of fish stocks. With the past still affecting fisheries, Namibia implemented policies for fishing to pass on the hands of Namibians in a way that would create jobs and income for the state. Today fisheries are considered an integral part of Namibia and deep sea mining poses as a great threat. The economic potential of phosphate mining has shifted the paradigm of fisheries as the monopoly of the sea and created more actors with financial motives and different agendas. This contestation between fishing and mining has raised problems in property relations on the sea. The mining can destroy the mobility of fish and create irregularities on the fish stocks a thing that makes difficult the coexistence of mining and fishing. The fishing industry has been the traditional power which has the upper hand political debates has been asking for independent environmental assessments and not EIAs issued by mining companies which was previously issued.

== Moratorium on marine phosphate mining ==
The NMP's Sandpiper project has met with substantial criticism from various organisations (Earth Organisation Namibia, Deep Sea Mining Campaign, Swartkopmund Matters) were against the grand of exploration and mining purposes due to the danger that mining could have to the benthic fauna, release of heavy metals and the impact on fishing. The fishing industry has issued for a moratorium though the Ministry of fisheries which led into an 18-month moratorium in 2013. Furthermore, the calls of the fishing industry were granted by the Namibian government which issued a broader and independent Environmental Impact Assessment though the Norwegian-based Foundation for Scientific and Industrial Research (SINTEF) and the Institute for Marine Research, after the expiry of the Moratorium the Namibian's government decision was for the moratorium to continue for 3 years with an extension to be deemed possible.

== Social implications ==
=== Colonialist history of exploitation ===
Namibia's history of managing its resources has been influenced by its struggle for control over them as a newly independent nation that had entered a post colonial state. One area where it has asserted its control is in deep sea mining. National sovereignty over resources in Namibia developed as a response to colonisers' attempts to measure and exploit its territory and resources, such as Germany's extraction of marine species using contract migrant labour.

The issues that Namibia are facing due to their colonialist past are also linked to already existing diamond mining. Companies such as De Beers contributed to the suspicious approach on foreign exploitation by the people of Namibia. Their extraction which involve copper and diamonds in the area has woken the colonialist past and has created tensions and conflicts in the African continent. The pressing demand for resources often dehumanizeσ the process of retrieving those metals with companies draining the resources without accounting for the people that need to continue living without those jobs while the quality of their environment is destroyed by the aggressive exploitation and mining in those areas.

With land and ocean grabbing being huge problems for Namibia's financial stability the country started prioritising its own interests and control over its resources. However, Namibia still relies on donors and grants, and its current financial crisis has led it to seek alternative sources of income. To address these challenges, Namibia has developed the National Development Plan 5 (NDP5), which emphasises the blue economy as a way to promote sustainable and equitable growth by harmonising various sectors, including marine mining. As the landlord of the area, the Namibian government can grant licenses for fishing and mining. However, this has led to competition between different capital factions vying for a share of the blue economy. While the government has sovereignty over the Exclusive Economic Zone, this legal designation does not account for the physical and socioeconomic complexities of the marine environment.

=== Regulatory difficulties ===
The regulatory process of deep sea mining is very complicated for the actors and Namibia is not an exception to that. Although Namibia possesses the power to act as a landlord inside its borders the regulation of a place that fluid and interconnected such as the sea will raise disagreements between various actors. The perception of the seabed regarding the regulatory and legislative policy making remains vague and in a state that its hard to establish a common framework.. In case of Namibia this vague perception introduces problem because of the environmental consequences that any deep sea mining project would have. The Benguela Current in case the mining starts will transport sand and particles caused by the disturbance from the mining project which will affect the environment and fishing to neighbouring countries such as Angola and South Africa

== See also ==
- Deep sea mining
