= Sandpiper (disambiguation) =

Sandpipers are a group of birds.

Sandpiper may also refer to:

== Music ==
- The Sandpipers, a singing group of the 1960s and '70s
  - The Sandpipers (album), a 1967 album by this group

== Other ==
- Atlantic City Sandpipers, a New Jersey basketball team
- Sandpiper 565, a sailboat design
- The Sandpiper, a 1965 film
- Sandpiper CI, a company based in the (UK) Channel Islands
- Sandpiper mine, a phosphate mine in Namibia
- Sandpipers of Nevada, a Nevada swim team
- Sandpiper pipeline, an underground oil pipeline in the United States
- Sandpiper Trust, a Scottish medical charity
- USS Sandpiper, a name for two U.S. Navy minesweepers
