= Marine resource extraction =

Marine resource extraction may refer to:

- Offshore drilling
- Deep sea mining
