= Deep sea mining =

Mineral extraction from the ocean floor

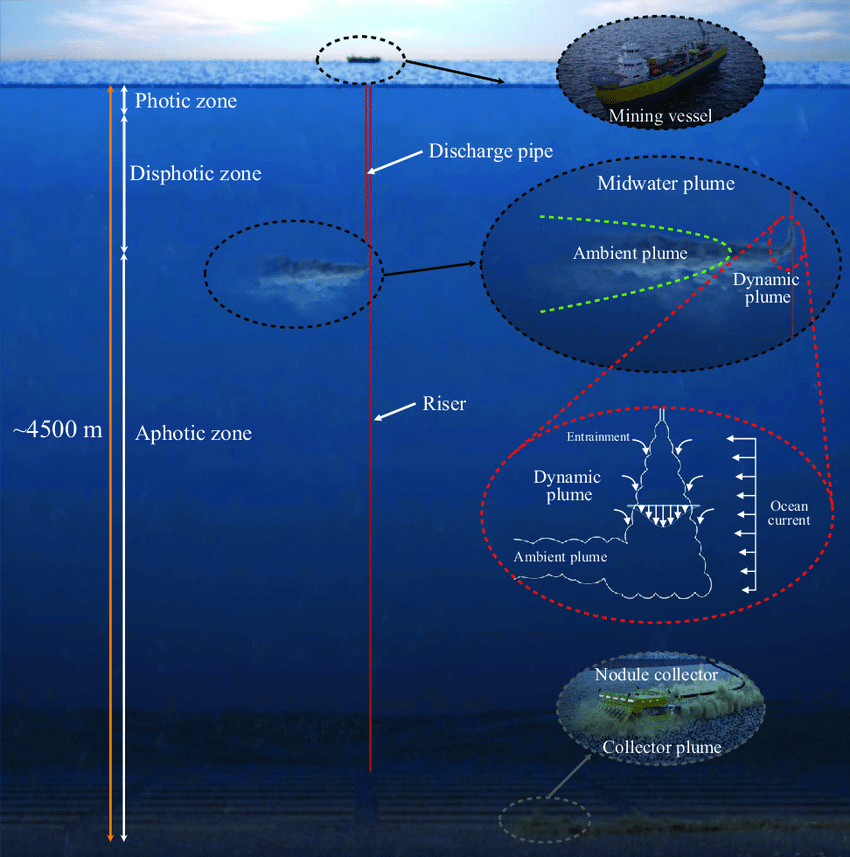
Schematic of a polymetallic nodule mining operation. From top to bottom, the three zoom-in panels illustrate the surface operation vessel, the midwater sediment plume, and the nodule collector operating on the seabed. The midwater plume comprises two stages: (i) the dynamic plume, in which the sediment-laden discharge water rapidly descends and dilutes to a neutral buoyancy depth, and (ii) the subsequent ambient plume that is advected by the ocean current and subject to background turbulence and settling.

Deep sea mining is the extraction of minerals from the seabed of the deep sea. The main ores of commercial interest are polymetallic nodules, which are found at depths of 4–6 km (2.5–3.7 mi) primarily on the abyssal plain. The Clarion–Clipperton zone (CCZ) alone contains over 21 billion metric tons of these nodules, with minerals such as copper, nickel, cobalt and manganese making up roughly 30% of their weight. It is estimated that the global ocean floor holds more than 120 million tons of cobalt, five times the amount found in terrestrial reserves.

Studies have shown that midwater mining techniques causing plumes can trigger bottom-up ecosystem impacts with severe consequences to marine life, extending beyond the initial mining area.

As of July 2024, only exploratory licenses have been issued, with no commercial-scale deep sea mining operations yet. The International Seabed Authority (ISA) regulates all mineral-related activities in international waters and has granted 31 exploration licenses so far: 19 for polymetallic nodules, mostly in the CCZ; 7 for polymetallic sulphides in mid-ocean ridges; and 5 for cobalt-rich crusts in the Western Pacific Ocean. There was a push for deep sea mining to commence by 2025, when regulations by the ISA were expected to be completed.

In April 2025, U.S. President Trump signed an Executive Order instructing the National Oceanic and Atmospheric Administration to expedite permits for companies to mine in both international and U.S. territorial waters, citing the Deep Seabed Hard Minerals Resource Act of 1980.

Deep sea mining is being considered in the exclusive economic zone (EEZ) of countries, such as Norway, where in January 2024 the government announced its intention to allow companies to apply for exploration permits in 2025. In December 2024, Norway's plans to begin awarding exploration licenses were temporarily put on hold after the Socialist Left Party (SV) blocked the planned licensing round as part of negotiations over the government budget. In 2022, the Cook Islands Seabed Minerals Authority (SBMA) granted three exploration licenses for cobalt-rich polymetallic nodules within their EEZ. In 2025, it was announced that the Cook Islands had signed a deal with China focused on deep-sea mining. Papua New Guinea was the first country to approve a deep sea mining permit in state waters for the Solwara 1 project, despite three independent reviews highlighting significant gaps and flaws in the environmental impact statement.

The most common commercial model of deep sea mining proposed involves a caterpillar-track hydraulic collector and a riser lift system bringing the harvested ore to a production support vessel with dynamic positioning, and then depositing extra discharge down the water column below 2,000 meters. Related technologies include robotic mining machines, as surface ships, and offshore and onshore metal refineries. Though largely composed of nickel and manganese which are most widely used as key inputs into the steel industry, wind farms, solar energy, electric vehicles, and battery technologies use many of the deep-sea metals. Electric vehicle batteries are a key driver of the critical metals demand that incentivizes deep sea mining, as well as demands for the production of aerospace and defense technologies, and infrastructure.

The environmental impact of deep sea mining is controversial. Environmental advocacy groups such as Greenpeace and the Deep Sea Mining Campaign claimed that seabed mining has the potential to damage deep sea ecosystems and spread pollution from heavy metal-laden plumes. Critics have called for moratoria or permanent bans. Opposition campaigns enlisted the support of some industry figures, including firms reliant on the target metals. Individual countries like Norway, Cook Islands, India, Brazil and others with significant deposits within their exclusive economic zones (EEZ's) are exploring the subject.

As of 2021, the majority of marine mining used dredging operations in far shallower depths of less than 200 m, where sand, silt and mud for construction purposes is abundant, along with mineral rich sands containing ilmenite and diamonds.

== Deposit types ==
Deep sea ore deposits are classified into three main types: polymetallic nodules, polymetallic sulfide deposits, and cobalt-rich crusts.

=== Polymetallic nodules ===
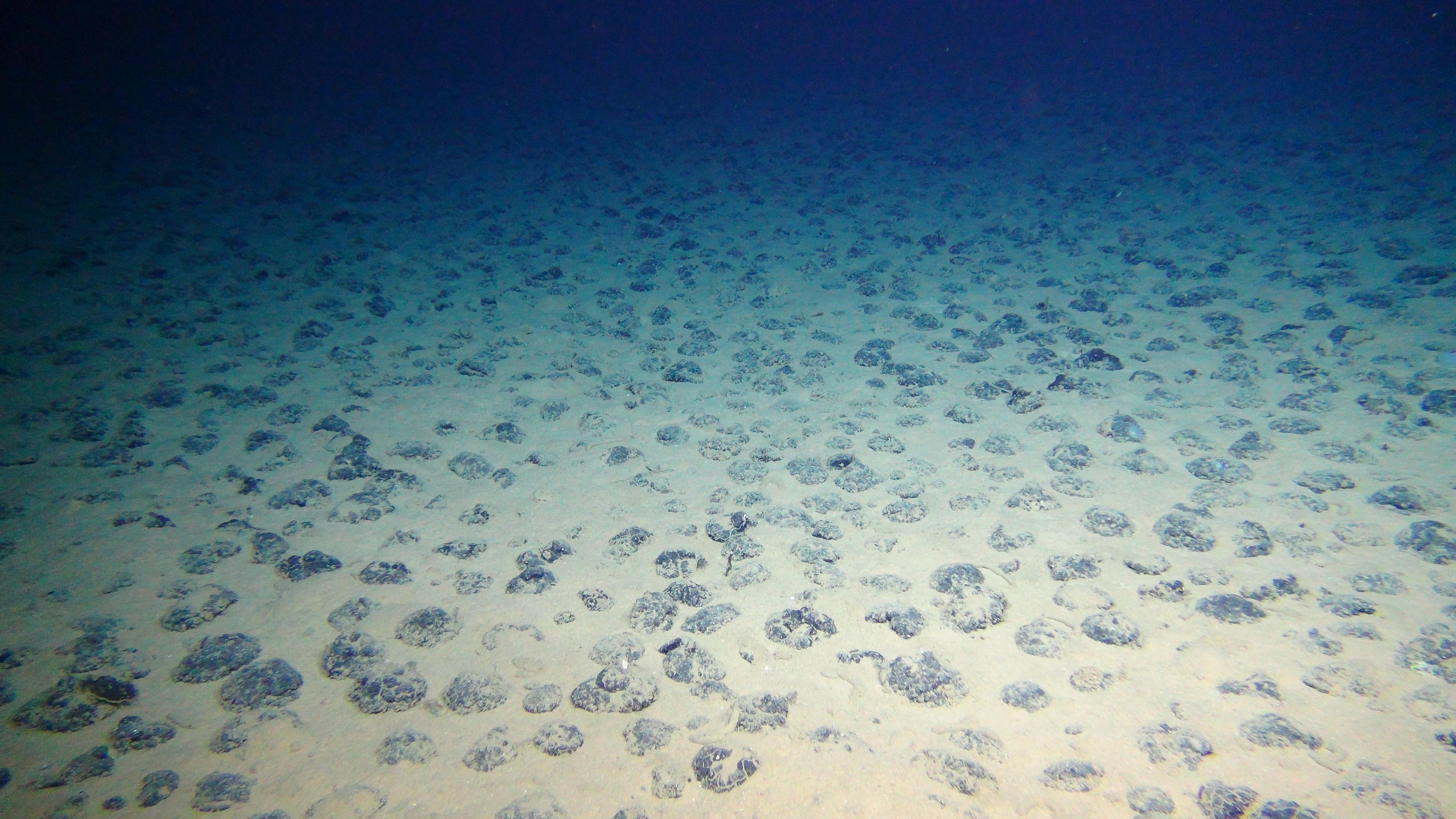
Polymetallic nodules on the deep seabed in the CCZ

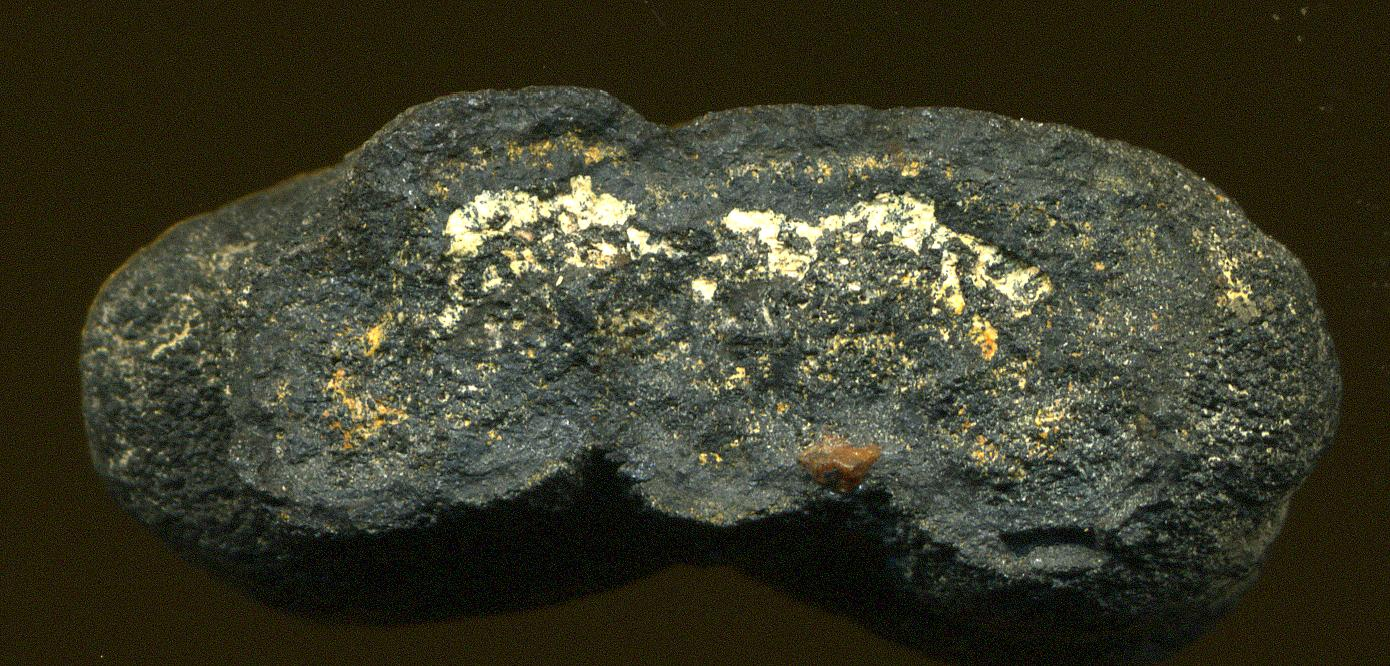
Example of manganese nodule that can be found on the sea floor

Polymetallic nodules are found at depths of 4–6 km (2.5–3.7 mi) in all major oceans, though due to their metallic composition those in the Pacific Ocean are of greatest commercial interest. Nodules may also be found in shallow waters like the Baltic Sea and in freshwater lakes. They are the most readily minable type of deep sea ore. These nodules typically range in size from 4–14 cm (1.6–5.5 in) in diameter, though some can be as large as 15 cm (5.9 in).

Manganese and related hydroxides precipitate from ocean water or sediment-pore water around a nucleus, which may be a shark's tooth or a quartz grain, forming potato-shaped nodules some 4–14 cm (1.6–5.5 in) in diameter. They accrete at rates of 1–15 mm per million years. These nodules are rich in metals including rare earth elements, cobalt, nickel, copper, molybdenum, and yttrium.

The Clipperton fracture zone hosts the world's largest deposit nickel resource. These nodules sit on the seafloor and require no drilling or excavation. Nickel, cobalt, copper and manganese make up nearly 30% of the contents.

Nodule chemical composition from selected areas (wt%)
Location	Manganese	Iron	Nickel	Copper	Cobalt	Total REE (incl Yttrium)
CCZ	28.4	6.16	1.30	1.07	0.210	0.0813
Eastern CCZ	31.4	6.3	1.40	1.18	0.174	0.0701
Western CCZ	27.56	6.1	1.36	1.08	0.250	0.0801
Indian Ocean	24.4	7.14	1.10	1.04	0.111	0.1039
Cook Islands	16.1	16.1	0.38	0.23	0.411	0.1678
Peru Basin	34.2	6.12	1.30	0.60	0.048	0.0403

=== Polymetallic sulfides ===
Polymetallic or sulfide deposits form in active oceanic tectonic settings such as island arcs and back-arcs and mid ocean ridge environments. These deposits are associated with hydrothermal activity and hydrothermal vents at sea depths mostly between 1 and 4 km (0.62 and 2.5 mi) and therefore located in shallower waters to other marine mineral types like polymetallic nodules. These minerals are rich in copper, gold, lead, silver and others.

Polymetallic sulphides appear on seafloor massive sulfide deposits. They appear on and within the seafloor when mineralized water discharges from a hydrothermal vent. The ionic metals and sulfides in the hot, mineral-rich water precipitate upon contact with cold seawater. The stock area of the chimney structures of hydrothermal vents can be highly mineralized.

=== Cobalt-rich crusts ===
Cobalt-rich crusts (CRCs) form on sediment-free rock surfaces around oceanic seamounts, ocean plateaus, and other elevated features. The deposits are found at depths of 600–7,000 m (2,000–23,000 ft) and form 'carpets' of metal-rich layers about 30 cm (12 in) thick at the feature surface. Crusts are rich in a range of metals including cobalt, tellurium, nickel, copper, platinum, zirconium, tungsten, and rare earth elements. Temperature, depth and seawater sources shape how the formations grow.

Cobalt-rich formations exist in two categories depending on the depositional environment:

- hydrogenetic cobalt-rich ferromanganese crusts grow at 1–5 mm/Ma, but offer higher concentrations of critical metals.
- hydrothermal crusts and encrustations precipitate quickly, near 1600–1800 mm/Ma, and grow in hydrothermal fluids at approximately 200 °C (392 °F)

Submarine seamount provinces are linked to hotspots and seafloor spreading and vary in depth. They show characteristic distributions. In the Western Pacific, a study conducted at <1500 m to 3500 m bsl reported that cobalt crusts concentrate on less than 20° slopes. The high-grade cobalt crust in the Western Pacific correlated with latitude and longitude, a region within 150°E–140°W and 30°S–30°N.

Deposit types and related depths
Type	Typical depth range	Resources
Polymetallic nodules Manganese nodules	4,000 – 6,000 m	Nickel, copper, cobalt, and manganese
Manganese crusts	800 – 2,400 m	Mainly cobalt, some vanadium, molybdenum and platinum
Polymetallic sulfide deposits	1,400 – 3,700 m	Copper, lead and zinc, some gold and silver

Diamonds are mined from the seabed by De Beers and others.

== Deposit sites ==
Deep sea mining sites hold polymetallic nodules or surround active or extinct hydrothermal vents at about 3,000–6,500 meters (10,000–21,000 ft) depth. The vents create sulfide deposits, which collect metals such as silver, gold, copper, manganese, cobalt, and zinc. The deposits are mined using hydraulic pumps or bucket systems.

The largest deposits occur in the Clarion–Clipperton zone in the Pacific Ocean. It stretches over 4.5 million square kilometers of the Northern Pacific Ocean between Hawaii and Mexico. Scattered across the abyssal plain are trillions of polymetallic nodules, potato-sized rocklike deposits containing minerals such as manganese, nickel, copper, zinc, and cobalt.

The Cook Islands contains the world's fourth largest deposit in the South Penrhyn basin close to the Manihiki Plateau.

Though the nodule fields of greatest commercial interest are located in the eastern Pacific, polymetallic nodules are also found within the Mid-Atlantic Ridge system, around Papua New Guinea, Solomon Islands, Vanuatu, and Tonga, and the Peru Basin.

Cobalt-rich crusts are found on seamounts in the Atlantic and Indian Ocean, as well as countries such as the Pacific Federated States of Micronesia, Marshall Islands, and Kiribati.

On November 10, 2020, the Chinese submersible Striver reached the bottom of the Mariana Trench 10,909 meters (35,790 feet). Chief designer Ye Cong said the seabed was abundant with resources and a "treasure map" can be made.

Promising sulfide deposits (an average of 26 parts per million) were found in the Central and Eastern Manus Basin around Papua New Guinea and the crater of Conical Seamount to the east. It offers relatively shallow water depth of 1050 m, along with a nearby gold refinery.

=== United States ===
A 2023 study identified four regions in US territorial waters where deep sea mining would be possible: the Hawaiian Islands, the southeastern Blake Plateau, California, and the Gulf of Alaska. Hawaii has both nodules and CRCs, while the other sites hold CRCs. Each area features distinct risks. Mining Hawaii could generate plumes that could damage important fisheries and other marine life. California's waters host massive ship traffic and communication cables. Alaska waters are rich in bottom-dwelling commercially valuable sea life.

In April 2025, U.S. President Trump signed an Executive Order instructing the National Oceanic and Atmospheric Administration to expedite permits for companies to mine in both international and U.S. territorial waters, citing the Deep Seabed Hard Minerals Resource Act of 1980. This would allow mining of the deep seabed for the first time in the country.

== Deep sea mining projects ==
=== Hakurei ===
The world's first large-scale mining of hydrothermal vent mineral deposits was carried out by Japan Oil, Gas and Metals National Corporation (JOGMEC) from August to September 2017, using the research vessel Hakurei, at the 'Izena hole/cauldron' vent field within the hydrothermally active back-arc Okinawa Trough, which contains 15 confirmed vent fields according to the InterRidge Vents Database.

=== Solwara 1 ===
The Solwara 1 Project was the first time a legitimate legal contract and framework had been developed on deep sea mining. The project was based off the coast of Papua New Guinea (PNG), near New Ireland province. The project was a joint venture between Papua New Guinea and Nautilus Minerals Inc. Nautilus Minerals held a 70% stake and Papua New Guinea purchased a 30% stake in 2011. PNG's economy relies upon the mining industry, which produces around 30–35% of GDP. Nautilus Minerals is a Canadian deep-sea mining company. The project was approved in January 2011, by PNG's Minister for Mining, John Pundari. The company leased a portion of the seabed in the Bismarck Sea. The lease licensed access to 59 square kilometers. Nautilus was allowed to mine to a depth of 1,600 meters for a period of 20 years. The company then began the process of gathering the materials and raising money for the project. The intent was to mine a high grade copper-gold resource from a weakly active hydrothermal vent. The target was 1.3 tons of materials, consisting of 80,000 tons of high-grade copper and 150,000 to 200,000 ounces of gold sulfide ore, over 3 years. The project was to operate at 1600 mbsl using remotely operated underwater vehicles (ROV) technology developed by UK-based Soil Machine Dynamics.

Community and environmental activists launched the Deep Sea Mining Campaign and Alliance of Solwara Warriors, comprising 20 communities in the Bismarck and Solomon Seas who attempted to ban seabed mining. Their campaign against the Solwara 1 project lasted for 9 years. Their efforts led the Australian government to ban seabed mining in the Northern Territory. In June 2019, the Alliance of Solwara Warriors wrote the PNG government calling for them to cancel all deep sea mining licenses and ban seabed mining in national waters. They claimed that PNG had no need for seabed mining due to its abundant fisheries, productive agricultural lands, and marine life. They claimed that seabed mining benefited only a small number of already wealthy people, but not local communities and Indigenous populations. Others chose to engage in more artistic forms, such as Joy Enomoto. She created a series of woodcut prints titled Nautilus the Protector. The activist community argued that authorities had not adequately addressed free, prior and informed consent for affected communities and violated the precautionary principle.

In December 2017 the company had difficulties in raising money and eventually could no longer pay what it owed to the Chinese shipyard where the "production support vessel" was docked. Nautilus lost access to the ship and equipment. In August 2019, the company filed for bankruptcy, delisted from the Toronto Stock Exchange, and was liquidated. PNG lost over $120 million dollars. Nautilus was purchased by Deep Sea Mining Finance LTD. PNG has yet to cancel the extraction license contract.

=== Shell ===
In the 1970s Shell, Rio Tinto (Kennecott) and Sumitomo conducted pilot test work, recovering over ten thousand tons of nodules in the CCZ.

=== Licenses ===
Licences for mineral exploration in the area beyond national jurisdiction registered with the International Seabed Authority (ISA) are mostly located in the CCZ. As of June 2025, the ISA has entered into 17 contracts with private companies and national governments for polymetallic nodules in the CCZ, one contract with the Government of India in the Central Indian Ocean Basin (CIOB), and one contract with Chinese contractor Beijing Pioneer Hi-Tech Development Corporation in the Prime Crust Zone (PCZ) in the Western Pacific.

=== Cook Islands ===
In 2019, the Cook Islands passed two deep sea mining laws. The Sea Bed Minerals (SBM) Act of 2019 was to enable "the effective and responsible management of the seabed minerals of the Cook Islands in a way that also...seeks to maximize the benefits of seabed minerals for present and future generations of Cook Islanders." The Sea Bed Minerals (Exploration) Regulations Act and the Sea Bed Minerals Amendment Act were enacted in 2020 and 2021, respectively.

In February 2022, the Cook Islands government Seabed Minerals Agency (SBMA) announced the award of three five-year licences exploration activities in Cook Islands EEZ to private companies Moana Minerals Limited, the Cook Islands Consortium (CIC), and Cook Islands Investment Corporation - Seabed Resources (CIIC-SR).

Moana Minerals is a subsidiary of Ocean Minerals LLC (OML), a US-based private investment firm led by President and CEO Hans Smit. Hans Smit previously led Neptune Minerals, Inc a DSM company interested in SMS exploitation in Papua New-Guinean waters. He also served as managing director of Royal IHC MMP, focused on underwater mining activities, and worked on underwater mining systems used for subsea diamond mining.

In 2023, the SBMA announced the results of a technical report on the polymetallic nodule deposit of the Cook Islands' exclusive economic zone, undertaken on its behalf by RSC Mining and Mineral Exploration. The study was based on the analysis of both historical samples from previous scientific cruises, as well as data from recent work undertaken by SBMA PMN exploration contractors CIIC-SR and Moana. RSC produced a JORC Code (2012)-compliant Mineral Resource Statement for parts of the EEZ totalling 6.7 billion tons of polymetallic nodules (wet), grading 0.44% Co, 0.21% Cu, 17.4% Fe, 15.8% Mn, and 0.37% Ni. Of this total resource, 304 million tons of nodules grading 0.5% Co, 0.15% Cu, 18.5% Fe, 15.4% Mn, and 0.25% Ni, are assessed at Indicated Resource, whereas Inferred Resources account for 6.4 billion tons grading 0.4% Co, 0.2% Cu, 17% Fe, 16% Mn, and 0.4% Ni.

				Metal grades (%)				
Classification	Cut-off (kg/m^{2})	Abundance (wet) kg/m^{2}	Nodules Mt (wet)	Co	Cu	Fe	Mn	Ni
Indicated	5	26.7	304	0.50	0.15	18.5	15.4	0.25
Inferred	5	14	6400	0.4	0.2	17	16	0.4
Global	5	14.4	6700	0.44	0.21	17.4	15.8	0.37

In 2025, the Cook Islands announced that it had signed a five-year agreement with China focussed on exploration and research into seabed minerals.

=== The Metals Company (TMC) ===
In 2011, the Republic of Nauru sponsored an ISA exploration contract with exploration activities carried out by Nauruan company, Nauru Ocean Resources Inc (NORI). NORI is a wholly owned subsidiary of Canadian company, The Metals Company. Since then, The Metals Company has conducted 22 offshore research campaigns on the NORI exploration area as part of its Environmental and Social Impact Assessment. On 29 June 2021, the Republic of Nauru invoked the 'Two-Year Notice' provision of the 1994 Implementation Agreement requiring the ISA to finalize and adopt a Mining Code within two years. This two-year deadline elapsed on July 9, 2023, meaning that The Metals Company and other contractors can submit an application for commercial exploitation at any time.

The Metals Company also controls two further ISA exploration licences in the CCZ through Kiribati-based Marawa Research and Exploration Ltd., and through its Tongan subsidiary Tonga Offshore Mining Limited (TOML), which it acquired from Deep Sea Mining Finance Limited in April 2020.

In April 2025, following U.S. President Donald Trump's Executive Order on offshore mining, The Metals Company submitted applications for a commercial recovery permit and two exploration licenses under the Deep Seabed Hard Mineral Resources Act and regulations set by the National Oceanic and Atmospheric Administration. The commercial recovery permit covers 25,160 square kilometers while the two exploration licence applications cover a combined 199,895 square kilometers.

=== Norway ===
In January 2024 Norway's parliament allowed multiple companies to begin submitting applications to prospect for DSM resources, mainly Seafloor Massive Sulfides (SMS), but also potentially Cobalt-rich crusts in the Norwegian EEZ, as well as on its continental shelf extension, along Mohns and Knipovich ridges Jan Mayen and Svalbard in the North Atlantic.

Norway's Institute of Marine Research recommended five to ten years of research before allowing mining. In late April 2024, the Norwegian Offshore Directorate invited interested parties to nominate blocks in this area for a first round of mineral exploration licences. First licence awards are expected for early 2025.

Three Norwegian start-up companies, Loke Marine Minerals, Green Minerals, and Adepth Minerals were expected to apply for licenses. In March 2023 Loke acquired Lockheed Martin subsidiary UK Seabed Resources Limited (UKSRL). This saw UKSRL's two PMN exploration licences in the CCZ, as well as its 19.9% stake in Ocean Minerals Singapore (OMS), an ISA contractor for PMNs in the CCZ. OMS is majority-controlled by Singaporean state-owned Keppel Offshore & Marine, now part of also Singaporean state-owned Seatrium.

Green Minerals is another Norwegian company which has expressed interested in mining seafloor massive sulfide (SMS) deposits in the Norwegian EEZ. In January 2023, Green Minerals signed a memorandum of understanding with the ISA to obtain an exploration licence for PMNs in the CCZ. In its May 2024 Capital Markets Day Presentation, it confirmed its ambitions to commence mining operations on SMS deposits on the Norwegian continental shelf and EEZ by 2028, as well as explore for PMNs in the CCZ in the future.

After in April 2024, the Norwegian government opened up an exploration area in the Norwegian and Greenland Seas, the World Wide Fund for Nature (WWF) declared that it would take legal action against the decision. According to the government, the seabed contains many resources including copper, zinc and cobalt, which are necessary for producing mobile phones, wind turbines, computers and batteries but as for now supplies are controlled by China or "authoritarian countries". In June the energy ministry submitted "a proposal to announce the first licensing round on the Norwegian continental shelf for public consultation." According to the government, the aim is to understand if a sustainable deep sea mining there can occur. Otherwise, "deep-sea mining would not be permitted".

== Extraction methods ==
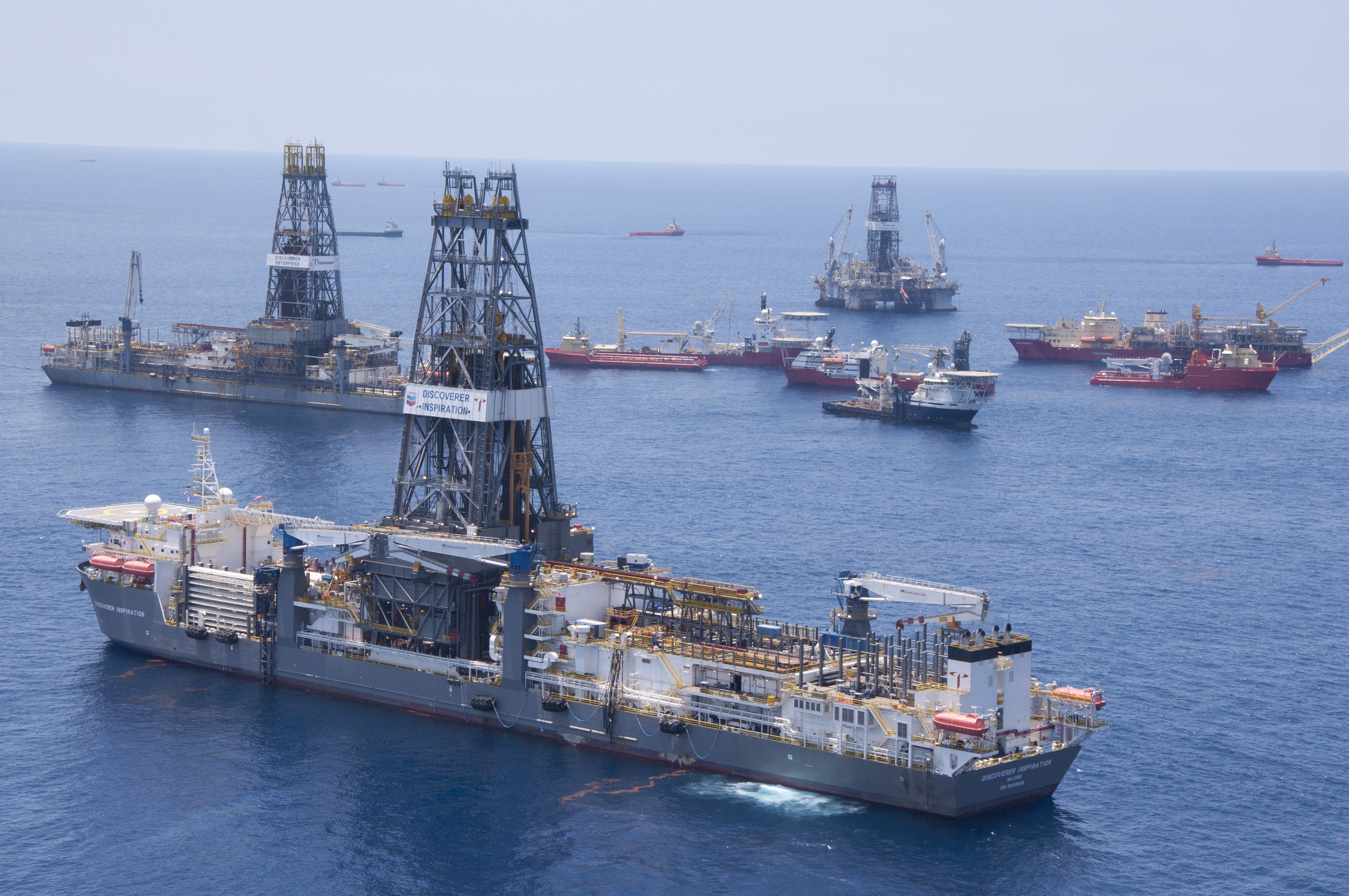
Discoverer Inspiration delivers new containment cap to the Deepwater Horizon oil spill on 10 July 2010. In the background are the Discoverer Enterprise, GSF Development Driller II, and Helix Producer I

Robotics and AI technologies used to selectively harvest nodules while minimizing disturbances to the deep sea environment are under development.

Remotely operated vehicles (ROVs) are used to collect mineral samples from prospective sites, using drills and other cutting tools. A mining ship or station collects the deposits for processing.

The continuous-line bucket system (CLB) is an older approach. It operates like a conveyor-belt, running from the bottom to the surface where a ship or mining platform extracts the minerals, and returns the tailings to the ocean.

Hydraulic suction mining instead lowers a pipe to the seafloor and pumps nodules up to the ship. Another pipe returns the tailings to the mining site.

Borehole Mining is used for mining of natural resources from below the seafloor.

== Process ==
The three stages of deep-sea mining are prospecting, exploration and exploitation. Prospecting entails searching for minerals and estimating their size, shape and value. Exploration analyses the resources, testing potential recovery and potential economic/environmental extraction impacts. Exploitation is the recovery of these resources.

Resource assessment and pilot mining are part of exploration. If successful, "resources" attain a "reserves" classification. Bottom scanning and sampling use technologies such as echo-sounders, side scan sonars, deep-towed photography, remotely operated vehicles, and autonomous underwater vehicles (AUV).

Extraction involves gathering material (mining), vertical transport, storing, offloading, transport, and metallurgical processing.

Polymetallic minerals require special treatment. Issues include spatial tailing discharges, sediment plumes, disturbance to the benthic environment, and analysis of regions affected by seafloor machines.

== Environmental impacts ==
Deep sea mining has significant environmental impacts. Research on deep-sea polymetallic nodule mining has substantially increased in recent years, but the expected level of environmental impact is still being established. Scientists from MIT examined seafloor sediment plumes generated by a prototype mining collector in the Clarion Clipperton Zone and found that the plume forms a low-lying turbidity current which hugs the seafloor. Another MIT-led study found that modelling can reliably predict plume behaviour in the midwater column, and impact is influenced by the quantity of discharged sediment, and the turbulence of the water upon discharge.

Meta-analysis of 11 separate disturbance and test mining studies showed that impacts are often severe immediately after mining, with major negative changes in density and diversity of most groups occurring. Almost all studies show some recovery in faunal density and diversity for meiofauna and mobile megafauna, often within one year. However, very few faunal groups return to baseline or control conditions after two decades. Benchmark Mineral Intelligence, commissioned by The Metals Company, conducted a life cycle assessment of the environmental impact of producing critical minerals from polymetallic nodules in the Clarion-Clipperton Zone (CCZ). The study found that the deep-sea model performed better environmentally than traditional land-based methods, showing 54-70% lower Global Warming Potential (GWP) on average, due to renewable energy use, high metal recovery, and efficient processes. Another study in the Journal of Cleaner Production found that the production of one billion electric vehicles using nodules would produce 90% less CO_{2} equivalent than producing the same number of vehicles through land-based mining. While some environmental consequences (such as sediment plumes, disturbance of the bottom, and toxic effects) are known, the scientific understanding of deep sea ecosystems is currently insufficient to evaluate all possible impacts.

Technology is under development to mitigate these issues. This includes selective pick-up technology that leaves alone nodules that contain life and leaves behind some nodules to maintain the habitat.

The United Nations Environment Programme (UNEP) emphasizes the need for a comprehensive assessment of the environmental impacts of deep-sea mining, which targets polymetallic nodules at depths of 3–6.5 km (1.9–4.0 mi), polymetallic sulphides at 1–4 km (0.62–2.5 mi), and cobalt-rich ferromanganese crusts between <400 m and 3.5 km. Researchers and governments have raised significant concerns about the potential impacts on unique and fragile ecosystems, with only 24.9% of the deep seabed mapped. These ecosystems are essential for ocean and carbon cycling and are vulnerable to climate change. There are widespread calls for a moratorium on deep-sea mining until its environmental, social, and economic risks are fully investigated. The International Seabed Authority (ISA) aims to finalize exploitation regulations by 2025, and a new agreement under the UN Convention on the Law of the Sea (UNCLOS) on marine biodiversity was adopted on 19 June 2023.

=== Sediment plumes ===
Plumes are caused when seawater and sediment separated from nodules at the surface are is returned to the ocean, increasing water turbidity (cloudiness). Plumes differ significantly from traditional mining tailings, as deep-sea sediment primarily consists of naturally occurring, unprocessed material rather than chemically altered waste. Plumes form wherever the sediments are released, typically either near the bottom or near the surface. Releasing sediment closer to the surface is cheaper, but allows it to disperse more widely.

When settling on the seafloor, sediments can bury or suffocate animals. Sediments raining down from above can also harm mid-water swimmers such as jellyfish, sea butterflies, and commercially fished animals.

Depending on particle size, water currents, and mining technology, surface plumes can spread widely. Fine particles (small and light) can remain suspended in the water column for extended periods and spread over large areas if released near the surface. In shallow water, sediment can resuspend following storms, starting another cycle of damage. In-situ studies show most seafloor sediment settles rapidly, with 90% depositing within 2 km and the vast majority within 9 km, even under extreme conditions, while heavy sediment blanketing remains confined to a small area near the source.

Beyond the immediate seafloor disturbance caused by collector vehicles, deep-sea mining generates midwater sediment plumes when waste water and fine particles are discharged back into the ocean. Research indicates that these suspended plumes can drift tens of kilometers from the mining site, potentially smothering filter-feeding organisms and disrupting deep-ocean food webs.

=== Benthic disturbance ===
Disturbing or, in the case of seafloor massive sulfides and cobalt crusts, removing parts of the sea floor impacts the habitat of benthic organisms, albeit to varying degrees.

A study analyzing data from 11 experimental mining simulations found that deep-sea mining activities cause immediate declines in faunal density and diversity, with mobile and small-sized fauna recovering more quickly. Some ecosystems fail to return to pre-disturbance levels after 26 years, while some faunal groups partially rebound, particularly meiofauna and mobile megafauna. Due to limited testing, comparable assessments for seafloor massive sulfides (SMS) and cobalt-rich crusts remain limited.

Nodule fields provide hard substrate on the bottom, attracting macrofauna. A study of benthic communities in the CCZ assessed a 350 square mile area with an ROV. They reported that the area contained a diverse abyssal plain megafaunal community. Megafauna (species longer than 20 mm (0.79 in)) included glass sponges, anemones, eyeless fish, sea stars, psychropotes, amphipods, and isopods. Macrofauna (species longer than 0.5mm) were reported to have high species diversity, numbering 80 -100 per square meter. The highest species diversity was found among polymetallic nodules. In a follow-up survey in areas with potential for seabed mining, researchers identified over 1,000 species, 90% previously unknown, with over 50% dependent on polymetallic nodules for survival.

=== Noise and light pollution ===
Deep sea mining generates ambient noise in normally quiet pelagic environments. However, planned operations will not use sonar and are not expected to make dangerously loud noises, with most noise highly localized and similar to that of typical marine shipping operations. Noise pollution affects deep sea fish species and marine mammals, though due to the low surface productivity of its surface waters the Clarion Clipperton Zone is unlikely to be a feeding or breeding site for large marine mammals. Impacts include behavior changes, communication difficulties, and temporary and permanent hearing damage.

Light pollution affects the environment of DSM sites as they are normally pitch dark. Mining efforts may increase light levels to illuminate the bottom. Shrimp found at hydrothermal vents suffered permanent retinal damage when exposed to submersible floodlights. Behavioral changes include vertical migration patterns, ability to communicate, and ability to detect prey.

=== Ecosystem ===
Polymetallic nodule fields are hotspots of abundance and diversity for abyssal fauna. Sediment can clog filter-feeding organisms such as manta rays. As they block the sun, they inhibit growth of photosynthesizing organisms, including coral and phytoplankton. Phytoplankton sit at the bottom of the food chain. Reducing phytoplankton reduces food availability for all other organisms. Metals carried by plumes can accumulate in tissues of shellfish. This bioaccumulation works its way through the food web, impacting predators, including humans. Deep-sea mining could impact species that lay eggs on the seabed, but it also poses respiratory risks from debris uprooted by mining.

A recent study claimed that nodules are also important for oxygen production in the absence of light and photosynthesis. Nodules the size of potatoes have shown to be able to produce an electric current that is almost equal to the voltage in an AA-sized battery. This generate electric currents strong enough to perform electrolysis, which splits water molecules into hydrogen and oxygen.

One report states that biomass loss stemming from deep sea mining is estimated to be significantly smaller than that from mining on land. One estimate of land ore mining reports that it will lead to a loss of 568 megatons of biomass (approximately the same as that of the entire human population) versus 42 megatons of biomass from DSM. In addition, land ore mining will lead to a loss of 47 trillion megafauna organisms, whereas deep-sea mining is expected to lead to a loss of 3 trillion.

Despite its remote and barren appearance, these portions of the seafloor are teeming with life. These are primarily invertebrates (worms, crustaceans, sea slugs, etc.). In recent research referring to the Clarion-Clipperton Zone (CCZ), they find that these ancient stable ecosystems mean there is great diversity among the species. There are only 438 named species that have been scientifically recognized in the CCZ. There have been over 5,000 identified species that are "unnamed," meaning they are morphotypes or specimens registered as distinct but not formally named. There could be up to 8,000 unrecognized species in these zones. Due to data duplication in the International Seabed Authority, the true biodiversity of these zones is likely undercounted, which increases the danger of mining. Deep sea mining in these zones creates the possibility of irreversible damage to the entire ecosystems and species that remain undescribed and undocumented.

The CCZ biodiversity patterns largely consist of phylogenetic clustering and can create greater vulnerability to mining exploitations. Additionally, species in the area that are locally rare, consisting of small populations in limited distributions, which is when closely related species tend to co-occur. This means if a lineage is extinguished many related species could be vulnerable. Therefore, as a whole they are more vulnerable to extinction through disruption. This stresses the importance of increasing knowledge of the species and phylogenetic clustering with robust biodiversity baselines and assessments, including the structuring of communities. Filling in the knowledge gaps of the taxonomy could help the areas recover after deep sea mining causes damage, as well as create accurate assessments of the biodiversity before mining occurs.

This kind of estimation does not take into account the recoverability of the situation: how long does nature need to reclaim an abandoned site. By contrast, a different study reported that deep sea mining would be approximately 25 times worse for biodiversity than land mining.

The species at the seabed, including those around vents, are not well known. A lot of these species are microbes. These vents have a wide variety of species around them who are adapted to extreme conditions. Therefore, it is possible they are able to handle extreme habitat changes that could result from deep-sea mining, but the full effects are not known yet.

According to the International Union for Conservation of Nature: "Not only is deep-sea mining an energy-intensive industry with high greenhouse gas emissions, but disruption of the ocean floor, which is by far the largest carbon storage reservoir on Earth, can lead to reduced carbon sequestration as well as the release of large amounts of the potent greenhouse gas methane, exacerbating the climate crisis". However, according to the United States Geological Survey, no methane hydrates are known to exist in the Clarion Clipperton Zone where most deep-sea mining activity would take place. Also, a peer-reviewed study published in the Journal of Cleaner Production found that using nodules instead of land-ore mining can reduce CO_{2} emissions by 80% (Ni), 76% (Cu), 29% (Co), and 22% (Mn).

=== Dark Oxygen ===
A new insight into the complexity of the abyssal environment has been proposed by a team of researchers from the Scottish Society of Marine Sciences. They have found that rising oxygen concentrations in some experiments where manganese nodules were present, and suggest the nodules are producing oxygen. The manganese nodules were proposed to act as a kind of battery due to their composition with different metals, and release oxygen into the environment by electrolysis. The research has since been subject to criticism including data omission and methodological concerns. Researchers from the University of Gothenburg criticized the authors for "poor-quality lander incubation experiments, leading to faulty oxygen flux measurements" and as a result called for the paper to be retracted. An academic at the University of Tokyo also criticized the paper for providing no evidence for electrolysis at the seafloor and for its inconsistency with decades of prior research that failed to report oxygen production, warning in an article in Science that "there is a high probability that the paper is wrong". The rebuttals were synthesised into a peer-reviewed article, which states that polymetallic nodules were not present in some of the experiments that recorded rising oxygen, that the geobattery mechanism is not thermodynamically possible, and that the rising oxygen is likely experimental artefact. The authors involved in the original study have also backed away from the two key claims made in the original article - that the rising oxygen levels can be attributed to polymetallic nodules, and that this is due to the nodules acting like batteries.

== Laws and regulations ==
Deep-sea mining is governed by the International Seabed Authority, an autonomous international organization, established by the United Nations Convention on the Law of the Sea (UNCLOS) to oversee and regulate all mineral resource-related activities in the seabed area beyond national jurisdiction.

=== Formation of the United Nations Convention Law of the Sea ===
The ocean was traditionally seen as an ungoverned space, reflected in the 17th-century principle of Mare Liberum, or the freedom of the sea, proposed by Dutch jurist Hugo Grotius. Grotius argued that seas were open to all states for navigation and trade, supporting Dutch maritime expansion. However, as technology advanced and human activity in the ocean grew, tensions over governance arose. This led to the competing framework of Mare Clausum, or the closed sea, proposed by English jurist John Selden in 1635. Mare Clausum advocated for coastal state sovereignty over adjacent waters, aligning with England's goals to control trade routes and fisheries.

The increasing complexity of maritime use and disputes between Mare Liberum and Mare Clausum highlighted the need for a comprehensive legal framework. Early efforts, including the United Nations Conferences on the Law of the Sea (UNCLOS I in 1958 and UNCLOS II in 1960), failed due to disagreements over the balance between freedom of the seas and sovereign rights. These issues were addressed with the adoption of the United Nations Convention on the Law of the Sea (UNCLOS) on 10 December 1982, providing a universally accepted framework. Amendments to the deep seabed provisions led to the 1994 Agreement and the Part XI Implementation Agreement, which entered into force on November 16, 1994, for ratifying states, aligning with the United Nations' role and Sustainable Development Goal 14.

UNCLOS, comprising over 400 articles and nine annexes, is the most detailed codification of maritime law ever undertaken by states under the UN. Driven by complex historical debates and evolving uses of the sea, the Convention represents a compromise between freedom and territorial control. Adopted after nine years of negotiations, it was celebrated as a milestone in international law, despite challenges over provisions related to reaching a collective consensus over the seabed and areas beyond national jurisdiction.

UNCLOS created three new key institutions, playing distinct yet interrelated roles, ensuring effective governance. First, the International Tribunal for the Law of the Sea (ITLOS), functioning as an independent judicial body with the authority to resolve disputes arising from the interpretation or application of the convention.

Second, is the International Seabed Authority (ISA), an autonomous international organization that oversees and regulates all mineral resource-related activities in the seabed area beyond national jurisdiction (ISA), with a "mandate to ensure the effective protection of the marine environment from harmful effects that may arise from deep-seabed-related activities."

Third, is the Commission on the Limits of the Continental Shelf (CLCS), playing a technical and advisory role, particularly in delineating the outer limits of a state's continental shelf.

Fourth, the Meeting of States Parties (MSP), or the Meeting of States Parties to the Law of the Sea Convention (SPLOS). Convened in accordance with Article 319, paragraph 2(e) of UNCLOS (1982), the MSP serves as a forum for member states to discuss and coordinate the implementation of the convention. It holds significant administrative functions, including the election of ITLOS, and CLCS members.

=== Legal territorialization of water zones ===
The 20th century saw significant challenges to the free sea order, particularly regarding claims over maritime resources. In 1945, the Truman Doctrine set a precedent by asserting U.S. jurisdiction over the continental shelf's natural resources, . This was followed by the 1952 Santiago Declaration, where Chile, Ecuador, and Peru claimed full sovereignty over their seabed and subsoil up to 200 nautical miles, extending this sovereignty to the waters and airspace above. The wave of decolonization also led newly independent states to prioritize control over marine resources for economic development. These declarations influenced the 1982 Law of the Sea, particularly shaping the exclusive economic zone and the continental shelf's extent. This development marked a shift towards a zonal approach in international maritime law, dividing ocean spaces into distinct jurisdictional zones governed by the principles of sovereignty and freedom.

Under UNCLOS, states have the right and obligation to regulate activities within their coastal waters and continental shelf, structured spatially by legal zoning as follows: The Territorial Sea, extends up to 12 nautical miles from the baseline, where states can regulate laws and resources, with foreign ships granted innocent passage, including warships; the Exclusive Economic Zone stretches up to 200 nautical miles, where the state holds exclusive rights over mineral and economic resources and must preserve the environment, though it cannot restrict foreign ships. The enclosure of the EEZ marked a shift from global commons to state-controlled waters for economic and security reasons; the Extended Continental Shelf, governed by complex criteria and negotiation, allows states to claim up to 350 nautical miles beyond their continental shelf. Articles 76 to 85 of UNCLOS Part VI emphasize the importance of the continental shelf's natural resources, excluding fisheries. Notably, the Area, where the Convention designates over 50 per cent of the seabed as international jurisdiction, recognizing it as the common heritage of humankind, which entails its non-appropriation by states or private entities, its use exclusively for peaceful purposes, and benefits shared equitably., Regarding Straits, Article 38 of UNCLOS ensures the right of international navigation, allowing continuous transit without coastal state interference, though states may regulate for safety and environmental protection. Additionally, the flag state holds jurisdiction over its registered ships, ensuring compliance with international laws.

=== The International Seabed Authority (ISA) ===
The International Seabed Authority (ISA) was established under Article 156 of UNCLOS 1982 as an autonomous intergovernmental organization. Following the adoption of the implementing Agreement on July 28, 1994, and its entry into force on November 16, 1994, the ISA held its inaugural meeting in Jamaica. It gained observer status at the United Nations in October 1996, confirming its recognition as a legal entity under international law.

Under Article 157 of UNCLOS and the Part XI implementing agreement, the ISA is tasked with organizing and controlling activities in the Area, designated as the common heritage of mankind under Article 140 (LOSC 1982, UN 1994). This role has grown in importance with increasing interest in marine mineral exploitation by states and private entities. The ISA operates through three main organs: the Assembly, the council, and the Secretariat. All 168 States Parties to UNCLOS, including the EU, are members of the Assembly, which elects the Council and Secretary-General, holds the authority to approve or reject the council's proposals for seabed mining, and oversees the Authority's budget.

The United Nations Convention on the Law and the Sea is related to the implementation of part XI of the United Nations Convention on the Law and the Sea. This established a legal and regulatory framework governing deep sea mining in areas by the location beyond the limits of the jurisdiction. This convention is considered one of the most successful multilateral treaties in history that governs a wide range of topics such as the limits of continental shelves to the right of the free navigation in water. Under this convention, the exploration and exploitation of seabed minerals have to be carried out under a contract with the International Seabed Authority and is subject to its rules, regulations, and procedures.

The 36-member Council authorizes contracts for seabed exploration and exploitation and proposes governance regulations subject to the Assembly's approval. It also nominates the Secretary-General, who serves a four-year term as the chief administrative officer of the ISA, supervises staff, and ensures impartiality by refraining from mining-related financial interests. Additional advisory bodies include the Legal and Technical Commission, which makes recommendations on mining rules, and the Finance Committee, which addresses budgetary matters. Members are nominated by states and serve in their personal capacities. The Enterprise, the Authority's commercial arm, is empowered to conduct mining operations, initially through joint ventures, to generate revenues for equitable distribution among developing nations. However, critics, particularly environmental groups, argue that the ISA faces a conflict of interest as both regulator and potential operator through the Enterprise. The ISA has denied these allegations.

=== Extraction and exploitation contracts ===
Article 153(2) of UNCLOS stipulates that exploration and exploitation of seabed minerals in the Area must occur under a contract with the ISA, adhering to its rules, regulations, and procedures cf. Article 162(2)(b) (UN 1982). Part XI of the Convention and the 1994 Implementation Agreement provide detailed mechanisms for ISA's administration of these contracts, ensuring compliance with international standards.

Contracts are open to both public and private enterprises sponsored by an UNCLOS State Party, provided they meet technological and financial criteria. The Council must evaluate whether economic pressures to exploit deep-sea minerals align with the need to protect marine ecosystems and biodiversity. Section 1(7) of the Annex to the 1994 Agreement requires contractors to complete preparatory work, including environmental baseline studies, impact assessments and other obligations, before exploitation. Applications must include an environmental impact assessment (EIA) and a program for oceanographic and environmental studies, with exploitation plans requiring detailed information. Revenues from deep-seabed mining are intended for equitable distribution for the benefit of mankind, emphasizing support for developing countries lacking resources to participate independently . To assist in its work, the ISA commissioned Massachusetts Institute of Technology in 2019 for a comparative study on various economic models to equitably share deep-sea resource revenues.

Since 1994, the ISA has authorized mining exploration contracts in the Atlantic, Pacific, and Indian Oceans, focusing on polymetallic nodules, polymetallic sulfides, and cobalt crusts found at depths of 400 to 7,000 meters. While regulations include environmental protection measures, scientists warn that mining these deposits risks irreparable harm to critical ecosystems, the ocean's carbon sink functions, and marine biodiversity.

=== State sponsorship ===
Under the ISA licensing framework, only specific entities are eligible to conduct deep seabed mining in the Area I. According to UNCLOS, such activities are restricted to States Parties or entities, state-owned or private, nationally affiliated with or effectively controlled by these states. Sponsorship by a State Party, as required by Article 153(2)(b), is mandatory. Furthermore, Annex III, Article 4(3). specifies that private corporations must secure sponsorship from their home state, and if another state exerts effective control, its sponsorship is also required.

A state or a collective number of states must secure sponsorship from the ISA to adopt the regulatory control approach to effective control in granting exploration contracts to private sector companies. To date, the ISA has adopted what is described as a regulator control in granting exploration contracts to private sector companies. In addition, the ISA has focused on the contractor company's location of incorporation, meaning that, in some cases, the text for effective control is whether the ISA has a registered company in the sponsoring state.

Sponsoring states' obligations cannot be fulfilled exclusively through financial and market tools. The required compliance enforcement and accountability mechanisms can only work in practice if there is a meaningful link between the State and the contractor, which is where the notion of 'effective control' comes into play.

To obtain approval, States or State-sponsored entities must submit a plan of work to the ISA, which, upon approval, becomes a binding contract. This framework allows private companies to collaborate with sponsoring states, leveraging their technological resources cf. Article 162(2)(b) while operating under ISA's regulatory oversight. The sponsorship requirement ensures entities comply with UNCLOS obligations, as highlighted by ITLOS, binding non-state actors to international and domestic legal responsibilities, cf. Annex III, Article 4(4), and Article 139 in the convention. Sponsorship also reinforces state accountability, ensuring non-state actors operate under domestic legal systems.

Non-parties to UNCLOS and non-state actors associated with such states are excluded from deep seabed mining activities. This exclusion underscores UNCLOS's role as the prevailing legal framework for regulating seabed resource activities, with alternative regimes likely deemed inconsistent with international law.

=== The Two-Year Rule ===
UNCLOS, as amended by the 1994 Implementing Agreement, provides the legal framework for regulating activities in the Area and tasks the ISA with developing and enforcing rules, regulations, and procedures for exploring and exploiting mineral resources.

A contentious provision within UNCLOS, referred to as the two-year rule, established in Section 1(15) of the Annex to the 1994 Implementation Agreement, permits any Member State of ISA, which intends to submit a plan of work for exploitation, to request the ISA Council to complete and adopt the necessary regulatory framework within two years. If the Council fails to finalize the exploitation regulations within the prescribed period, it is nonetheless required to "consider" and "provisionally approve" the submitted application, even in the absence of a fully developed regulatory structure, cf. Section 1(15)(c) of the Annex to the 1994 Agreement on Implementation. As further prescribed in Article 162(2)(o)(ii), UNCLOS though requires the ISA Council to adopt and temporarily apply rules, regulations, and procedures for activities like prospecting, exploration, and exploitation in the seabed area. These temporary rules must then be reviewed and approved by the Assembly, as outlined in Article 160(2)(e)(ii).

The council's decisions on these regulations must be reached by consensus, meaning no formal objections can be raised. Unlike most Council decisions, this rule, while ensuring broad agreement, enables any single objection to block progress, potentially leading to deadlock. In such cases, the council is required to pursue dispute resolution, including compulsory conciliation. This requirement for consensus is crucial, hence without agreed-upon regulations, the council is not authorized to evaluate applications for exploration or exploitation, effectively stalling activities in the Area.

Section 1(15) offers a pathway to circumvent such deadlocks, particularly when a small group of members obstructs progress. However, this mechanism is less effective when legitimate concerns exist about the adequacy of the regulatory framework, which may require more time to ensure a precautionary and thorough approach to resource exploitation.

=== Republic of Nauru ===
In June 2021, the Republic of Nauru partnered with The Metals Company to extract deep-sea minerals, driven by the need for renewable energy to support its energy sector. While deep sea mining could provide vital resources, its extraction requires significant energy and capital, and may cause environmental and social impacts on the island. Although it offers some relief, deep sea mining alone is unlikely to meet long-term demand.

By July 2023, Nauru's two-year rule expired, yet UNCLOS ensures that extraction beyond national jurisdiction should benefit developing states, This highlights the ongoing tension and key ocean paradigms, underpinning the discussing discourse between resource access, ocean health and equitable distribution, compounded by the challenges of crafting universally binding agreements under competing interests.

Since Nauru's application in 2021, the ISA has not established a clear legal process for mining, despite efforts since 2016 to create a Mining Code. The ISA aims to adopt a new code by 2025, which will offer a stronger regulatory framework, but concerns remain about legal gaps until then. Critics argue for a precautionary morato-rium or ban, with support from over 900 experts, but experts note that issuing mining licenses is complicated until the Mining Code is finalized.

=== Environmental Justice in Deep-Sea Mining Governance ===
Within deep-sea mining policies, environmental justice involves ensuring that decision-making processes, benefits, and costs are equally distributed or accessible among both current and future generations. Environmental justice in deep-sea mining is closely tied to human rights. Unequal distribution of environmental harms and benefits can undermine internationally recognized rights to health, food security, and participation in decision-making. Marginalized groups, including small island developing states and Indigenous peoples, are disproportionately affected when marine ecosystems are degraded. Integrating human rights principles into ocean governance frameworks emphasizes that environmental protection is not only an ecological concern but also a matter of fundamental human rights. This illustrates the need for transparent procedures, inclusive participation, and equitable benefit-sharing to ensure that deep-sea mining policies respect both environmental justice and human rights obligations.

Deep sea mining policies can perpetuate environmental injustice by giving financial benefits to small groups of mining operators while the public must take on the environmental burdens. Historically, negotiations surrounding deep sea mining policies have overlooked environmental impacts and overestimated economic benefits. This increases inequities in environmental burdens and undermines international environmental commitments. States that support deep sea mining despite its environmental risks create a potential for liability and legal challenges. The focus on economic exploitation over environmental protection and the exclusion of affected communities from decision-making processes contribute to the environmental injustice in deep sea mining. Deep-sea mining also threatens human rights due to overlooked human rights obligations in public participation at the International Seabed Authority. Enhancing public participation and independent review is necessary to protect human rights and the marine environment.

== Moratorium debate ==
=== Background ===
In June 2021, the Pacific island nation of Nauru notified the ISA of its intent to sponsor a mining application by The Metals Company, triggering a provision in UNCLOS known as the "two-year rule". This provision required the ISA to either complete regulations for exploitation within two years or consider mining applications under existing rules. The deadline passed in July 2023 without finalised regulations, and as of late 2025, the Mining Code remains incomplete.

The two-year rule created urgency in what had been a slow-moving regulatory process, sparking intense debate about whether commercial mining should proceed before comprehensive environmental safeguards are in place. Since then, a growing number of countries, scientists, and companies have called for a moratorium or precautionary pause.

=== Legal arguments ===
Supporters of a moratorium argue it is consistent with UNCLOS and may even be legally required. Article 145 of UNCLOS requires states to protect the marine environment from harmful effects of seabed activities. Article 140 requires that activities in the Area be carried out for the benefit of humanity as a whole. Legal scholars have argued that if these obligations cannot currently be met due to insufficient scientific knowledge or regulatory capacity, a pause is necessary.

A 2023 legal opinion commissioned by The Pew Charitable Trusts concluded that deferring deep seabed mining is required by international law, citing three reasons: the current lack of science on deep-sea ecosystems, the absence of completed regulations, and the ISA's limited institutional capacity. The opinion stated that "a moratorium or precautionary pause is not only consistent with UNCLOS, but is actually required by it."

Critics have also noted that public participation in ISA decision-making remains weak, with some scholars arguing that effective participation is a legal precondition for legitimate governance, not merely a voluntary option.

Opponents counter that UNCLOS explicitly permits exploitation applications even without finalised regulations. The 1994 Implementation Agreement allows the ISA to consider and provisionally approve plans of work for exploitation. Some legal commentators argue the precautionary principle is not binding customary international law and cannot override the convention's clear terms.

=== Countries calling for a moratorium ===
As of December 2025, approximately 40 countries have called for a moratorium, precautionary pause, or ban on deep seabed mining. These include Pacific Island nations like Palau, Fiji, Samoa, and the Marshall Islands, as well as European countries including France, Germany, the UK, Finland, Ireland, Spain, Portugal, and Sweden. In 2022, Palau's President Surangel Whipps Jr. launched an Alliance for a Deep-Sea Mining Moratorium at the UN Ocean Conference in Lisbon.

Norway initially moved toward opening its Arctic waters for mining after parliament approved exploration in January 2024. However, following sustained pressure from environmental groups and budget negotiations, Norway halted all licensing until at least 2029 and cut public funding for seabed mineral mapping. UN experts praised the decision as aligning with the precautionary principle and states' obligations under international law.

=== U.S. position and The Metals Company ===
The United States has not ratified UNCLOS and is not a member of the ISA. In April 2025, President Trump signed an executive order directing federal agencies to expedite permits for deep seabed mining under the Deep Seabed Hard Mineral Resources Act of 1980 (DSHMRA), a U.S. law predating the ISA.

Days later, The Metals Company, a Canadian mining firm, submitted applications to NOAA for exploration licenses and a commercial recovery permit covering over 25,000 square kilometres in the Clarion-Clipperton Zone. The ISA responded that it remains the only legal authority to regulate mineral activities in international waters and that bypassing its framework would violate international law. France's ocean minister called the plan "environmental piracy", and China's foreign ministry stated that deep sea mining must comply with UNCLOS.

=== Scientific concerns ===
Over 940 marine scientists and policy experts from more than 70 countries have signed a statement calling for a pause on deep seabed mining. They argue that scientific knowledge of deep-sea ecosystems remains insufficient to assess or mitigate environmental impacts. Environmental management approaches such as regional planning and adaptive monitoring exist but remain incomplete without clear thresholds for defining "serious harm" to the marine environment.

A 2023 study found that over 90% of species observed in the Clarion-Clipperton Zone are undescribed by science. Research published in 2025 examined the aftermath of a 2022 mining test in the Pacific. Scientists found that animal numbers dropped 37% and species diversity declined 32% in areas disturbed by mining equipment. A separate study of a 1970s test site showed that biological impacts persisted four decades later, though some organisms had begun to recolonise.

=== Corporate and financial positions ===
Over 65 companies and financial institutions have endorsed a moratorium on deep seabed mining. In 2021, BMW, Volvo, Samsung SDI, and Google pledged not to source minerals from the seabed and to exclude such materials from their supply chains. Other companies making similar commitments include Renault, Volkswagen, Rivian, Apple, Microsoft, Salesforce, and Philips.

A group of 40 financial institutions representing over €3.8 trillion in assets has urged governments not to proceed with deep seabed mining. The European Investment Bank has classified deep-sea mineral extraction as environmentally unacceptable.

=== Arguments for and against ===
The moratorium debate reflects competing narratives: proponents of mining frame it as necessary for decarbonization and mineral security, while opponents highlight epistemic uncertainty and argue that the deep sea should be left undisturbed.

Those supporting a moratorium argue that: scientific knowledge is insufficient to assess environmental risks; deep-sea ecosystems may take decades or centuries to recover from mining; metals can be obtained through recycling, improved efficiency, and responsible terrestrial mining; and the "common heritage of mankind" principle requires protecting the deep sea for future generations.

Opponents argue that: UNCLOS permits exploitation and a moratorium contradicts the treaty's terms; deep-sea minerals are needed for the clean energy transition; exploration provides essential scientific data; and contractors have legitimate expectations based on existing frameworks.

=== Current status ===
At its July 2025 session, the ISA completed a second reading of draft exploitation regulations but significant disagreements remain. No Mining Code was adopted and no deadline was set for completion. The Council agreed to launch an investigation into possible non-compliance following The Metals Company's U.S. application, sending a message that attempts to bypass the ISA would not be tolerated. Negotiations continue, with the next session scheduled for 2026.

== History ==
In the 1960s, the prospect of deep-sea mining was assessed in J. L. Mero's Mineral Resources of the Sea. Nations including France, Germany and the United States dispatched research vessels in search of deposits. Initial estimates of DSM viability were exaggerated. Depressed metal prices led to the near abandonment of nodule mining by 1982. From the 1960s to 1984 an estimated US$650 million was spent on the venture, with little to no return.

A 2018 article argued that "the 'new global gold rush' of deep sea mining shares many features with past resource scrambles – including a general disregard for environmental and social impacts, and the marginalisation of indigenous peoples and their rights".

=== 2000s ===
- In 2001, China Ocean Mineral Resources Research and Development Association (COMRA), received China's first exploration license.

=== 2020s ===
===== 2020 =====
- Researchers assess to what extent international law and existing policy support the practice of a proactive knowledge management system that enables systematic addressing of uncertainties about the environmental effects of seabed mining via regulations that, for example, enable the International Seabed Authority to actively engage in generating and synthesizing information.

===== 2021 =====
- A moratorium on deep-sea mining until rigorous and transparent impact assessments are carried out is adopted at the 2021 world congress of the International Union for the Conservation of Nature (IUCN). The vote, however, has no legal implications given that deep-sea mining regulations continue to be governed by the International Seabed Authority as established by UNCLOS. Researchers have outlined why there is a need to avoid mining the deep sea.
- Nauru requested the ISA to finalize rules so that The Metals Company be approved to begin work in 2023.
- China's COMRA tested its polymetallic nodules collection system at 4,200 feet of depth in the East and South China Seas. The Dayang Yihao was exploring the Clarion–Clipperton zone (CCZ) for China Minmetals when it crossed into the U.S. exclusive economic zone near Hawaii, where for five days it looped south of Honolulu without having requested entry into US waters.
- Belgian company Global Sea Mineral Resources (GSR) and the German Federal Institute for Geosciences and Natural Resources (BGR) conduct a test in the CCZ with a prototype mining vehicle named Patania II. This test was the first of its kind since the late 1970s.

===== 2022 =====
- Impossible Metals announces its first underwater robotic vehicle, 'Eureka 1', has completed its first trial of selectively harvesting polymetallic nodule rocks from the seabed to help address the rising global need for metals for renewable energy system components, mainly batteries.

===== 2023 =====
- Supporters of mining were led by Norway, Mexico, and the United Kingdom, and supported by The Metals Company.
- Chinese prospecting ship Dayang Hao prospected in China-licensed areas in the Clarion Clipperton Zone.

===== 2024 =====
- Norway approved commercial deep-sea mining. 80% of Parliament voted to approve.
- On February 7, 2024, the European Parliament voted in favor of a Motion for Resolution, expressing environmental concerns regarding Norway's decision to open vast areas in Arctic waters for deep-sea mining activities and reaffirming its support for a moratorium.
- In July 2024, at the 29th General Assembly of the International Seabed Authority in Kingston, Jamaica, 32 countries united against the imminent start of mining for metallic nodules on the seafloor. In his address titled "Upholding the Common Heritage of Humankind", President Surangel S. Whipps Jr. of Palau spoke about exploitation and modern-day colonialism.
- In November 2024, the People's Republic of China unveiled its first deep-sea drilling vehicle.
- In December 2024 Norway suspended deep sea mining, after the Socialist Left (SV) party said that otherwise, it would not support the budget.

===== 2025 =====
- On January 1st, 2025, Brazilian oceanographer Leticia Carvalho assumed the office of Secretary-General of the International Seabed Authority, after being elected in August 2024 to succeed Michael Lodge in the position.
- In April 2025, U.S. President Trump signed an Executive Order instructing the National Oceanic and Atmospheric Administration to expedite permits for companies to mine in both international and U.S. territorial waters, which would undermine the authority of the International Seabed Authority.
- Beginning in March and ending in July of 2025, the International Seabed Authority held their 30th session in Kingston, Jamaica, and again failed to agree on exploitative regulations for commercial deep sea mining in the Area.

===== 2026 =====
- The International Seabed Authority will begin their 31st session on February 23rd, 2026, as part of "Part 1" of the gathering, where the Legal and Technical Commission will meet. On March 6th, the session will end, before transitioning to a meeting of the Council from the 9th to 20th of the month. On June 29th, "Part 2" will commence, and will last until July 31st.

== Protests ==
In December 2023, the research vessel MV Coco was disrupted by Greenpeace activists blocking the collection of data to support a mining permit. Obstructing canoes and dinghies were countered by water hoses. The mining ship was conducting research for The Metals Company. The vessel MV Coco is owned by Magellan.

BMW pledged not to use DSM materials in its cars. In October 2023, the UK joined Canada and New Zealand in calling for a moratorium. In the beginning of August 2024, 32 countries were against the immediate commencement of deep sea mining. In December 2025, Norway decided to stop deep sea mining projects in its territory, at least until 2029.

=== The Indigenous perspective ===
For many Indigenous communities, the ocean is a central part of their origin story. Even for those without such direct connection, the ocean is often connected to sacred cultural practices. In the Pacific Island States, navigation of the oceans is a traditional practice that relies on several factors including color of the ocean, the shape of the waves, and the migratory patterns of sea creatures that could be negatively impacted by deep sea mining. Despite the cultural relevance Indigenous communities have in discussions of ocean sovereignty and deep sea mining, they have been left out of many important international conversations. In 2021, seventy-two indigenous groups from around the world came together as the Blue Climate Initiative, and called for an immediate ban on deep sea mining. In a similar statement, the Saami people of the Norwegian peninsula have urged the Norwegian government to stop deep sea mining operations and seek out Indigenous communities' perspectives and knowledge to ensure sustainability.

== Alternatives ==
The environmental organization "The Oxygen Project" generally proposes, as an alternative to deep sea mining, "system change to sustainable alternative economic models that don't require infinite resource extraction from our environment". The Environmental Justice Foundation and Greenpeace proposed circular economy, public transport, and less car dependency, energy efficiency and resource efficiency.

A possible alternative would be to reduce the weight of the mining tools. Ideally, this would mitigate some of the environmental issues with plumes, disturbing the sea floor, and other forms of underwater habitat destruction. Other alternatives include adding a collection device that would minimize debris and water columns or strip-mining, which would leave some sections, or strips, of the sea floor undisturbed with the intention of spacing out environmental disturbances. Other environmental mitigation options include changing the ways that the materials are processed, transferred, and transported. Many issues such as improper waste disposal, spilling of materials, and oil spills happen at this stage in the mining process. Properly following regulations regarding these activities as well as careful attention to these issues is suggested to reduce the amount of waste at this level.

== See also ==
- Seabed mining – Extracting minerals from the seabed
- Blue economy – Economy based on exploitation and preservation of the marine environment
- Blue justice
- Copper mining in the Democratic Republic of the Congo
- Deepsea mining in Namibia
- Deepwater drilling – Using a drilling rig to bore holes for petroleum extraction in deep sea
- Human impact on marine life
- Ocean colonization – Type of ocean claim
- Ocean development – Establishing of human activities at sea and use of the ocean

== Sources ==
- United Nations Convention on the Law of the Sea (PDF). United Nations. 10 December 1982.
