= Dark oxygen production =

Proposed deep-ocean oxygen production mechanism

Dark oxygen production (DOP) was a hypothesis published by Sweetman et al. (2024) suggesting that deep sea manganese nodules could possibly produce oxygen, based on experiments in the Clarion-Clipperton Zone, Pacific ocean. The findings remain preliminary, with some scientists suggesting need for additional experiments and evidence.
