= The Metals Company =

Canadian deep sea mining company

- Trade name: The Metals Company
- Formerly: DeepGreen Metals
- Type: Public
- Traded as: Nasdaq: TMC
- Founded: 2011; 15 years ago
- Headquarters: Vancouver, British Columbia, Canada
- Key people: Gerard Barron (CEO)
- Website: metals.co

The Metals Company, formerly DeepGreen Metals, is a Canadian deep sea mining exploration company. The company focuses on the mining of polymetallic (nickel, copper, cobalt and manganese) nodules in the Clarion Clipperton Zone of the Pacific.

== History ==
DeepGreen Metals was founded in 2011. That same year, the International Seabed Authority (ISA) granted exploratory contracts for polymetallic nodules and polymetallic sulphides in the international deep seabed Area to Nauru Ocean Resources Inc. (NORI), sponsored by the Republic of Nauru, and Tonga Offshore Mining Limited (TOML), sponsored by Tonga. NORI was and continues to be a wholly owned subsidiary of The Metals Company (at the time, DeepGreen Metals). The company would later acquire TOML.

In 2012, DeepGreen entered a deal with Glencore International Inc., in which Glencore agreed to purchase 50% of future nickel and copper production from the NORI contract area west of Mexico. In 2015, the ISA approved an exploration contract to MARAWA, sponsored by the Republic of Kiribati. That same year, MARAWA signed an exclusive commercial contract with DeepGreen.

In 2017, Gerard Barron was named Chairman and CEO, and in 2018 Dr. Gregory Stone, a former chief scientist for Conservation International, joined as Chief Ocean Scientist and Board Director.

In March 2019, Allseas became an investor and partner, adding $150 million in funding for DeepGreen's first large-scale feasibility studies.

In April 2020, DeepGreen acquired TOML from Deep Sea Mining Finance, giving the company exploration rights to an additional section of the Clarion-Clipperton Zone. The NORI, TOML, and MARAWA contract areas are all within the CCZ.

In 2021, DeepGreen Metals merged with Sustainable Opportunities Acquisition Corp (SOAC), a special-purpose acquisition company (SPAC), in a $2.9 billion deal that enabled DeepGreen to go public. The resulting company was renamed The Metals Company and began trading on the Nasdaq Stock Exchange under the ticker "TMC." In June 2021, NORI's sponsoring state, the Republic of Nauru, informed the ISA of its intent to begin exploiting deep sea minerals, which required the ISA to finalize and adopt regulations for deep-sea mining within two years. Also in 2021, The Metals Company hired architecture firm Bjarke Ingels Group to design the robotic vehicles and surface vessels that will be used to obtain and transport the metal nodules to an onshore processing facility.

In March 2022, The Metals Company, through its subsidiary NORI, submitted an Environmental Impact Statement for its planned integrated collection system test in the Clarion Clipperton Zone. Following an open stakeholder consultation, NORI was granted permission from the ISA to start trials collecting nodules rich in nickel, copper, cobalt and manganese on the NORI-D area. In 2023, TMC engaged Benchmark Mineral Intelligence to conduct a life-cycle analysis that modeled the environmental impacts of its first NORI-D project. The analysis found that TMC's project outperformed all land-based production routes in most categories. According to the report, deep-sea mining has a global warming potential that is 54%-70% lower than land-based mining, which often involves blasting, deforestation, carbon sink disruption, and contamination of groundwater through waste material tailings. Since first receiving an exploratory contract in 2011, The Metals Company has conducted 22 offshore research campaigns on the NORI exploration area as part of its Environmental and Social Impact Assessment.

In April 2025, following U.S. President Donald Trump's Executive Order on offshore mining, The Metals Company submitted applications for a commercial recovery permit and two exploration licenses under the Deep Seabed Hard Mineral Resources Act and regulations set by the National Oceanic and Atmospheric Administration. The commercial recovery permit covers 25,160 square kilometers while the two exploration licence applications cover a combined 199,895 square kilometers. The zones hold 1.63 billion wet metric tonnes of polymetallic nodules, which are projected to contain 15.5 million tonnes of nickel, 12.8 million tonnes of copper, 2 million tonnes of cobalt, and 345 million tonnes of manganese

=== NORI Project ===
Nauru Ocean Resources Inc (NORI) is a wholly owned subsidiary of The Metals Company. In 2011, the International Seabed Authority (ISA) granted a polymetallic nodule exploration contract to NORI, sponsored by the government of Nauru, for an area covering 74,830 square kilometres in the Clarion-Clipperton Zone (CCZ). The exploration area has the world's largest undeveloped nickel deposit. In June 2021, Nauru notified the ISA of NORI's plans to submit an exploitation application for the NORI area, which according to Section 1, Part XV of the 1994 Agreement relating to the Implementation of Part XI of the United Nations Convention on the Law of the Sea, gave the ISA a two-year time frame to complete the adoption of rules, regulations and procedures necessary to facilitate the approval of deep-see mining applications. As of July 2023, the ISA is required to consider and provisionally approve any applications for deep sea commercial exploitation based on the current fourth draft regulations.

== Products ==
The Metals Company plans to mine cobalt, copper, nickel, and manganese - metals necessary for building infrastructure, power generation, transmission, and batteries - from polymetallic nodules on the sea floor. The nodules are located at depths of 4–6 km and are abundant in the Clarion-Clipperton Zone (CCZ) in the Pacific Ocean between Hawaii and Mexico. TMC has exploratory licenses for approximately 224,533 square kilometres of the CCZ through deals with the countries of Nauru, Tonga and Kiribati. The area contains an estimated 11.5 million tonnes of contained metal. TMC plans to harvest nodules using a specially designed machine to collect rocks from the ocean floor that is attached to a ship at the water surface. Once collected, the nodules are dewatered and stored on a ship, with the excess sediment returned back into the ocean at depths below 1,000 meters to avoid most marine life.

== Criticism ==
In 2021, when The Metals Company was formed through a merger between DeepGreen Metals and Sustainable Opportunities Acquisition Corp, Industry observers questioned the company's "green" positioning. Baird Maritime noted that The Metals Company had no revenue or production as of April 2021, and highlighted the company's risky commercialization efforts: "Nobody has successfully managed to commercially harvest the nickel, copper, manganese, and cobalt from the nodules in 4,500 metres of water since interest was first stimulated in seabed mining in the 1970s." The Wall Street Journal pointed out the challenges experienced by CEO Gerard Barron's previous deep sea mining company, Nautilus Minerals; however, in 2023, the WSJ noted that, while the sustainability of sourcing battery metals remains under scrutiny, a recent study found that nickel production via nodule collection by TMC had an environmental impact that was 80% lower than existing sources.

Many scientists expressed concerns over the risks of deep-sea mining. In response to DeepGreen's efforts in Nauru, over 400 scientists signed a statement in opposition, alleging that it would result in the "loss of biodiversity and ecosystem functioning that would be irreversible on multi-generational timescales." In 2021, DeepGreen published an open letter defending its practices after four multinational corporations – BMW, Volvo, Google, and Samsung SDI – supported a World Wildlife Fund call for a moratorium. In November 2023, The Metals Company published an open letter to advocates of ocean conservation, calling for open dialogue on deep-sea mining, emphasizing environmental responsibility, transparency, and collaboration to balance sustainability with resource needs for the energy transition. In February 2024, Seaver Wang, ocean scientist and Co-Director of Climate and Energy at the Breakthrough Institute, published an article arguing for "open mindedness toward seafloor mining" given the various potential advantages over land-based mining, and warning that "calling for immediate moratoriums on deep-sea mining is not only premature, but a circumvention of constructive dialogue and negotiation." This view was later supported by the Federation of German Industries – which represents 38 industrial sectors, including automotive – who argued that "a precautionary pause or a unilateral moratorium will neither lead to less extraction of raw materials in the deep sea nor to more environmental research or the development of high environmental protection standards", and that small-scale operations should begin promptly to allow for the collection of further impact data.

The Metals Company says the harvesting in the ocean is less damaging than the land-based mining activities. Opponents to deep sea mining counter that the damage to the fragile ecosystem at the bottom of the ocean is irreversible and such mining is no guarantee that land-based mining will be slowed; however, a review of 11 separate seafloor disturbance experiments and test mining work shows positive – but not full – recovery for fauna after 26 years. Opponents say the ocean floor contains sea life that does not exist elsewhere and should not be disturbed. The speed of life and development on the ocean floor is very slow, disturbances, even minor, may have long-lasting effects.

The International Seabed Authority (ISA) has been negotiating regulations for deep sea mining for over a decade and have produced four drafts, including the consolidated draft, published in February 2024. The ISA stated in 2023 its intent is to adopt mining regulations in 2025. The Metals Company says it's leaving ample time for those rules to be finalized, but opponents say the company is bolting ahead of the collective efforts to come to a consensus about regulating the deep seas.

New research also sheds light on the possible effects of the polymetallic nodules on the sea floor. It has been claimed the nodules produce excess oxygen on the seafloor, and that removing the nodules could have effects that are completely unknown. However, the idea of metallic nodules as a photosynthesis-independent oxygen source has been questioned by scientists who point out "poor-quality lander experiments leading to faulty oxygen flux measurements" and unusable data, and that claims of electrolysis are unsupported by voltage measurements which undermine the authors' own conclusions. They also highlight an inconsistency with decades of existing research, notably that deep sea ecosystems constitute an oxygen sink.

In 2024, the company was subject to scrutiny on an episode of Last Week Tonight with John Oliver. It questioned the costs versus payoffs of deep sea mining and pointed out how The Metals Company used its financial leverage to strike a deal with the country of Nauru, stating, "While Barron has insisted that Nauru is no one’s puppet, there is a clear power disparity between an international mining firm hoping to make billions of dollars, and an environmentally ravaged island with a population of just 12,000 people."

The episode was criticised in an article by The Breakthrough Institute, an institute widely criticised for opposing advocates for meaningful climate action. The article claims that the segment repeated exaggerated misconceptions commonly circulated by opponents of deep-sea mining, especially regarding carbon storage and sediment disturbance, and that studies have shown otherwise. However, the institute is aligned with an ecomodernist philosophy, and still states that, "Other claims John Oliver made are somewhat more fair." This included the point made on the exploitation of developing countries such as Nauru.

In 2025, a study funded by The Metals Company showed that the Company's mining vehicles caused extensive harm to deep-sea animals. One month after a mining test was carried out on a deep ocean seabed, the number of animals in the mining area declined by 37% and the number of species in the area declined by 32%.

In January 2026 The Metals Company was sued by another deep sea mining company, American Metal Inc. The lawsuit alleges that The Metals Company engaged in "unlawful intimidation" related to competing proposals by each company to mine in the Clarion Clipperton Zone.
