= Nautilus Minerals =

Defunct Canadian company

- Type: Public
- Traded as: TSX: NUS
- Industry: Mining
- Founded: 1997
- Defunct: 2019
- Fate: Bankrupted
- Headquarters: Vancouver

Nautilus Minerals Inc. was a Canadian deep sea exploration and mining company founded in 1997, and listed on the Toronto Stock Exchange between 2007 and 2019. The company was known for Solwara-1, the first deep sea mining project, an attempt to explore and mine a mineral deposit on the seabed off the coast of Papua New Guinea. By 2019, the company had faced bankruptcy and was delisted due to long-standing environmental concerns about the project and financial turmoil, resulting in its assets being owned by Deep Sea Mining Finance Limited.

== Solwara-1 ==
The Solwara-1 project aimed to extract copper, gold, silver, and zinc from a seafloor massive sulfide deposit 1.6km below the surface of the Bismarck Sea, within the territorial waters of Papua New Guinea. The project was in partnership with the government of Papua New Guinea, which held a 15% stake, intellectual property rights, and had contributed PGK 327m (US$132.9m) towards the cost of the project. A 2011 mineral resource estimate produced for Nautilus Minerals indicated economic quantities of ore with average copper grades of 7.2%, with inferred estimates of higher grades. Copper deposits with grades above 5% are relatively rare and considered high-grade deposits that are highly profitable to mine on land, with terrestrial mines being as low as <0.5%. While other metals such as silver and zinc were also present, the metals of primary economic interest were copper and gold. A 2015 Nautilus-commissioned benchmarking report assumed that the proposed mine would produce 1,957,000 metric tons of mineralized ore of an average copper grade of 7% over the span of three years. The report also projected the total area of mining to be no greater than 11 hectares (0.11 km^{2}). However, there were no feasibility (or pre-feasibility) studies done on the project, and deep sea mining was, at the time of the project, unproven.

A conceptual mine plan, in a 2018 preliminary economic assessment made for Nautilus Minerals included the use of three specially designed remotely operated underwater machines for the mining and extraction of ore. All three of these seafloor production machines had already been designed, built, tested, and delivered to Nautilus in 2016. Recovery of the mined ore was to be carried out by the use of a highly specialized novel multi-purpose ship that Nautilus had contracted to build and subsequently charter. The eventual cancellation of the ship's contract due to payment defaults was a significant setback for the Solwara-1 project as, given the highly specialized nature of the ship's design and purpose, it was near-impossible to replace.

Location of the Solwara-1 site

The project faced steady opposition from environmental groups and local communities concerned about the potential impact on marine ecosystems and fishing livelihoods. Payment disputes between Nautilus Minerals and the government relating to the latter’s equity stake resulted in significant contractual challenges that hampered progress. By the first quarter of 2019, the project faced major delays as it required $350m to commence mining; the company had drawn down half of a $34m credit line earlier in the year, and had only $200,000 in cash as of September 2019. The project was eventually abandoned when the company went bankrupt. Deep Sea Mining Finance acquired the project, and now has ownership of interests and rights, key assets, intellectual property, and subsidiaries, and plans to develop the project into commercial production.

== Controversies ==
=== Environmental ===
In 2015, a Nautilus-commissioned environmental and social benchmarking report on the Solwara-1 project was released. In a presentation made to warn Canadian investors about the risks of investing in the company, the report was criticized by a coalition of Canada-based environmental groups such as MiningWatch Canada, for conflicts of interest and a lack of scientific understanding. Nautilus’ claim that the report represented independent research was challenged given that the report was based on information provided by the company. The report was also identified as having ignored issues raised by comprehensive independent reviews of the project’s Environmental Impact Statement (EIS). Further, the hydrothermal vents at the Solwara-1 site were considered rare ecosystem types, and in a BBC segment on the project's progress, David Attenborough called deep sea mining at hydrothermal vents “deeply tragic”. Additionally, the report had assumed no impacts on communities (no affected communities were identified, with no cultural claims) since it was located out to sea. This was despite there having been vocal opposition by coastal residents, who reported seeing dead fish wash up on shore and excessive levels of sediment in the area. Local protest groups that had formed, such as the Alliance of Solwara Warriors, voiced their opposition to the project. Finally, the report’s environmental comparisons to industrial-scale terrestrial mines were challenged given the number of mines planned by Nautilus, and the geographic differences between the projects.

=== Social ===
A major issue raised with the project concerned the question of the “social license” — an idea originating from the World Business Council on Sustainable Development — which had become influential in the mining industry since the late 90s. This license was seen as something to be obtained from the community by the company, where receiving it meant gaining the ongoing consent for and widespread support of the company’s operations. Despite the project’s location at sea, it was authorized by the government under laws and policies applying to onshore projects. These laws required hearings to be held in the affected area to provide local “landholders” the opportunity to air their views and to register any objections (although it did not give them veto rights). If no objections were made, the project was permitted to continue. Government officials maintained that the seabed could not have “landholders” apart from the state, and that therefore no special agreements needed to be made to grant the license. Company personnel played a key role in this interpretation of policy, eventually delineating an artificial community consisting of local coastal area from which the company could claim to have obtained a social license. However, no public record of the process of obtaining this license exists.

=== Financial ===
Having received permission from the government, the project continued, but ran into financial issues. In 2015, the company reported being targeted by a cyber scam resulting in the erroneous payment of $10m to an unauthorized account, that had been intended for the company’s shipbuilding contractor. The investigation findings of this incident were not disclosed to shareholders, and the company was unable to rule out internal fraud. Unable to resolve payment issues with the contractor and the shipyard the vessel was being constructed at, the half-completed vessel was repurposed by another company. In October 2019, Nautilus declared bankruptcy. The company’s major creditors attempted to gain control of its assets, but legal disputes over mining leases and concerns over environmental impacts complicated the process. Shareholders saw a sharp drop in the value of their investments, and creditors were expected to receive only a portion of what they were owed, including the Papua New Guinea government, which paid PGK 81.5m ($24m) in interest on loans relating to the Solwara-1 project. Prime Minister James Marape said that the country had “burnt almost PGK 300m … on a total failure”, and supported the establishment of a 10-year moratorium on deep-sea mining projects worldwide. Minister of State Owned Enterprises Sasindaran Muthuvel stated that he considered the country’s $120m debt from the project “money sunk into the ocean”. Given the economic and political fallout of the company’s failure, the bankruptcy raised concerns industry-wide about the viability of deep-sea mining operations.

== See also ==
- Deep sea mining
- Seabed mining
- International Seabed Authority
- The Metals Company, a Canadian deep sea mining company led by early Nautilus investor Gerard Barron
