= Seafloor massive sulfide deposits =

Mineral deposits from seafloor hydrothermal vents

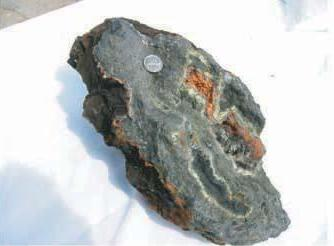
Seafloor massive sulfide sample collected from the Magic Mountain hydrothermal field, British Columbia, Canada

Seafloor massive sulfide deposits or SMS deposits, are modern equivalents of ancient volcanogenic massive sulfide ore deposits or VMS deposits. The term has been coined by mineral explorers to differentiate the modern deposit from the ancient.

SMS deposits were first recognized during the exploration of the deep oceans and the mid ocean ridge spreading centers in the early 1960s. Deep ocean research submersibles, bathyspheres and remote operated vehicles have visited and taken samples of black smoker chimneys, and it has been long recognised that such chimneys contain appreciable grades of Cu, Pb, Zn, Ag, Au and other trace metals.

SMS deposits form in the deep ocean around submarine volcanic arcs, where hydrothermal vents exhale sulfide-rich mineralising fluids into the ocean.

SMS deposits are laterally extensive and consist of a central vent mound around the area where the hydrothermal circulation exits, with a wide apron of unconsolidated sulfide silt or ooze which precipitates upon the seafloor.

Beginning about 2008, technologies were being developed for deepsea mining of these deposits.

== Minerals ==
Mineralization in submarine magmatic-hydrothermal systems is a product of the chemical and thermal exchange between the ocean, the lithosphere, and the magmas emplaced within it. Different mineral associations precipitate during the typical stages of mineralization that characterize the life span of such systems.

Minerals present in a hydrothermal system or a fossil volcanogenic massive sulfide deposit are deposited passively or reactively. Mineral associations may vary (1) in different mineralized structures, either syngenetic (namely, passive precipitation in chimneys, mounds and stratiform deposits) or epigenetic (structures that correspond to feeder channels, and replacements of host rocks or pre-existing massive sulfide bodies), or structural zonation, (2) from proximal to distal associations with respect to venting areas within the same stratigraphic horizon, or horizontal zonation, (3) from deep to shallow associations (i.e., stockworks to mounds), or vertical zonation, (4) from early and climactic to late stages of mineralization (dominated by sulfides, and sulfates or oxides, respectively), or temporal zonation, and (5) in various volcano sedimentary contexts, depending essentially on the composition of volcanic rocks and, ultimately, on the tectonomagmatic context. The most common minerals in ore-bearing associations of volcanogenic massive sulfide deposits (non-metamorphosed or oxidized) and their modern analogues are pyrite, pyrrhotite, chalcopyrite, covellite, sphalerite, galena, tetrahedrite-tennantite, marcasite, realgar, orpiment, proustite-pyrargyrite, wurtzite, stannite (sulfides), Mn oxides, cassiterite, magnetite, hematite (oxides), barite, anhydrite (sulfates), calcite, siderite (carbonates) quartz and native gold, and are differently distributed in the various associations schematized above. The most common hydrothermal alteration assemblages are chloritic (including Mg-rich ones) and phyllic alteration (dominated by “sericite”, mostly illite), and also silicification, deep and shallow talcose alteration, and ferruginous (including Fe oxides, carbonates and sulfides) alteration.

== Economic importance ==
Economic extraction of SMS deposits is in the theoretical stage, the greatest complication being the extreme water depths at which these deposits are forming. However, apparent vast areas of the peripheral areas of these black smoker zones contain a sulfide ooze which could, theoretically, be vacuumed up off the seafloor. Nautilus Minerals Inc. (Nautilus) was engaged in commercially exploring the ocean floor for copper, gold, silver and zinc seafloor massive sulfide (SMS) deposits, and mineral extraction from an SMS system. Nautilus' Solwara 1 Project located at 1,600 metres water depth in the Bismarck Sea, Papua New Guinea, was an attempt at the world's first deep-sea mining project, with first production originally expected in 2017. However, the company went bankrupt in 2019 after failing to secure funding for the project.

=== Known SMS deposits ===
Deep ocean drilling, seismic bathymetry surveys and mineral exploration deep sea drilling has delineated several areas worldwide with potentially economically viable SMS deposits, including:

- Lau Basin
  - Kermadec Volcanic Arc
  - Colville Ridge
- Bismarck Sea
- Okinawa Trough
- North Fiji Basin (see d'Entrecasteaux Ridge)
- Red Sea

== See also ==
- Hydrothermal circulation
- Mid ocean ridge
- Ore genesis
- RISE project
