= Energy efficiency gap =

Improvement potential of energy efficiency

Energy efficiency gap refers to the improvement potential of energy efficiency or the difference between the cost-minimizing level of energy efficiency and the level of energy efficiency actually realized. It has attracted considerable attention among energy policy analysts, because its existence suggests that society has forgone cost-effective investments in energy efficiency, even though they could significantly reduce energy consumption at low cost. This term was first "coined" by Eric Hirst and Marilyn Brown in a paper entitled "Closing the Efficiency Gap: Barriers to the Efficient Use of Energy" in 1990.

== Introduction ==
Energy efficiency refers to changes in equipment and behavior that result in increased energy services per unit of energy consumed, while behavioral changes that reduce energy use are often referred to as energy conservation. Energy intensity which measures energy consumption per Gross Domestic Product (GDP) is one indicator of energy efficiency.

Many people have attempted to measure the energy efficiency gap, and their approaches differ based on the definitions of the optimal level of energy use. A commonly used parameter originates from Hirst and Brown's paper; technically feasible and cost-effective energy efficiency measures that are not used. Many other studies have used this definition, such as International Energy Agency (2007) and Koopmans and Velde.

Jaffe and Stavins (1994) identify five types of optimality and the corresponding definitions of the energy-efficiency gap: the economists' economic potential, the technologists’ economic potential, hypothetical potential, the narrow social optimum and the true social optimum. In particular, economists' economic potential could be achieved by eliminating market failures in the energy efficiency technology market, while technologists' economic potential could be achieved by eliminating both market and non-market failures. Achieving the hypothetical potential would require the elimination of market failures in the whole energy market, for instance, having energy prices that reflect all externalities. The society can achieve the narrow social optimum by implementing all available cost-effective programs, and the true social optimum can be achieved if the environmental effects of energy generation and consumption is taken into consideration.

== Barriers for energy efficiency gap ==
Energy efficiency gaps exist because market failures exist. It is important to identify and understand those barriers in order to achieve desirable government policy interventions. According to Hirst and Brown (1990), various barriers that prevent the society from successfully closing energy efficiency gap can be divided into two categories: structural barriers and behavioral barriers. Structural barriers result from the actions of public and private organizations, and are usually beyond the control of the individual energy end user. Some examples are presented as following:

Distortion in fuel prices. The fuel prices that consumers pay do not reflect the social and environmental costs associated with fuel production, distribution and consumption. Consumers tend not to invest on energy efficiency technologies due to this distortion.

Uncertainty about future fuel prices. There have been great uncertainties with the prices for fuels, such as electricity and petroleum. More stringent environmental regulations and global warming concerns also increase the volatility of fuel prices. These uncertainties prevent consumers from making rational purchase decisions of new energy-using systems.

Limited access to capital. Consumers often face high up-front costs for energy-efficient systems. In addition, high discount rates are used to make tradeoffs between the initial capital investment and reduced operating costs, which also hinder the investments in energy-efficiency technologies.

Government fiscal and regulatory policies. Government policies tend to encourage energy consumption, rather than energy efficiency. For instance, government support has focused more on energy production, and the profit of electric utilities is a function of sales.

Codes and standards. The development of codes and standards often lag behind the development of technologies. It also takes a long time to adopt and modify standards, which becomes a barrier for energy efficiency technological innovation.

Supply infrastructure limitations. The deployment of energy efficiency technologies is highly restricted by factors such as geography, infrastructure and human resources.

Behavioral barriers are problems that characterize the end-user's decision-marking relating to energy consumption. Four examples are discussed below.

Attitudes toward energy efficiency. Public's awareness of and attitudes toward energy efficiency could greatly affect their energy-related purchase and consumption behaviors.

Perceived risk of energy-efficiency investments. Consumers and businesses can be very risk-averse in terms of investing in energy efficiency technologies. The uncertainties of fuel prices and high discount rate for operating costs have both made energy-efficiency investments even more "risky” for many decision makers.

Information gaps. There is often a lack of information on the performance of energy-efficient technologies. Consumers tend not to change their energy consumption behavior if little information is provided.

Misplaced incentives. The principal-agent problem and a lack of life-cycle thinking on costs and savings have imposed barriers for energy conservation.

Jaffe and Stavins (1994) categorize the barriers differently. They think that both market failures and non-market failures could account for the limited market success of the cost-effective energy-efficiency technologies. One important source of market failure is imperfect information, for instance the public good attributes of information and information asymmetry. Non-market failure may include the heterogeneity and inertia of consumers, and uncertainty about future energy prices and actual savings from energy efficiency investments.

== Measures narrowing the energy efficiency gap ==
Energy efficiency gap exists in various sectors, ranging from households, small businesses, corporations, and governments. Many policies and programs have been developed to overcome those barriers and close the energy efficiency gap.

Subsidies and incentives for energy-efficient technologies. Insufficient capital investment could be overcome by more aggressive tax subsidies, loan guarantees, and low-interest government loans for energy efficient technologies.

Minimum building and equipment efficiency standards. Minimum building and equipment efficiency standards are cost-effective approaches to save energy. Effective implementation and upgrading of building energy efficiency standards could improve the energy integrity of new buildings, while equipment efficiency standards could help reduce energy consumption and pollution during the life-cycle of equipment.

Information programs. Research has proved that providing accurate and trustworthy information on energy use and energy efficiency choices could help narrow the gap. Three forms of information programs can be implemented to help producers and consumers make more informed and rational decisions. The first one is generic information applicable to all energy decision, such as forecasts of future energy pricies; the second type of program is to provide comparative information to facilitate technology and product choices, such as product rating and labeling systems; the third type of program is to offer specific recommendations for producers’ and consumers’ investment choices or behavior changes.

Government procurement programs for energy-efficient technologies. Government agencies could be required to procure energy-efficient products. This would help improve the energy efficiency of government sector, and the “learning by doing” impact would create early markets for energy-efficient technologies.

Some real-world examples of those measures include the following: EU's energy consumption labeling scheme, U.S. DOE's building energy codes program, and EPA's and DOE's ENERGY STAR® voluntary labeling programs.
