= Sandpiper mine =

Planned mining development in Namibia

- Location within Namibia
- Location: Walvis Bay, Erongo Region, Namibia; 24°S 14°E
- Products: Phosphates
- Company: Namibian Marine Phosphate (NMP)

The Sandpiper mine is a Namibian planned mining development located 120 kilometres (75 mi) south-west off the coast of the harbour town of Walvis Bay. Sandpiper represents one of the largest phosphate reserves in Namibia, having estimated reserves of 1.82 billion tonnes of ore grading 19.5% P_{2}O_{5}. Although phosphate mining is controversial in Namibia because of its potential impact on the fishing industry, the mining license was granted in 2011.

The mine is owned by Namibian Marine Phosphate, a subsidiary of Mawarid Mining LLC which is owned by Omani billionaire Mohammed Al Barwani.

Establishment of the Sandpiper project was stopped in 2012 due to environmental concerns. In 2021 the assessment process was re-started. As of 2025 the environmental clearance certificate has not been issued. The mining license for the project is to expire in 2031.
