= List of people from Brasília =

The following list contains notable people from Brasília and the Brasília metropolitan area.

== Contributors to the foundation of Brasília ==
- José Bonifácio - first Brazilian chancellor to suggest the idea of building a capital in the interior of Brazil, away from its predecessor, Rio de Janeiro (never actually lived in Brasília, he died before it was incorporated)
- Don Bosco - priest, patron saint of Brasília (died before Brasília was incorporated, but did supposedly foresee the city’s incorporation in a dream)
- Juscelino Kubitschek - former president of Brazil (Brasília was built as part of his campaign to develop the interior of Brazil)
- Oscar Niemeyer - architect
- Lúcio Costa - urban planner
- Roberto Burle Marx - landscape architect

Niemeyer, Costa, and Marx designed and led the construction project to build Brasília.

== Notable faculty and almuni of the University of Brasília ==
=== Alumni ===
- Leticia Carvalho - oceanographer and international civil servant

=== Faculty ===
- Darcy Ribeiro - anthropologist, politician
- Oscar Niemeyer - architect, designer of Brasília, winner of the Pritzker Prize in 1988
- Athos Bulcão - artist
- Cyro dos Anjos - journalist, writer
- Cláudio Santoro - composer, violinist
- Affonso Arinos de Mello Franco - diplomat, journalist
- Nelson Pereira dos Santos - film director
- Cristovam Buarque - mechanical engineer and politician, former governor of the Federal District, former senator, former rector, and economics professor
- Teotonio Vilela Filho - politician, economist, current governor of Alagoas
- Otto Richard Gottlieb - chemist, Nobel Prize in Chemistry nominee
- Anísio Teixeira - educator, founder
- Antônio Augusto Cançado Trindade - jurist, elected judge of the International Court of Justice, professor of International Relations
- Francisco Rezek - former Justice of the Brazilian Supreme Court, former judge of the International Court of Justice (1996–2006), professor of Law
- Gilmar Mendes - justice of the Brazilian Supreme Court, former President of the Supreme Court, professor of law
- Jorge Antunes - composer
- Marisa von Bülow - political scientist and sociologist

== Athletes ==
- Endrick Felipe - football player (currently for Sociedade Esportiva Palmeiras)
- Kaká - footballer (retired)
- Lúcio - footballer (retired)
- Márcio Amoroso - footballer (retired)
- Marílson Gomes dos Santos - long distance runner, winner of the 2006 New York City Marathon
- Hudson de Souza - middle distance runner
- Joaquim Cruz - middle distance runner, won the gold medal in the 800m at the 1984 Summer Olympics and the silver medal in the same competition at the 1988 Summer Olympics
- Oscar Schmidt - basketball player
- Leila Barros - volleyball player, won bronze at the 1996 Summer Olympics and at 2000 Summer Olympics
- Paula Pequeno - volleyball player, won gold and was the MVP of the 2008 Summer Olympics
- Leandro Macedo - triathlon
- Mariana Ohata - triathlon
- Tatiana Lemos - swimmer
- Rebeca Gusmão - swimmer
- Nelson Piquet - racecar driver
- Nelson Piquet Jr. - racecar driver
- Felipe Nasr - racecar driver
- Rodrigo Medeiros - jiu jitsu world champion
- Paulo Thiago - MMA fighter
- Rani Yahya - MMA fighter
- Ketleyn Quadros - judoka, won the bronze medal at 2008 Summer Olympics

== Media ==
- Ana Paula Padrão - journalist
- Poliana Abritta - journalist

== Politicians ==
- Cristovam Buarque - intellectual, former dean of the University of Brasília, former governor of the Federal District, senator

== Artists ==
- Rainer Cadete - actor
- Ney Matogrosso - singer
- Oswaldo Montenegro - singer
- Cássia Eller - singer
- Zélia Duncan - singer, former lead singer of Os Mutantes
- Patrícia Pillar - actress
- Murilo Rosa - actor

== See also ==
- History of Brasília
- University of Brasília
