= Joseph Bennet Odunton =

Ghanaian public servant

- Born: Joseph Bennet Komla Odunton; 24 December 1920; Kpong, Gold Coast
- Died: 22 December 2004 (aged 83)
- Education: Accra Academy
- Alma mater: University College, Oxford
- Occupations: Public Servant, Press Officer
- Spouse: Mercy Odunton
- Children: Nii Allotey; Muriel

Joseph Bennet Komla Odunton (24 December 1920 – 22 December 2004) was a Ghanaian civil servant. He served as an assistant press secretary to the Queen of the United Kingdom, director of information services in the Nkrumah government in Ghana, and principal secretary to the ministry of information in Ghana on two occasions; first in the first republic and also in the NLC government.

== Early life and education ==
Odunton was born on 24 December 1920 at Kpong in the Eastern Region of Ghana (then Gold Coast).

He had his early education at the Aburi Methodist School from 1926 to 1934. He was admitted into the Accra Academy in 1935 for his secondary education where he obtained his Cambridge Certificate in 1939. In 1943, he entered the University College, Oxford. for his tertiary education on a government scholarship. He graduated in 1947.

== Career ==
After secondary school, Odunton joined the civil service. He worked for the then Gold Coast Information department as its Assistant Propaganda Cinema Officer. His duties included trekking and campaigning on recruitment for the army. He served in this capacity until 1943 when he was awarded a government scholarship to study abroad. A year after graduating at the University of Oxford, he returned to the Gold Coast and worked at the Ghana film unit as a script writer.

In 1952, he was appointed the Ashanti Regional Information Officer. Two years later, he was promoted to Senior Information Officer. In 1957, he became the public relations officer of the High Commission of Ghana, London.

He was later appointed Assistant Press Secretary to Her Majesty Queen Elizabeth II in 1959. He thereby became the first black African to hold an appointment at Buckingham Palace. He served as director of the Ghana Information Service from 1960 until 1 March 1964, when he was appointed Principal Secretary at the Ministry of Information and broadcasting, A year later, he was moved to the State Publishing Corporation as its managing director.

In April 1966, he was re-appointed Principal Secretary at the Ministry of Information by the National Liberation Council government. In 1970, he was made Principal Secretary of the Ministry of Defense. In 1973, he was again appointed Director of Information Services and in 1974, he became Director of Scholarships at the Scholarship Secretariat.

== Buckingham Palace Appointment ==
Odunton was appointed in 1959 by the Queen of the United Kingdom, Queen Elizabeth II, who was also Queen of Ghana, after a palace party. He was there to represent the Ghanaian High Commission in London. He began work on Tuesday, 19 May 1959, as assistant press secretary at Buckingham Palace. He was responsible for organising the Queen and her husband; Prince Philip's visit to Ghana in November 1959. He was also responsible for helping the Queen in her tour during the period. He worked as an assistant to Commander Richard Colville who was then the press secretary to the Queen. In his statement he said:

"I hope to be the first of many coloured people to be employed at the Palace".

== Personal life ==
Joseph was married to Mercy Odunton, together they had four children. His son, Nii Allotey Odunton, is a mining engineer and was the Secretary General of the International Seabed Authority. He was a member of the Methodist Church of Ghana. His hobbies included gardening and listening to music.

== Death ==
Odunton died on 22 December 2004.

== See also ==
- Royal Communications
- National Liberation Council
