= Festival de Brasília =

Brazilian film festival

Brasília Festival
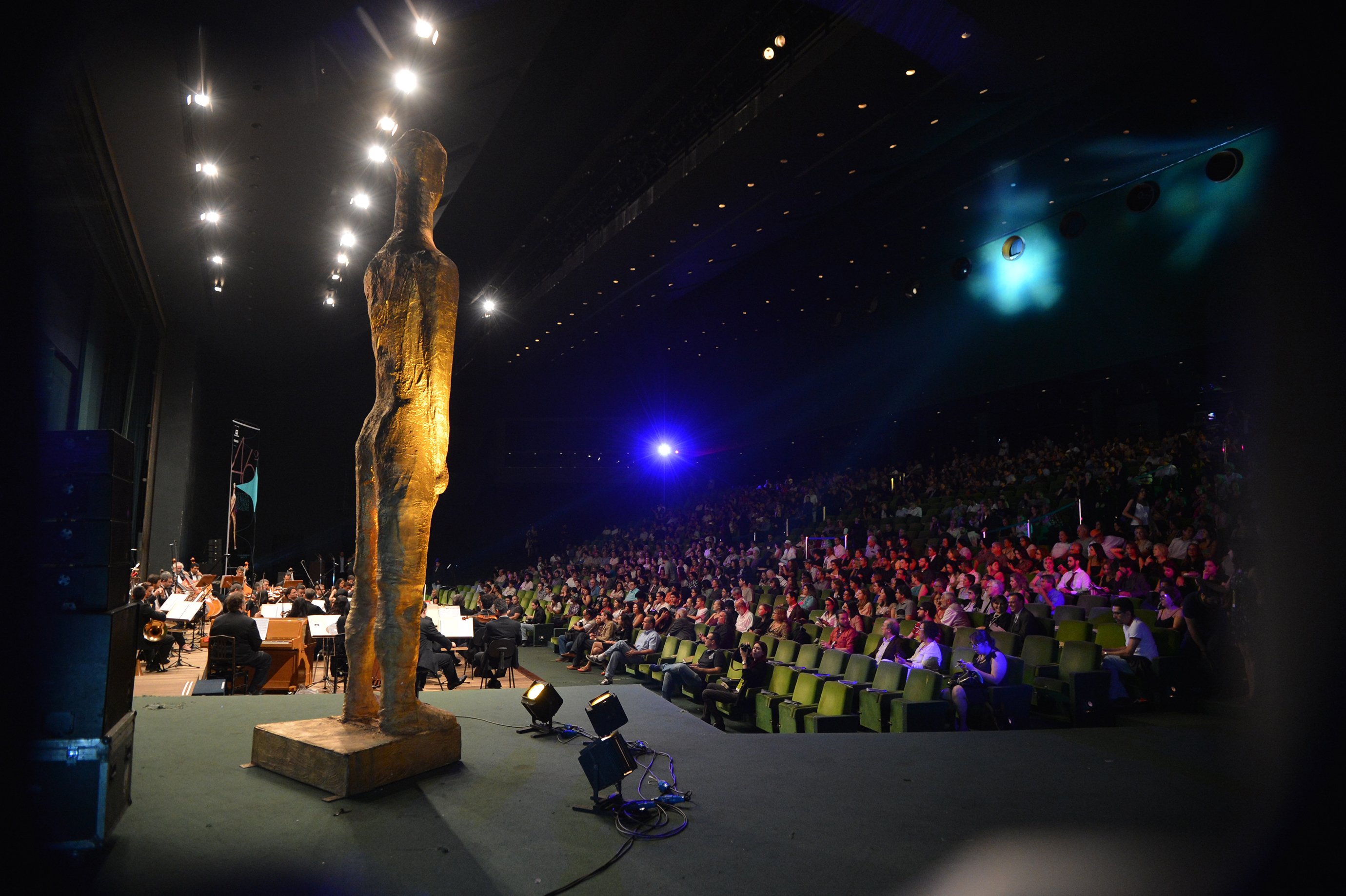
- Opening ceremony of the 46th Festival de Brasília in 2013
- Location: Brasília, Brazil
- Founded: 1965
- Language: Portuguese
- Website: https://festcinebrasilia.com.br/

The Festival de Brasília (Brasília Film Festival), officially the Festival de Brasília do Cinema Brasileiro, (Note: English: Festival of Brasília for Brazilian Cinema) is a film festival held in Brasília, Brazil. Known as Semana do Cinema Brasileiro (Brazilian Film Week) during the first two editions, it was founded by University of Brasília's diplomat Paulo Emílio Sales Gomes in 1965 and is the oldest film festival in Brazil.

The winners receive the Troféu Candango (Candango Trophy), named in honor of brasilienses, as well as cash prizes. Other prizes include the Prêmio Zózimo Bulbul, the Troféu Saruê, and the Prêmio Marco Antônio Guimarães.

== Category ==
=== Feature film ===
- Best Feature Film
- Best Director
- Best Actor
- Best Actress
- Best Supporting Actor
- Best Supporting Actress
- Best Screenplay
- Best Photograph
- Best Art Direction
- Best Soundtrack
- Best Sound
- Best Editing

=== Short film ===
- Best Short film
- Best Director
- Best Actor
- Best Actress
- Best Screenplay
- Best Photograph
- Best Art Direction
- Best Soundtrack
- Best Sound
- Best Editing

=== Other ===
- Prêmio Zózimo Bulbul
- Prêmio Aquisição Canal Brasil de Curtas
- Prêmio Marco Antônio Guimarães
- Troféu Saruê
