= Michael Lodge =

British international lawyer

Michael W. Lodge
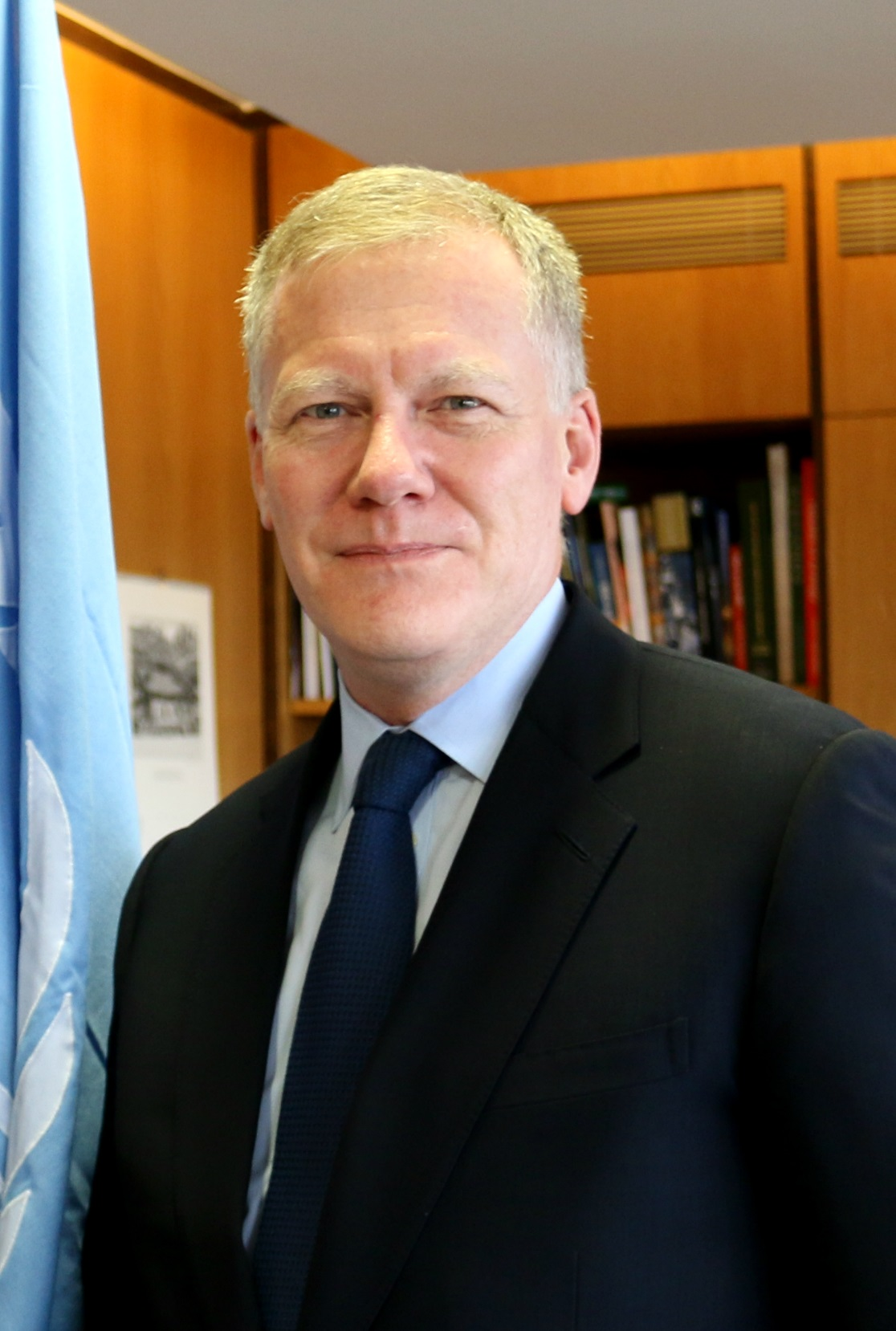

Secretary-General of the International Seabed Authority
- In office 2016–2024
- Preceded by: Nii Allotey Odunton (Ghana)
- Succeeded by: Leticia Carvalho (Brazil)

Personal details
- Education: University of East Anglia; London School of Economics

Michael W. Lodge is a British lawyer who served as Secretary-General of the International Seabed Authority from 2016 to 2024.

== Education ==
Lodge studied law at the University of East Anglia and was later awarded a Master of Science degree in marine policy from the London School of Economics. He was called to the bar at Gray's Inn in London.

== Career ==
Lodge worked as a legal counsel for the Pacific Islands Forum Fisheries Agency (1991–1995) and the International Seabed Authority (1996–2003), and as counselor for the OECD Roundtable on Sustainable Development (2004–2007). He was a lead negotiator for the South Pacific island states for the 1995 United Nations Fish Stocks Agreement and has worked as a consultant on fisheries and environmental and international law.

In 2016 Lodge succeeded Nii Allotey Odunton as Secretary-General of the International Seabed Authority, having served as Deputy to the Secretary-General and Legal Counsel since 2011. He was re-elected for a second four-year term in 2020, but was unsuccessful in his bid to secure a third term, losing to the Brazilian oceanographer Leticia Carvalho in the election held in August 2024. Lodge had been criticised for pushing for industrial deep sea mining to begin before formal regulations were in place.

Lodge held appointments as an associate fellow of Chatham House in London (2007), a visiting fellow of Somerville College, Oxford (2012–2013), and a member of the World Economic Forum global agenda council on oceans (2011–2016). He is also the author of over 25 books and articles on the law of the sea and oceans policy.

In 2020, Lodge was recognised as an International Gender Champion.
