= Maritime nation =

Nation that is dependent on the use of the sea for commerce or warfighting

A maritime nation is any nation that borders the sea and is dependent on its use for the majority of the following state activities: commerce and transport, war, to define a territorial boundary, or for any maritime activity (activities using the sea to convey or produce an end result).

Historically, the term has been used to refer to a thalassocracy such as Carthage and Phoenicia but during the medieval period increasingly became associated with the Maritime Republics of Venice, Pisa, Genoa, Amalfi, Gaeta, Ancona and Ragusa.

The interests of a modern maritime state can be in conflict with those of the coastal states that do not depend on the sea trade routes in a major way. For example, when the marine pollution is concerned, the coastal states seek to protect their shores and waters, while the maritime nations are concerned with limits the protective regulations place onto the freedom of navigation. Many states have both maritime and coastal interests, so the groups of coastal and maritime states intersect to a large degree.

== Sources ==
- Jin, Alan Tan Khee (1997). "The Regulation of Vessel-Source Marine Pollution: Reconciling the Maritime and Coastal State Interests". Singapore Journal of International & Comparative Law. 1 (1): 355–381.
