= Virginia Commentary =

Literary work on international law

- Original title: United Nations Convention on the Law of the Sea 1982: A Commentary
- Subject: Law of the sea
- Published: 1985–2011

Virginia Commentary is an informal title of a document, the United Nations Convention on the Law of the Sea 1982: A Commentary, providing an account of the negotiations and analysis of the United Nations Conference on the Law of the Sea convention articles. This seven-volume work was published between 1985 and 2011 with the goal of better understanding of the lawmaking process at the Third United Nations Conference on the Law of the Sea (UNCLOS III). The informal title is due to the University of Virginia School of Law, where, at the Center for Oceans Law and Policy, the commentary was put together.

Virginia Commentary primarily concentrates on the history of the negotiations that led to the convention and is less of a commentary on the convention itself. It was published to a large extent before the convention went into force in 1994, the commentary thus does not contain a survey of case law or state practices; these can be found in a different book with a similar title, United Nations Convention on the Law of the Sea: A Commentary (edited by Alexander Proelss), published in 2017.

The Virginia Commentary is an important resource for interpretation of the Convention and its Implementation Agreement of 1994, commonly cited in both court filings and research papers on the subject.

== History ==
Satya Nandan had played an important role in the preparation of the Virginia Commentary. In 1976 he had indicated the need of the travaux préparatoires for the treaty to the Center for Oceans Law and Policy and worked as a general editor of the set of volumes alongside Shabtai Rosenne.

The UNCLOS III was forged to a large extent in informal meetings, thus the Commentary is partly based on recollections of participants and does not represent an official record.

== Structure ==
Volume I of the Commentary (published in 1985, ISBN 90-247-3145-3) includes the text of the Convention describes UNCLOS III negotiating process and techniques. Volumes II–VI contain material about each article of the Convention:

- volume II (1993, ISBN 0-7923-2471-4): Articles 1 to 85, Annexes I and II and Final Act, Annex II;
- volume III (1995, ISBN 90-411-0035-0): Second Committee: Articles 86 to 132 and supplementary documents;
- volume IV (1991, ISBN 0-7923-0764-X). Third Committee: Articles 192 to 278 and Final Act, Annex VI;
- volume V (1989, ISBN 90-247-3719-2). Informal Plenary Sessions: Settlement of Disputes, General and Final Provisions: Article 279 to 320, Annexes V, VI, VII, VIII and IX, and Final Act, Annex I, Resolutions I, III and IV;
- volume VI (2002, ISBN 90-411-1981-7). First Committee: Articles 133 to 191, Annexes III and IV, Final Act, Annex I, Resolution II, Agreement relating to the Implementation of Part XI, and Documentary Annexes I, II and III.

Volume VII (2011) contains the consolidated text of the Convention with the 1994 Part XI Agreement, the 1995 Straddling Fish Stocks and Highly Migratory Fish Stocks Agreement, and indices.

== Sources ==
- Noyes, John E. (2014). "Memorializing UNCLOS III, Interpreting the Law of the Sea Convention, and the Virginia Commentary". Peaceful Order in the World's Oceans. Brill. pp. 218–238. doi:10.1163/9789004274976_018. ISBN 9789004274976.
- Boyle, Alan (2019-06-07). "United Nations Convention on the Law of the Sea: A Commentary, edited by Alexander Proelss". International and Comparative Law Quarterly. 68 (3). Cambridge University Press (CUP): 771–772. doi:10.1017/s0020589319000198. ISSN 0020-5893. S2CID 260608484.
- Nordquist, Myron H.; Nandan, Satya N.; Kraska, James (2011-01-01). "Preliminary Material". United Nations Convention on the Law of the Sea 1982, Volume VII. Brill. doi:10.1163/9789004190054_001. ISBN 978-90-04-19005-4.
