= Upholding the Common Heritage of Humankind =

2024 speech about deep-sea mining

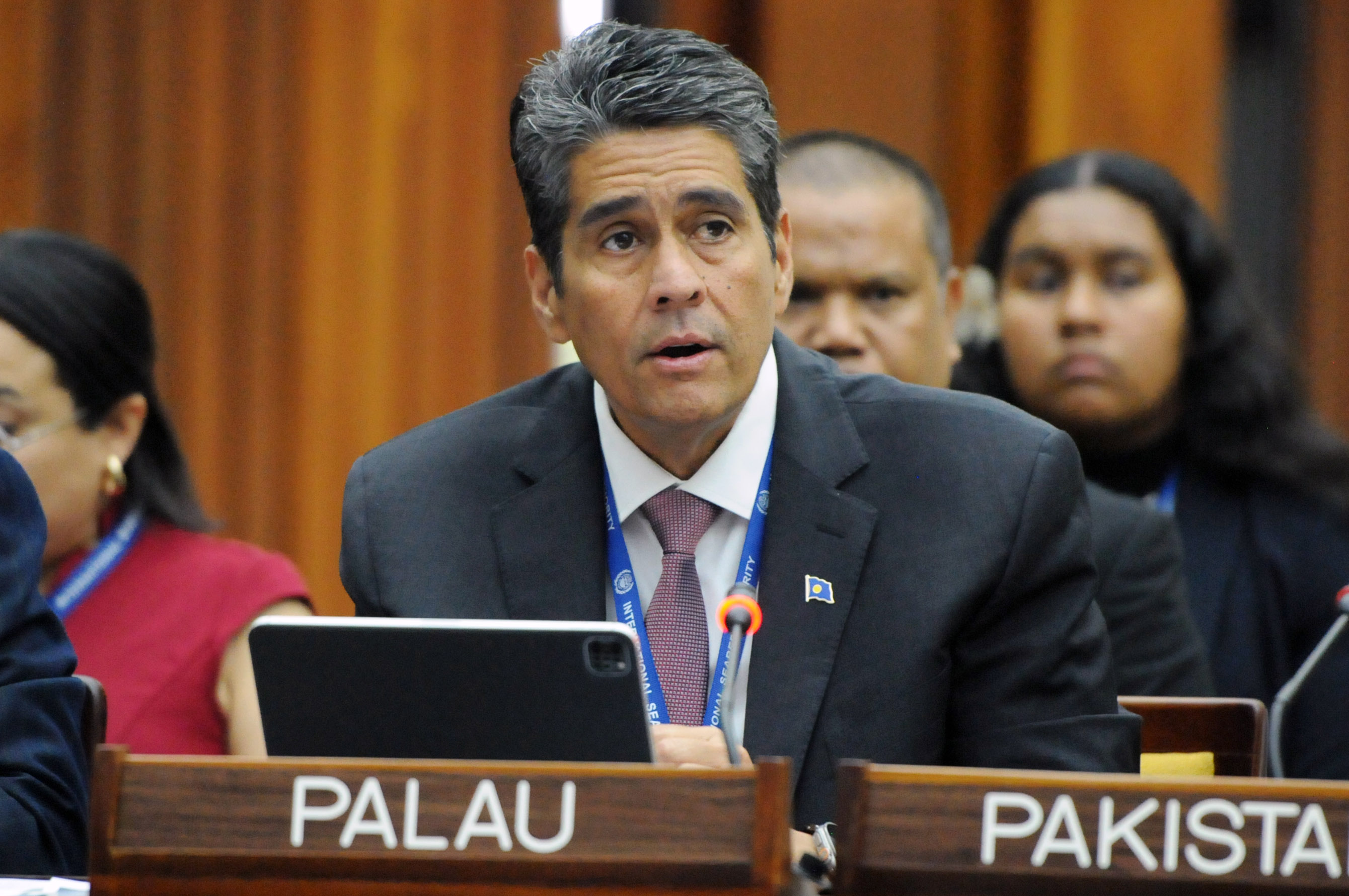
President Surangel S. Whipps Jr. delivering the speech at the 29th General Assembly of the International Seabed Authority in Kingston, Jamaica

"Upholding the Common Heritage of Humankind" is the title of a speech delivered to the International Seabed Authority Assembly on July 29, 2024, by President Surangel S. Whipps Jr. of Palau. In his speech, Whipps emphasized the historical significance of 1994 as a date marking both Palauan independence and the ratification of the United Nations Convention on the Law of the Sea.

Whipps highlighted Palau's commitment to protecting its ocean from exploitation, likening the current threat of deep-sea mining to a new form of colonialism. He underscored Palau's deep cultural connection to the ocean and the crucial responsibility of sovereign nations to safeguard the marine environment. Whipps advocated for a moratorium on deep-sea mining, invoking the traditional Palauan practice of bul, which emphasizes ecosystem management and resource regeneration. He stressed the importance of traditional and Indigenous knowledge in preserving the ocean's health and commended the efforts of Pacific Indigenous representatives and the Federated States of Micronesia in highlighting the cultural significance of the ocean. Whipps also urged the assembly to engage in broad consultations with traditional communities to protect these valuable areas.

== Background ==
Whipps followed in the footsteps of Arvid Pardo, a Maltese diplomat renowned for his influential role in promoting the legal concept of common heritage of mankind. This principle emerged from Pardo's landmark speech to the United Nations General Assembly on November 1, 1967. Pardo argued that the seabed and ocean floor, along with their resources, lay beyond national jurisdiction and should be considered the common heritage of mankind. He stressed that these areas should not be subject to national appropriation or exploitation by individual countries or corporations but should be managed for the benefit of all humanity.

Pardo's advocacy significantly influenced the formulation of the United Nations Convention on the Law of the Sea (UNCLOS). The UNCLOS, adopted in 1982, incorporates the concept of the common heritage of mankind, particularly in its provisions concerning the deep seabed. It established the International Seabed Authority (ISA) to regulate activities in the seabed beyond national jurisdiction, ensuring that the exploration and use of marine resources are conducted for the benefit of all countries, especially developing nations.

=== Palau and Fiji Call for Deep-Sea Mining Moratorium ===
On June 27, 2022, during the UN Ocean Conference in Lisbon, Palau and Fiji launched an alliance advocating for a moratorium on deep-sea mining due to its potential risks to ocean biodiversity. Palauan President Surangel S. Whipps Jr. highlighted the dangers of deep-sea mining, which involves extracting mineral-rich nodules from the ocean floor, and questioned the wisdom of pursuing such activities without fully understanding the environmental consequences. This initiative by Palau and Fiji reflects broader global concerns, with nations like Chile also advocating for a pause on deep-sea mining due to scientific uncertainties.

== Speech ==
In his speech, Whipps challenged the claims of the deep-sea mining industry, pointing out that viable alternatives exist that do not involve the destruction of the ocean floor. He emphasized the unknown consequences of disturbing the deep seabed, such as disrupting carbon sequestration and affecting migratory fish stocks, which are vital for Palau's economy and food security. He called for a precautionary approach, prioritizing long-term sustainability over short-term economic gains.

Addressing the ISA, President Surangel Whipps Jr. of Palau said, "Let us not leave Jamaica having granted the mining industry a license to colonize the common heritage of humankind and destroy our greatest ally in our fight against climate change—our ocean." He cited the example of Palau in the 1970s, when a proposal to construct a large port and oil storage facility on the island was presented. Although the project promised considerable economic benefits, it was ultimately rejected due to concerns over its potential environmental impact.

Whipps concluded by reflecting on the legacy we leave for future generations, invoking Palauan culture's emphasis on the health of the land and ocean. He called for the ISA to uphold the principles of UNCLOS and transform into a body that truly protects the ocean as the common heritage of humankind. Whipps urged unity in championing a moratorium on deep-sea mining, highlighting the need for science-backed decisions to ensure a healthy ocean for future generations.

== Impact and reactions ==
During the ISA assembly the momentum has grown significantly for the protection of oceans against deep-sea mining. As of August 2024, 32 nations have called for a halt to the commencement of deep-sea mining. During the International Seabed Authority negotiations in Kingston, Jamaica, five new nations—Tuvalu, Austria, Honduras, Guatemala, and Malta—joined this growing coalition, bringing the total to 32 nations from the Pacific, Europe, the Caribbean, and Latin America advocating for a precautionary pause or moratorium.
