= Leticia Carvalho =

Brazilian oceanographer (born 1973)

Leticia Reis de Carvalho
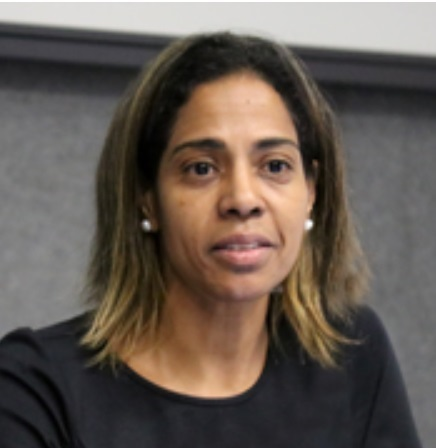
- Carvalho in 2018

Secretary-General of the International Seabed Authority
- Incumbent
- Assumed office 1 January 2025
- Preceded by: Michael Lodge (United Kingdom)

Personal details
- Born: 1973 (age 52–53) Rio de Janeiro, Brazil
- Education: Federal University of Rio Grande do Sul, University of Brasília

Leticia Reis de Carvalho (born 1973) is a Brazilian oceanographer who has served as Secretary-General of the International Seabed Authority since 1 January 2025.

== Early life and education ==
Born in Rio de Janeiro, in 1973, Carvalho grew up in Brasília. She studied oceanography at the Federal University of Rio Grande do Sul and obtained a Master's degree in sustainable development from the University of Brasília.

== Career ==
Carvalho began working at the Ministry of the Environment of Brazil in 2001, and in 2013 became Director of Environmental Quality in Industry. She has also worked for the United Nations Environment Programme in the Latin America and Caribbean region.

In August 2024, Carvalho was elected to succeed Michael Lodge as Secretary-General of the International Seabed Authority for a four-year term beginning on 1 January 2025.
