= Marisa von Bülow =

Brazilian political scientist

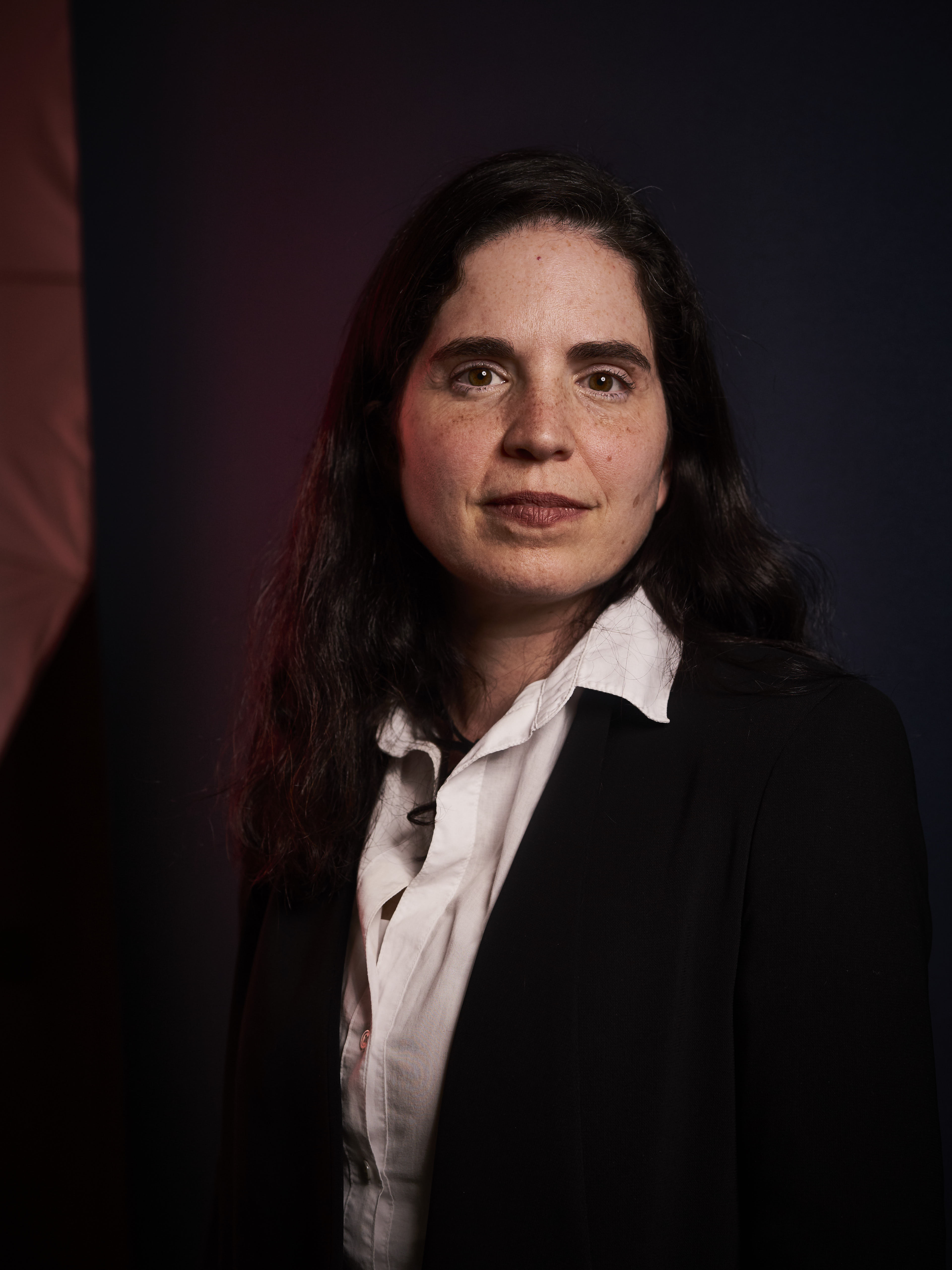
- Awards: Luciano Tomassini Award
- Scientific career
- Fields: Political science; Sociology; International political economy
- Institutions: University of Brasília

Marisa von Bülow is a Brazilian political scientist and sociologist. She is a professor in the Political Science Institute at the University of Brasília. She studies networks in international trade, the theory of social movements, and the collective action problems that confront international organizations.

== Career ==
In 2006, von Bülow published the book Building Transnational Networks: Civil Society and the Politics of Trade in the Americas. In Building Transnational Networks, von Bülow studies the growing prominence of civil society organizations and nongovernmental organizations in trade policy debates in the Americas, particularly in challenging free trade agreements. She uses these debates to conduct a network analysis on civil society organizations in Brazil, Chile, Mexico, and the United States, to understand how these organizations decide to build both domestic and international ties. Von Bülow is concerned not just with the relationship between organizations, but with the relationship between those organizations and their environments. She also studies the implications of these relationships for the networks of trade between countries, and shows how international ties between civil society organizations often arise from the domestic politics of their country. For Building Transnational Networks, von Bülow won the 2012 Luciano Tomassini Latin American International Relations Book Award, which is presented each year by the Latin American Studies Association to "the author(s) of an outstanding book on Latin American foreign policies and international relations".

Together with Federico M. Rossi, von Bülow edited the 2017 book Social Movement Dynamics: New Perspectives on Theory and Research from Latin America. The book studies the applicability of traditional social movement theory, which was typically elaborated in the context of 1980s American sociology, to the rapidly changing social movements of contemporary South America. In 2017 she also edited the volume Social Movements in Chile: Organization, Trajectories, and Political Consequences, together with Sofia Donoso. In addition to publishing books and academic journal articles, Von Bülow has coauthored policy reports, and was a coauthor of the 2001 World Bank report Civil society participation in the pilot program to conserve the Brazilian rain forest.

During the 2019–2020 academic year, von Bülow held a visiting position at the German Institute for Global and Area Studies.

Von Bülow has published articles in popular media outlets including El País and HuffPost, and her work has been cited or she has been interviewed in outlets including Universo Online, DW News, GP1, TVI 24, Observador, and the senate news agency Agência Senado (Pt).

== Selected works ==
- Building Transnational Networks: Civil Society and the Politics of Trade in the Americas (2006)
- Social Movement Dynamics: New Perspectives on Theory and Research from Latin America, editor, with Federico M. Rossi (2017)
- Social Movements in Chile: Organization, Trajectories, and Political Consequences, editor, with Sofia Donoso (2017)

== Selected awards ==
- Luciano Tomassini Award, Latin American Studies Association (2012)
