= International Seabed Authority =

Intergovernmental body to regulate mineral-related activities on the seabed

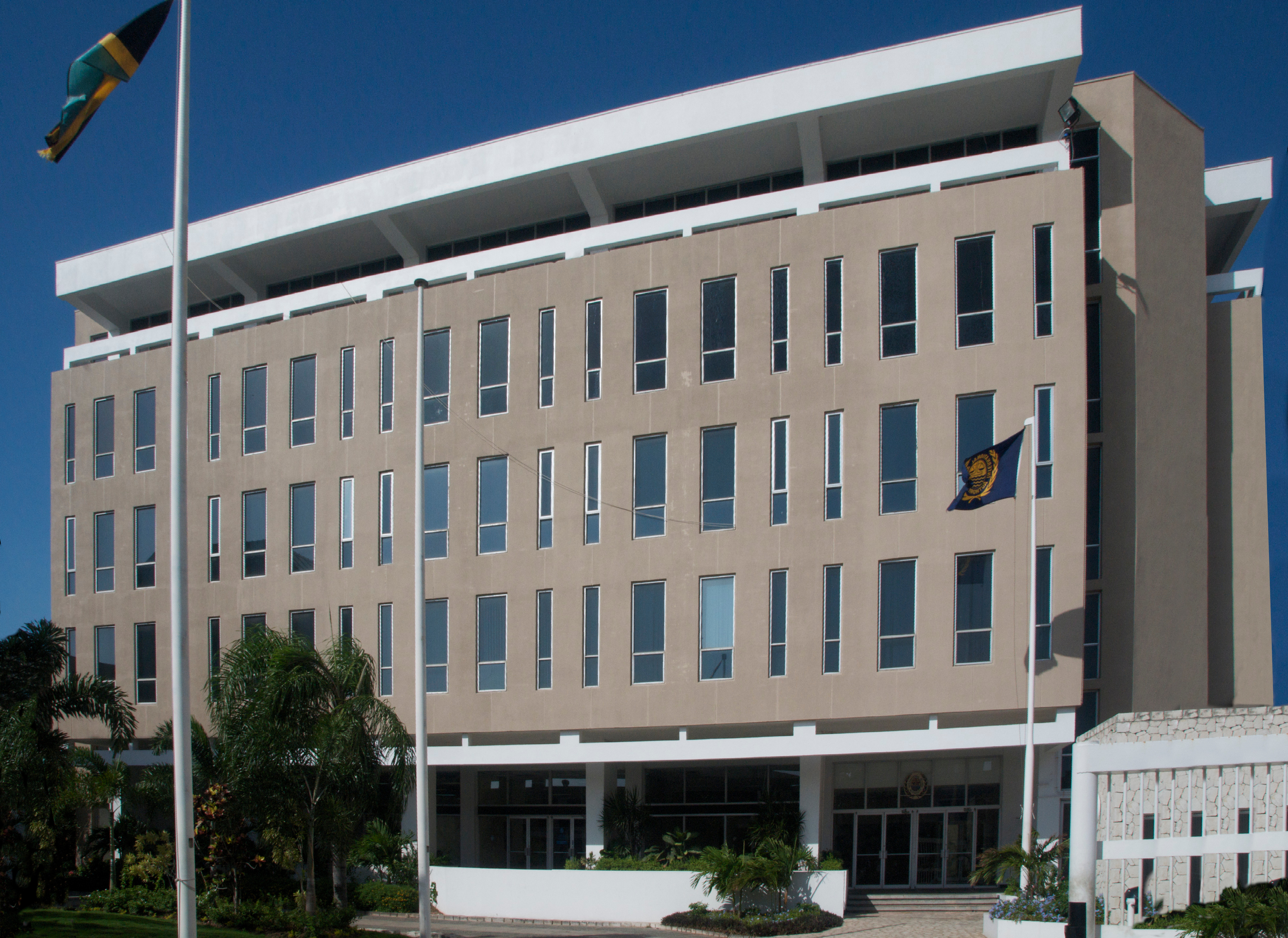
- ISA Headquarters
- Abbreviation: ISA
- Formation: 16 November 1994; 31 years ago
- Type: Intergovernmental organization
- Purpose: Regulate deep seabed mining and ensure the marine environment is protected from any harmful effects which may arise from mining activities
- Headquarters: Kingston, Jamaica
- Coordinates: 17.9647°N 76.7917°W
- Members: 172 states parties (2018)
- Secretary-General: Leticia Carvalho
- Main organ: Assembly of the International Seabed Authority
- Affiliations: Observer to the United Nations General Assembly
- Budget: $17.1 Million (2017 & 2018)
- Website: isa.org.jm

The International Seabed Authority (ISA; French: Autorité internationale des fonds marins) is a Kingston, Jamaica-based intergovernmental body of 171 member states plus the European Union. It was established under the 1982 UN Convention on the Law of the Sea (UNCLOS) and its 1994 Agreement on Implementation. The ISA's dual mission is to authorize and control the development of mineral related operations in the international seabed, which is considered the "common heritage of all mankind", and to protect the ecosystem of the seabed, ocean floor and subsoil in "The Area" beyond national jurisdiction. The ISA is responsible for safeguarding the international deep sea, defined as waters below 200 meters (656 feet), where photosynthesis is hampered by inadequate light. Governing approximately half of the total area of the world's oceans, the ISA oversees activities that might threaten biological diversity and harm the marine environment.

Since its inception in 1994, the ISA has approved over two dozen ocean floor mining exploration contracts in the Atlantic, Pacific and Indian Oceans. The majority of these contracts are for exploration in the Clarion–Clipperton zone between Hawaii and Mexico, where polymetallic nodules contain copper, cobalt and other minerals essential for powering electric batteries. To date, the Authority has not authorized any commercial mining contracts as it continues to deliberate over regulations amid global calls for a moratorium on deep sea mining. Scientists and environmentalists warn that such mining could wreak havoc on the ocean, a crucial carbon sink and home to rare and diverse species.

Funded by UNCLOS members and mining contractors, the Authority operates as an autonomous international organization with its own Assembly, Council, and Secretariat. The current secretary-general of the agency is Leticia Carvalho, whose four-year term began on 1 January 2025.

== Origin ==
The Authority held its inaugural meeting in its host country, Jamaica, on 16 November 1994, the day the Convention came into force. The articles governing the Authority have been made "noting the political and economic changes, including market-oriented approaches, affecting the implementation" of the convention. The Authority obtained its observer status to the United Nations in October 1996. The Authority has 167 members and the European Union, composed of all parties to the United Nations Convention on the Law of the Sea. The Authority operates by contracting with private and public corporations and other entities authorizing them to explore, and potentially exploit, specified areas on the deep seabed for mineral resources, such as cobalt, nickel and manganese.

=== "Common Heritage of All Mankind" ===
Under UNCLOS, Part XI, Section 2. "The Area and its resources are the common heritage of mankind." As a result, ISA must ensure that activities in the Area are undertaken only for peaceful purposes and for the benefit of all humankind, with economic benefits shared equitably and special consideration given to the needs of developing nations.

=== Governance and operations ===
Along with a Secretary-General, two principal organs establish the policies and govern the work of the Authority: the Assembly, in which all UNCLOS parties are represented, and a 36-member Council elected by the Assembly.

==== Secretary-General ====
The Assembly elects a Secretary-General to serve a four-year term as the ISA's chief administrative officer, oversee Authority staff and issue an annual report to the Assembly. The Secretary-General is prohibited from holding a financial interest in any mining operations authorized by the Authority.

There have been four Secretaries-General since ISA's creation in 1996:

Country	Image	Name	Term
Fiji		Satya Nandan	1996–2008
Ghana		Nii Allotey Odunton	2008−2016
United Kingdom		Michael Lodge	2016–2024
Brazil		Leticia Carvalho	2025–

==== Assembly ====
The Assembly, which consists of all members of the Authority, elects the 36-member Council, as well as the Secretary-General from among candidates the Council recommends. The Assembly also has the power to approve or reject the council's recommendations for the following: rules and regulations governing seabed mining, distribution of financial benefits accrued from authorized mining and the Authority's annual budget.

==== Council ====
The 36-member Council, elected by the Assembly, authorizes contracts with governments and private corporations to explore and mine the international seabed and sets rules and procedures, subject to the Assembly's approval, for ISA governance. The council also nominates a Secretary-General, who then must be elected by the full Assembly to serve a four-year term. The ISA's annual plenary sessions, which usually last two weeks, are held in Kingston.

==== Advisory bodies ====
Also established is a 30-member Legal and Technical Commission which advises the Council and a 15-member Finance Committee that deals with budgetary and related matters. All members are experts nominated by governments and elected to serve in their individual capacity.

==== Enterprise ====
The convention also established a body called the Enterprise which is to serve as the Authority's own mining operator, potentially generating "hundreds of millions of dollars in royalties" to be shared with developing nations." The environmental organization Greenpeace has expressed concerns over the ISA's alleged conflict of interest as both regulator and business operator, though the ISA denies the conflict of interest charge.

== Status ==
The Authority has a Secretariat of 37 authorized posts and a 2022 biennial budget of approximately $10,000,000.

== Jurisdiction ==
UNCLOS defines the international seabed area—the part under ISA jurisdiction—as "the seabed and ocean floor and the subsoil thereof, beyond the limits of national jurisdiction" UNCLOS outlines the areas of national jurisdiction as a "12 nautical-mile territorial sea; an exclusive economic zone of up to 200 nautical miles and a continental shelf", unless a nation can demonstrate that its continental shelf is naturally prolonged beyond that limit, in which case it may claim up to 350 nautical miles (650 km). ISA has no role in determining this boundary. Rather, this task is left to another body established by UNCLOS, the Commission on the Limits of the Continental Shelf, which examines scientific data submitted by coastal states that claim a broader reach.

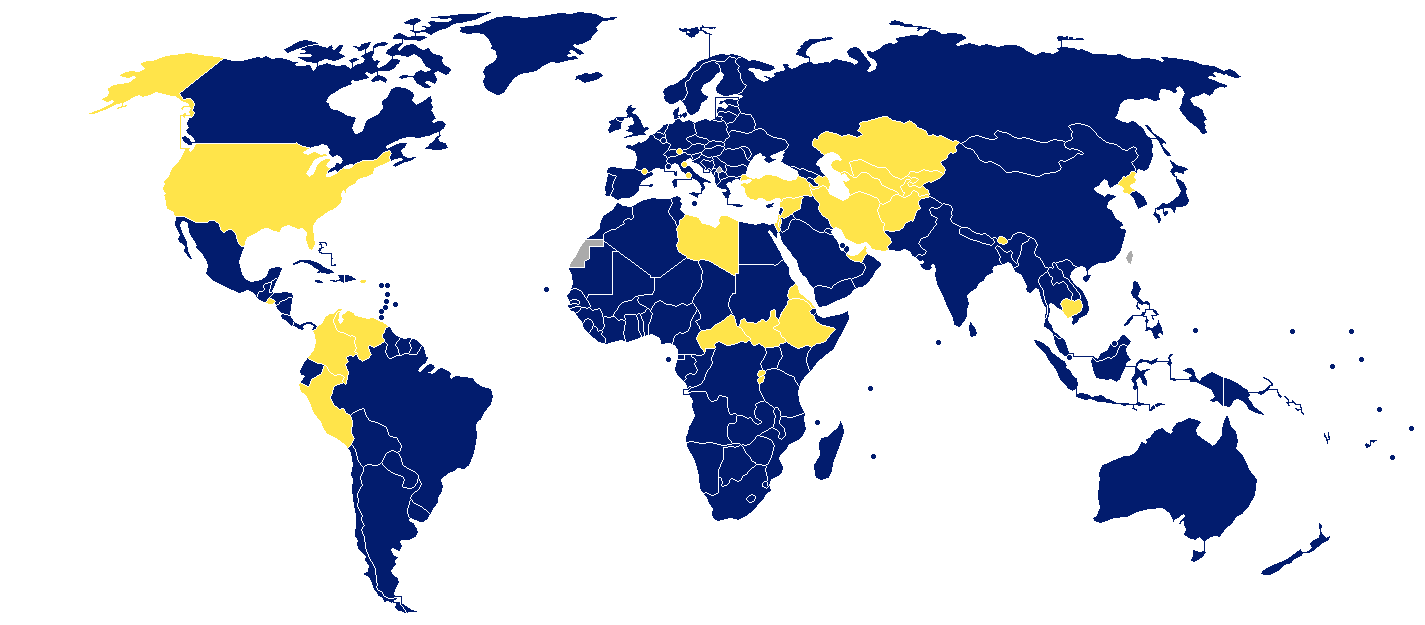
Member states represented in blue; observer states in yellow (note: the European Union also holds membership)

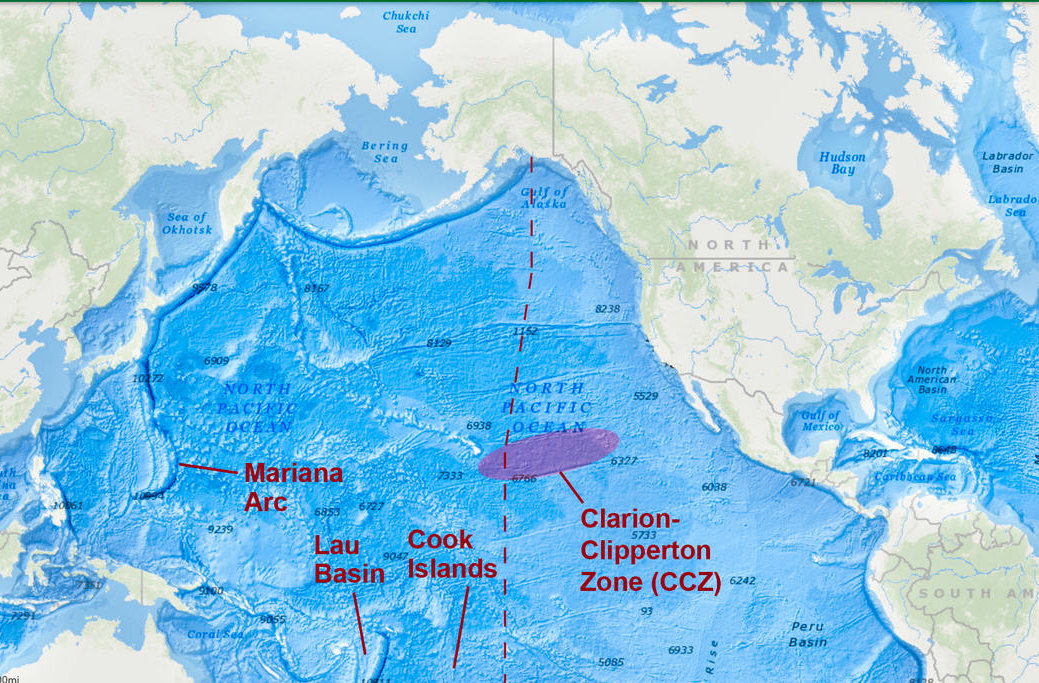
Clarion–Clipperton zone, 1.7 million square miles between Hawaii and Mexico, known for ocean floor nodules of cobalt, nickel, manganese and copper, as well as unusual species

== Exploration contracts and commercial mining ==
=== Commercial ===
Although the ISA has yet to approve commercial mining contracts, the Authority anticipates commercial mining could begin as early as 2023–2024 with the completion of much-debated ISA regulations. In 2021, the Pacific Island nation of Nauru triggered a deadline that requires the ISA to approve final commercial mining regulations by July 2023 or allow contractors to mine under existing draft regulations.

=== Exploratory ===
Exploratory mining involves "deep-sea mapping, manned submersibles or remotely-operated vehicles, photographic and video systems, and drilling devices."

==== Clarion–Clipperton zone ====
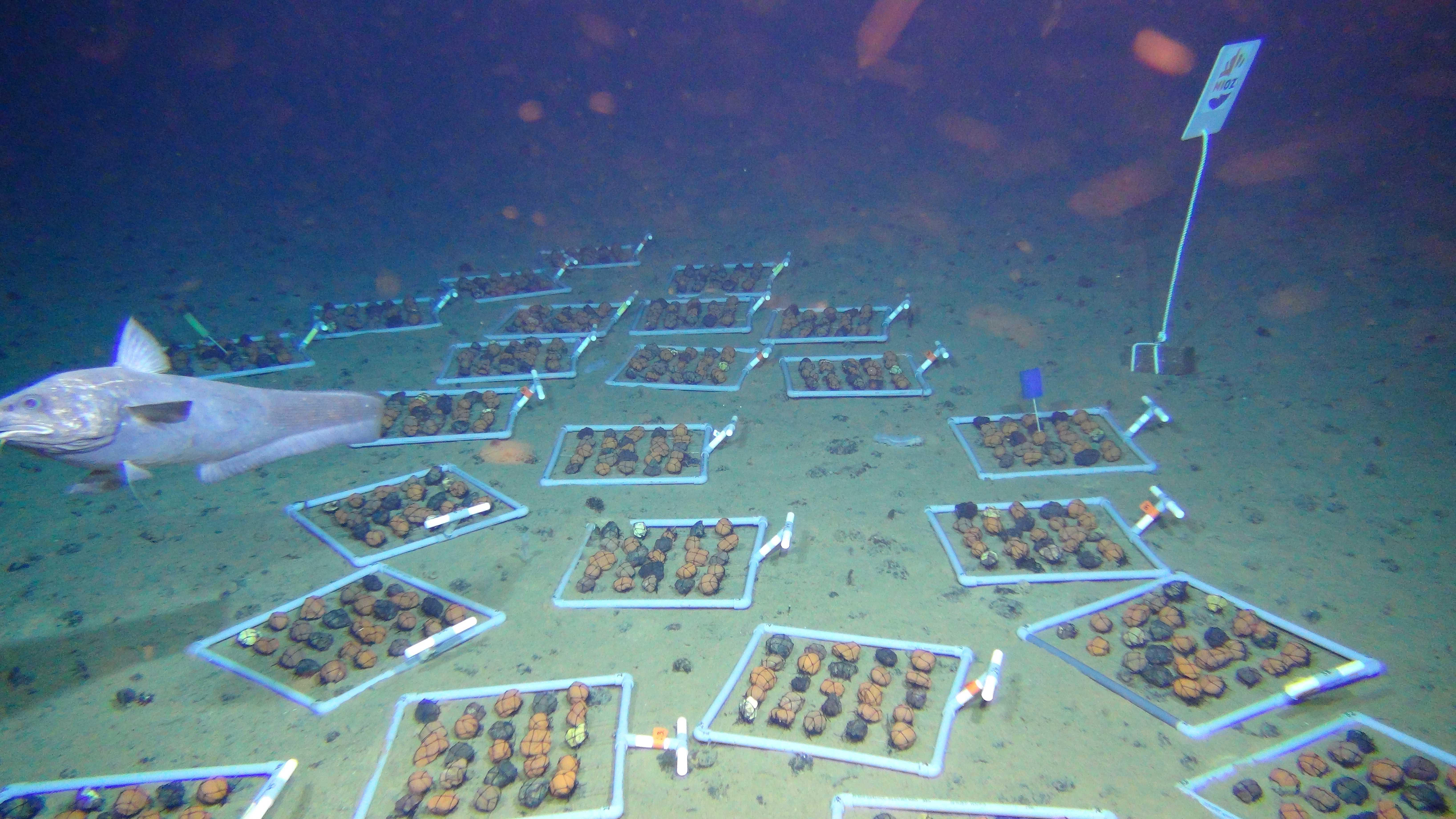
Investigation into manganese nodule mining on the seabed in the Clarion–Clipperton zone

Most areas of exploration are in the Clarion–Clipperton zone (CCZ), in the Equatorial North Pacific Ocean, south and southeast of Hawaii, between Hawaii and Mexico. The quiet CCZ, as wide as the continental U.S., is home to polymetallic nodules or trillions of potato-size lumps of matter formed over millions of years that contain nickel, manganese, copper, zinc and cobalt, as well as deep water coral, sponges and unusual species ("ghost octopus", crustaceans, worms and sea cucumbers) that in a near light-less environment attach to the rock-like nodules for shelter. Contractors want to mine polymetallic nodules for battery storage for electric vehicles, smartphones, and solar and wind energy.

==== Other areas of exploration ====
Exploration contracts for polymetallic nodules have also been issued for contractors operating in the Central Indian Ocean Basin and Western Pacific Ocean. The ISA has issued exploration contracts for polymetallic sulphides in the South West Indian Ridge, Central Indian Ridge and the Mid-Atlantic Ridge, and contracts for exploration for cobalt-rich crusts in the Western Pacific Ocean.

==== Requirements of contractors ====
Each contractor is required to develop a contingency plan should something go wrong during exploration, report annually on its activities in its assigned area and propose a training program for developing countries .

==== List of exploratory contractors ====
The ISA has signed 15-year contracts for exploration with 22 contractors seeking polymetallic nodules, polymetallic sulphides and cobalt-rich ferromanganese crusts in the deep seabed.

In 2001-2002 the ISA signed contracts with Yuzhmorgeologya (Russian Federation); Interoceanmetal Joint Organization (IOM) (Bulgaria, Cuba, Slovakia, Czech Republic, Poland and Russian Federation); the Government of the Republic of Korea; China Ocean Minerals Research and Development Association (COMRA) (China); Deep Ocean Resources Development Company (DORD) (Japan); Institut français de recherche pour l’exploitation de la mer (IFREMER) (France); the Government of India. In 2006, the Authority signed a 15-year contract with the Federal Institute for Geosciences and Natural Resources of Germany.

In 2008, the Authority received two new applications for authorization to explore for polymetallic nodules, coming for the first time from private firms in developing island nations of the Pacific. Sponsored by their respective governments, they were submitted by Nauru Ocean Resources Inc. and Tonga Offshore Mining Limited. A 15-year exploration contract was granted by the Authority to Nauru Ocean Resources Inc. on 22 July 2011 and to Tonga Offshore Mining Limited on 12 January 2012.

Fifteen-year exploration contracts for polymetallic nodules were also granted to G-TECH Sea Mineral Resources NV (Belgium) on 14 January 2013; Marawa Research and Exploration Ltd (Kiribati) on 19 January 2015; Ocean Mineral Singapore Pte Ltd on 22 January 2015; UK Seabed Resources Ltd (two contracts on 8 February 2013 and 29 March 2016 respectively); Cook Islands Investment Corporation on 15 July 2016 and more recently China Minmetals Corporation on 12 May 2017.

The Authority has signed seven contracts for the exploration for polymetallic sulphides in the South West Indian Ridge, Central Indian Ridge and Mid-Atlantic Ridge with China Ocean Mineral Resources Research and Development Association (18 November 2011); the Government of Russia (29 October 2012); Government of the Republic of Korea (24 June 2014); Institut français de recherche pour l’exploitation de la mer (Ifremer, France, 18 November 2014); the Federal Institute for Geosciences and Natural Resources of Germany (6 May 2015); and the Government of India (26 September 2016) and the Government of the Republic of Poland (12 February 2018).

The Authority holds five contracts for the exploration of cobalt-rich ferromanganese crusts in the Western Pacific Ocean with China Ocean Mineral Resources Research and Development Association (29 April 2014); Japan Oil Gas and Metals National Corporation (JOGMEC, 27 January 2014); Ministry of Natural Resources and Environment of the Russian Federation (10 March 2015), Companhia De Pesquisa de Recursos Minerais (9 November 2015) and the Government of the Republic of Korea (27 March 2018).

== Controversy ==
=== Environmental concerns and climate crisis ===
Environmentalists, scientists from 44 countries, Google, BMW and Volvo, World Wildlife Fund and several Pacific nations, including Fiji and Papua New Guinea, have called for a moratorium on deep-sea mining until more scientific research is conducted on its impact on the marine environment.

Advocates for deep sea mining argue extraction of rare metals is critical for electric car batteries necessary to develop a fossil-free economy.

Opponents argue seabed mining could wreak havoc on the world's oceans, which act as a carbon sink absorbing a quarter of the world's carbon emissions each year.

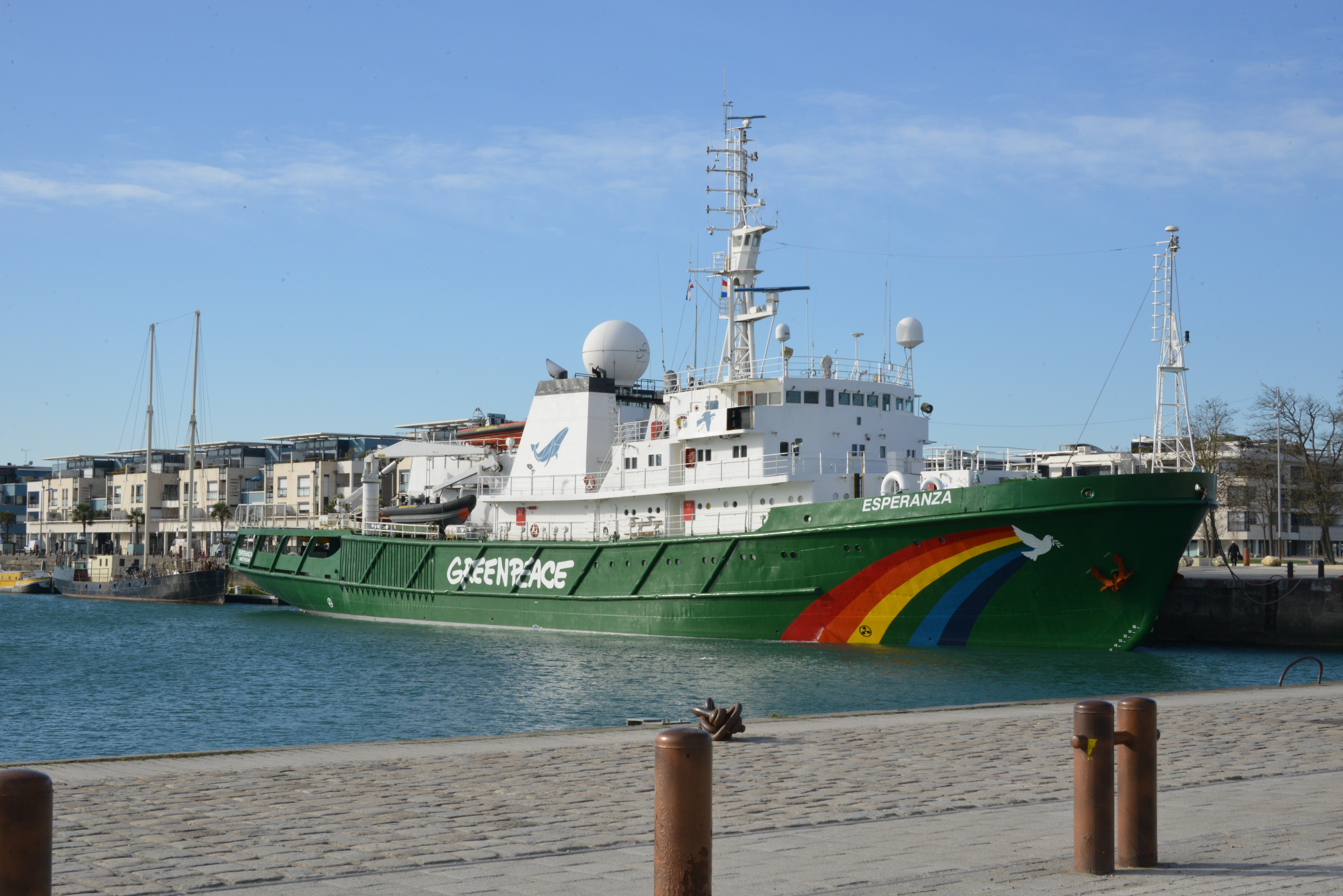
Greenpeace's Esperanza

The environmental organization Greenpeace has raised objections about deep seabed mining disrupting the habitats of newly reported species, from crabs to whales to snails that survive without eating and congregate near bioluminescent thermal vents. Greenpeace has urged the ISA to further develop UNCLOS' foundational Article 136 principle "of common heritage to all mankind" to revise regulations and set conservation targets. In a 2018 Greenpeace Research Laboratories report the organization stressed the importance of protecting marine biodiversity from toxins released during seabed mining for natural gas and rare metals for photovoltaic cells. Greenpeace maintains the "pro-exploitation" ISA is not the appropriate authority to regulate deep sea mining (DSM). In 2019 Greenpeace activists protested outside the annual meeting of the International Seabed Authority in Jamaica, calling for a global ocean treaty to ban deep sea mining in ocean sanctuaries. Some of the activists had sailed to Jamaica aboard Greenpeace's ship, the Esperanza, which travelled from the "Lost City in the mid-Atlantic", an area Greenpeace says is threatened by exploratory mining the ISA authorized.

ISA Secretary-General Michael Lodge said Greenpeace's support for a global ocean treaty, not the ISA, to control deep sea mining did not make sense.

=== Concern over transparency issues ===
In 2022, The Guardian reported the ISA failed to renew the contract for Earth Negotiations Bulletin (ENB), a division of the International Institute for Sustainable Development (IISD), which covered past proceedings to maintain an independent record of the ISA. The decision came amid warnings from scientists that commercial ocean floor mining "would be “dangerous”, “reckless” and “irreversible” in its harm to the ecosystem. In its defense, the ISA said ENB's non-renewal was triggered by budget cuts. The Guardian also reported that Germany and environmentalists had raised questions about the lack of transparency by the ISA's Legal and Technical Commission (LTC), which conducts closed meetings to set standards and issue guidelines for seabed mining.

In response to criticism, ISA Secretary-General Michael Lodge defended ISA as a "transparent public forum of consensus-building."

=== Charges of conflict of interest ===
In 2022, the Los Angeles Times reported that the International Seabed Authority faced criticisms over conflicts of interest. The LA Times reported that the ISA was scheduled to approve seabed mining, despite concerns by scientists and environmentalists about the environmental impact. ISA head Michael Lodge had criticized these groups, saying there was "a growing environmental absolutism and dogmatism bordering on fanaticism" and arguing that seabed mining was "predictable and manageable". Scientists and members of Lodge's staff objected to Lodge's appearance in a mining company video seeking investments in robotic exploration for minerals to manufacture electric vehicles. In the video, Lodge said his agency supported a 15-year exploration contract because "land-based resources are becoming increasingly difficult to access."

=== United States' non-ratification of UNCLOS ===
The exact nature of the ISA's mission and authority has been questioned by opponents of the Law of the Sea Treaty who are generally skeptical of multilateral engagement by the United States. In 2007, although the US Senate Foreign Relations Committee voted in favor of treaty ratification, the full Senate failed to ratify the treaty, with some Republicans arguing UNCLOS might threaten national security by interfering with ocean military operations and hinder seabed mining corporations by imposing environmental regulations.

One of the main anti-ratification arguments being a charge that the ISA is flawed or unnecessary. In its original form, the Convention included certain provisions that some found objectionable, such as:

- Use of collected money for wealth redistribution in addition to ISA administration
- Mandatory technology transfer

Because of these concerns, the United States pushed for modification of the Convention, obtaining a 1994 Agreement on Implementation that somewhat mitigates them and thus modifies the ISA's authority. Despite this change the United States has not ratified the Convention and so is not a member of ISA, although it sends sizable delegations to participate in meetings as an observer.

As an observer, not an UNCLOS signatory, the U.S. will not be allowed to vote on approval of final commercial mining regulations and will be unable to sponsor companies to apply for contracts in international waters. This is because the ISA requires contractors be sponsored by a state that is a signatory to UNCLOS. U.S.-based military contractor Lockheed Martin, however, is participating in two British deep sea mining projects.

=== Palau's advocacy against deep-sea mining ===
Palau was the first country to call for a moratorium, or precautionary pause, on deep-sea mining until the impact of such a practice is better understood. By July 10, 2023, 17 countries had called for a deep-sea mining moratorium or pause, including Germany, New Zealand, Spain, France, Sweden, Fiji, and the Federated States of Micronesia.

On July 29, 2024, President Surangel S. Whipps Jr. of Palau delivered an address titled "Upholding the Common Heritage of Humankind" to the 29th General Assembly of the International Seabed Authority (ISA) in Kingston, Jamaica. In his speech, President Whipps emphasized the importance of safeguarding the deep ocean from exploitation and modern-day colonialism. He highlighted Palau’s deep cultural and economic ties to the ocean and reiterated the call for an immediate moratorium on deep-sea mining, citing the associated environmental risks and uncertainties. In his speech he referred to the ocean as "Our greatest ally in our fight against climate change," highlighting its role as the largest carbon sink on the planet. He underscored the critical role deep ocean ecosystems play in global environmental health and advocated for prioritizing long-term sustainability over short-term economic gains. He urged the assembly to act responsibly on behalf of future generations, reinforcing the deep seabed’s status as the "common heritage of (hu)mankind."

The number of countries against the imminent start of mining for metallic nodules on the seafloor increased to 32 during the 29th ISA annual assembly, with Austria, Guatemala, Honduras, Malta, and Tuvalu joining the list. As of October 2026, a total of 46 sovereign nations have expressed support for a moratorium against the practice, according to the Deep Sea Conservation Coalition.

== 2025 developments: the Mining Code and the United States dispute ==
Tensions between the ISA and the U.S. escalated in 2025 following a series of unilateral actions by the U.S. government and a Canadian-based mining contractor.

=== 30th Session (March 2025) ===
The first part of the ISA's 30th annual session was held at ISA headquarters in Kingston, Jamaica, in March 2025. This was the first meeting under newly elected Council President Duncan Muhumuza Laki (Uganda) and newly appointed Secretary-General Leticia Carvalho. More than 250 delegates and observers, including representatives of all 36 Council members, attended the meetings of the Legal and Technical Commission (LTC) from March 3–14 and the Council from March 17–28, behind closed doors. During the Council meeting, delegates finished the second reading of Draft Exploitation Regulations 1 through 55 of the 107 contained in the consolidated text, which form the basis of the still-unfinished "Mining Code." In accordance with UNCLOS, one of the modifications decided upon at this point was the substitution of the more expansive standard of "harmful effects" for the language on preventing "serious harm" to the marine environment. Just before the session's final day, delegates learned that The Metals Company USA LLC, a subsidiary of The Metals Company, had formally begun the process of applying to the U.S. National Oceanic and Atmospheric Administration for exploration licenses and a commercial recovery permit under the U.S. Deep Seabed Hard Mineral Resources Act of 1980, bypassing the ISA's own regulatory process.

=== U.S. executive order and the NOAA filing ===
Under the Deep Seabed Hard Mineral Resources Act, the order required the Secretary of Commerce, acting through the Administrator of the National Oceanic and Atmospheric Administration (NOAA), to expedite the review and issuance of seabed mineral exploration licenses and commercial recovery permits in areas outside of national jurisdiction within 60 days. The Deep Seabed Hard Mineral Resources Act (DSHMRA) is a U.S. law passed by Congress in 1980. It allows NOAA to grant exploration licenses and commercial recovery permits to U.S. nationals, letting them mine hard mineral resources from the seabed beyond national jurisdiction. Congress conceived it as an interim measure, meant to apply only until an international treaty on deep-sea mining came into force. In 1984, ten years before UNCLOS went into effect, NOAA granted exploration licenses for locations in the Clarion-Clipperton Zone to four U.S.-led mining consortia under DSHMRA. No further licenses were granted for over forty years after that. Only two of the original four, both owned by Lockheed Martin Corporation, were still in operation by 2025.

Five days after the executive order, on 29 April 2025, The Metals Company USA LLC (TMC USA) submitted three DSHMRA applications to NOAA. TMC USA is a U.S. subsidiary of the Canada-based The Metals Company. A commercial recovery permit (TMC USA-A_2) spanning 25,160 square kilometers of the Clarion-Clipperton Zone was one of the applications. The remaining two, TMC USA-A and TMC USA-B, were applications for exploratory licenses that covered a total of 199,895 square kilometers in the same zone. TMC's other subsidiaries already hold exploration contracts with the International Seabed Authority in the same region. These are Nauru Ocean Resources Inc. (NORI), sponsored by Nauru; Tonga Offshore Mining Limited (TOML), sponsored by Tonga; and Marawa Research and Exploration, sponsored by Kiribati. TMC said its NOAA applications targeted areas that overlap with its existing Nauru and Tonga-sponsored contract areas.

=== ISA institutional response ===
On 28 March 2025, the final day of the first part of the 30th session, Secretary-General Leticia Carvalho formally addressed the Council to inform members of The Metals Company's press release announcing that its subsidiary, TMC USA, intended to apply for deep-sea mining permits under U.S. law. She expressed serious concern in her statement, stressing that the Authority has exclusive jurisdiction over all activities in the international seabed area, recognized as the common heritage of humankind under UNCLOS and the 1994 Agreement. She also reaffirmed that any unilateral action outside this framework would violate international law and undermine multilateral governance. The ISA's own press release on the matter records that her remarks "received strong support from numerous delegations," many of which echoed her concerns while reaffirming the Authority's mandate under UNCLOS. Following the U.S. executive order and TMC USA's formal application to NOAA in late April 2025, Carvalho issued another statement as Secretary-General. She described the matter as "a matter of the rule of law within the global ocean governance" framework established by UNCLOS. She stated that no state had the authority to unilaterally exploit the mineral resources of the Area outside of the framework established by UNCLOS, a prohibition she said was understood to bind all states, including those that had not ratified the Convention, and that the order's issuance was "surprising" given that the United States had been "a reliable observer and significant contributor" to the ISA's work for more than 30 years. The ISA separately republished a set of FAQs reiterating that it remained "the only legal authority" to regulate deep-sea mineral activities in international waters, and that any attempt to bypass this process would be a "violation of international law." At the Council session itself, delegations speaking on behalf of the African Group, together with Argentina, the Bahamas, Belgium, Brazil, Cameroon, Chile, China, the Cook Islands, Denmark, Fiji, Germany, India, Indonesia, Italy, Jamaica, Japan, Mauritius, Mexico, the Netherlands, New Zealand, Norway, Poland, the Philippines, Portugal, Russia, Singapore, Spain, roughly forty states in all, stated that they were "working in good faith toward developing a robust regulatory framework for deep-sea mining" and reiterated their strong commitment to UNCLOS, the 1994 Agreement, and the ISA's exclusive mandate over the Area. Ireland, Jamaica, and Singapore specifically rejected the suggestion that the ISA itself was in breach of its obligations under UNCLOS, as TMC's press release had implied. This is separate from the broader, longer-running coalition of states publicly favouring a moratorium or precautionary pause on deep-sea mining generally, which numbered 37 states by the UN Ocean Conference in June 2025 and grew to 38 with Croatia's announcement at the ISA's July Assembly session. Individual governments also issued their own reactions outside the Council chamber. A spokesperson for China's Ministry of Foreign Affairs said the U.S. authorization of seabed mining outside the UNCLOS framework "violates international law and harms the overall interests of the international community." France's Secretary of State for the Sea, Agnès Runacher, criticized TMC's plan on social media shortly after the March announcement.

=== Second part of the 30th session (July 2025) ===
When the Council reconvened in Kingston, Jamaica, for the second part of the 30th annual session on 7 July 2025, it resumed consideration of the draft exploitation regulations from where it had left off in March. Over the following two weeks, delegates completed the second reading of the remaining regulations, 56 through 107, on 17 July 2025, bringing the entire consolidated text of the draft exploitation regulations through two full readings for the first time in the Mining Code's history.

In procedural terms, completing a "second reading" means the Council has reviewed and commented on the entire text of the draft regulations on two separate occasions. Through this, language was refined and some areas of disagreement were narrowed. This does not amount to adoption of the regulations. The text itself remained heavily bracketed, reflecting continuing divergence among Council members on issues including environmental thresholds, the compliance mechanism, benefit-sharing, and underwater cultural heritage. Commentary accompanying the ENB's summary of the session noted that while some delegates saw completion of the second reading as a milestone, others cautioned that it masked limited qualitative progress. It was noted that many controversial clauses had merely been moved into standards and annexes that had not yet been thoroughly examined. The Council decided to pursue a "thematic approach" to the outstanding issues, organized around environmental, financial, regulatory/procedural/institutional, and governance matters, during the intersessional period prior to the 31st session, scheduled for 2026, rather than setting a date for the adoption of the exploitation regulations. The Council also discussed the institutional consequences of the parallel application that TMC USA LLC (TMC USA), a subsidiary of The Metals Company (TMC), submitted to U.S. authorities. TMC's other subsidiary, Nauru Ocean Resources Inc. (NORI), is sponsored by Nauru and has an active ISA exploration contract in the Clarion-Clipperton Zone. Brazil noted that the ISA-30 Council had urged the Secretary-General to investigate whether The Metals Company was breaching its contractual obligations as an ISA licensee during the Assembly session that followed the Council meeting. ISA exploration licenses are held by TMC USA's parent company, The Metals Company, through its subsidiaries. The Council's proposed "compliance committee," which was discussed in draft regulation 102, had at this point only been agreed upon in principle as a future subsidiary body, with the specifics of its establishment left unresolved; this decision did not establish a new, officially named investigative body or mechanism under the exploitation regulations. Instead, it was a request that, in light of the U.S. application, the Secretary-General review the contractor's compliance to its existing exploration contract. Despite the pressure produced by the U.S. process, a number of delegations, including Singapore and Japan, individually underlined that approval of the Mining Code remained the ISA's top institutional objective and a need for exploitation.

The Council also decided to assess, at the end of the 31st session, what further work, if any, would still be needed before a road map to adoption could be established. Discussions were scheduled to continue intersessionally through Friends of the President groups and informal working groups ahead of the 31st session of the ISA Council, with a further revised consolidated text to be prepared by the Secretariat by 1 February 2026. The first part of the 31st session was provisionally scheduled for 16–27 March 2026 in Kingston, Jamaica, with a second part tentatively set for 13–24 July 2026; a proposed third part (28 October–6 November 2026) remained unconfirmed, as several delegations, including Chile, France and Brazil, opposed fixing it in advance, and the March dates themselves were left provisional pending consultations to resolve a scheduling conflict with the BBNJ Preparatory Commission.

== Activities ==
=== Legislative ===
The Authority's main legislative accomplishment has been the adoption, in the year 2000, of regulations governing exploration for polymetallic nodules. These resources, also called manganese nodules, contain varying amounts of manganese, cobalt, copper and nickel. They occur as potato-sized lumps scattered about on the surface of the ocean floor, mainly in the central Pacific Ocean in the Clarion–Clipperton zone but with some deposits in the Indian Ocean.

In 2013, the ISA approved amendments to its mining code on deep sea exploration, stating a prospector should take a precautionary approach to avoid polluting the ocean and should immediately inform the Secretary-General of any prospect-related incidents that threaten the marine environment. The amended regulations also said a contractor can recover "a reasonable amount of material" for testing but not for sale.

In July 2019, the ISA's Legal and Trade Commission prepared "Draft regulations on exploitation of mineral resources in the Area."

In 2010, the ISA adopted Regulations on Prospecting and Exploration for Polymetallic Sulphides.

In 2012, the Authority adopted Regulations on Prospecting and Exploration for Cobalt-Rich Ferromanganese Crusts.

The Council of the Authority began work in August 2002 on another set of regulations, covering polymetallic sulfides and cobalt-rich ferromanganese crusts, which are rich sources of such minerals as copper, iron, zinc, silver and gold, as well as cobalt. The sulphides are found around volcanic hot springs, especially in the western Pacific Ocean, while the crusts occur on oceanic ridges and elsewhere at several locations around the world. The Council decided in 2006 to prepare separate sets of regulations for sulphides and for crusts, with priority given to sulphides. It devoted most of its sessions in 2007 and 2008 to this task, but several issues remained unresolved. Chief among these were the definition and configuration of the area to be allocated to contractors for exploration, the fees to be paid to the Authority and the question of how to deal with any overlapping claims that might arise. Meanwhile, the Legal and Technical Commission reported progress on ferromanganese crusts.

=== Workshops and research ===
In addition to its legislative work, the Authority organizes annual workshops on various aspects of seabed exploration, with emphasis on measures to protect the marine environment from any harmful consequences. It disseminates the results of these meetings through publications. Studies over several years covering the key mineral area of the Central Pacific resulted in a technical study on biodiversity, species ranges and gene flow in the abyssal Pacific nodule province, with emphasis on predicting and managing the impacts of deep seabed mining A workshop at Manoa, Hawaii, in October 2007 produced a rationale and recommendations for the establishment of "preservation reference areas" in the Clarion–Clipperton zone, where nodule mining would be prohibited in order to leave the natural environment intact. In recent years, the ISA hosted workshops on enhancing the role of women in conducting deep-sea scientific studies, sustainable management of deep seabed resources, a series for Africa on resources and technologies for DSM and a session on sharing the economic benefits of DSM.

== National trends in seabed mining ==
In recent years, however, interest in deep sea mining, especially with regard to ferromanganese crusts and polymetallic sulphides, has picked up among several firms now operating in waters within the national zones of Papua New Guinea, Fiji and Tonga. Papua New Guinea was the first country in the world to grant commercial exploration licenses for seafloor massive sulphide deposits when it granted the initial license to Nautilus Minerals in 1997. Japan's new ocean policy emphasizes the need to develop methane hydrate and hydrothermal deposits within Japan's exclusive economic zone and calls for the commercialization of these resources within the next 10 years. Reporting on these developments in his annual report to the Authority in April 2008, Secretary-General Nandan referred also to the upward trend in demand and prices for cobalt, copper, nickel and manganese, the main metals that would be derived from seabed mining, and he noted that technologies being developed for offshore extraction could be adapted for deep sea mining.

Recently, there has been much interest in the possibility of exploiting seabed resources in the Arctic Ocean, bordered by Canada, Denmark, Iceland, Norway, Russia and the United States (see Territorial claims in the Arctic). In 2020, an international coalition of environmental groups urged the government of Norway to not only abandon plans for deep sea mining under national jurisdiction, but to also speak out against DSM Arctic mining before the International Seaboard Authority.

== Endowment fund ==
In 2006 the Authority established an Endowment Fund to Support Collaborative Marine Scientific Research on the International Seabed Area. The Fund will aid experienced scientists and technicians from developing countries to participate in deep-sea research organized by international and national institutions. A campaign was launched in February 2008 to identify participants, establish a network of cooperating bodies and seek outside funds to augment the initial $3 million endowment from the Authority.

== Voluntary commitments ==
In 2017, the Authority registered seven voluntary commitments with the UN Oceans Conference for Sustainable Development Goal 14. These were:

1. OceanAction15467 – Enhancing the role of women in marine scientific research through capacity building
2. OceanAction15796 – Encouraging dissemination of research results through the ISA Secretary-General Award for Excellence in Deep-Sea Research
3. OceanAction16538 – Abyssal Initiative for Blue Growth (with UN-DESA)
4. OceanAction16494 – Fostering cooperation to promote the sustainable development of Africa's deep seabed resources in support of Africas Blue Economy
5. OceanAction17746 – Enhancing the assessment of essential ecological functions of the deep sea oceans through long-term underwater oceanographic observatories in the Area;
6. OceanAction17776 – Enhancing deep sea marine biodiversity assessment through the creation of online taxonomic atlases linked to deep sea mining activities in the Area

== See also ==
- UNCLOS (United Nations Convention on the Law of the Sea)
- Commission on the Limits of the Continental Shelf
- Deep Sea Mining
- Clarion–Clipperton zone
- Polymetallic nodules
- International waters
- Seabed Arms Control Treaty
- United Nations Trusteeship Council
- Antarctic Treaty Secretariat
