= Nii Allotey Odunton =

United Nations official

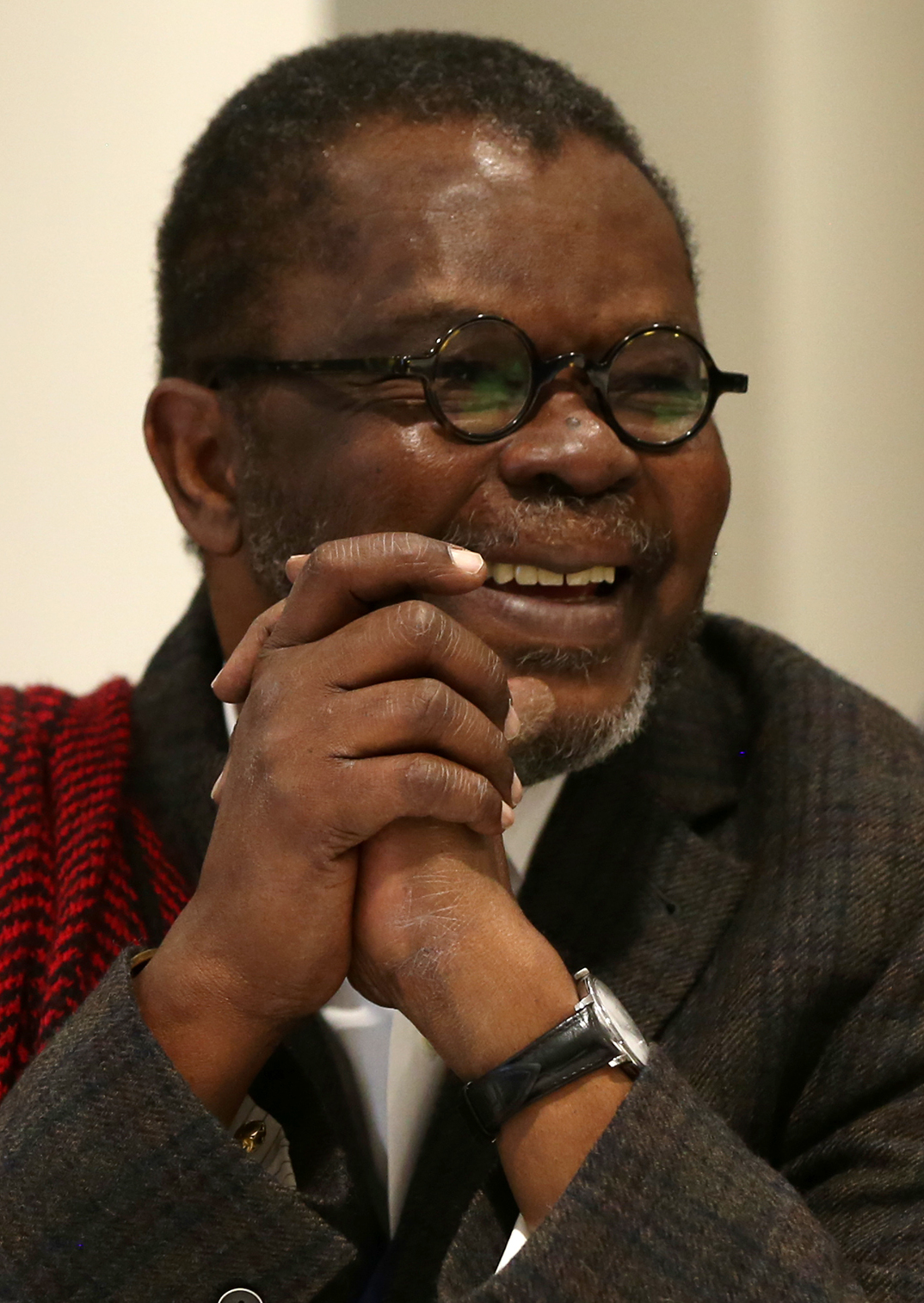
Image of Nii Allotey Odunton

Nii Allotey Odunton, a mining engineer from Ghana, was the Secretary-General of the International Seabed Authority, serving consecutive four-year terms starting in 2009 and ending in 2017.

== Biography ==
Odunton has had more than 20 years of experience in the International Civil Service, with progressively increased responsibilities in marine resource policy formulation, particularly marine mineral resources. Since the establishment of the Authority in 1996 he has concurrently held several positions there at the policy-making level, as Deputy to the Secretary-General, head of the ISA Office of Resources and Environmental Monitoring, Interim Director-General of the Enterprise (the Authority’s seabed mining arm, not yet operational) and Secretary of the Authority’s Assembly. He has conceptualized and convened technical workshops of the Authority, on topics such as deep-seabed polymetallic nodule exploration, the development of environmental guidelines, and proposed technologies for deep-seabed mining of nodules.

He earned a Master of Science degree in Mineral Economics and Mine Finance from the Henry Krumb School of Mines (1974), Columbia University. He then had a brief stint with private industry, spending a year (1974–75) as a Mine Planning Officer with the Bethlehem Steel Corporation at its Rose Mine, Morgantown, Pennsylvania.

=== Career with United Nations ===
Odunton first became associated with the United Nations in 1974, when he and two university colleagues were requested to prepare a paper on resource assessment of the polymetallic nodule deposits in the international sea-bed area to aid the work of the Third United Nations Conference on the Law of the Sea, which was developing an international legal framework for the sea-bed and oceans as a whole. He later helped prepare background papers for the First Committee of the Conference, which elaborated the sea-bed provisions of the United Nations Convention on the Law of the Sea, completed in 1982.

At the United Nations Secretariat in New York he served as an Economic Affairs Officer in its Department of International Economic Social Affairs (1980–1983), where he helped draw up an International Ocean Institute programme on management and use of seabed resources. Odunton subsequently (1984–88) held several other positions in the Department, including Chief of the Mineral Resources Section, Ocean Economics and Technology Branch. As head of this section he was responsible for reports to United Nations meetings on marine mineral resource development.

Odunton was adviser to the Minerals Commission of the government of Ghana (1984–87), providing advice on national minerals policy, a revamping of the national mining code and on investment promotion in the gold sector. He also helped the government with procedural changes in the exploitation and marketing of gold and diamonds.

As work went forward on the establishment of institutions envisaged by the Law of the Sea Convention, Odunton worked in the office of the United Nations Special Representative of the Secretary- General for the Law of the Sea, Satya Nandan. Assigned to the Preparatory Commission for the International Seabed Authority and for the International Tribunal for the Law of the Sea, he served as Deputy Secretary of Special Commission 3 on the mining code for polymetallic nodules and Secretary of Special Commission 2 on the Enterprise.

In 1988, he became the first Officer in charge of the United Nations Office for the Law of the Sea in Kingston, Jamaica, where the Preparatory Commission met and the Seabed Authority was to establish its headquarters. He has been with the Authority continuously since it came into being in 1996. In June 2008 the Assembly of the Authority elected him by acclamation as the second Secretary-General of the Authority, succeeding Satya Nandan.

=== Personal ===
Born on 14 June 1951, Odunton was married to Naa Jama Odunton (deceased) and has four children.
