= Satya Nandan =

Fijian diplomat and lawyer (1936–2020)

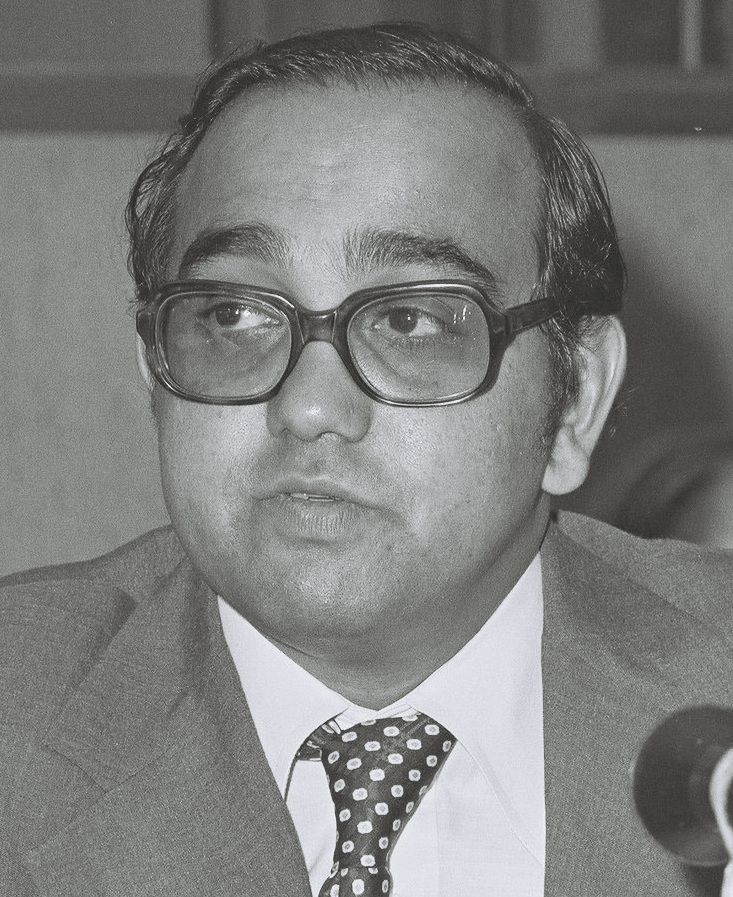
Nandan in 1977

Satya N. Nandan, CF, CBE (July 10, 1936 – February 25, 2020), was a diplomat and lawyer from Fiji specializing in ocean affairs, was Chairman of the Western and Central Pacific Fisheries Commission, where he served a two-year term commencing 1 January 2009. Previously, he was the first Secretary-General of the International Seabed Authority, a position he held for three consecutive four-year terms from March 1996 until December 2008.

Ambassador Nandan was a Fiji Indian who held a law degree from the University of London and was a Barrister-at-Law of Lincoln's Inn, England. He was also a Barrister and Solicitor of the Supreme Court of Fiji. He was a representative of Fiji at the United Nations (1970–76 and 1993–95) and was Fiji's Ambassador to the European Union, Belgium, France, Italy, Luxembourg and the Netherlands (1976-1980). He served as Secretary for Foreign Affairs of Fiji.

== Accomplishments ==
Ambassador Nandan has had an extensive career in international relations, both as representative of his country and head of several intergovernmental bodies. Some of his numerous positions include:

- Representative of Fiji to United Nations committees on decolonization, disarmament, legal and political matters.
- Under-Secretary-General of the United Nations and Special Representative of the Secretary-General for the Law of the Sea (1983-1992).
- Chairman of the United Nations Conference on Straddling Fish Stocks and Highly Migratory Fish Stocks (1993–95).
- Chairman of the Multilateral High Level Conference, which negotiated the Convention on the Conservation and Management of Highly Migratory Fish Stocks in the Western and Central Pacific Ocean (1997-2000).
- President of the meeting of the States Parties to the 1982 United Nations Convention on the Law of the Sea (1994-1996).
- Head of the Fiji delegation to the Seabed Committee of the United Nations (1970-1973) and to the Third United Nations Conference on the Law of the Sea (UNCLOS) (1973-1982).
- Chairman of UNCLOS working groups on the Exclusive Economic Zone, delimitation of maritime boundaries and the high seas (1975).
- Chairman of Negotiating Group 4 of the Conference, which dealt with the participation by landlocked and geographically disadvantaged States in the exploitation of the living resources of the neighbouring exclusive economic zones.
- Chairman of an UNCLOS group on production policy relating to deep seabed mining.
- Chairman of the Group of 77 developing States (1978-1979).
- Chairman of the Committee of Ambassadors of the African, Caribbean and Pacific States (ACP) to the European Economic Community (EEC) in Brussels. He participated in the negotiations for Lome I, II and III Conventions between the ACP Group of States and the EEC.
- General Editor and Co-Author of the Law of the Sea Commentary series ("Virginia Commentary"), published by the Center for Oceans Law and Policy of the University of Virginia School of Law.
- Chairman of the Board of Trustees of the United Nations International School in New York (1996-2001).
- Distinguished Senior Fellow, Center for Oceans Law and Policy, University of Virginia School of Law.
- Distinguished Visitor and Speaker, Centre for International Law, National University of Singapore (March–April 2015).

== Awards ==
Ambassador Nandan was awarded an honorary Doctor of Laws (honoris causa) by Dalhousie University, Halifax, Nova Scotia, Canada (2012), an honorary Doctorate by the University of the South Pacific (1996) and an honorary Doctor of Laws by the Memorial University of Newfoundland, Canada (1995). He was accorded the rank of Commander of the Order of the British Empire (CBE) in 1978 and was awarded Fiji's highest honour, Companion of the Order of Fiji (CF), in 1997. He was honoured with the award of the Grand Cross of the Order of Merit of the Federal Republic of Germany by the President of Germany (1996). He was married and has one son.

== External sources ==
- Satya N. Nandan: Biographical Note. International Seabed Authority, Press Release SB/10/14, 2 June 2004.
- Curriculum Vitae
