= University of Brasília =

Public university in Brasília, Brazil

Coordinates: 15°45′41″S 47°51′59″W

University of Brasilia
- Universidade de Brasília
- Other name: UnB
- Motto: Autonomy
- Type: Public university
- Established: April 21, 1962
- Rector: Rozana Naves
- Faculty: 2,241
- Administrative staff: 2,512
- Undergraduates: 28,570
- Postgraduates: 6,304
- Location: Brasília, Federal District, Brazil
- Campus: Urban, 3,950,579 m^{2} (42,523,680 sq ft)
- Colors: green and blue
- Mascot: The Jabiru
- Website: www.unb.br

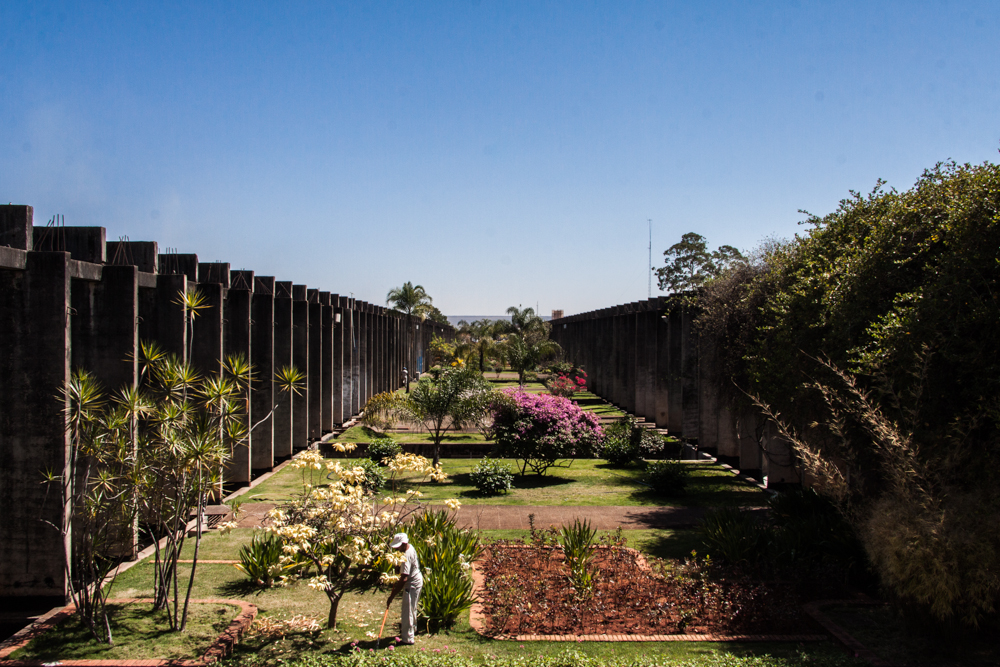
Buildings designed by Oscar Niemeyer at UnB Central Institute of Science.

The University of Brasília (Portuguese: Universidade de Brasília, UnB) is a federal public university in Brasília, the capital of Brazil. It was founded in 1962 and has since consistently been named among the top five Brazilian universities and the top fifteen universities in South America by Times Higher Education (THE).

Created under the utopian vision of educator Anísio Teixeira and anthropology professor Darcy Ribeiro in 1962, the University of Brasília (UnB) is located in the centre of Brazil’s capital city, on the banks of the Paranoá Lake.

There are four campuses: the Darcy Ribeiro campus (regarded as the UnB’s nucleus), the Ceilândia, Gama and Planaltina campuses. Oscar Niemeyer, one of Modernism’s most feted architects, designed UnB’s main building, the Central Institute of Sciences and was also a key player in the university’s founding.

Its strengths lie in its economics, international affairs and political science courses but its general teaching, research and outreach programs have made it one of Brazil’s most well respected universities. Comprising 26 faculties and schools, with 18 specialised research centres, there are over 105 undergraduate programs, some of which are evening or distance learning-based. It also offers 147 graduate degree programs and 22 specialist programs.

UnB also boasts a University Hospital, a veterinary hospital, a restaurant and the Fazenda Água Limpa, a clean water farm just outside Brasilía; where forestry, agricultural and ecological research is undertaken on the university’s behalf.

Relying on exchange programmes and networking with international organisations and post-secondary institutions, UnB administration and the Advisory Committee for International Affairs posted it to the world as one of the best universities in Brazil.

It admits undergraduate and post-graduate students via a yearly entrance exam, known in Brazil as vestibular and through ENEM and is most renowned for its courses in economics, international affairs, law, anthropology, mathematics and political science. Its Central Library is home to Midwestern Brazil's largest archive and is used by research and federal employees from all over the country

UnB offers 114 courses recognized by the Ministry of Education.

== History ==
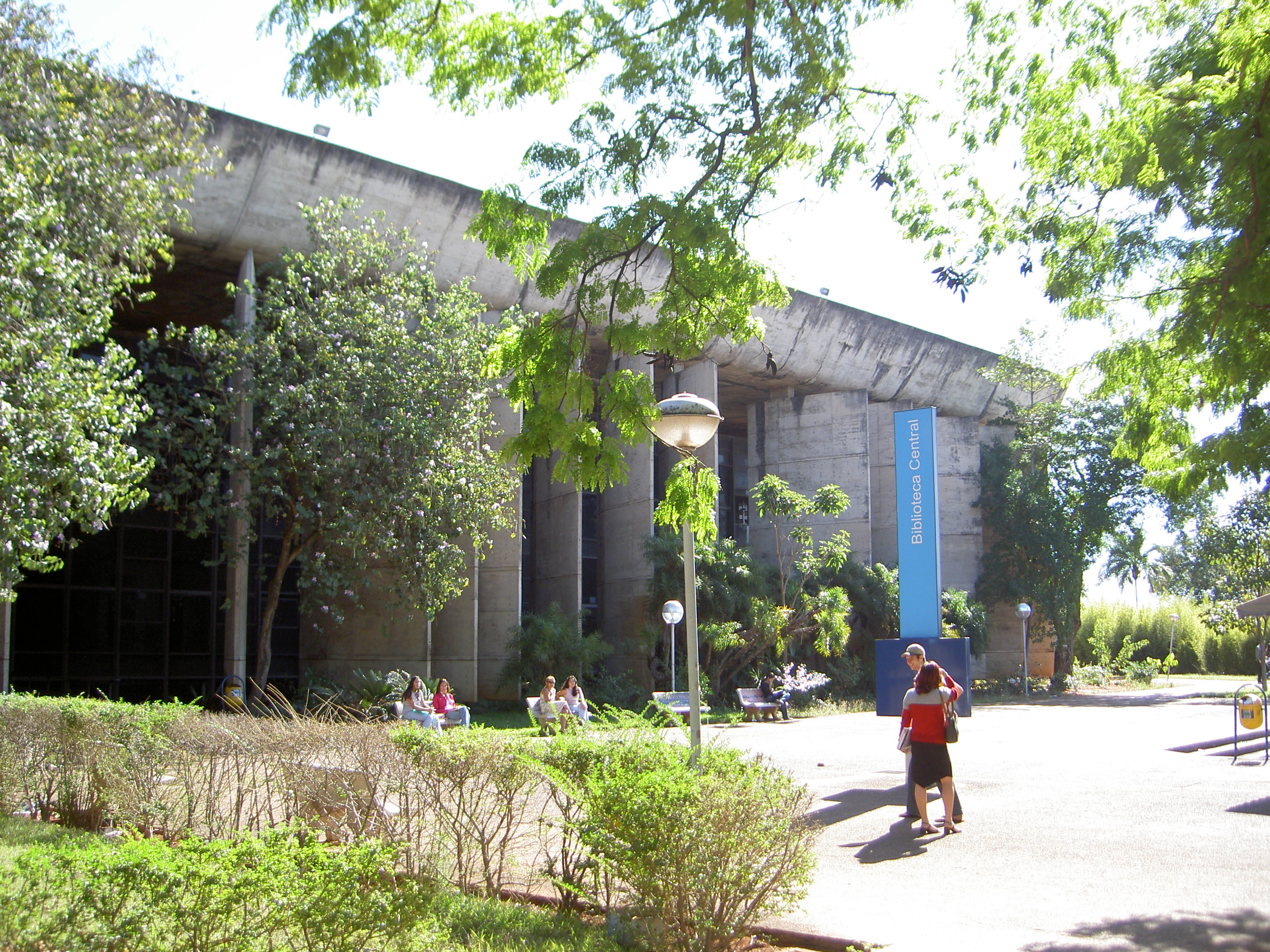
University of Brasília library

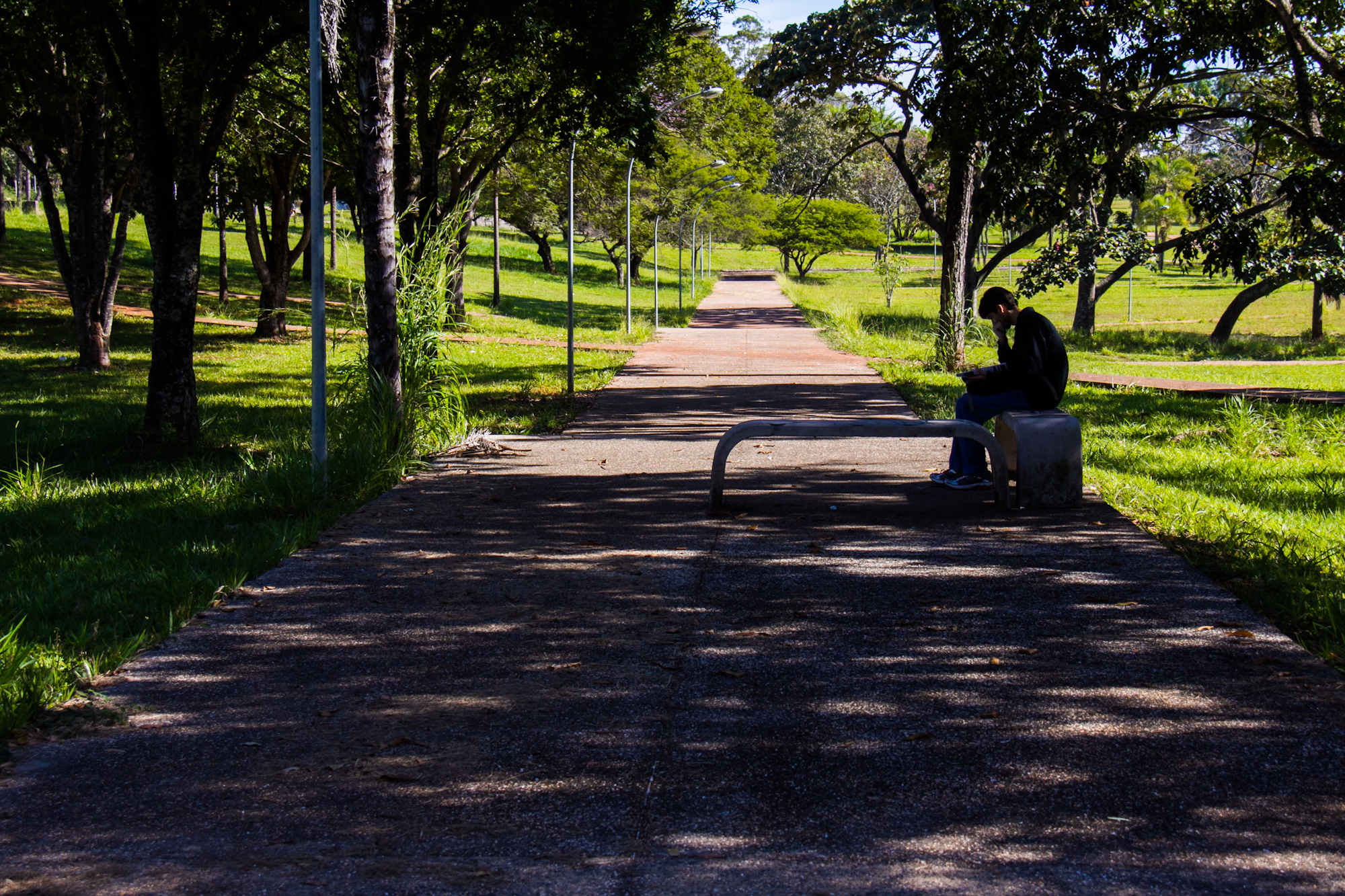
Part of the Darcy Ribeiro campus.

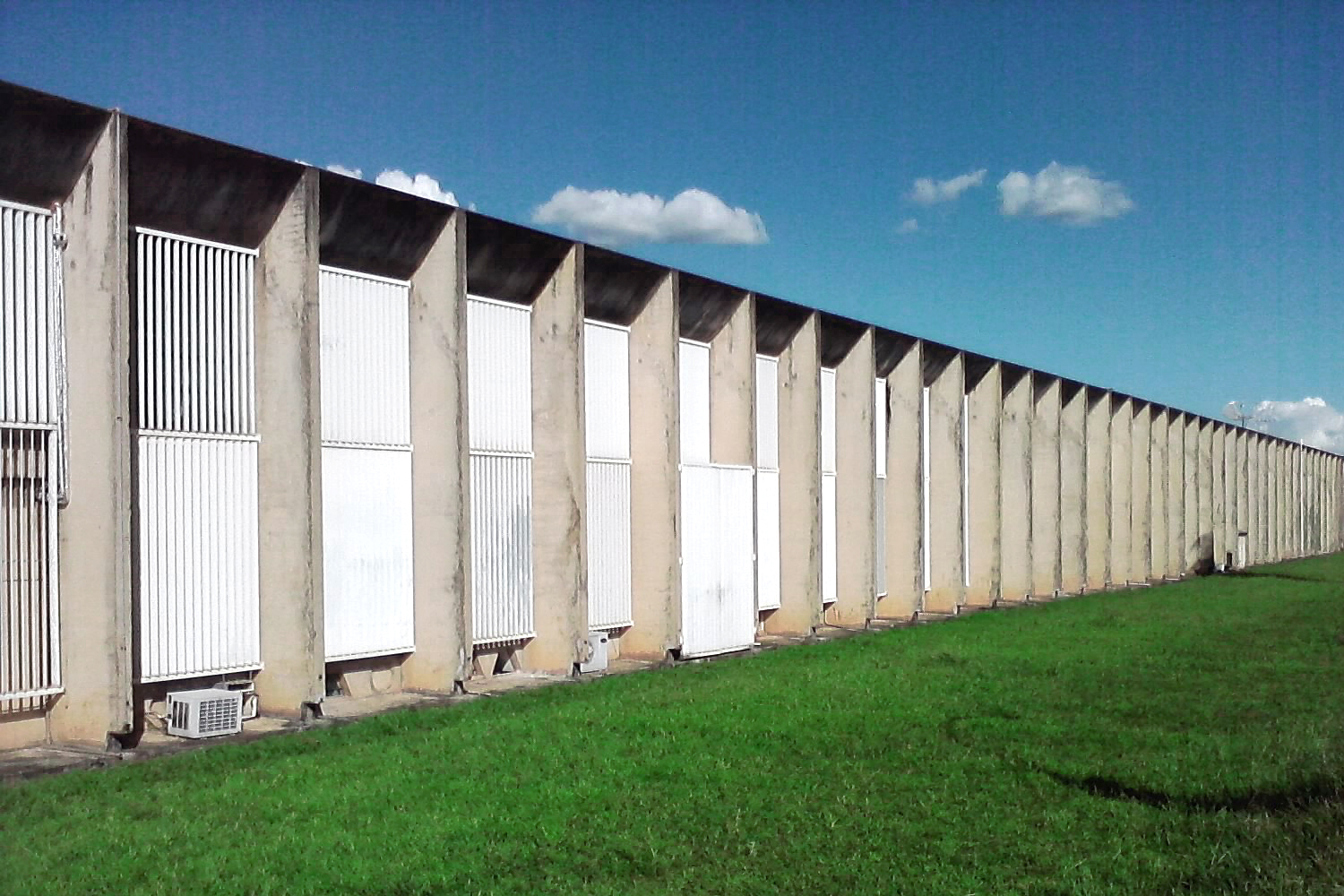
Central Institute of Sciences – ICC ("Minhocão")

The University of Brasília Foundation was founded on December 15, 1961. Professor Darcy Ribeiro, who became its first leader, was one of the most enthusiastic supporters of its creation. Architect Oscar Niemeyer designed its main building, the 700 m long Instituto Central de Ciências (ICC), nicknamed Minhocão.

The institution was created on April 21, 1962 by educator Anísio Teixeira and anthropologist professor Darcy Ribeiro. As of 2010, it employed 1,757 faculty and 2,391 servants, and had over 30,000 graduate and undergraduate students. Each semester, the University of Brasília accepts nearly 2,000 incoming students for its 61 undergraduate programs. On the graduate level, the university offers 49 master's degrees and 27 doctoral programs.

== Academics ==
The university was one of the first in Brazil to admit students via Programa de Avaliação Seriada (PAS), an alternative evaluation which tests high school students once a year bypassing vestibular.

Each semester, the University of Brasília accepts nearly 2,000 incoming students from a pool of approximately 25,000 candidates for its 61 daytime or evening undergraduate programs. At the graduate level, the university offers 56 master's programs and 31 doctorate programs. It also offers advanced non-degree programs, many of them conducted in other Brazilian States, such as Bahia, Amazonas, Rondônia, Goiás and Rio Grande do Norte. The Technological and Scientific Development National Council (CNPq) and the Coordination for the Improvement of Higher Education Personnel (CAPES) support most of these courses, offering scholarships and research grants.

Distance education is an expanding activity in UnB, being managed by the Center for Open, Continuous and Long Distance Education (CEAD) and the School of Education. The United Nations Educational, Social and Cultural Organization (UNESCO) sponsors the Long Distance Education chair at UnB.

== Ranking ==
Several of University of Brasília's graduate programs have been graded 6 and 7 (in a scale from 1 to 7) in the annual CAPES assessment, including its courses in anthropology, mathematics, geology, economics, law, among others. Its programs in economics, international relations and political science are ranked first among public universities in the country.

The University of Brasília has been ranked one of the top five public universities in Brazil by Editora Abril's Guia do Estudante. It ranks eighth in the list of the best universities in the country.

== Campus ==
UnB is located in the Brasília administrative region of the Federal District of Brazil, on the northwestern bank of Paranoá Lake. Most of its buildings were designed in a modernist architecture style.

UnB's Central Library owns the largest archive in Centerwestern Brazil. It maintains a university restaurant, as well as Fazenda Água Limpa, a farm in the outskirts of the Federal District where ecological, agricultural and forestry research is conducted.

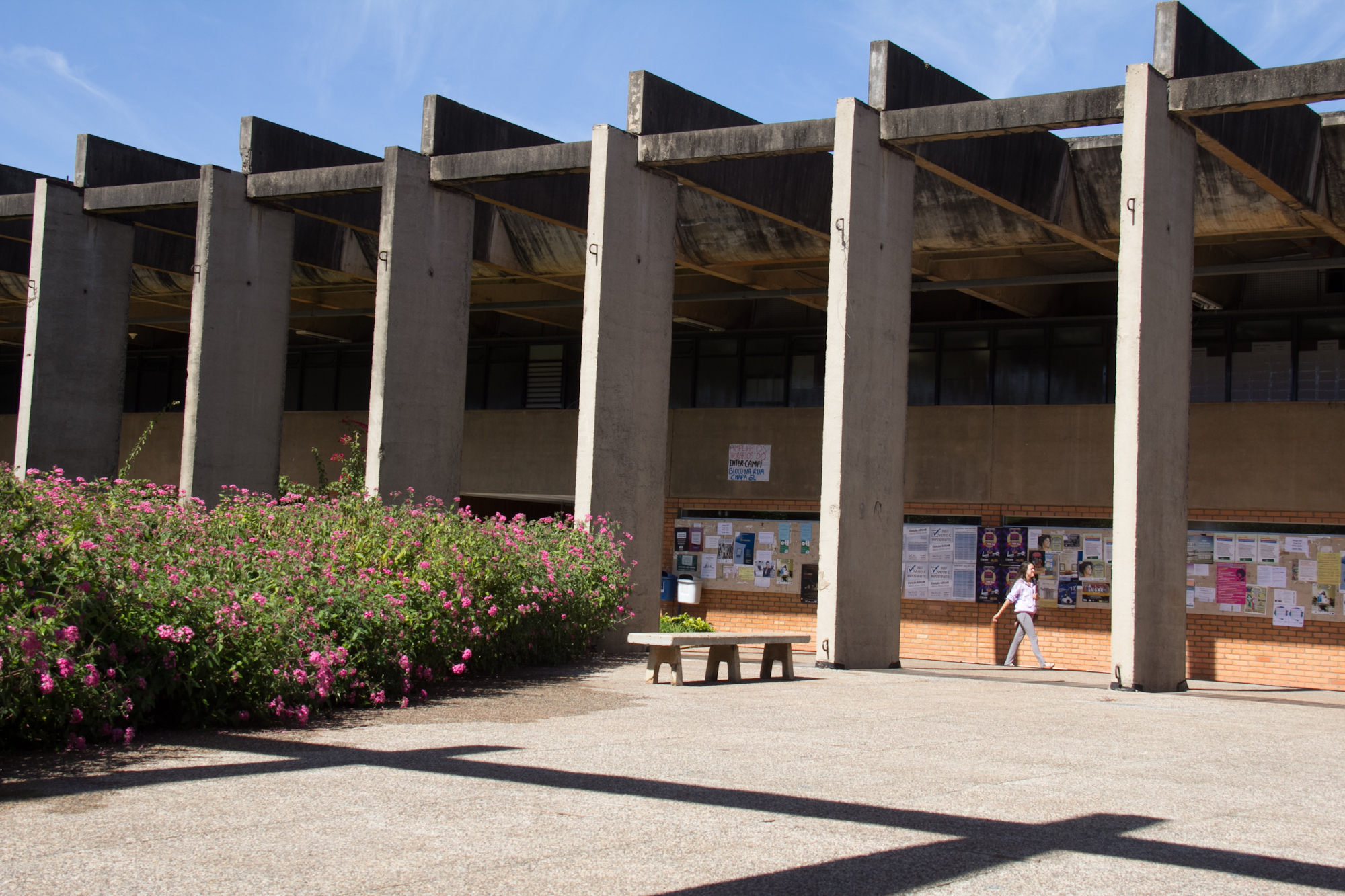
One of the entrances to the ICC.

=== Buildings ===
The university hosts:

- 22 institutes,
- 50 departments,
- 16 scientific, technological, cultural, artistic and general service centers,
- student and staff residences,
- a hospital,
- a sports center,
- a seismological observatory,
- physical experiment facilities, including plasma, liquid crystals, complex fluids and optical spectroscopy,
- an animal research laboratory,
- a library, the Central Library
- a student restaurant,
- the rectory building
- a farm for ecological, agricultural and forestry research, and
- an ecological station.

== Community involvement ==
The university runs 115 community outreach projects, offering a total of 438 courses and events. Involving the direct participation of 240 professors and 65,132 students, these activities reach nearly 185,000 people in the Federal District and surrounding region in Goiás and Minas Gerais.

Outreach activities include the Future with Art, Culture and Sport (FACE) program; the Community Initiatives Advisory Program (PRATICOM); the Program for Worker and Trade Union Leadership Training (PROSINT); the Rural Development Program and the Model Office for Legal Assistance. University members also offer consulting and assistance to the Community Health Training Program (PACs).

== Research ==
More than 260 research-groups work in more than 400 laboratories. This research is supported by the Technological and Scientific Initiation Program (PIBIC) and the Special Training Program (PET), which also offers scholarships to gifted undergraduates. Among other federal and state agencies, programs are funded by CNPq, CAPES, the Research and Projects Funding Program (FINEP), the Technological and Scientific Development Support Program (PADCT) and the Federal District Research Support Foundation (FAPDF).

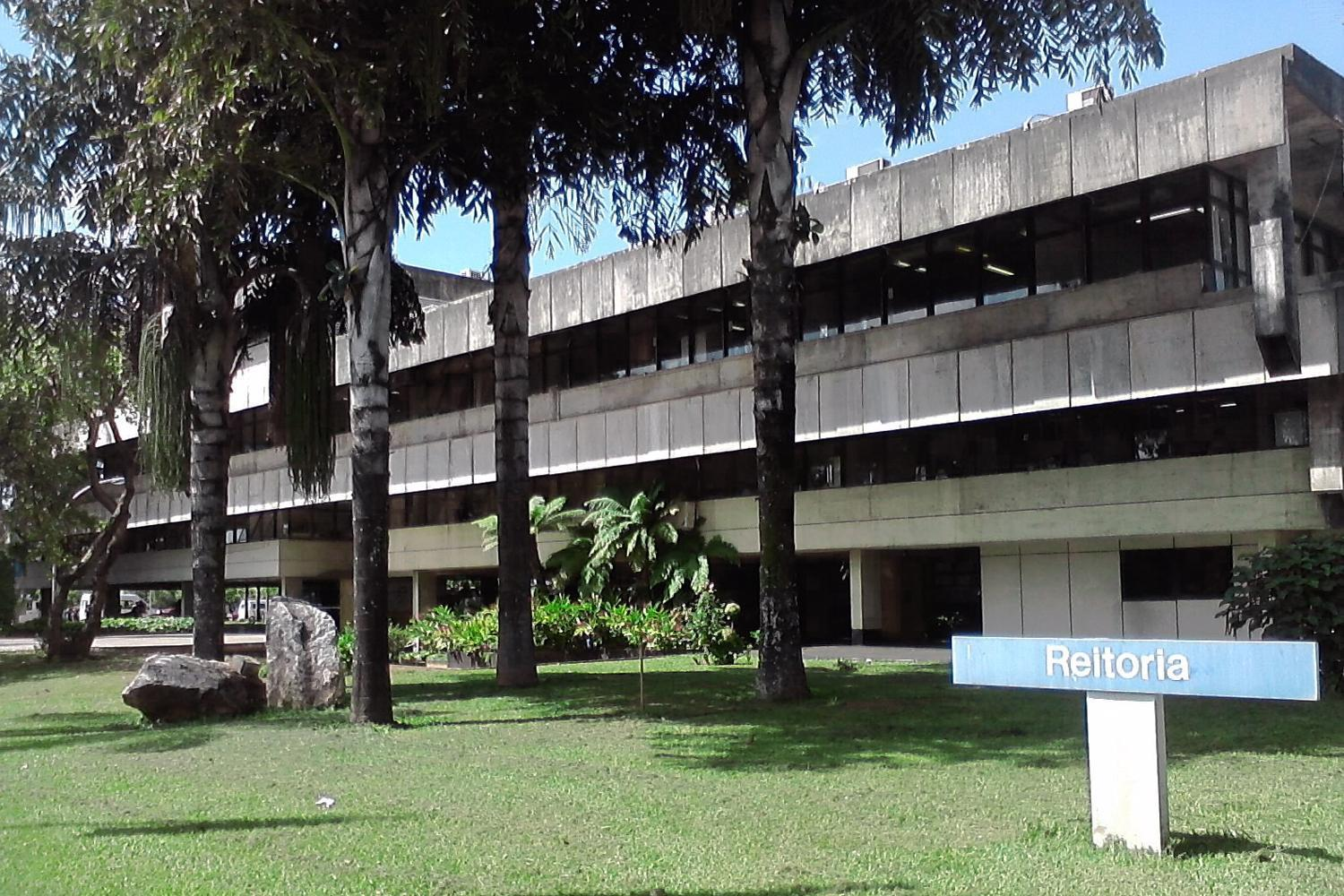
Rectory of the UnB

Other organisations active in the research area are the International Center for Condensed Matter Physics (CIFMC), the cbsp.unb.br [Brazilian Center for Protein Sequencing (CBSP)], the Center for Maintenance of Equipment (CME) and the university Herbarium. The Technological Development Center (CDT) works to integrate the University to the business world, maintaining a small business start-up program and other types of consulting assistance to business.

== Programa de Avaliação Seriada ==
The Continuing Evaluation Program (Portuguese: Programa de Avaliação Seriada) evaluates high school students interested in enrolling on a yearly basis during their three years of high school, in addition to the traditional Brazilian vestibular and the national ENEM exam. The university prefers this system to single entrance examinations.

== Rankings ==
University rankings

Global – Overall
- THE World: 801–1000 (2018)

In 2017, Times Higher Education ranked the university within the 801–1000 band globally.

== International students ==
The university accepts international students through:

- Exchange programs for international students from academic institutions and organizations that have an exchange agreement with the university. The program lasts from six months to one year.
- Undergraduate Students’ program (PEC-G – Programa de Estudante Convênio de Graduação) is for students from university institutions of developing countries that have developed activities in cooperation with the Brazilian government. Students from Latin America, Africa and Asia are the biggest partners of the UnB in this project.
- Post-Graduate program (PEC-PG – Programa de Estudante Convênio de Pós-Graduação) is through the Brazilian embassies abroad. The objective is to promote the qualification of senior staff of developing countries, by offering master's and doctorate degrees.
- The Federal Constitution International Affairs program accepts diplomats who are working in Brasília and their legal dependents.

== Notable alumni and faculty ==
=== Alumni ===
- Leticia Carvalho, oceanographer and international civil servant
- Ana Paula Vescovi, economist

=== Faculty ===
- Oscar Niemeyer, architect, Pritzker Prize 1988, and founder
- Athos Bulcão, visual artist and founder
- Cyro dos Anjos, writer
- Cristovam Buarque, mechanical engineer and politician, former governor of the Federal District, former senator, former Rector, and economics professor
- Claudio de Moura Castro, economist, educator, and columnist.
- Cesar da Sá, biochemist, lecturer, Pasteur Institute, Paris, and University of California, San Diego
- Nelson Pereira dos Santos, film director
- Teotonio Vilela Filho, politician, economist, current governor of Alagoas.
- Otto Richard Gottlieb, chemist, Nobel Prize in Chemistry nominee.
- Darcy Ribeiro, anthropologist, one of the founders of the University of Brasília
- Roberto Aureliano Salmeron, nuclear physicist.
- Cláudio Santoro, composer and violinist
- Anísio Teixeira, educator, founder.
- Antônio Augusto Cançado Trindade, jurist, "full professor" at UnB, elected judge of the International Court of Justice, professor of International Relations.
- Francisco Rezek, former Justice of the Brazilian Supreme Court, former judge of the International Court of Justice (1996–2006), professor of Law.
- Gilmar Mendes, Justice of the Brazilian Supreme Court, former President of the Supreme Court, professor of Law.
- Ítalo Fioravanti Sabo Mendes, judge of the Regional Federal Court of the 1st Region, professor of Law.
- Jorge Antunes, composer
- Marcos Bagno, linguist and translator
- Marisa von Bülow, political scientist and sociologist
- Affonso Arinos de Mello Franco, diplomat, journalist

== See also ==
- List of federal universities of Brazil
- Rankings of universities in Brazil
- Universities and higher education in Brazil
