= MetPetDB =

MetPetDB is a relational database and repository for global geochemical data on and images collected from metamorphic rocks from the Earth's crust. MetPetDB is designed and built by a global community of metamorphic petrologists in collaboration with computer scientists at Rensselaer Polytechnic Institute as part of the National Cyberinfrastructure Initiative and supported by the National Science Foundation. MetPetDB is unique in that it incorporates image data collected by a variety of techniques, e.g., photomicrographs, backscattered electron images (SEM), and X-ray maps collected by wavelength dispersive spectroscopy or energy dispersive spectroscopy.

== Purpose ==
MetPetDB was built for the purpose of archiving published data and for storing new data for ready access to researchers and students in the petrologic community. This database facilitates the gathering of information for researchers beginning new projects and permits browsing and searching for data relating to anywhere on the globe. MetPetDB provides a platform for collaborative studies among researchers anywhere on the planet, serves as a portal for students beginning their studies of metamorphic geology, and acts as a repository of vast quantities of data being collected by researchers globally.

== Design ==
The basic structure of MetPetDB is based on a geologic sample and derivative subsamples. Geochemical data are linked to subsamples and the minerals within them, while image data can relate to samples or subsamples. MetPetDB is designed to store the distinct spatial/textural context of mineral analysis that is crucial to petrologic interpretation. A web-based user interface allows a user to become member and download their search results. Approved members may become contributors and upload data to the catalogue and share with the public. More information about the data model and the design of the database is available on the MetPetDB Support Wiki.

== Contents ==
The database houses a wide range of information available for samples from all over the globe to be grouped into two categories: (a) observations and measurements (e.g. mineral data, images, chemical analyses), for which robust data models already exist, and (b) interpretative results (e.g. P-T conditions, crystallization ages, cooling rates, etc.), which are conclusions based on the observational data. Development of a robust data model for interpretative data is currently underway as of December 2010. The database system is beginning to incorporate several tools for data analysis and calculation that add considerable power to the researcher.

MetPetDB differs from other Geochemistry relational databases (e.g. GEOROC, NAVDAT, PetDB) in that it incorporates unpublished data in addition to data published in peer-reviewed journals. The vast majority of data collected by metamorphic geologists is not presented in publications, and therefore, a forum for sharing this data with the public is an objective of MetPetDB. Contributors to MetPetDB also can store private data and create projects, or collections of private, public, and published data for sharing and organization. A comprehensive list of the publications and their published samples is located at MetPetDB Published Samples
