= Purcell Supergroup =

Mesoproterozoic geological supergroup on the Canadian Shield

- Stratigraphic range: Mesoproterozoic
- Type: Geological supergroup
- Sub-units: Many
- Underlies: Windermere Supergroup
- Overlies: Canadian Shield
- Area: 15,000 km^{2} (5,800 sq mi)
- Thickness: more than 10,000 m (33,000 ft)

Lithology
- Primary: Argillite, dolomite, quartzite
- Other: Limestone, igneous rocks

Location
- Region: Alberta; British Columbia
- Country: Canada

Type section
- Named for: Purcell Mountains
- Named by: R.A. Daly, 1912.

The Purcell Supergroup is composed primarily of argillites, carbonate rocks, quartzites, and mafic igneous rocks of late Precambrian (Mesoproterozoic) age. It is present in an area of about 15,000 km^{2} (5,800 sq mi) in southwestern Alberta and southeastern British Columbia, Canada, and it extends into the northwestern United States where it is called the Belt Supergroup. It was named for the Purcell Mountains of British Columbia by R.A. Daly in 1912. Fossil stromatolites and algal structures are common in some of the Purcell Supergroup rocks, and the Sullivan ore body at Kimberley, British Columbia, a world-class deposit of lead, zinc, and silver, lies within the Alderidge Formation in the lower part of the Purcell.

Spectacular outcrops of Purcell and Belt Supergroup rocks can be seen in Glacier National Park in northwestern Montana and Waterton Lakes National Park in southwestern Alberta.

== Stratigraphy and lithology ==
The Purcell Supergroup consists primarily of argillites, carbonate rocks (limestone and dolomite), and quartzites, and includes localized occurrences of igneous rocks (mafic lava flows, tuffs, pillow basalts, and gabbroic and dioritic sills and dykes). Sedimentary structures are well preserved in the Purcell rocks despite their great age.

In the southern Canadian Rockies (Waterton Park area), the supergroup is subdivided as follows:

Geological unit	Lithology	Environment of Deposition	Maximum Thickness	Reference
Roosville Formation	green and grey argillite; dolomitic argillite, siltstone and sandstone; argillaceous and stromatolitic dolomite; mudcracks and ripple marks are common.	shallow marine (peritidal)	1,300 m (4,270 ft)	
Phillips Formation	red, thin-bedded quartz sandstone; siltstone interbedded with argillite and conglomerate; mudcracks and ripple marks are common.	marginal marine to nonmarine	200 m (660 ft)	
Gateway Formation	red siltstone and argillite; green argillite; dolomitic argillite; dolomitic sandstone; dolomite; and sandy dolomite; casts of salt crystals, mudcracks, ripple marks, and rip-up clasts are locally abundant.	marginal marine	1,350 m (4,430 ft)	
Sheppard Formation	light grey dolomite and stromatolitic dolomite; red dolomitic siltstone and sandstone; dolomitic argillite.	shallow marine	275 m (900 ft)	
Purcell Lava	dark green and reddish green to purple chloritized mafic lava flows, pillow basalts, gabbroic sills and dikes; amygdules of quartz, chlorite, and calcite are common.	shallow marine	150 m (490 ft)	
Siyeh Formation	argillaceous limestone and dolomite; black and green argillite; dolomitic quartzite; stromatolitic dolomite.	marginal marine	790 m (2,590 ft)	
Appekunny Formation	green and maroon argillite; white, grey, green, and pale red sandstone; quartz-pebble conglomerate.	marginal marine	1,000 m (3,280 ft)	
Altyn Formation	grey, thin-bedded argillaceous limestone and dolomite; massive sandy dolomite and stromatolitic dolomite; dark grey to black argillite.	shallow marine	300 m (980 ft)	
Waterton Formation	grey, green and red argillaceous dolomite; banded and streaked limestone and dolomite; grey and green, thin-bedded argillite.	marine	250 m (820 ft)	
Tombstone Mountain Formation	dark grey argillite; dolomitic argillite; argillaceous dolomite and limestone.	marine	175 m (570 ft)	
Haig Brook Formation	light colored, cliff-forming sequence of dolomite; banded and streaked limestone and dolomite; minor argillite; base of formation is not exposed.	marine	145 m (480 ft)	

In the southern Purcell Mountains (Cranbrook area), the supergroup is subdivided as follows:

Geological unit	Lithology	Environment of Deposition	Maximum Thickness	Reference
Roosville Formation	dolomitic argillite; siltstone; sandstone; and argillaceous and stromatolitic dolomite.	intertidal	300 m (980 ft)	
Phillips Formation	red, thin-bedded quartz sandstone; siltstone interbedded with argillite; ripple marks and mud cracks are abundant locally.	shallow water to subaerial	150 m (490 ft)	
Gateway Formation	grey-green, red, and purple siltstone; dolomitic siltstone; minor interbeds of argillite; casts of salt crystals, mudcracks, ripple marks, and rip-up clasts are locally abundant.	lagoonal	1,350 m (4,430 ft)	
Sheppard Formation	light grey stromatolitic dolomite, interbedded with dolomitic siltstone and argillite; stromatolite mounds up to 10 m (30 ft) thick; mudcracks, ripple marks, and rip-up clasts are locally abundant; casts of salt crystals are rare.	intertidal	125 m (410 ft)	
Intrusive rocks	fine- to coarse-grained sills and dikes of gabbro and diorite intrude the Aldridge to Van Creek Formations.	intrusive		
Nichol Creek Formation	green and purple argillite and siltstone; green volcanic sandstone and tuff interlayered with green or maroon, chloritized and sericitized basaltic to andesitic lavas, some with amygdules of quartz and chlorite.	subaerial	750 m (2,460 ft)	
Van Creek Formation	green to purple argillite and siltstone; mud cracks, ripple marks, and rip-up clasts are locally abundant.	intertidal	420 m (1,380 ft)	
Kitchner Formation	calcareous and dolomitic siltstone and argillite; silty dolomite and limestone; minor quartzite.	shallow subtidal (intertidal at base)	1,900 m (6,230 ft)	
Creston Formation	green, grey, and purple siltstone and argillite; mud cracks, ripple marks, and rip-up clasts are locally abundant.	shallow subtidal (intertidal at top)	2,350 m (7,710 ft)	
Aldridge Formation	fine-grained quartzite; argillaceous quartzite; rusty-weathering grey siltstone; dark grey argillite; base of formation not exposed.	marine (subtidal at top)	>4,200 m (13,780 ft)	

== Environment of deposition ==
The Purcell Supergroup was probably deposited in subsiding deltaic to marine environments along the margin of the North American craton, possibly in an intracratonic basin where North America and another landmass were joined in a supercontinent called Columbia/Nuna. Deposition occurred during the Mesoproterozoic era, much of it probably between about 1470 and 1400 Ma (million years) ago.

== Distribution and thickness ==
In Canada, the Purcell Supergroup is present in an area of about 15,000 km^{2} (5,800 sq mi) that reaches from the southern Purcell Mountains in southeastern British Columbia to the southern Canadian Rockies in the southwestern Alberta. It extends southward into the United States (western Montana, northern Idaho, northwestern Washington, and western Wyoming) where it is called the Belt Supergroup. It reaches a maximum thickness of more than 10,000 metres (33,000 feet) in the Purcell Mountains.

== Relationship to other units ==
The Purcell Supergroup is equivalent to the Belt Supergroup of the northwestern United States. The base of the Purcell is not exposed in Canada, but it is inferred to rest unconformably on the Canadian Shield. The Purcell is unconformably overlain by the Neoproterozoic Windermere Supergroup in most areas, or by younger Cambrian or Devonian formations where the Windermere is absent.

== Economic resources ==
The now-closed Sullivan Mine at Kimberley, British Columbia, worked a world-class sedimentary exhalative (SedEx) deposit that is hosted in the lower part of the Purcell Supergroup. During the life of the mine, the Sullivan ore body is reported to have yielded 8,412,077 tons of lead, 7,944,446 tons of zinc, and 9,264 tons of silver, as well as significant quantities of tin and other metals.
