= Windermere group =

Stratigraphic unit in Canada

Windermere Group
- Stratigraphic range: Neoproterozoic
- Type: Geological group or supergroup
- Sub-units: Many
- Underlies: Various units
- Overlies: Purcell Supergroup (Belt Supergroup)
- Thickness: more than 8,000 metres (26,250 ft)

Lithology
- Primary: Conglomerate, sandstone
- Other: Shale, carbonate rocks

Location
- Region: Montana, Idaho, Washington; Alberta, British Columbia, Northwest Territories, Yukon
- Country: United States, Canada

Type section
- Named for: Windermere map-area, British Columbia
- Named by: J.F. Walker

Called the Windermere Group in the United States and the Windermere Supergroup, Windermere Series, and Windermere System in Canada, the Windermere sequence of North America is an extensive assemblage of sedimentary and volcanic rocks of latest Precambrian (Neoproterozoic) age. It is present in the northern part of the North American Cordillera, stretching from Montana, Idaho, and Washington in the northwestern United States, through Alberta, British Columbia, the Northwest Territories, and the Yukon in western Canada. It was named for the Windermere map-area in the East Kootenay region of southeastern British Columbia by J.F. Walker in 1926.

The Windermere rocks include Ediacaran fossils and stromatolites, and host deposits of base and precious metals.

== Lithology ==
The Windermere consists primarily of coarse-grained feldspathic conglomerates and pebbly sandstones, with lesser amounts of pelitic shales, dolomites, and limestones. Mafic igneous rocks are present in some areas. In most areas the Windermere rocks are highly sheared, faulted, and metamorphosed.

== Environment of deposition ==
Most of the Windermere rocks were deposited as deep-water turbidite flows along a continental margin or in an active volcanic rift basin. Glacial events such as the Sturtian and Marinoan glaciations that occurred during Neoproterozoic time strongly influenced sedimentation, and some of the Windermere conglomerates are believed to be till or diamictite of glacial origin.

== Paleontology ==
Trace fossils, Ediacaran fossils, and Ediacaran-like fossils have been described from the Windermere Suprgroup in the Mackenzie and Werneke Mountains of the eastern Northwest Territories, the Cariboo Mountains of British Columbia, and the Canadian Rockies near Jasper, Alberta. Stromatolites are present in some of the carbonate beds.

== Thickness and distribution ==
The Windermere is both thick and extensive. It reaches thicknesses of more than 8,000 metres (26,250 ft), and is present parts of Montana, Idaho, and Washington in the United States, and parts of Alberta, British Columbia, the Northwest Territories, and the Yukon in Canada.
