= Sulfide deposit =

A sulfide deposit is an ore body or rock containing a great deal of sulfide minerals.

Articles on this topic include:

- Seafloor massive sulfide deposits
- Sedimentary exhalative deposits
- Volcanogenic massive sulfide ore deposit
- Massive sulfide deposits
