= Seabed =

Bottom of the ocean

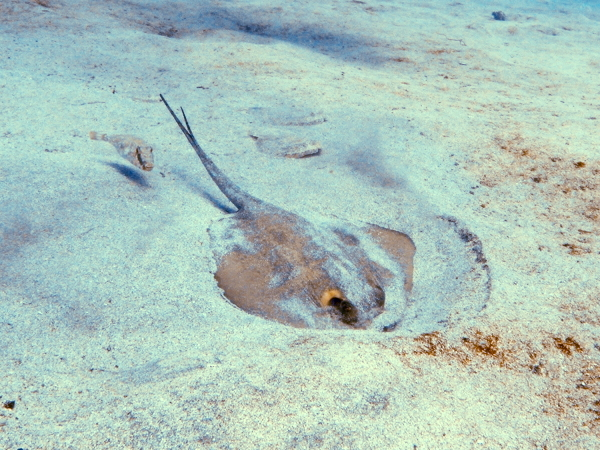
Common stingray foraging for invertebrates in seafloor sediment.

The seabed is the bottom of an ocean. Alternatively, it is known as the seafloor, sea floor, ocean floor, or ocean bottom. The floor of all the world's oceans is known as the seabed.

The structure of the seabed of the global ocean is governed by plate tectonics. Most of the ocean is very deep, where the seabed is known as the abyssal plain. Seafloor spreading creates mid-ocean ridges along the center line of major ocean basins, where the seabed is slightly shallower than the surrounding abyssal plain. From the abyssal plain, the seabed slopes upward toward the continents and becomes, in order from deep to shallow, the continental rise, slope, and shelf. The depth within the seabed itself, such as the depth down through a sediment core, is known as the "depth below seafloor". The ecological environment of the seabed and the deepest waters are collectively known, as a habitat for creatures, as the "benthos".

Most of the seabed throughout the world's oceans is covered in layers of marine sediments. Categorized by where the materials come from or composition, these sediments are classified as either: from land (terrigenous), from biological organisms (biogenous), from chemical reactions (hydrogenous), and from space (cosmogenous). Categorized by size, these sediments range from very small particles called clays and silts, known as mud, to larger particles from sand to boulders.

Features of the seabed are governed by the physics of sediment transport and by the biology of the creatures living in the seabed and in the ocean waters above. Physically, seabed sediments often come from the erosion of material on land and from other rarer sources, such as volcanic ash. Sea currents transport sediments, especially in shallow waters where tidal energy and wave energy cause resuspension of seabed sediments. Biologically, microorganisms living within the seabed sediments change seabed chemistry. Marine organisms create sediments, both within the seabed and in the water above. For example, phytoplankton with silicate or calcium carbonate shells grow in abundance in the upper ocean, and when they die, their shells sink to the seafloor to become seabed sediments.

Human impacts on the seabed are diverse. Examples of human effects on the seabed include exploration, plastic pollution, and exploitation by mining and dredging operations. To map the seabed, ships use acoustic technology to map water depths throughout the world. Submersible vehicles help researchers study unique seabed ecosystems such as hydrothermal vents. Plastic pollution is a global phenomenon, and because the ocean is the ultimate destination for global waterways, much of the world's plastic ends up in the ocean and some sinks to the seabed. Exploitation of the seabed involves extracting valuable minerals from sulfide deposits via deep sea mining, as well as dredging sand from shallow environments for construction and beach nourishment.

== Structure ==
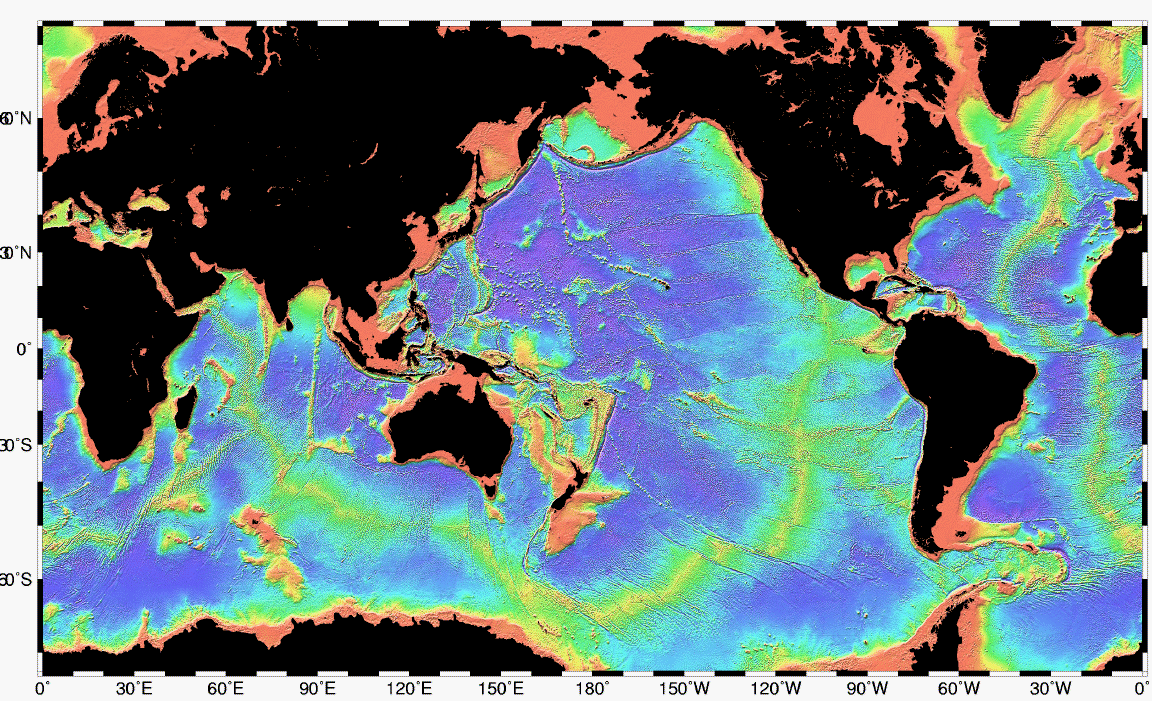
Bathymetry of the ocean floor showing the continental shelves and oceanic plateaus (red), the mid-ocean ridges (yellow-green) and the abyssal plains (blue to purple). Like land terrain, the ocean floor has mountains including volcanoes, ridges, valleys, and plains.

The major oceanic divisions

Most of the oceans have a common structure, created by common physical phenomena, mainly from tectonic movement, and sediment from various sources. The structure of the oceans, starting with the continents, begins usually with a continental shelf, continues to the continental slope – which is a steep descent into the ocean, until reaching the abyssal plain – a topographic plain, the beginning of the seabed, and its main area. The border between the continental slope and the abyssal plain usually has a more gradual descent, and is called the continental rise, which is caused by sediment cascading down the continental slope.

The mid-ocean ridge, as its name implies, is a mountainous rise through the middle of all the oceans, between the continents. Typically a rift runs along the edge of this ridge. Along tectonic plate edges there are typically oceanic trenches – deep valleys, created by the mantle circulation movement from the mid-ocean mountain ridge to the oceanic trench.

Hotspot volcanic island ridges are created by volcanic activity, erupting periodically, as the tectonic plates pass over a hotspot. In areas with volcanic activity and in the oceanic trenches there are hydrothermal vents – releasing high pressure and extremely hot water and chemicals into the typically freezing water around it.

Deep ocean water is divided into layers or zones, each with typical features of salinity, pressure, temperature and marine life, according to their depth. Lying along the top of the abyssal plain is the abyssal zone, whose lower boundary lies at about 6,000 m (20,000 ft). The hadal zone – which includes the oceanic trenches, lies between 6,000 and 11,000 metres (20,000–36,000 ft) and is the deepest oceanic zone.

=== Depth below seafloor ===
Depth below seafloor is a vertical coordinate used in geology, paleontology, oceanography, and petrology (see ocean drilling). The acronym "mbsf" (meaning "meters below the seafloor") is a common convention used for depths below the seafloor.

Different seabeds in the world's oceans

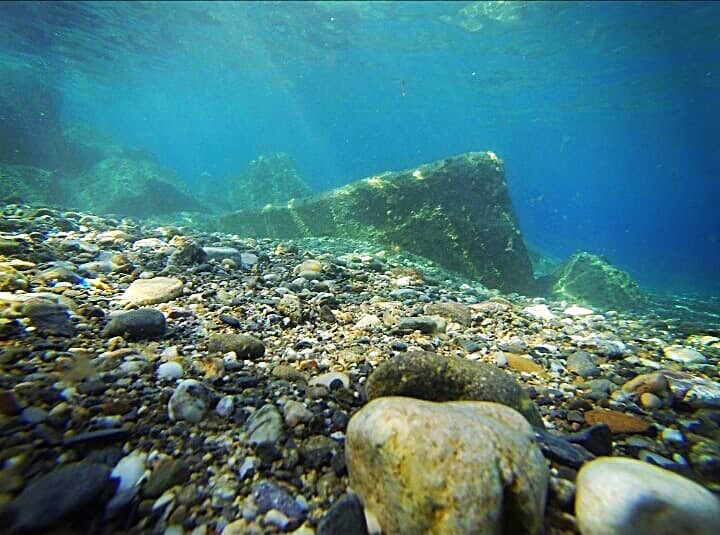
gravel seabed in Italy

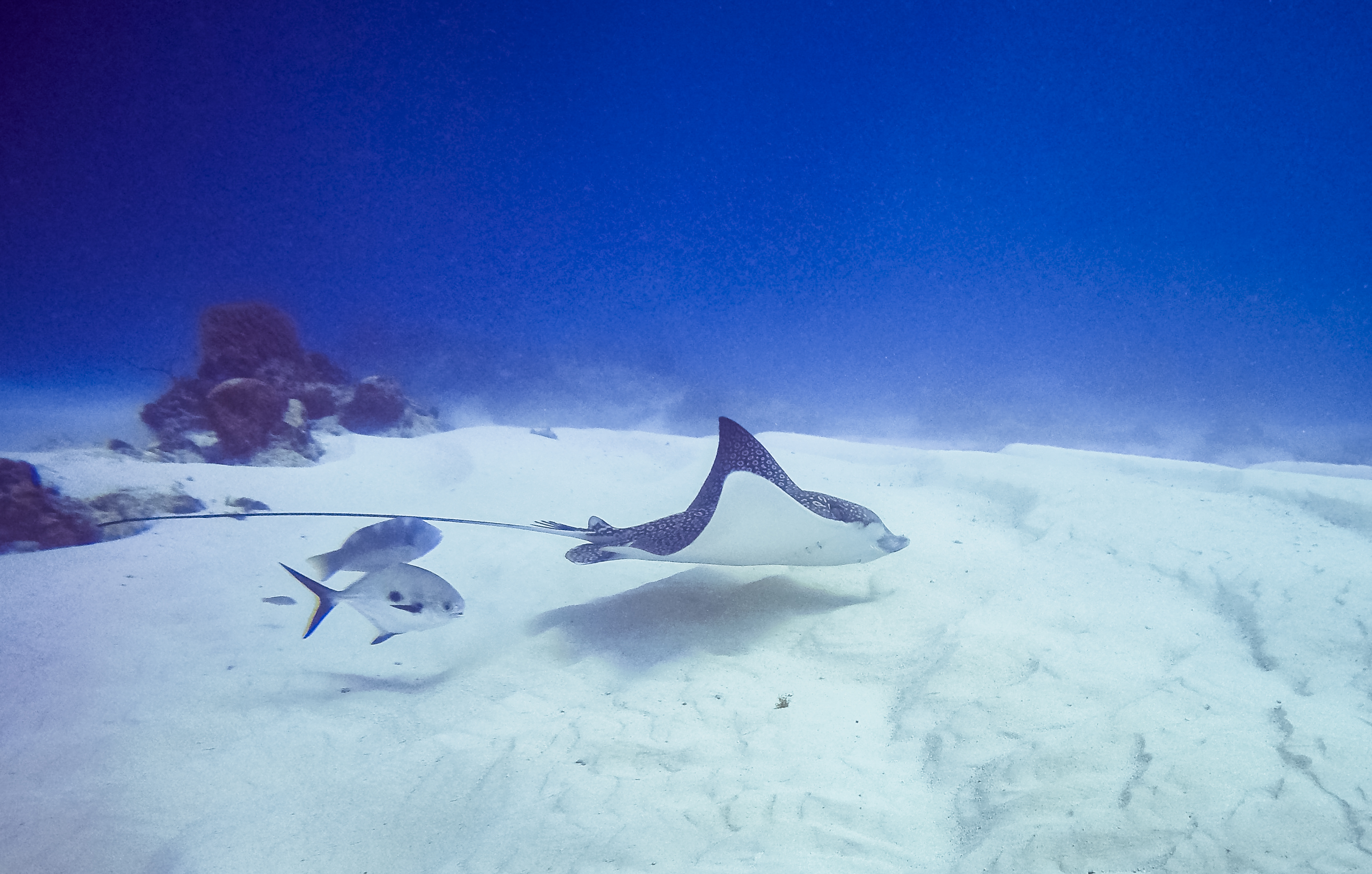
white sand seabed in Mexico

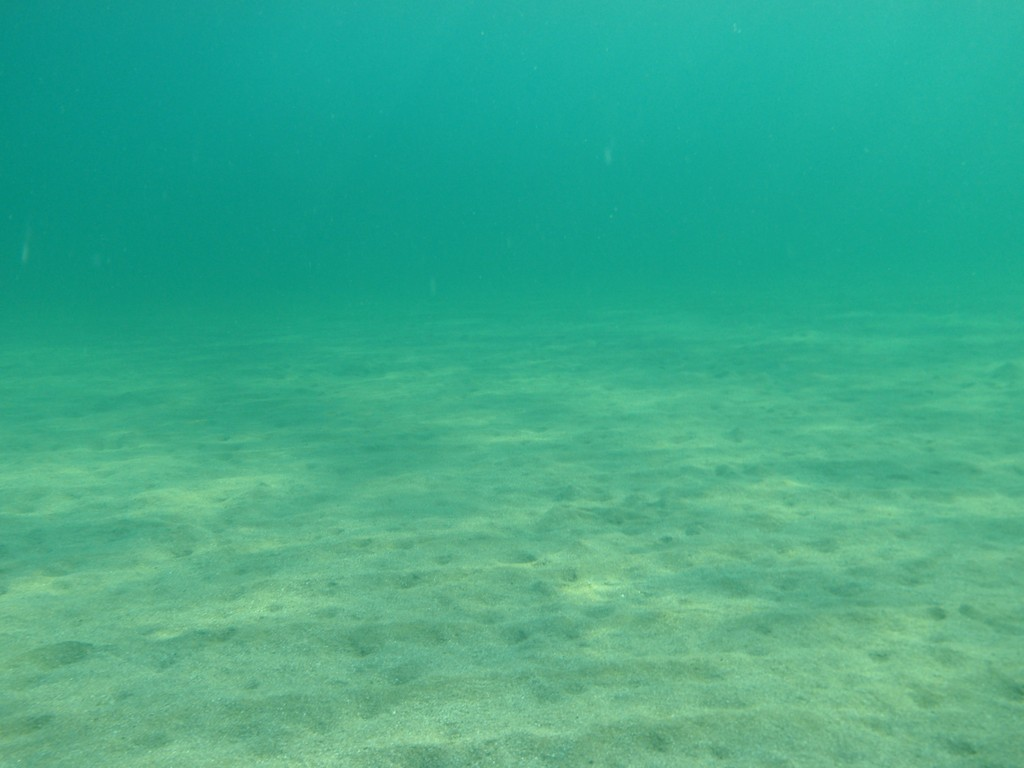
sand seabed in Greece

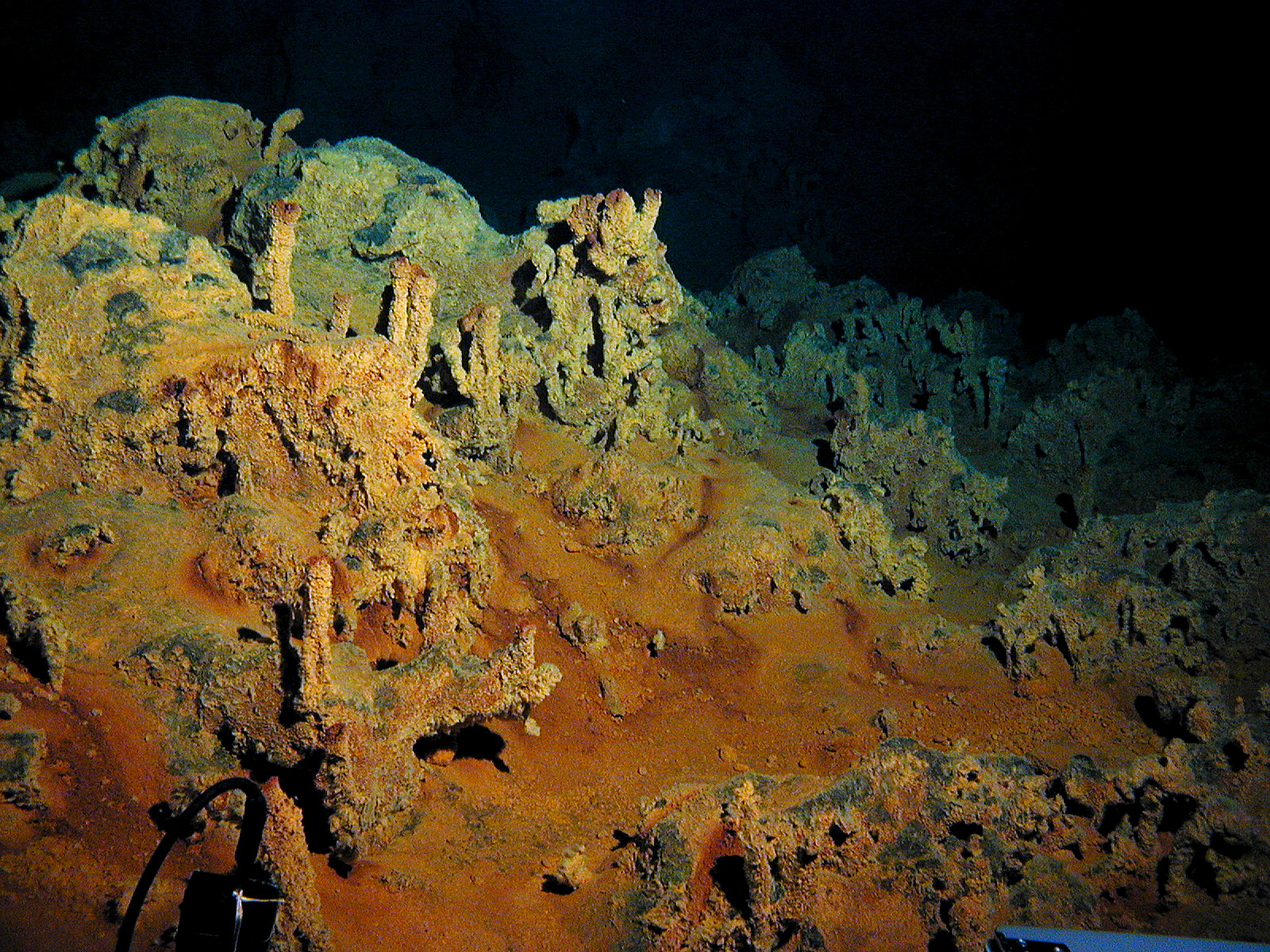
hydrothermal vents

== Sediments ==
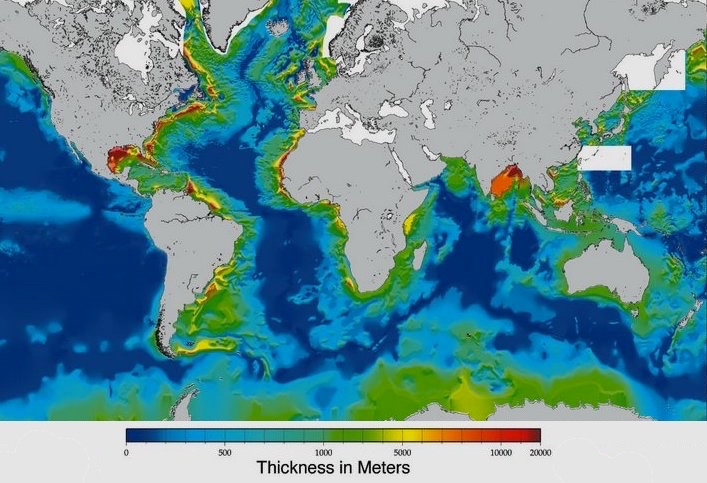
Total sediment thickness of the world's oceans and continental margins in meters.

Sediments in the seabed vary in origin, from eroded land materials carried into the ocean by rivers or wind flow, waste and decompositions of sea creatures, and precipitation of chemicals within the sea water itself, including some from outer space. There are four basic types of sediment of the sea floor:

1. Terrigenous (also lithogenous) describes the sediment from continents eroded by rain, rivers, and glaciers, as well as sediment blown into the ocean by the wind, such as dust and volcanic ash.
2. Biogenous material is the sediment made up of the hard parts of sea creatures, mainly phytoplankton, that accumulate on the bottom of the ocean.
3. Hydrogenous sediment is material that precipitates in the ocean when oceanic conditions change, or material created in hydrothermal vent systems.
4. Cosmogenous sediment comes from extraterrestrial sources.

=== Terrigenous and biogenous ===
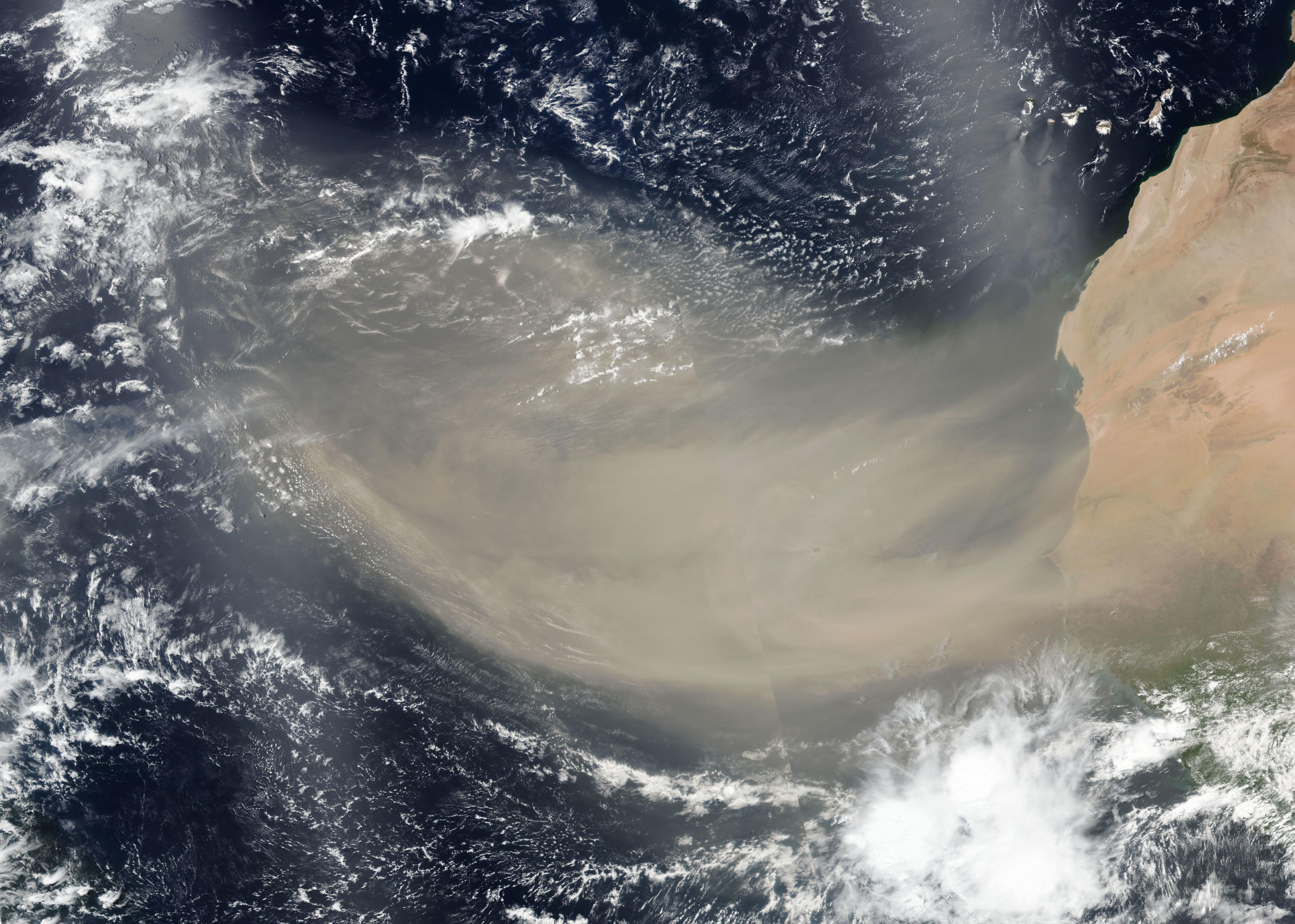
Satellite image of wind-blown mineral dust over the Atlantic. Dust may become terrigenous sediment on the seabed.

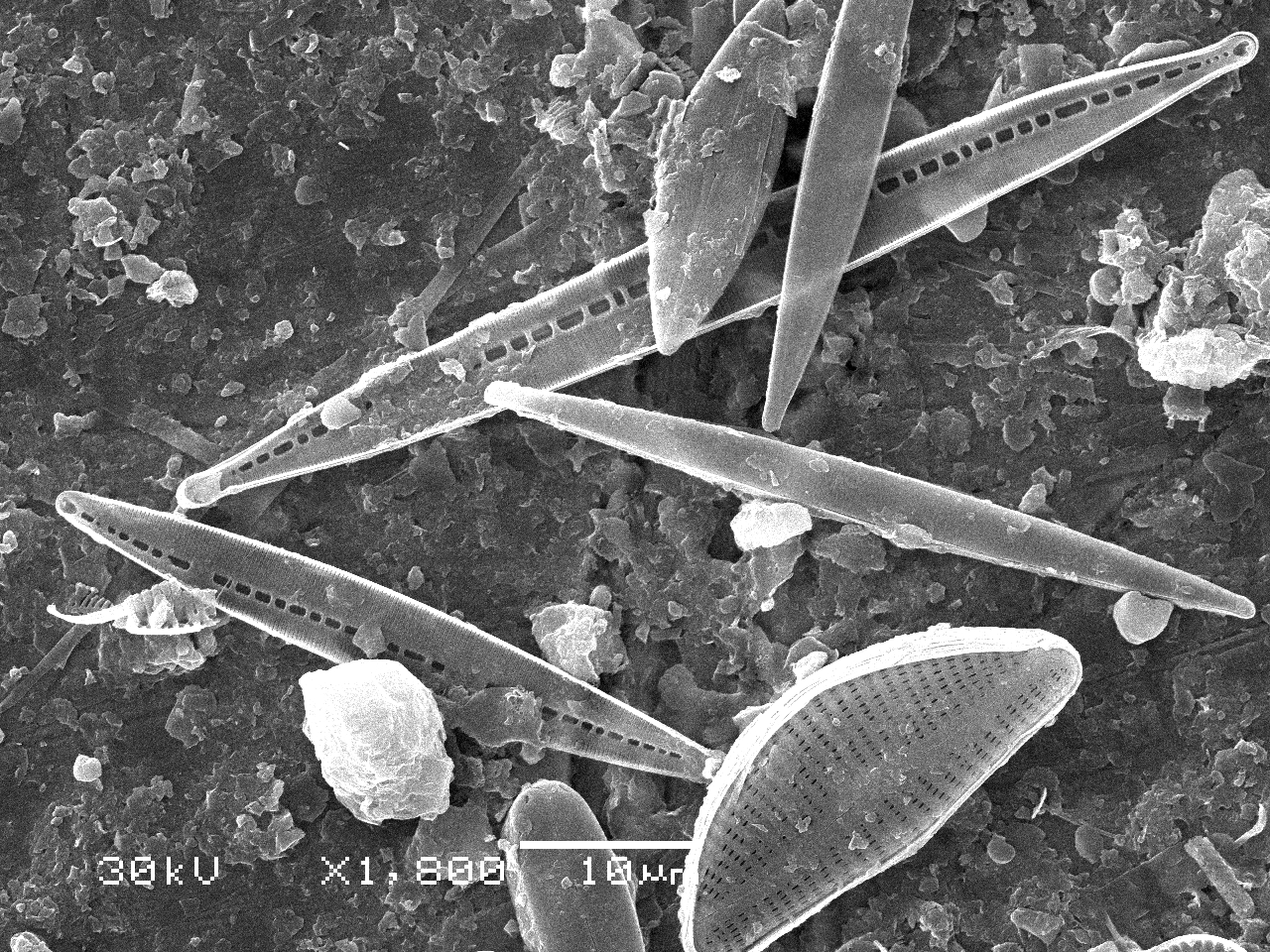
Phytoplankton grow shells which later sink to the seabed to become biogenous sediments. For example, diatoms make silicate shells, which become siliceous ooze.

Terrigenous sediment is the most abundant sediment found on the seafloor. Terrigenous sediments come from the continents. These materials are eroded from continents and transported by wind and water to the ocean. Fluvial sediments are transported from land by rivers and glaciers, such as clay, silt, mud, and glacial flour. Aeolian sediments are transported by wind, such as dust and volcanic ash.

Biogenous sediment is the next most abundant material on the seafloor. Biogenous sediments are biologically produced by living creatures. Sediments made up of at least 30% biogenous material are called "oozes." There are two types of oozes: Calcareous oozes and Siliceous oozes. Plankton grow in ocean waters and create the materials that become oozes on the seabed. Calcareous oozes are predominantly composed of calcium shells found in phytoplankton such as coccolithophores and zooplankton like the foraminiferans. These calcareous oozes are never found deeper than about 4,000 to 5,000 meters because at further depths the calcium dissolves. Similarly, Siliceous oozes are dominated by the siliceous shells of phytoplankton like diatoms and zooplankton such as radiolarians. Depending on the productivity of these planktonic organisms, the shell material that collects when these organisms die may build up at a rate anywhere from 1 mm to 1 cm every 1000 years.

=== Hydrogenous and cosmogenous ===
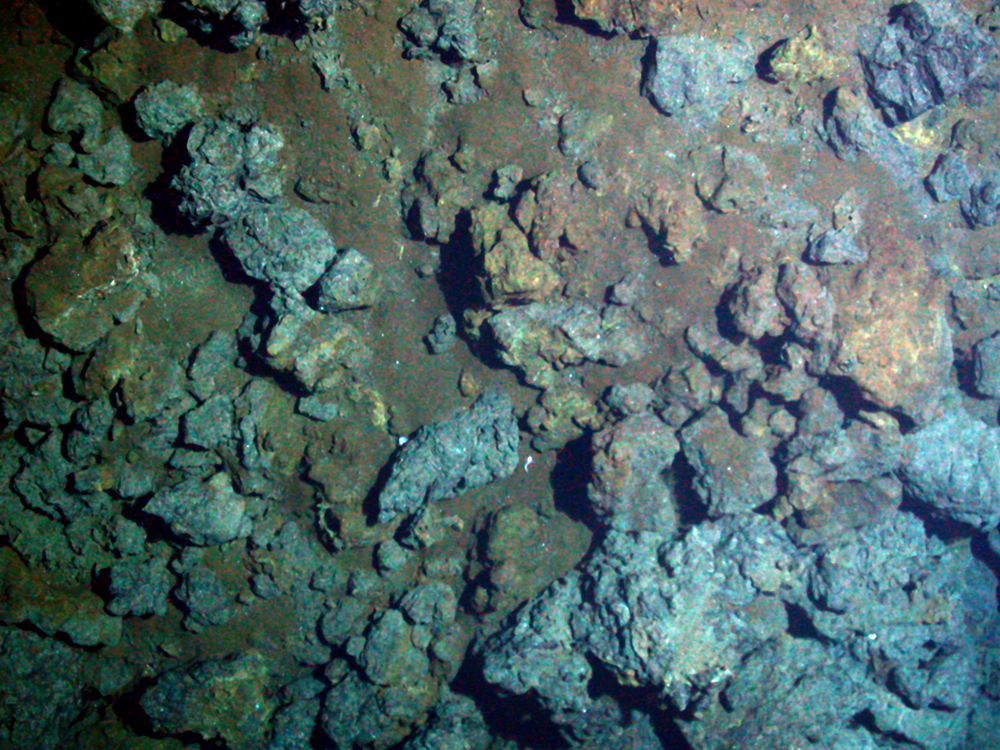
Hydrothermal vent fluids cause chemical reactions that precipitate out minerals that form sediments on the surrounding seafloor.

Hydrogenous sediments are uncommon. They only occur with changes in oceanic conditions such as temperature and pressure. Rarer still are cosmogenous sediments. Hydrogenous sediments are formed from dissolved chemicals that precipitate from the ocean water, or along the mid-ocean ridges, they can form by metallic elements binding onto rocks that have water of more than 300 °C circulating around them. When these elements mix with the cold sea water they precipitate from the cooling water. Known as manganese nodules, they are composed of layers of different metals like manganese, iron, nickel, cobalt, and copper, and they are always found on the surface of the ocean floor.

Cosmogenous sediments are the remains of space debris such as comets and asteroids, made up of silicates and various metals that have impacted the Earth.

=== Size classification ===
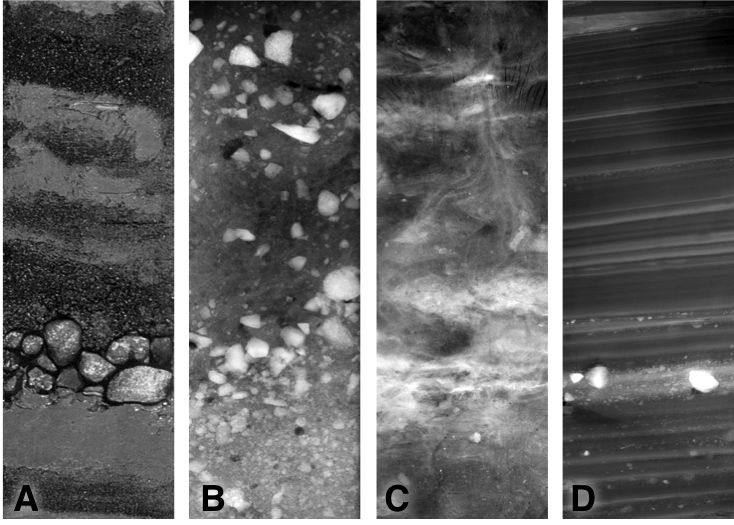
Sediment types from the Southern Ocean showing many different grain sizes: A) gravel and sand, B) gravel, C) bioturbated mud and sand, and D) laminated clays and silts.

Another way that sediments are described is through their descriptive classification. These sediments vary in size, anywhere from 1/4096 of a mm to greater than 256 mm. The different types are: boulder, cobble, pebble, granule, sand, silt, and clay, each type becoming finer in grain. The grain size indicates the type of sediment and the environment in which it was created. Larger grains sink faster and can only be pushed by rapid flowing water (high energy environment) whereas small grains sink very slowly and can be suspended by slight water movement, accumulating in conditions where water is not moving so quickly. This means that larger grains of sediment may come together in higher energy conditions and smaller grains in lower energy conditions.

== Benthos ==
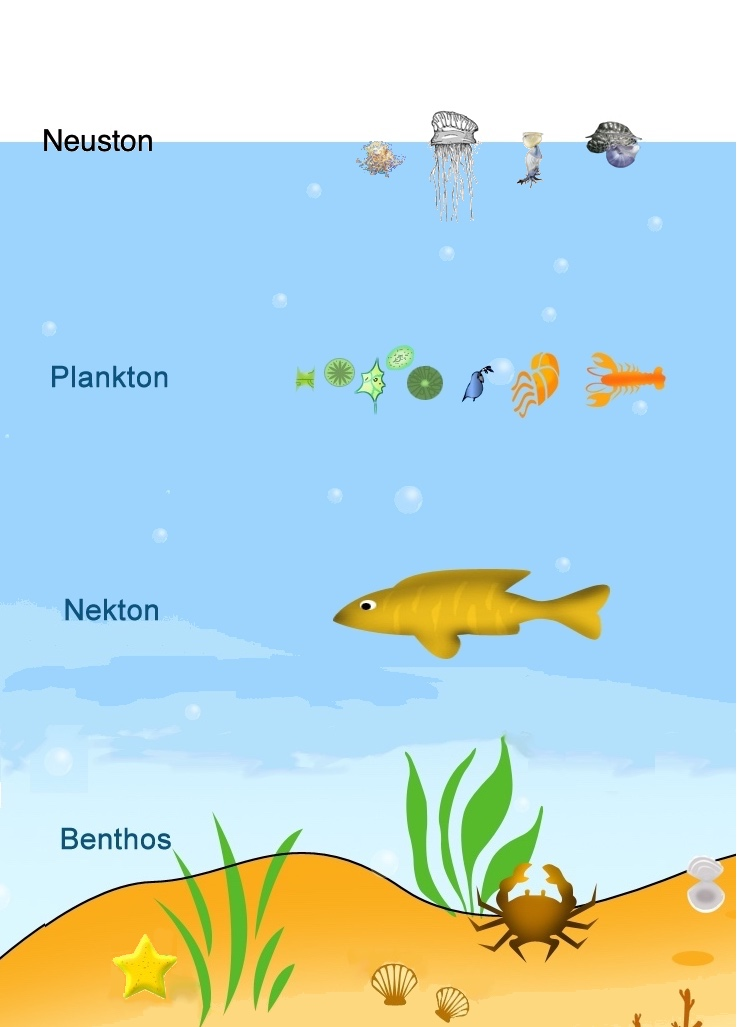
Benthos (organisms that live at the ocean floor) can be contrasted with neuston (organisms that live at the ocean surface) plankton (organisms that drift with water currents) and nekton (organisms that can swim against water currents)

Benthos is the community of organisms that live in the benthic zone, that is, on, in, or near the bottom of a stream, river, lake, or ocean. This community lives in or near marine or freshwater sedimentary environments, from tidal pools along the foreshore, out to the continental shelf, and then down to the abyssal depths.

The term benthos, coined by Haeckel in 1891, comes from the Greek noun βένθος 'depth of the ocean'. Additionally to oceans, benthos is also used in freshwater biology to refer to organisms at the bottom of freshwater bodies of water, such as streams, rivers, and lakes. There is also a redundant, occasionally used synonym, benthon. Benthos is also referred to more loosely and informally as bottom dwellers or bottom feeders.

Light is an important energy source for shallow benthic systems. However, because light is absorbed before it can reach deep ocean water, the energy source for deep benthic ecosystems is often organic matter from higher up in the water column that drifts down to the depths. This dead and decaying matter sustains the benthic food chain; most organisms in the benthic zone are scavengers or detritivores.

Many organisms adapted to deep-water pressure cannot survive in the upper parts of the water column. The pressure difference can be significant (approximately one atmosphere for every 10 metres of water depth).

Compared to the relatively featureless pelagic zone, the benthic zone offers physically diverse habitats. There is a huge range in how much light and warmth is available, and in the depth of water or extent of intertidal immersion. The seafloor varies widely in the types of sediment it offers. Burrowing animals can find protection and food in soft, loose sediments such as mud, clay and sand. Sessile species such as oysters and barnacles can attach themselves securely to hard, rocky substrates. As adults they can remain at the same site, shaping depressions and crevices where mobile animals find refuge. This greater diversity in benthic habitats has resulted in a higher diversity of benthic species. The number of benthic animal species exceeds one million. This far exceeds the number of pelagic animal species (about 5000 larger zooplankton species, 22,000 pelagic fish species and 110 marine mammal species).

Benthos are the organisms that live in the benthic zone, and are different from those elsewhere in the water column; even within the benthic zone variations in such factors as substrate, light penetration, temperature and salinity give rise to distinct differences, delineated vertically, in the groups of organisms supported. Many organisms adapted to deep-water pressure cannot survive in the upper parts of the water column: the pressure difference can be very significant (approximately one atmosphere for each 10 meters of water depth). Many have adapted to live on the substrate (bottom) or within the upper layers of the bottom. In their habitats they can be considered as dominant creatures, but they are often a source of prey for Carcharhinidae such as the lemon shark.

Because light does not penetrate very deep into ocean-water, the energy source for the benthic ecosystem is often marine snow. Marine snow is organic matter from higher up in the water column that drifts down to the depths. This dead and decaying matter sustains the benthic food chain; most organisms in the benthic zone are scavengers or detritivores. Some microorganisms use chemosynthesis to produce biomass.

Benthic organisms can be divided into two categories based on whether they make their home on the ocean floor or a few centimeters into the ocean floor. Those living on the surface of the ocean floor are known as epifauna. Those who live burrowed into the ocean floor are known as infauna. Extremophiles, including piezophiles, which thrive in high pressures, may also live there.

== Topography ==
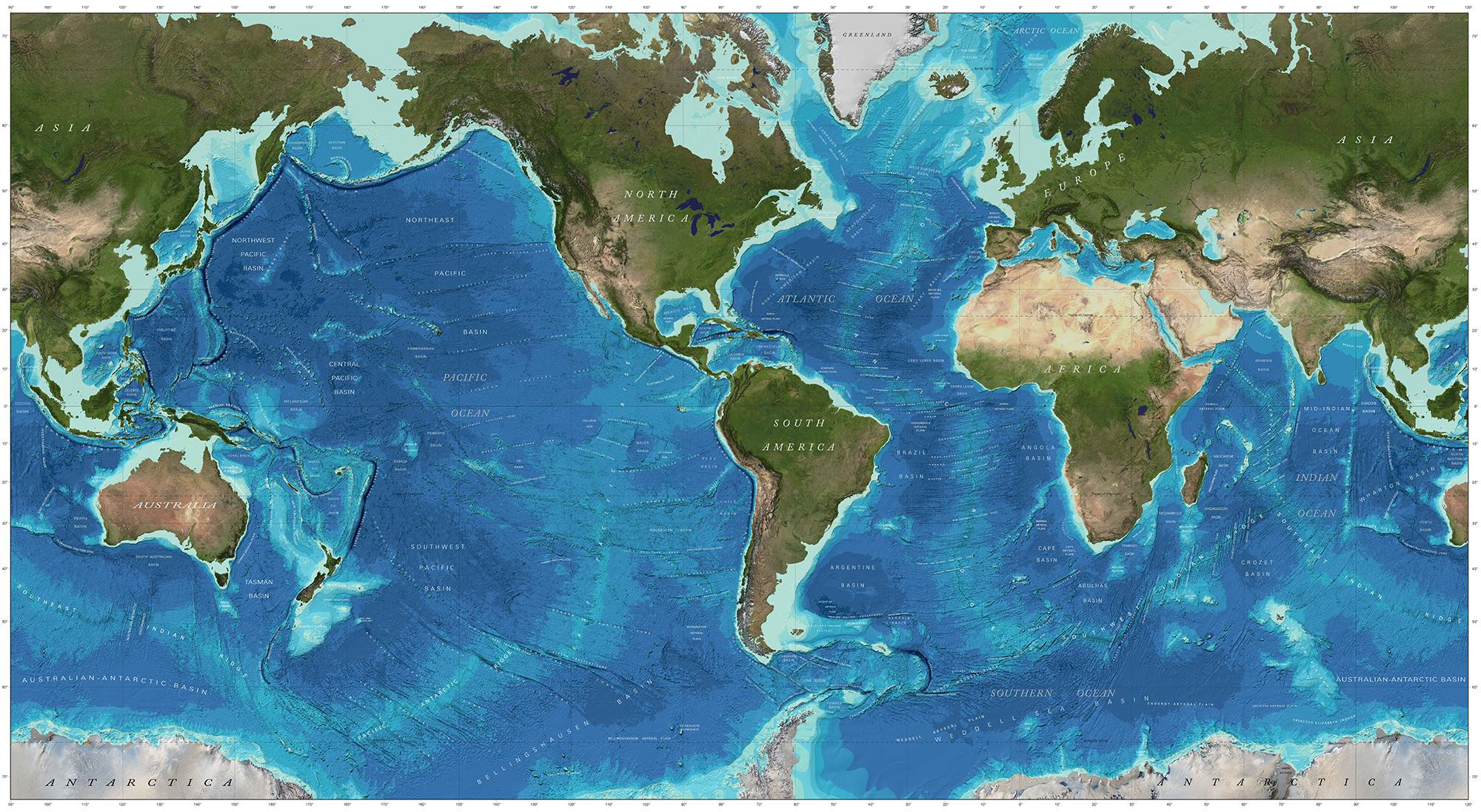
World map with ocean topography

Seabed topography (ocean topography or marine topography) refers to the shape of the land (topography) when it interfaces with the ocean. These shapes are obvious along coastlines, but they occur also in significant ways underwater. The effectiveness of marine habitats is partially defined by these shapes, including the way they interact with and shape ocean currents, and the way sunlight diminishes when these landforms occupy increasing depths. Tidal networks depend on the balance between sedimentary processes and hydrodynamics however, anthropogenic influences can impact the natural system more than any physical driver.

Marine topographies include coastal and oceanic landforms ranging from coastal estuaries and shorelines to continental shelves and coral reefs. Further out in the open ocean, they include underwater and deep sea features such as ocean rises and seamounts. The submerged surface has mountainous features, including a globe-spanning mid-ocean ridge system, as well as undersea volcanoes, oceanic trenches, submarine canyons, oceanic plateaus and abyssal plains.

The mass of the oceans is approximately 1.35×10^{18} metric tons, or about 1/4400 of the total mass of the Earth. The oceans cover an area of 3.618×10^{8} km^{2} with a mean depth of 3,682 m, resulting in an estimated volume of 1.332×10^{9} km^{3}.

Depth Range (meters)	Seafloor Area (km^{2})	Seafloor Percentage
0 – 200	26,402,000	7.30%
201 – 1000	15,848,000	4.38%
1001 – 4000	127,423,000	35.22%
4001 – 6000	188,395,000	52.08%
6001 – 7000	3,207,000	0.89%
7001 – 8000	320,000	0.09%
8001 – 9000	111,000	0.03%
9000 – 10,000	37,000	0.01%
10,000 +	2,000	< 0.01%

== Features ==
Layers of the pelagic zone

Each region of the seabed has typical features such as common sediment composition, typical topography, salinity of water layers above it, marine life, magnetic direction of rocks, and sedimentation. Some features of the seabed include flat abyssal plains, mid-ocean ridges, deep trenches, and hydrothermal vents.

Seabed topography is flat where layers of sediments cover the tectonic features. For example, the abyssal plain regions of the ocean are relatively flat and covered in many layers of sediments. Sediments in these flat areas come from various sources, including but not limited to: land erosion sediments from rivers, chemically precipitated sediments from hydrothermal vents, Microorganism activity, sea currents eroding the seabed and transporting sediments to the deeper ocean, and phytoplankton shell materials.

Where the seafloor is actively spreading and sedimentation is relatively light, such as in the northern and eastern Atlantic Ocean, the original tectonic activity can be clearly seen as straight line "cracks" or "vents" thousands of kilometers long. These underwater mountain ranges are known as mid-ocean ridges.

Other seabed environments include hydrothermal vents, cold seeps, and shallow areas. Marine life is abundant in the deep sea around hydrothermal vents. Large deep sea communities of marine life have been discovered around black and white smokers – vents emitting chemicals toxic to humans and most vertebrates. This marine life receives its energy both from the extreme temperature difference (typically a drop of 150 degrees) and from chemosynthesis by bacteria. Brine pools are another seabed feature, usually connected to cold seeps. In shallow areas, the seabed can host sediments created by marine life such as corals, fish, algae, crabs, marine plants and other organisms.

== Human impact ==
=== Exploration ===
A video describing the operation and use of an autonomous lander in deep sea research.

The seabed has been explored by submersibles such as Alvin and, to some extent, scuba divers with special equipment. Hydrothermal vents were discovered in 1977 by researchers using an underwater camera platform. In recent years satellite measurements of ocean surface topography show very clear maps of the seabed, and these satellite-derived maps are used extensively in the study and exploration of the ocean floor.

=== Plastic pollution ===
In 2020 scientists created what may be the first scientific estimate of how much microplastic currently resides in Earth's seafloor, after investigating six areas of ~3 km depth ~300 km off the Australian coast. They found the highly variable microplastic counts to be proportionate to plastic on the surface and the angle of the seafloor slope. By averaging the microplastic mass per cm^{3}, they estimated that Earth's seafloor contains ~14 million tons of microplastic – about double the amount they estimated based on data from earlier studies – despite calling both estimates "conservative" as coastal areas are known to contain much more microplastic pollution. These estimates are about one to two times the amount of plastic thought – per Jambeck et al., 2015 – to currently enter the oceans annually.

=== Bottom trawling ===
Wild fish catch from bottom trawling (1950–2018)

Bottom trawling is trawling (towing a trawl, which is a fishing net) along the seafloor. It is also referred to as "dragging". The scientific community divides bottom trawling into benthic trawling and demersal trawling. Benthic trawling is towing a net at the very bottom of the ocean and demersal trawling is towing a net just above the benthic zone. Bottom trawling can be contrasted with midwater trawling (also known as pelagic trawling), where a net is towed higher in the water column. Midwater trawling catches pelagic fish such as anchovies and mackerel, whereas bottom trawling targets both bottom-living fish (groundfish) and semi-pelagic species such as cod, squid, shrimp, and rockfish.

Trawling is done by a trawler, which can be a small open boat with only 30 hp (22 kW) or a large factory trawler with 10,000 hp (7,500 kW). Bottom trawling can be carried out by one trawler or by two trawlers fishing cooperatively (pair trawling).

Global catch from bottom trawling has been estimated at over 30 million tonnes per year, an amount larger than any other fishing method. Concerns about the environmental impacts of bottom trawling have led to changes in gear design, such as the addition of turtle excluder devices to reduce bycatch, and limitations on locations where bottom trawling is allowed, such as marine protected areas. A 2021 paper estimated that bottom trawling contributed between 600 and 1500 million tons of carbon dioxide a year by disturbing carbon dioxide in the sea floor – emissions approximately equivalent to those of Germany, or the aviation industry. However, these values are highly uncertain and have been criticized as overestimates. International attempts to limit bottom trawling have been ineffective.

=== Deep sea mining ===
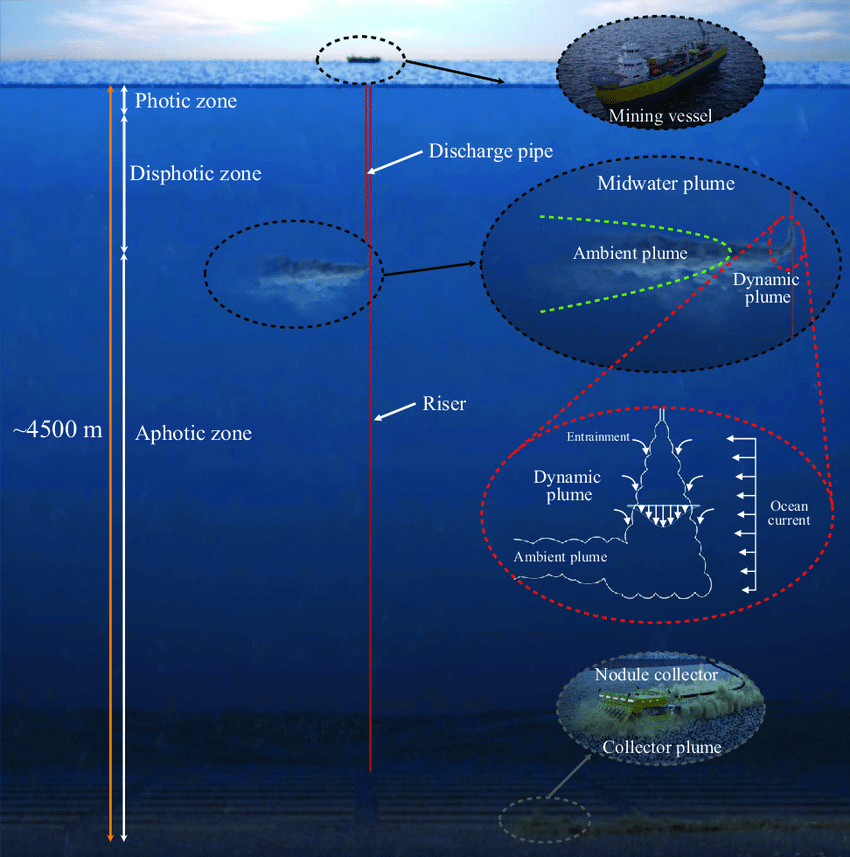
Schematic of a polymetallic nodule mining operation. From top to bottom, the three zoom-in panels illustrate the surface operation vessel, the midwater sediment plume, and the nodule collector operating on the seabed. The midwater plume comprises two stages: (i) the dynamic plume, in which the sediment-laden discharge water rapidly descends and dilutes to a neutral buoyancy depth, and (ii) the subsequent ambient plume that is advected by the ocean current and subject to background turbulence and settling.

Deep sea mining is the extraction of minerals from the seabed of the deep sea. The main ores of commercial interest are polymetallic nodules, which are found at depths of 4–6 km (2.5–3.7 mi) primarily on the abyssal plain. The Clarion–Clipperton zone (CCZ) alone contains over 21 billion metric tons of these nodules, with minerals such as copper, nickel, cobalt and manganese making up roughly 30% of their weight. It is estimated that the global ocean floor holds more than 120 million tons of cobalt, five times the amount found in terrestrial reserves.

Studies have shown that midwater mining techniques causing plumes can trigger bottom-up ecosystem impacts with severe consequences to marine life, extending beyond the initial mining area.

As of July 2024, only exploratory licenses have been issued, with no commercial-scale deep sea mining operations yet. The International Seabed Authority (ISA) regulates all mineral-related activities in international waters and has granted 31 exploration licenses so far: 19 for polymetallic nodules, mostly in the CCZ; 7 for polymetallic sulphides in mid-ocean ridges; and 5 for cobalt-rich crusts in the Western Pacific Ocean. There is a push for deep sea mining to commence by 2025, when regulations by the ISA are expected to be completed.

In April 2025, U.S. President Trump signed an Executive Order instructing the National Oceanic and Atmospheric Administration to expedite permits for companies to mine in both international and U.S. territorial waters, citing the Deep Seabed Hard Minerals Resource Act of 1980.

Deep sea mining is being considered in the exclusive economic zone (EEZ) of countries, such as Norway, where in January 2024 the government announced its intention to allow companies to apply for exploration permits in 2025. In December 2024, Norway's plans to begin awarding exploration licenses were temporarily put on hold after the Socialist Left Party (SV) blocked the planned licensing round as part of negotiations over the government budget. In 2022, the Cook Islands Seabed Minerals Authority (SBMA) granted three exploration licenses for cobalt-rich polymetallic nodules within their EEZ. In 2025, it was announced that the Cook Islands had signed a deal with China focused on deep-sea mining. Papua New Guinea was the first country to approve a deep sea mining permit in state waters for the Solwara 1 project, despite three independent reviews highlighting significant gaps and flaws in the environmental impact statement.

The most common commercial model of deep sea mining proposed involves a caterpillar-track hydraulic collector and a riser lift system bringing the harvested ore to a production support vessel with dynamic positioning, and then depositing extra discharge down the water column below 2,000 meters. Related technologies include robotic mining machines, as surface ships, and offshore and onshore metal refineries. Though largely composed of nickel and manganese which are most widely used as key inputs into the steel industry, wind farms, solar energy, electric vehicles, and battery technologies use many of the deep-sea metals. Electric vehicle batteries are a key driver of the critical metals demand that incentivizes deep sea mining, as well as demands for the production of aerospace and defense technologies, and infrastructure.

The environmental impact of deep sea mining is controversial. Environmental advocacy groups such as Greenpeace and the Deep Sea Mining Campaign claimed that seabed mining has the potential to damage deep sea ecosystems and spread pollution from heavy metal-laden plumes. Critics have called for moratoria or permanent bans. Opposition campaigns enlisted the support of some industry figures, including firms reliant on the target metals. Individual countries like Norway, Cook Islands, India, Brazil and others with significant deposits within their exclusive economic zones (EEZ's) are exploring the subject.

As of 2021, the majority of marine mining used dredging operations in far shallower depths of less than 200 m, where sand, silt and mud for construction purposes is abundant, along with mineral rich sands containing ilmenite and diamonds.

=== In art and culture ===
On and under the seabed are archaeological sites of historic interest, such as shipwrecks and sunken towns. This underwater cultural heritage is protected by the UNESCO Convention on the Protection of the Underwater Cultural Heritage. The convention aims at preventing looting and the destruction or loss of historic and cultural information by providing an international legal framework.

== See also ==
- Bottom trawling – Fishing method by towing a net along the seafloor
- Demersal fish – Fish that live and feed on or near the bottom of seas or lakes
- Human outpost – Human habitats located in environments inhospitable for humans
- International waters – Water outside of national jurisdiction
- Manganese nodule – Mineral concretion found on the sea bottom
- Methane clathrate – Methane-water lattice compound
- Nepheloid layer – Layer of water in deep sea
- New Zealand foreshore and seabed controversy – Indigenous rights controversy
- Offshore geotechnical engineering – Sub-field of engineering concerned with human-made structures in the sea
- Petrological Database of the Ocean Floor (PetBD)
- Plate tectonics – Movement of Earth's lithosphere
- Research vessel – Ship or boat designed, modified, or equipped to carry out research at sea
- Riverbed – Channel bottom of a stream, river, or creek
- Seabed characterization – Partitioning of a seabed acoustic image into discrete physical entities or classes
- Seafloor mapping – Study of underwater depth of lake or ocean floors
- Seafloor massive sulfide deposits – Mineral deposits from seafloor hydrothermal vents
- Sediment Profile Imagery (SPI) – Technique for photographing the interface between the seabed and the overlying water
