= Belt Supergroup =

Assembly of magmatic and sedimentary rocks that date to the Mesoproterozoic

- Stratigraphic range: Mesoproterozoic
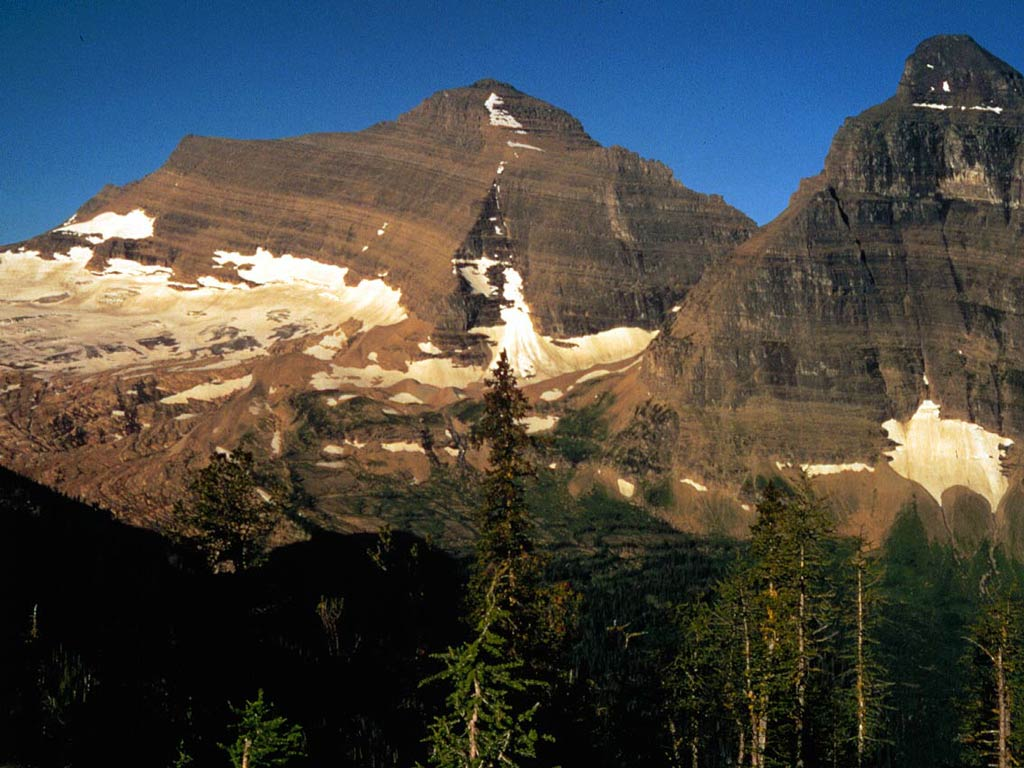
- Belt Supergroup strata exposed on Kintla Peak in Glacier National Park.
- Type: Geological supergroup
- Sub-units: Many
- Underlies: Flathead Formation
- Overlies: Archean and Paleoproterozoic rocks
- Thickness: more than 15 kilometres (10 mi)

Lithology
- Primary: Mudstone, argillite
- Other: Sandstone, quartzite, conglomerate, intrusive rocks

Location
- Region: Montana, Idaho, Washington, Wyoming
- Country: United States

Type section
- Named for: Big Belt Mountains, Montana

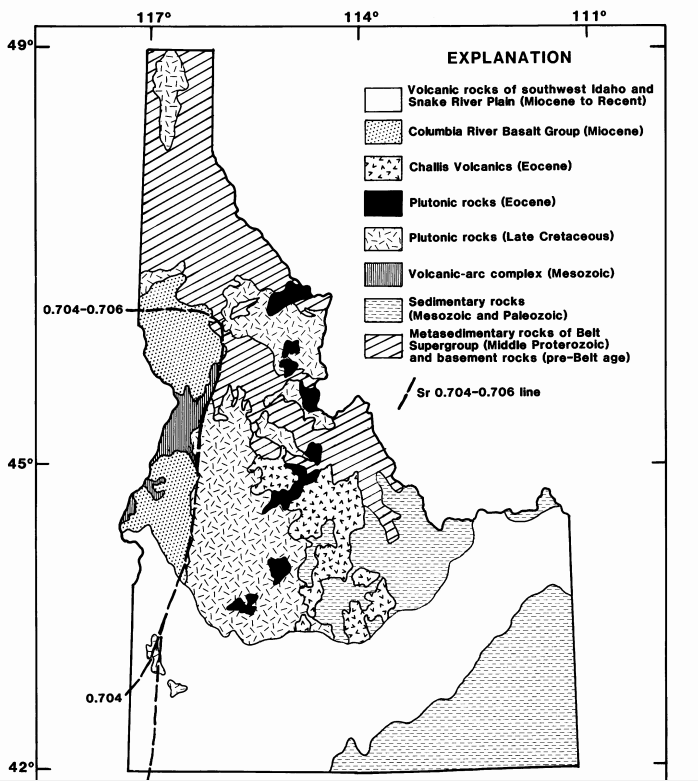
Geological map of the Belt Supergroup in Idaho

The Belt Supergroup is an assemblage of primarily fine-grained sedimentary rocks and mafic intrusive rocks of late Precambrian (Mesoproterozoic) age. It is more than 15 kilometres (10 mi) thick, covers an area of some 200,000 km^{2} (77,220 sq. mi), and is considered to be one of the world's best-exposed and most accessible sequences of Mesoproterozoic rocks. It was named after the Big Belt Mountains in west-central Montana. It is present in western Montana and northern Idaho, with minor occurrences in northeastern Washington and western Wyoming. It extends into Canada where the equivalent rocks, which are called the Purcell Supergroup, are exposed in southeastern British Columbia and southwestern Alberta. The rocks of the Belt Supergroup contain economically significant deposits of lead, zinc, silver, copper, gold, and other metals in a number of areas, and some of the Belt rocks contain fossil stromatolites.

Spectacular outcrops of Belt rocks can be seen in Glacier National Park in northwestern Montana and in Waterton Lakes National Park in southwestern Alberta.

== Lithology and sedimentology ==
The Belt Supergroup is dominated by fine-grained sedimentary rocks, primarily mudstones, siltstones, fine-grained quartzose sandstones and limestones. Most have undergone weak metamorphism to greenschist facies, and as a result the mudrocks are commonly classified as argillites and the sandstones as quartzites. The Belt Supergroup also includes lesser amounts of coarser grained sandstones and conglomerates. Mafic intrusive rocks are present locally in the lower portion.

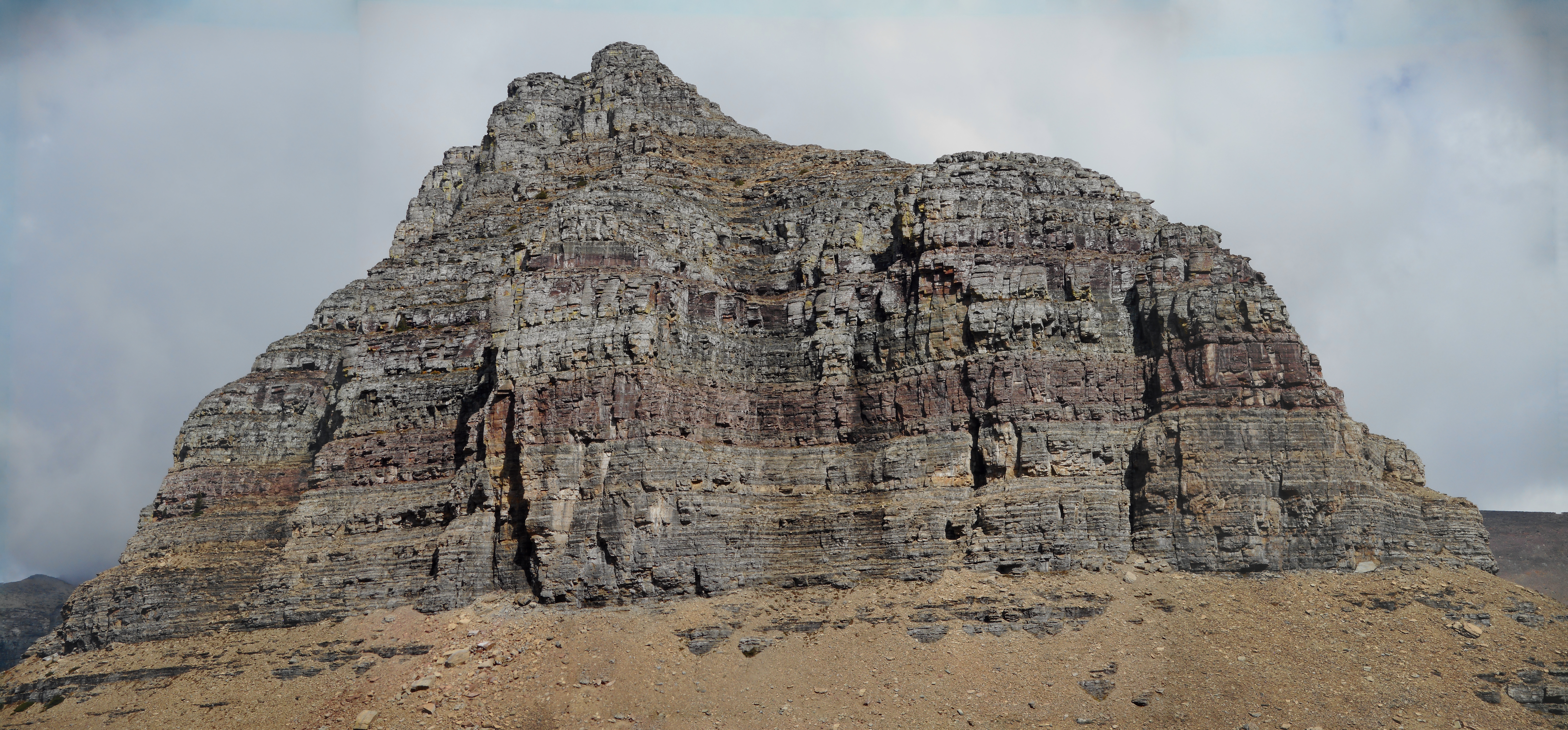
Snowslip Formation, numerous beds of dolomitic siltite, dolomite, and stromatolites and gray to greenish-gray, very fine grained quartzite beds

Much of the sedimentation probably occurred between about 1450 and 1400 Ma (million years) ago. Sedimentary structures are well preserved in most of the Belt rocks despite their great age. The sedimentation is unusual in that 1) there is an abundance of fine-grained sediment and very little coarser sediment, 2) there is a lack of sequence boundaries that are common in Phanerozoic sediments, and 3) cyclic and rhythmic deposition occurred over long periods of time. The Belt Supergroup is also noted for "Molar Tooth" structures in carbonates (a bacterial degassing structure) and various types of stromatolites.

== Paleogeography and environment of deposition ==
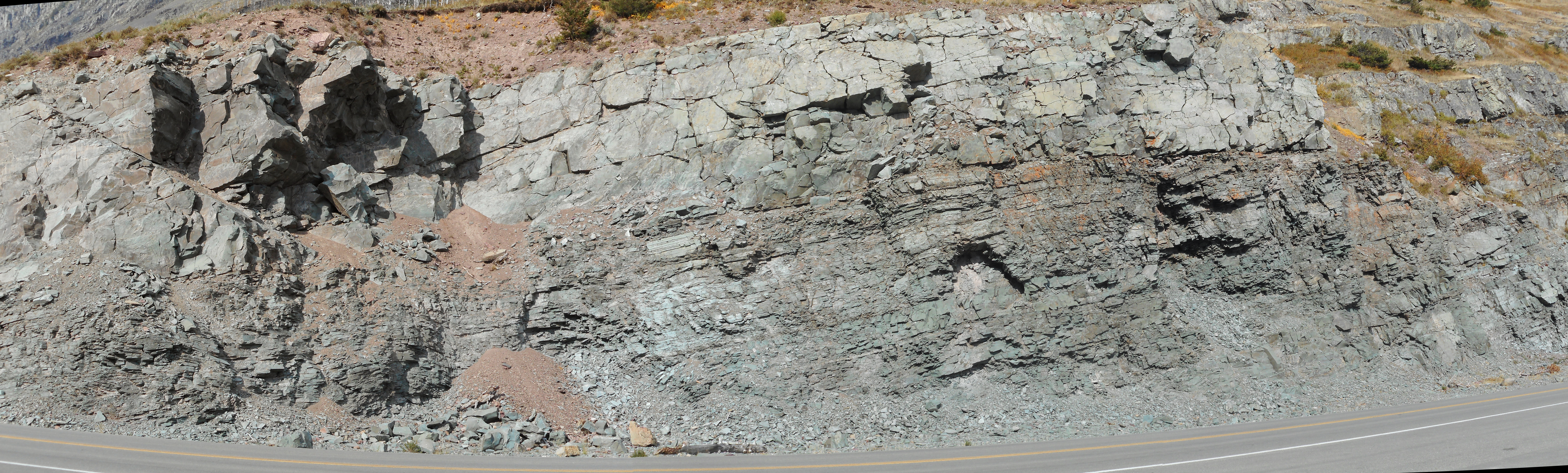
Helena Formation, thin to thick beds of gray to dark gray argillaceous dolomite, gray limestone

Paleogeographic reconstructions indicate that the Belt Supergroup accumulated in a fault-bounded rift basin that existed where the North American craton and another landmass were joined in a supercontinent called Columbia/Nuna. The basin appears to have been a closed "lacustrine" environment, or at least not completely open marine. Depositional environments are thought to have ranged from ancient floodplains and exposed mudflats to deep water.

Evidence of the basin-bounding faults exists on all sides of the Belt basin except the west, which rifted away during subsequent continental breakup. The identity of the joined landmass remains controversial. The Siberian craton, Australia and eastern Antarctica have all been suggested based rock ages and paleomagnetic information.

== Stratigraphy and distribution ==
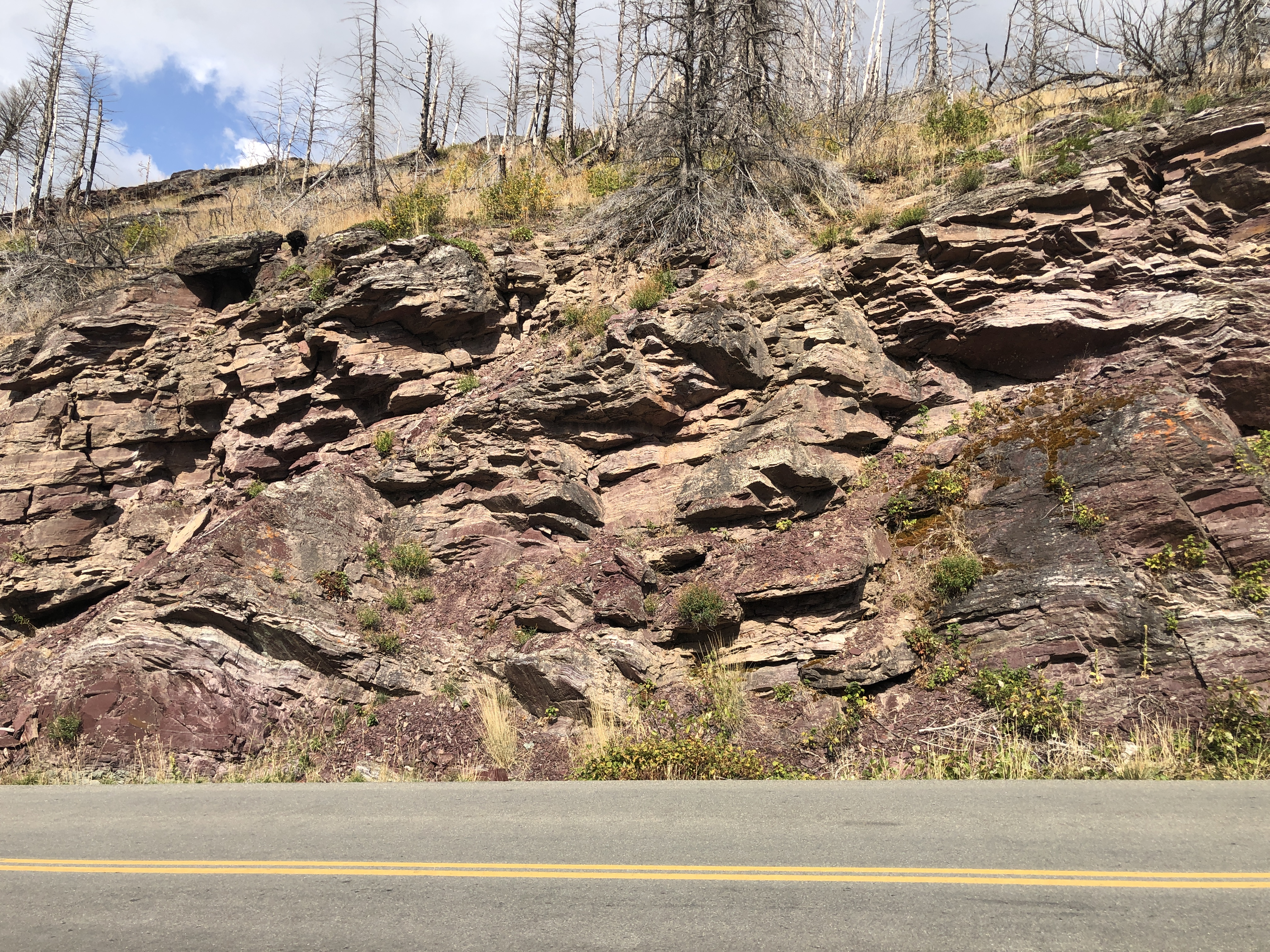
Grinnell Formation, quartz-rich of interlayered red argillite and siltite characterized by mudcracks and interstratified with abundant white, crossbedded quartzite and sandstone.

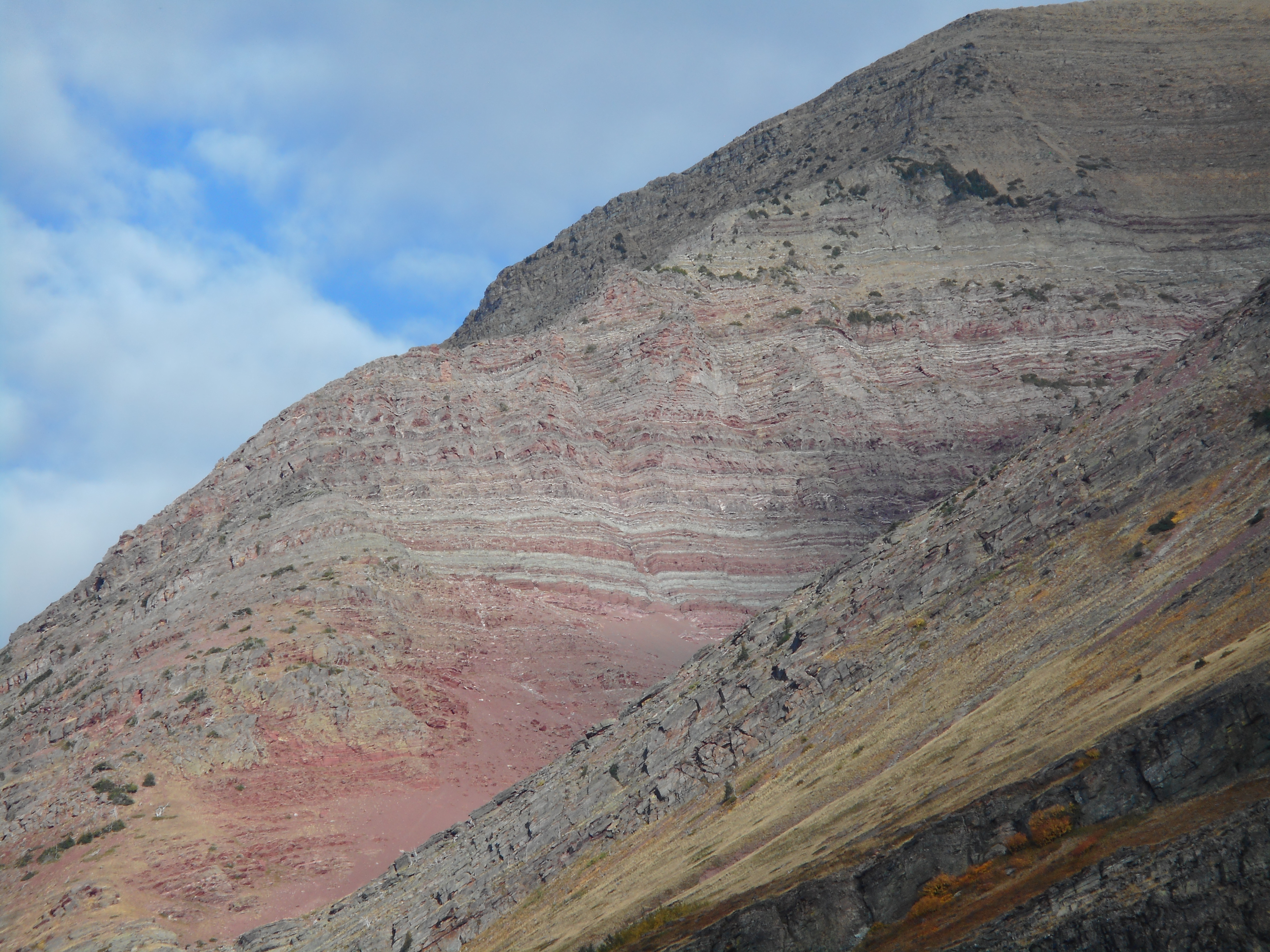
Appekunny Formation, green and red argillite and siltite and moderate amounts of light-gray quartzite. Divided into five informal members.

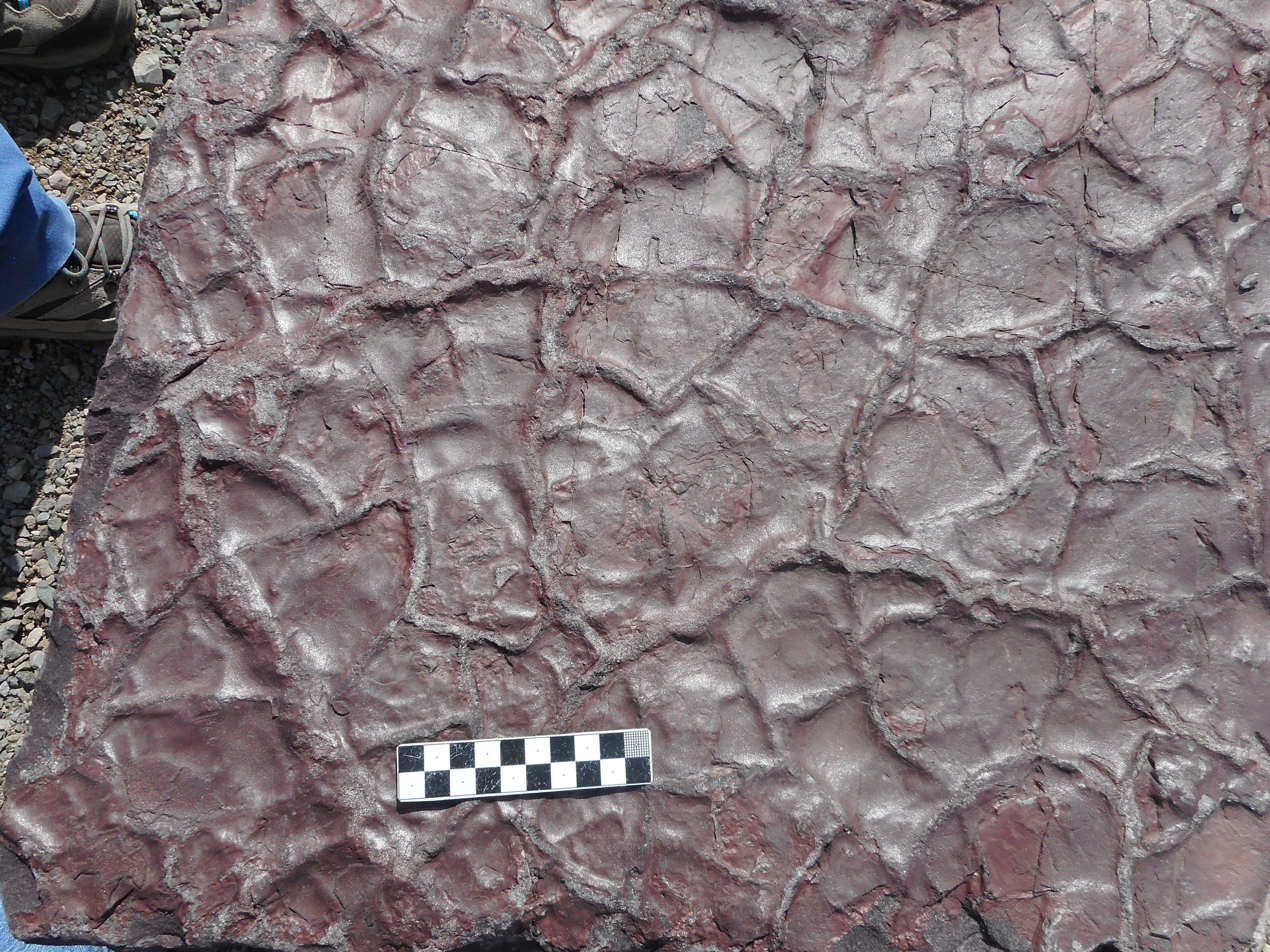
Grinnell Formation, mudcracks in red siltite

The Belt Supergroup was deposited unconformably on Archean and Paleoproterozoic rocks. It reaches thicknesses of more than 15 kilometres (10 mi) and is present in western Montana and northern Idaho, with minor occurrences in northeastern Washington and western Wyoming. Because of this widespread extent, the rock types and formation names of the Belt Supergroup vary depending upon location. In western Montana and northern Idaho the Belt is divided into the following four groups (youngest to oldest):

- Missoula Group – Fluvial sands and muds derived from the south.
- Piegan Group (Middle Belt Carbonate) – Carbonate muds alternating with laminae of clastic muds.
- Ravalli Group – Subaerially deposited sands and muds, mostly fluvial, derived from the southwest.
- Lower Belt – Heterogeneous coarse- to fine-grained clastic and carbonate rocks, mostly deep-water deposition with sediments derived from the southwest, and mafic sills.

The Belt Supergroup extends into Canada where the equivalent rocks are called the Purcell Supergroup, and are exposed in southeastern British Columbia and southwestern Alberta.

The Belt Supergroup currently overlies softer Cretaceous age rock that is about 1300 million years younger. This apparent violation of the law of superposition was caused by the Lewis Overthrust.

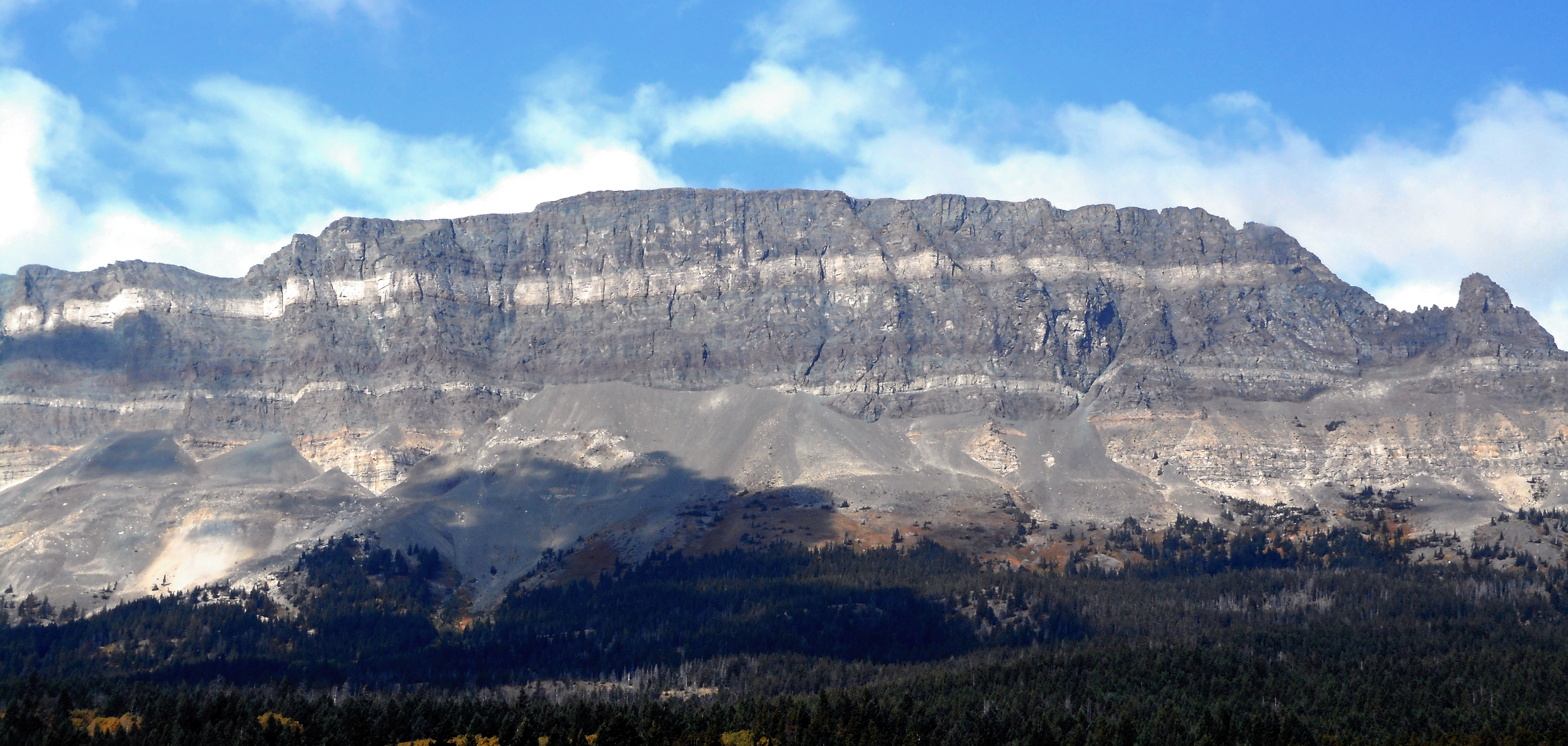
Appekunny Formation with white bands of quartzite overlying the Altyn Formation of slope forming buff, light-gray, dark-gray, and orange dolomite, argillaceous dolomite, and stomatolitic limestone

== Economic resources ==
The Belt Supergroup rocks host a variety of economically significant deposits of lead, zinc, silver, copper, gold, and other metals. These include the Coeur d'Alene lead–zinc–silver mining district in Idaho, which has produced about 7,400,000 tons of lead, 2,900,000 tons of zinc, and 35,600 tons of silver. The equivalent rocks of the Purcell Supergroup in British Columbia include the Sullivan ore body, which has also been a major producer of lead, zinc, and silver.
