= Sedimentary exhalative deposits =

Zinc-lead deposits

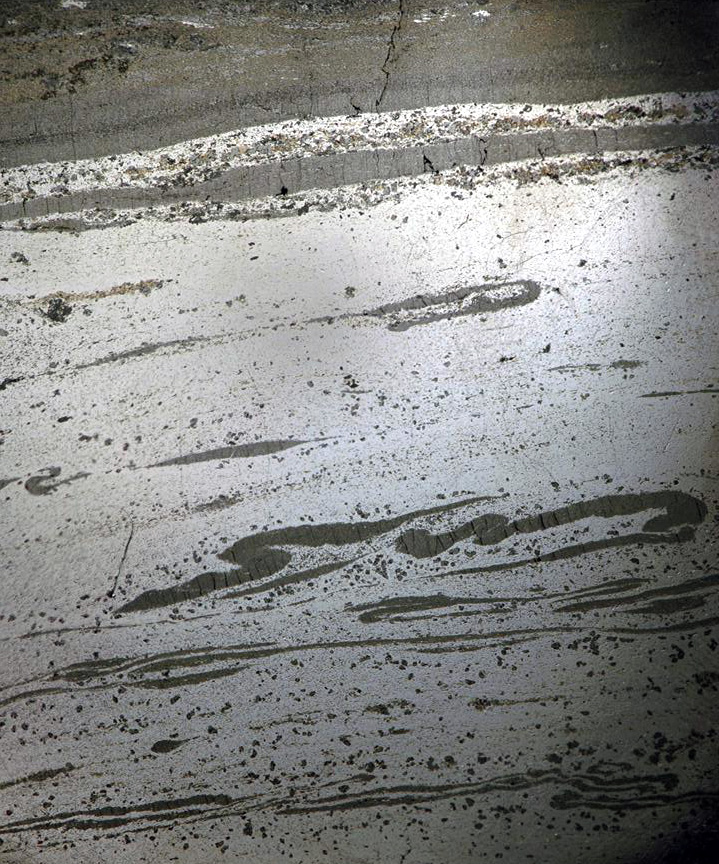
Banded massive sulfide (silver-lead-zinc ore) from the SEDEX Sullivan deposit in British Columbia, Canada (Mesoproterozoic, 1470 Ma) showing apparent soft-sediment deformation (field of view: about 3.9 cm across)

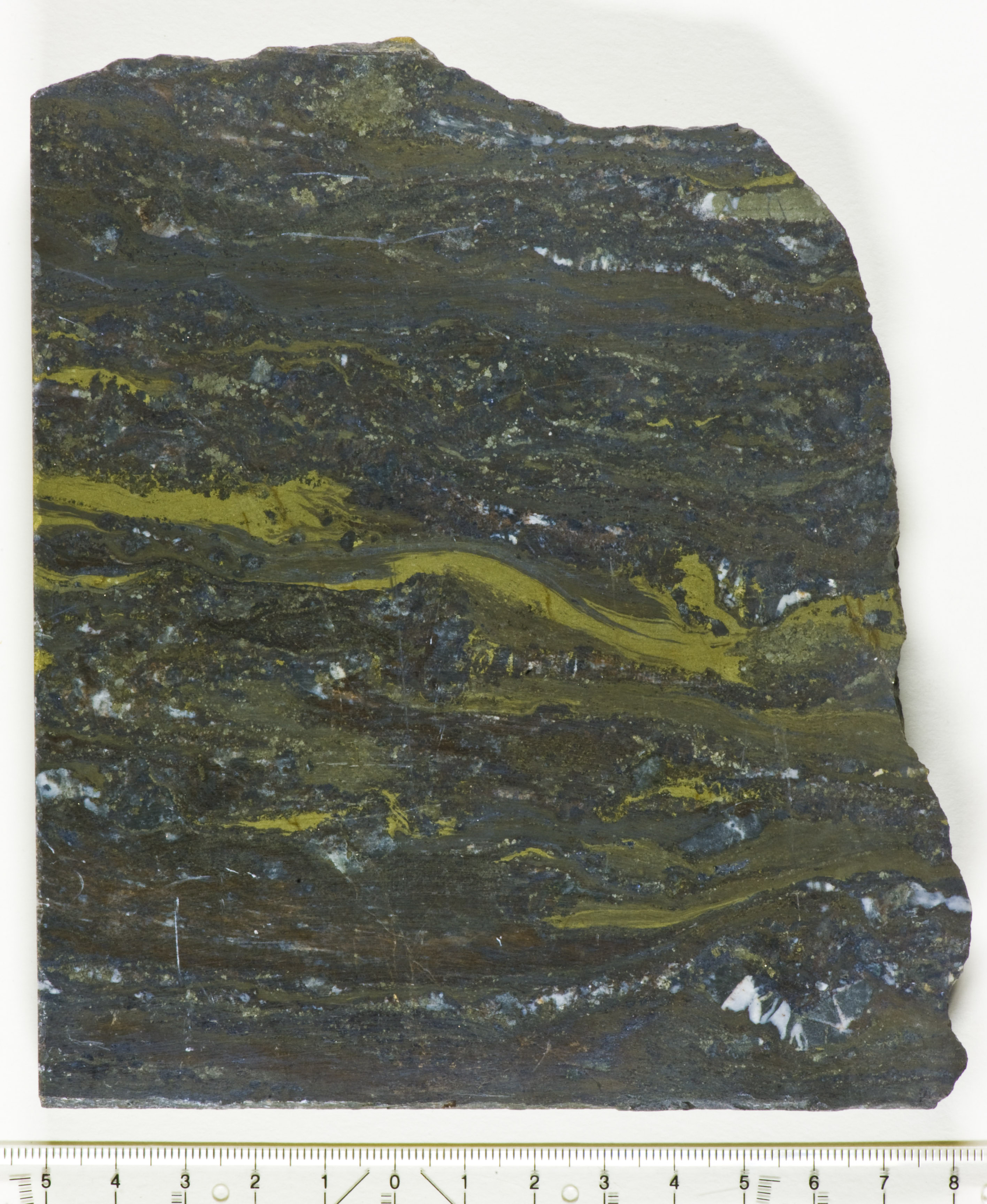
Banded ore with chalcopyrite, galena, sphalerite, pyrite from the SEDEX Rammelsberg deposit, Germany

Sedimentary exhalative deposits (SEDEX or SedEx deposits) are zinc-lead deposits originally interpreted to have been formed by discharge of metal-bearing basinal fluids onto the seafloor resulting in the precipitation of mainly stratiform ore, often with thin laminations of sulfide minerals. SEDEX deposits are hosted largely by clastic rocks deposited in intracontinental rifts or failed rift basins and passive continental margins. Since these ore deposits frequently form massive sulfide lenses, they are also named sediment-hosted massive sulfide deposits, as opposed to volcanic-hosted massive sulfide (VHMS) deposits. The sedimentary appearance of the thin laminations led to early interpretations that the deposits formed exclusively or mainly by exhalative processes onto the seafloor, hence the term SEDEX. However, recent study of numerous deposits indicates that shallow subsurface replacement is also an important process, in several deposits the predominant one, with only local if any exhalations onto the seafloor. For this reason, some authors prefer the term clastic-dominated zinc-lead deposits. As used today, therefore, the term SEDEX is not to be taken to mean that hydrothermal fluids actually vented into the overlying water column, although this may have occurred in some cases.

Main ore minerals in SEDEX deposits are fine-grained sphalerite and galena, chalcopyrite is significant in some deposits; silver-bearing sulfosalts are frequent minor constituents; pyrite is always present and can be a minor component or the dominant sulfide, as it is the case in massive sulfide bodies; barite content is common to absent, locally economic.

SEDEX deposits are typified, among others, by Red Dog, McArthur River, Mount Isa, Rammelsberg, Sullivan. SEDEX deposits are the most important source of lead and zinc, and a major contributor of silver and copper.

== Genetic model ==
=== Fluid and metal sources ===
The source of metals and mineralizing solutions for SEDEX deposits is deep formational saline waters and brines that leach metals from clastic sedimentary rocks and the underlying basement. The fluids derived their salinity from the evaporation of seawater and may have been mixed with meteoric water and pore water squeezed out of the sediments. Metals such as lead, copper and zinc are found in a trace amount in clastic and magmatic rocks.

Saline waters may reach temperatures higher than 200°C in deeper parts of the basin. Hydrothermal fluid compositions are estimated to have a salinity of up to 23% NaCl eq. Hot, moderately acidic, saline waters, are able to carry significant amounts of lead, zinc, silver and other metals.

=== Deposition ===
The mineralizing fluids are conducted upwards along permeable feeders, in particular basin-bounding faults. Feeders which host the hydrothermal flow can show evidence of this flow due to development of hydrothermal breccias, quartz and carbonate veining and pervasive ankerite-siderite-chlorite-sericite alteration. The feeders themselves do not need to be mineralized

Near the seafloor, beneath or onto it, the ascending metal-bearing fluids eventually cool down and may mix with cold slightly alkaline, less saline seawater triggering precipitation of metal sulfides. If mixing takes place subseafloor, extensive replacement develops. If the discharge is onto the seafloor, stratiform deposits of chemical precipitates may form. In an ideal exhalative model, hot dense brines flow to depressed areas of the ocean topography where they mix with cooler, less dense, sea water, causing the dissolved metal and sulfur in the brine to precipitate from solution as a solid metal sulfide ore, deposited as layers of sulfide sediment.

The ultimate source of reduced sulfur is seawater sulfate. Sulfate reduction (through thermochemical sulfate reduction, bacterial sulfate reduction or both) to form sulfides may occur at the mineralization site, or, alternatively, metalliferous but reduced sulfur-poor fluids may mix with fluids enriched in hydrogen sulfide near the mineralization site and so trigger sulfide precipitation.

== Morphology ==
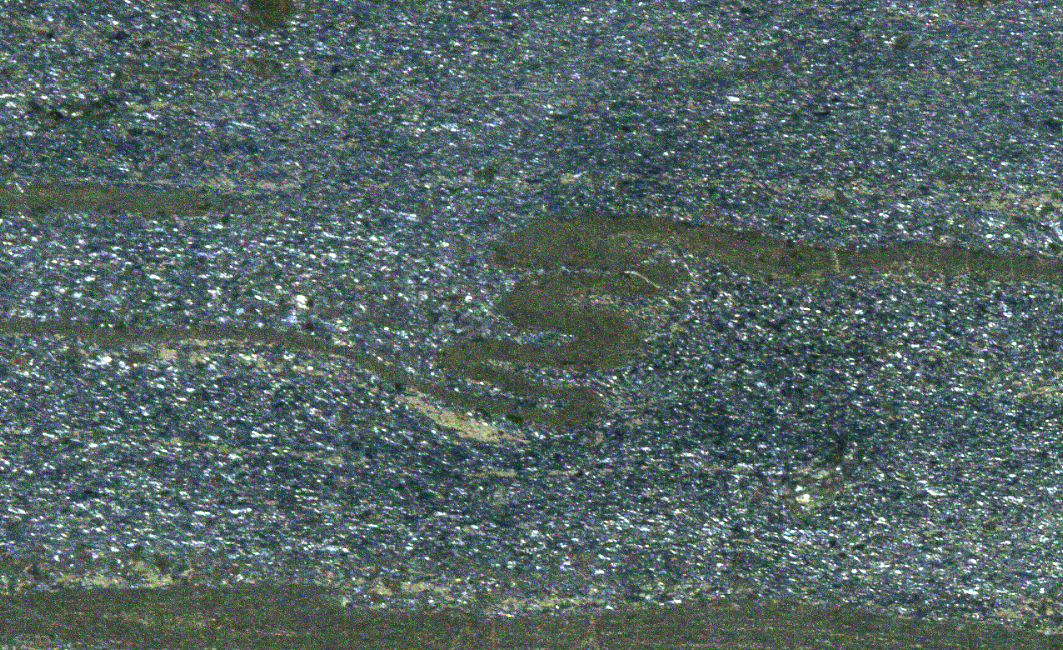
Banded massive sulfide (silver-lead-zinc ore) from the Sullivan Mine, British Columbia, showing apparent soft-sediment deformation. Sullivan mineralization is interpreted to be related to exhalative seafloor deposition.

Upon mixing of the ore fluids with the seawater, dispersed across the seafloor, the ore constituents and gangue minerals are precipitated onto the seafloor to form an orebody and mineralization halo which are congruent with the underlying stratigraphy and are generally fine grained, finely laminated and can be recognized as chemically deposited from solution.

Also replacement processes along permeable beds may produce stratiform morphologies. An example are arkosic strata adjacent to faults which feed heavy brines into the porous, permeable sediment, filling the matrix with sulfides. Mineralization is also developed in faults and feeder conduits which fed the mineralizing system. For instance, the Sullivan orebody in south-eastern British Columbia was developed within an interformational diatreme, caused by overpressuring of a lower sedimentary unit and eruption of the fluids through another unit en route to the seafloor.

Within disturbed and tectonized sequences, SEDEX mineralization behaves similarly to other massive sulfide deposits, being a low-competence low shear strength layer within more rigid silicate sedimentary rocks. As such, boudinage structures, dikes of sulfides, vein sulfides and hydrothermally remobilized and enriched portions or peripheries of SEDEX deposits are individually known from amongst the various examples worldwide.

Following the discovery of hydrothermal vents, deposits similar to those of oceanic vents and fossilized vent life forms have been found in some SEDEX deposits.

== Problems of classification ==
SEDEX deposits belong to the large class of non-magmatic hydrothermal ore deposits formed by basinal brines.

This class includes also:

- Mississippi valley type (MVT) zinc-lead deposits.
- Sediment-hosted stratiform Cu-Co-(Ag) deposit, typified by the Copperbelt of Zambia and DRC. The supergiant deposits of the Copperbelt are considered by some authors to be syndiagenetic copper mineralization formed at arkose-shale interfaces within sedimentary sequences, whereas for other authors these deposits formed many million years after sedimentation, during the Lufilian Cambrian orogeny (~540–490 Ma)

As discussed above, one of the major problems in classifying SEDEX deposits has been in identifying whether or not the ore was definitively exhaled into the ocean and whether the source was formational brines from sedimentary basins. In many cases the overprint of metamorphism and faulting, generally thrust faulting, deforms and disturbs the sediments and obscures the original fabrics.

== Specific examples of deposits ==
=== Sullivan lead-zinc mine ===
The Sullivan Mine in British Columbia was worked for 105 years and produced 16,000,000 tonnes of lead and zinc, as well as 9,000 tonnes of silver. It was Canada's longest lived continuous mining operation and produced metals worth over $20 billion in terms of 2005 metal prices. Grading was in excess of 5% Pb and 6% Zn.

The ore genesis of the Sullivan ore body is summarized by the following process:

- Sediments were deposited in an extensional second-order sedimentary basin during extension.
- Earlier, deeply buried sediments devolved fluids into a deep reservoir of sandy siltstones and sandstones.
- Intrusion of dolerite sills into the sedimentary basin raised the geothermal gradient locally.
- Raised temperatures prompted overpressuring of the lower sedimentary reservoir which breached overlying sediments, forming a breccia diatreme.
- Mineralizing fluid flowed upwards through the concave feeder zone of the breccia diatreme, discharging onto the seafloor. Beneath the seafloor, Aldridge sediments were replaced by an tourmaline "pipe" (650 m by 1300 m by 400 m thick) characterized by a well-developed network of pyrrhotite-minor quartz-carbonate veins and veinlets, marking the feeder zone for the deposit.
- Ore fluids debouched onto the seafloor and pooled in a second-order sub-basin's depocentre, precipitating a stratiform massive sulfide layer from 3 to 8 m thick, with exhalative chert, manganese and probable K-bearing hydrothermal clays. The central area of the exhalitive massive sulfides lying above the feeder zone became progressively replaced by massive pyrrhotite-chlorite alteration. Ongoing fluid flow and precipitation in the feeder zone eventually led to its sealing and diversion of fluid flow to the ring-shaped surrounding Transition Zone (TZ) characterized by sericite/muscovite alteration and increased levels of As, Sb, and Ag. Later pyrite replacement of the orebody was associated with albite-chlorite alteration in both the underlying tourmalinite pipe and the ore zone, and development of an albitite body in the overlying sediments. This later, lower temperature hydrothermal alteration was associated with ongoing underlying intrusion of Moyie gabbro sills, which were likely the heat engines to drive hydrothermal circulation.
