= Sullivan Mine =

Mine in Kimberley, British Columbia, Canada

- Location in Canada
- Location: Kimberley, British Columbia; 49°41′18″N 115°59′19″W
- Products: Zinc; Lead; Silver
- Discovered: 1892
- Opened: 1909
- Closed: 2001
- Company: Teck Cominco
- Website: Sullivan Mine

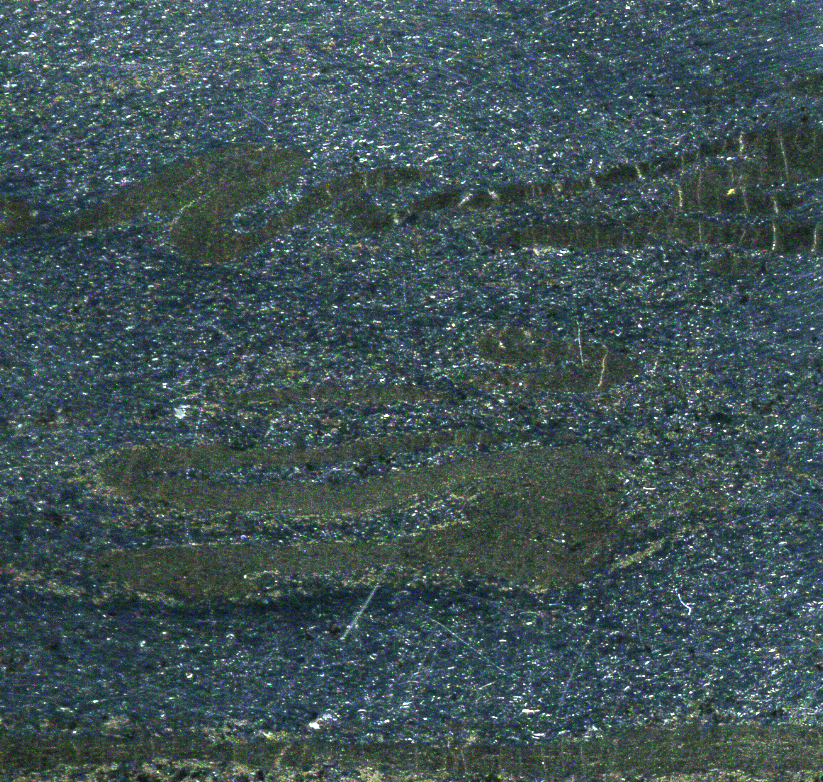
Banded massive sulfide silver-lead-zinc ore from the Sullivan Mine. Very dark gray = argentiferous galena (Pb,Ag)S. Dark grayish brown bands = sphalerite (ZnS). Dull brassy wisps = pyrrhotite (Fe1-xS). Specimen is about 2.3 cm (1 inch) wide.

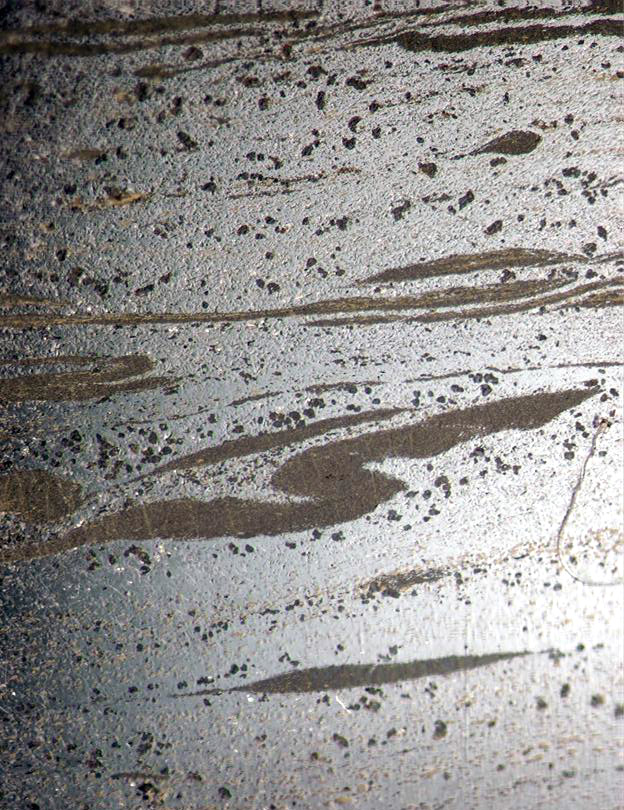
Closeup photo of banded massive sulfide (silver-lead-zinc ore) from the Sullivan mine. Field of view is about 2 cm across. Silvery-gray = argentiferous galena (Pb,Ag)S. Very dark bands = sphalerite (ZnS). The folded and contorted bedding is from soft-sediment slumping.

The Sullivan Mine is a now-closed conventional–mechanized underground mine located in Kimberley, British Columbia, Canada. The ore body is a complex, sediment-hosted, sedimentary exhalative deposit consisting primarily of zinc, lead, and iron sulphides. Lead, zinc, silver and tin were the economic metals produced. The deposit lies within the lower part of the Purcell Supergroup and mineralization occurred about 1470 million years ago during the late Precambrian (Mesoproterozoic).

The deposit was discovered in 1892 and acquired in 1909 by the CPR-owned Consolidated Mining and Smelting Company of Canada (later Cominco Ltd. and Teck Cominco). The mine's economic success resulted largely from Sullivan's 1916 development of the differential flotation process that allowed separate recovery of lead and zinc concentrates in the milling process. This technology, developed by Trail operations at Sullivan, has been used worldwide for various types of ore bodies. In its lifetime, the mine produced over 160 million tons of ore containing 8 million tons of lead, 7 million tons of zinc, and 285 million troy ounces (8.9×10^{9} g) of silver, which were together worth more than $20 billion. After 92 years of active production, the Sullivan Mine was closed in 2001. Since then Teck Cominco has been undertaking an extensive decommissioning and reclamation process at the site.

== Geological setting ==
The Sullivan ore body is a complex sedimentary exhalative (SedEx) deposit that consists primarily of zinc, lead, and iron sulphides. It is hosted in the sedimentary rocks of the Aldridge Formation in the lower part of the Purcell Supergroup. The rocks were deposited on the sea floor in an intracontinental rift basin above a thermal anomaly that drove the circulation of brines. Fractures and breccia zones provided conduits for metal-rich, sulfur-poor brines from depth, and sulfide minerals formed when the metals combined with sulfur from marine brines. Mineralization occurred about 1470 million years ago during late Precambrian (Mesoproterozoic) time. The sulfide and silicate mineral assemblages were later modified by metamorphism.

== Mining operations and accidents ==
=== Conventional mining ===
Conventional mining referred to the original part of operations of the Sullivan Mine, where miners drilled and moved ore by hand and with small equipment. The ore was then shipped via an extensive 3 ft (914 mm) narrow gauge underground rail system which led to the surface and then on to the Marysville concentrator. At one time there were more than 5,600 feet (1,700 m) of rail underground. Conventional tunnels were standard 8 by 8 ft (2.438 by 2.438 m) square. There was also a rail man-carrier that brought men in and out of the mine, descending on a sled full of chairs at a 60 degree bank. The railway system went everywhere underground, and ore was sent by rail to crushing chambers. The Sullivan mine had three such chambers where ore was initially crushed in order to begin to process it into its separate components, and debris was separated from the crushed ore. These impressive chambers were belt driven and had well-lit stations where men would monitor and maintain the process and machinery. There were two main crushers, and the third was smaller. Much of the railroad track and equipment is now used at the nearby Kimberley's Underground Mining Railway attraction.

Many accidents causing injury and death occurred on the conventional side. "Hot Muck", a rare occurrence of ore with high concentrations of sulfur, would glow red and white and release amazing amounts of heat and gas when exposed to air. Miners at that time had to wear special protective suits while they processed this ore.

=== Mechanized mining ===
Mechanized mining refers to using heavy equipment to speed up the mining process. The first attempt at a mechanized 10 by 10 ft (3.05 by 3.05 m) tunnel was around 1975. Referred to as '4250' (level) was collared and connected to the conventional rail drift in 1976. Much of the area was widened, tracks taken out, and a junction was created at 3900 level with three separate tunnels. One tunnel went to a massive repair facility '#7' and garage for servicing underground equipment. In 1979 #1 tunnel, which became the main tunnel, was collared and a new drift created at 4800 level to recover silver at the top of the mine. Heavy equipment including jumbos, various air or electric scoop trams in 2 to 8 yards (1.8 to 7.3 m) configurations, rockbolt jumbos, giraffes, shotcrete machines, Hiabs, mancarriers, dozers, graders, and jeeps were used. Rockbreakers, downhole drills, fan drills, long hole drills, and TNT drills were some of the equipment used to drill for blasting tunnel faces. As the mining for ore pillars continued, most shops were moved above ground for safety.

There was a small open pit facility at the top of the mine that was used for the extraction of iron that was shipped to Vancouver. There was a Cominco steel plant on site, right next to the fertilizer plant. It was in operation until the boiler blew and killed some workers. It was decided to cease steel production and farm out that part of operations. The remnants of the Cominco steel plant were then destroyed.

With one exception, mechanized mining never mined in virgin territory. Conventional mining created huge pillars as miners extracted ore and left massive supports to hold up the ceilings of the drifts. Mechanized miners had the responsibility of removing such pillars, also full of ore, until none remained.

The exception to never mining in virgin territory came with the South East Fringe. 2600 level was the last of the original ore body recovered. After this, decommissioned equipment could be purchased by companies or for personal use and a two-year process of decommissioning the mine and making it as environmentally and structurally safe as possible began. The pumps and fans were turned off and the mine flooded. It was the end of a more-than-100-year era for a very special mining facility. Rarely is an ore body rich enough to support such a large operation for so many years. This mine was the primary employer for the residents of the City of Kimberley perched on top of all of these tunnels.

=== Exploration ===
As of December 2008, Abitibi Mining Corporation (ABB: TSXV) is exploring along the Sullivan vein in the Nelson Mining District of the East Kootenay mountains. The company, with its partners, are currently drilling the Sullivan horizon and Sullivan sub-basin.

== Decommissioned mine accident ==
On May 17, 2006, four people died in an accident at the decommissioned mine. Douglas Erickson, a contractor who was doing routine water sampling, was overcome by lack of oxygen. Two days later, after being reported missing, he was found by Teck Cominco employee Robert Newcombe, who was able to dial 9-1-1 before also succumbing to the oxygen depleted atmosphere. The two paramedics that responded, Kim Weitzel and Shawn Currier, also died in the oxygen-deprived atmosphere of the shed. The bodies were recovered by firefighters equipped with breathing apparatus. The victims succumbed to asphyxiation in an archetypal confined space accident.
