= Massive sulfide deposits =

Massive sulfide deposits are ore deposits that have significant stratiform ore bodies consisting mainly of sulfide minerals. Most massive sulfide ore deposits have other portions that are not massive, including stringer or feeder zones beneath the massive parts that mostly consist of crosscutting veins and veinlets of sulfides in a matrix of pervasively altered host rock and gangue.

The term "massive sulfide" is mainly applied to the following classes of ore deposits:

- Volcanogenic massive sulfide ore deposits (VMS), also called volcanic-hosted massive sulfide deposits (VHMS)
- Sedimentary exhalative deposits (SEDEX), also called sediment-hosted massive sulfide deposits

The main sulfide minerals occurring in both classes of massive sulfide ores are pyrite and/or pyrrhotite and variable amounts of sphalerite, galena, and chalcopyrite.

The term "massive sulfide deposit" became popular in the 1960s with the discovery of seafloor massive sulfide deposits that were recognized as modern equivalents of ancient volcanic-hosted massive sulfide ore deposits (VHMS or VMS). Subsequently, the term was also widely used since the 1970s for sediment-hosted ore deposits when it was realized that sediment-hosted massive sulfide (SHMS) Zn-Pb deposits could be formed from ascending and eventually venting brines that are geochemically similar to those that form MVT deposits.

The limit of what is "massive sulfide" has changed with time. One of the original definitions (1976) stated that the "term massive refers to mineralization composed of greater than 60% sulfides".

This limit was kept in a comprehensive definition of 1981: "Massive sulfide deposits are strata-bound and in part stratiform accumulations of sulfide minerals which are normally composed of at least 60% sulfide minerals in their stratiform portions. The stratiform portion may comprise up to 100% of the total sulfide present, but many deposits have a substantial component of discordant vein-type sulfide mineralization, the stringer zone, mainly in the footwall strata."

In recent times a limit of 40% sulfides has been more common.
