= Petrological Database of the Ocean Floor =

The Petrological Database of the Ocean Floor (PetDB) is a relational database for global geochemical data on igneous and metamorphic rocks generated at mid-ocean ridges including back-arc basins, young seamounts, and old oceanic crust, as well as ophiolites and terrestrial xenoliths from the mantle and lower crust and diamond geochemistry. These data are obtained by analyses of whole rock powders, volcanic glasses, and minerals by a wide range of techniques including mass spectrometry, atomic emission spectrometry, x-ray fluorescence spectrometry, and wet chemical analyses. Data are compiled from the scientific literature by PetDB data managers, and entered after methodical metadata review. Members of the scientific community can also suggest entry of specific data that has been entered into the EarthChem Library. PetDB is administered by the EarthChem group under the Integrated Earth Data Applications (IEDA) facility at the Lamont–Doherty Earth Observatory headed by K. Lehnert. PetDB is supported by the U.S. National Science Foundation.

== About ==
Developments of PetDB began in 1995, by Lamont–Doherty Earth Observatory (LDEO) scientists C. Langmuir (now at Harvard University), W. Ryan, and A. Boulanger, when they realized what impact the World Wide Web and relational databases could have on the use of scientific data in research and in the classroom.

The initial funding phase of PetDB (1996–2001) supported the development of the database structure and population with data values. Renewed funding (2002–2007) permitted the migration of the database into an ORACLE-based environment administered by the Center for International Earth Science Information Network (CIESIN) of Columbia University, continued data entry, and enhancement of the web-interface with a more user-friendly design.

PetDB is now maintained by EarthChem and funded by the US National Science Foundation, and is governed by the Interdisciplinary Earth Data Alliance facility as part of an ecosystem of related projects, including The System for Earth Sample Registration (SESAR), and the Astromaterials Data System (AstroMat).

Since its inception, PetDB has supported a wide array of scientific endeavors, providing easy access to a comprehensive global dataset of geochemical data for mid-ocean ridge basalts, abyssal peridotites and also xenolith samples from the Earth's mantle and lower crust.

The relational database structure of PetDB is a sample-based implementation, and designed to accommodate chemical, isotopic and mineralogical data for any type of rock sample, along with essential metadata, which provide information about each sample (e.g. location and time of collection, taxonomy, petrographic description) and the data quality, including analytical procedure, reference standard measurements etc. (Lehnert et al. 2000).

Initially developed for PetDB and its European counterpart, GEOROC, this relational data model has demonstrated utility and flexibility by its application in subsequent geochemical database projects including several collaborations that PetDB has also fostered, including EARThD Project, which focuses on tephra samples from the East African Rift; the US Polar Rock Repository housed at Ohio State University, which includes metadata from Antarctic rock samples; and the collaboration with the University of Kansas, which has resulted in the inclusion of North American granitic pluton samples’ data as well. This project evolved from the NAVDAT project.

PetDB has been cited in more than 1500 peer-reviewed scientific articles.

PetDB is committed to data that follow: FAIR (Findable, Accessible, Interoperable, and Reusable), TRUST (Transparency, Responsibility, User focus, Sustainability and Technology), and CARE principles for Indigenous Data Governance (Collective benefit, Authority to Control, Responsibility, Ethics), and strives to demonstrate the importance of openly available digital resources across all scientific disciplines.

== Contents ==
In its current application, PetDB contains and provides on-line access to a complete set of chemical parameters (currently over 250 elements, oxides, isotopes and isotope ratios), as well as petrographic (mode) data through a sophisticated query interface. New data are continuously being added to the database as it is published and submitted to PetDB by authors. Data for a specific sample that is generated by different laboratories or published by various authors are linked and integrated through the use of a unique sample identifier generated by the database application.

== Statistics ==
As of November 15, 2024, PetDB holdings consist of:

- References: 3,680
- Samples: 141,527
- Bulk rock data points: 1,796,265
- Minerals: 3,549,654
- Volcanic glasses: 937,401
- Inclusions: 354,156
- Total individual values: 6,639,789

== Data output ==
Data from PetDB can be viewed in HTML tables and downloaded in spreadsheets in XLS format. During selection of chemical parameters a user can choose to retrieve data as individual values (each row in the data table contains values measured on the same sample with the same method and linked to the same reference) or in precompiled format. The precompiled format arranges all data associated with a sample in a single row, even when data is sourced from multiple publications. In cases where there is more than one data value for a particular chemical item, the precompilation algorithm selects the most recent analysis and the most precise method available. Links in the HTML table permit the user to access more detailed information about the sample, reference or data value (analytical procedure). The final spreadsheet output contains two worksheets. The first contains queried chemical data, geospatial coordinates, and abridged methods and references, while the second contains metadata on analytical methods and publication information.
