= Alice Wegmann =

Brazilian actress (born 1995)

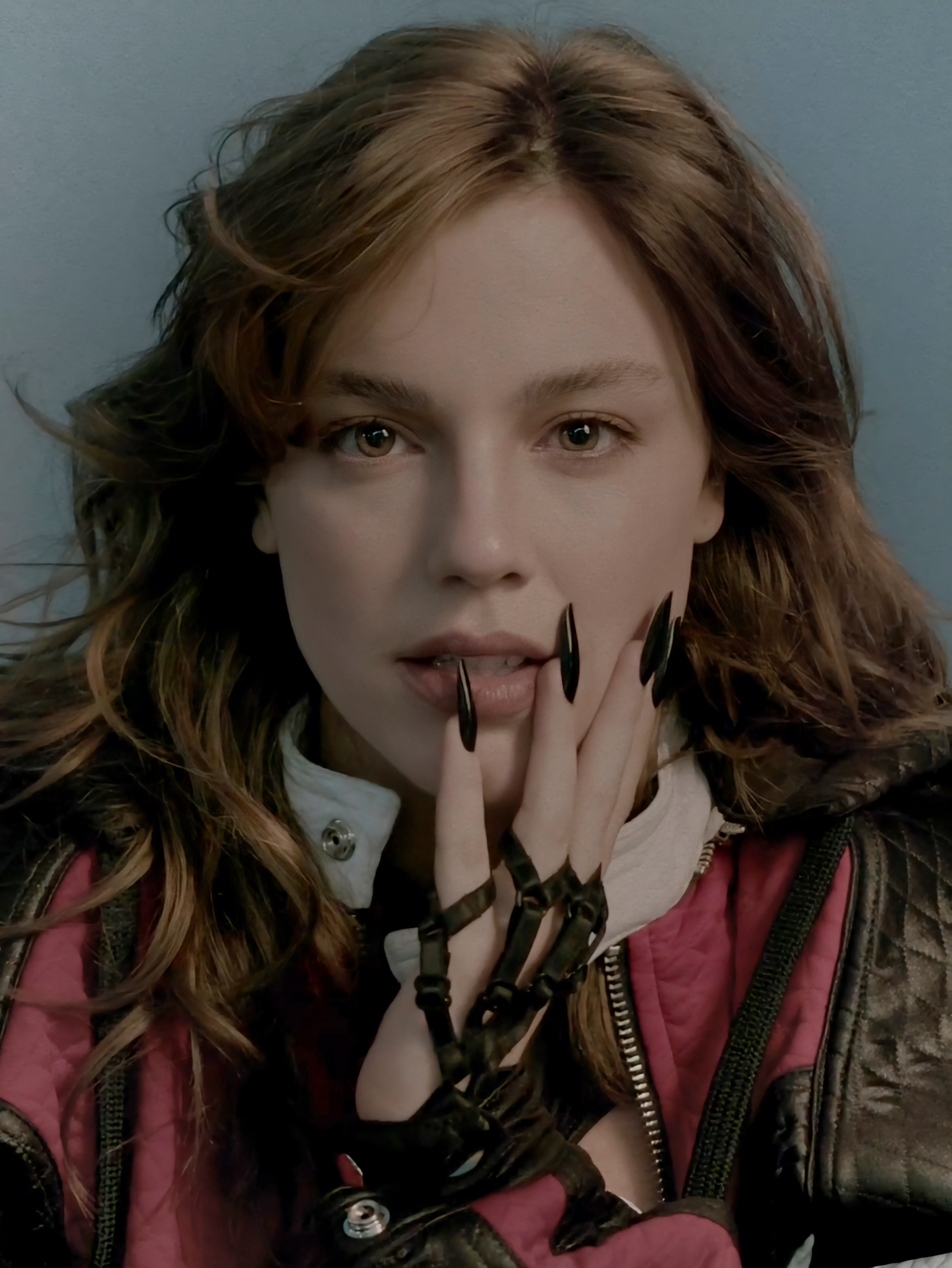
- Wegmann in 2023
- Born: Alice Wegmann Corrêa; November 3, 1995 (age 30); Rio de Janeiro, Brazil
- Education: Pontifical Catholic University of Rio de Janeiro
- Occupation: Actress
- Years active: 2008–present
- Height: 1.64 m (5 ft 5 in)

Alice Wegmann Corrêa (born November 3, 1995) is a Brazilian actress.

== Biography ==
She is the daughter of Paulo Corrêa and Adriana Wegmann and sister of Marcos Wegmann. Carioca, as a child, Alice lived at the age of 2 in Campinas and also in the Rio Vermelho neighborhood in Salvador, cities where her father was transferred. At the age of 3, Alice started practicing Olympic Gymnastics, Surfing, Dancing, Tennis, Swimming, Running and Football. The actress was even trained by the champion brothers Daniele Hypólito and Diego Hypolito, where she trained with them and Jade Barbosa at Clube do Flamengo. At the age of 8, she even participated in a Brazilian championship for Flamengo in the Brazilian Artistic Gymnastics Championship in two disciplines, vault and floor exercise, placing second in the team classification. In 2018, she graduated in Social Communication - Advertising at the Pontifical Catholic University of Rio de Janeiro (PUC-Rio), where she entered in the second semester of 2013, combining the course with soap operas and series that she did.

== Career ==
=== Early career (2007–2011) ===
At the age of 11, in 2007, she joined the Tablado theater, where she studied theater for 4 years. On the stage, she acted in the plays A Guerra de Tróia (2007), O Inspector Geral (2008), Tribobó City (2009) and Feitiço da Vila – Noel Rosa (2010). Outside of Tablado, she made her stage debut in 2008 with the play A Casa da Madrinha by Lygia Bojunga, adapted by Susana Garcia and Herson Capri. In 2010, she completed her training at Tablado and the following year, at just 15 years old, she made her television debut playing the cool teenager Andrea in the 18th season of Malhação. Still in 2011, she played tennis player Sofia in the second phase of the soap opera A Vida da Gente. because of this she was able to show her sporting side, which Alice had practiced since childhood.

=== 2010s ===
In 2012 and 2013, she had her first starring role in the 20th season of Malhação, playing Lia Martins, a rebellious student, angry at having been abandoned by her mother, Raquel, has already undergone therapy and now analyzes herself by playing her guitar. Her character ends up getting involved in a love triangle with her best friend, Ju, and Dinho, the school's womanizer. In the plot, Alice, in addition to playing the guitar, also sang two new songs for the plot, "Amo Assim" and "Sozinha em Minha Companhia". In the same year, she played the cheerful and explosive Bárbara in the romantic comedy Conto de Verão, written by Domingos de Oliveira. In 2013, Alice participated in the music video "Quero te Encontrar" by the duo Anselmo & Rafael. In 2014, Alice made her debut at 9pm in the second phase of the soap opera Em Família, playing the role of the jealous villain Shirley, a character played by Vivianne Pasmanter in her youth, and recorded her first film Tamo Junto, directed by Matheus Souza. Between the second half of 2014 and the first quarter of 2015, she played the young transgressor, Daniele, in the soap opera Boogie Oogie.

In 2016, she was one of the protagonists of the miniseries Ligações Perigosas, playing Cecília, a naive and romantic girl, who has lived in the convent for seven years and discovers love with Felipe, the character of Jesuíta Barbosa. In the same year, in the 9 o'clock soap opera, A Lei do Amor, she played the sweet Isabela, a young woman who was thrown out of a boat after a fight with her boyfriend Tiago, Humberto Carrão's character, and disappeared, but returns, disguised for much of the time. of the plot as the vengeful Marina, revealing her identity in the last chapter. In 2017, she played advisor Alice in the film O Rastro. In 2018, in the superseries Onde Nascem os Fortes in the interior of Paraíba, she played her most prominent role with the protagonist heroine Maria. In the scenes, the heroine overturned the stereotype of a traditional girl to uncover the disappearance of her twin brother, played by Marco Pigossi. In 2019, she joined the cast of the 6pm soap opera, Órfãos da Terra in the role of the Muslim, Dalila, the villain who goes to great lengths to separate the protagonists Jamil and Laila and avenge the death of her father, Sheik Aziz. She then acted in the year-end special Juntos a Magia Acontece and narrated the episode about Amelia Earhart for Fantástico's Mulheres Fantásticas. In the same year, she entered the "Under 30" list, chosen by Forbes magazine as one of the highlights of young Brazilians aged up to 30 in the "Dramatic Arts" category.

=== 2020s ===
In 2021, from September to November, in Goiânia, the actress recorded the series Rensga Hits, premiering in 2022, which talks about the sertanejo universe, playing the protagonist Raíssa Medeiros, a young woman from the countryside who discovers that she is being betrayed by her fiancé and leaves him at the altar, setting off towards her dream of living off sertanejo music in greater Goiânia. Raíssa will have a rivalry with another singer, Gláucia, played by Lorena Comparato, and will form a romantic couple with Enzo, the prince of suffering, played by Maurício Destri. The character will sing original songs made for the series such as "Desatola Bandida" and was inspired by the singer Marília Mendonça. In 2022, in October, she recorded the film A Vilã das Nove, produced by Star Original Productions. In 2023, from March to July, in Ceilândia, she recorded the series Justiça 2, playing one of the protagonists, Carolina, a young accountant, who for financial reasons, returns to her city to live with her mother, played by Julia Lemmertz. However, this brings her close to her uncle, played by Murilo Benício, who raped her as a teenager. She decides to report him and her family turns against her, she ends up taking over the family business, and after seven years, when he is released, she then begins her own revenge.

After a 12-year contract with TV Globo, she signed with Netflix, and in August she recorded in Buenos Aires, the series Senna, about Ayrton Senna, playing Lilian Vasconcellos, Ayrton's first and only wife, played by Gabriel Leone. From the end of August until February 2024, the actress recorded the second and third, and final season of the series Rensga Hits, in the new episodes, her character Raissa and her sister Gláucia are forced to unite to help their father recover. From August to September, she recorded the police action film Rio de Sangue in Pará, playing the doctor Luiza, who, together with an NGO, brings health to indigenous populations in the territories of Alto Tapajós, she ends up being kidnapped by prospectors and is the daughter of police officer Patrícia, played by Giovanna Antonelli, who is being sentenced to death by the high-ranking drug traffickers. In December, the recording of Vale Tudo remake began, playing Solange Duprat, a character that was played by Lídia Brondi in the 1988 version. Now the character will be the director of Tomorrow Magazine and will also suffer from diabetes. She also recorded as the character Solange a crossover, a guest appearance in an episode of the comedy series Encantado's.

== Personal life ==
In 2012 she had a brief relationship with actor and singer Arthur Aguiar. Between 2014 and 2016, she dated Pedro Malan for two years. In 2019, she dated artistic agent Miguel Ribas Gastal. In 2022, she dated instrumentalist Dudu Borges, known as Analaga, music producer for the series Rensga Hits!. In 2024, she began a romance with the Bahian entrepreneur and Sufi Matheus Seixas.

== Filmography ==
=== Television ===
Year	Title	Role	Notes	Ref.
2010–2011	Malhação	Andréa Ramos	Season 18	
2011–2012	A Vida da Gente	Sofia Azevedo Prates		
2012–2013	Malhação	Lia Martins	Season 20	
2014	Em Família	Young Shirley Soares Esteves	Episodes: "February 4–8, 2014"	
2014–2015	Boogie Oogie	Daniele Veiga Azevedo Fraga		
2015	Malhação	Lia Martins	Season 22; Episode: "May 18, 2015"	
2016	Ligações Perigosas	Cecília Mata Medeiros		
2016–2017	Wounded Past	Isabela Dias/Marina Ramos de Almeida		
2017	Os Trapalhões	Ritoca	Episode: "July 27, 2017"	
2017	Cidade Proibida	Bete Dias	Episode: "Caso Glória"	
2018	Land of the Strong	Maria Ferreira da Silva		
2019	Orphans of a Nation	Dalila Abdallah / Basma Bakri		
2019	Juntos a Magia Acontece	Contractor	End year special	
2020	Mulheres Fantásticas	Narrator	Episode: "Amelia Earhart"	
2022–2025	Rensga Hits!	Raíssa Bárbara Medeiros		
2024	Justiça 2	Carolina Teixeira de Queiroz		
2024	Senna	Lilian de Vasconcellos Souza		
2025	Vale Tudo	Solange Duprat		
2025	Encantado's	Solange Duprat	Episode: "Vale Tudo"	

=== Film ===
Year	Title	Role	Ref.
2016	Tamo Junto	Diana	
2017	O Rastro	Alice	
2024	A Vilã das Nove	Débora	
2025	Rio de Sangue	Luiza Trindade	

=== Videography ===
Year	Song	Artist	Ref.
2013	"Quero te Encontrar"	Anselmo & Rafael	
2015	"Floresta"	Sinara	

=== Internet ===
Year	Title	Role / Function	Notes	Ref.
2021	Gucci Ouverture of Something that Never Ended	Director	Short-film	

== Stage ==
Year	Play	Role
2007	A Guerra de Tróia	
2008	O Inspector Geral	
2008–2009	A Casa da Madrinha	Vera
2009	Tribobó City	
2010	Feitiço da Vila – Noel Rosa	
2012–2014	Conto de Verão	Barbara

== Discography ==
=== Soundtrack ===
Year	Title	Other(s) artist(s)	Album	Music Video
2013	"Amo Assim"	–	Malhação: Intensa como a Vida	Yes
2013	"Sozinha em Minha Companhia"	–	Malhação: Intensa como a Vida	Yes
2022	"De Novo Não"	–	Rensga Hits! Trilha Sonora Original	—N/a
2022	"Coragem"	Alejandro Claveaux	Rensga Hits! Trilha Sonora Original	—N/a
2022	"Desatola Bandida"	—N/a	Rensga Hits! Trilha Sonora Original	Yes
2022	"Pássaro Sem Ninho"	Lorena Comparato	Rensga Hits! Trilha Sonora Original	—N/a
2022	"Nota 100 (Tudo bem… Acontece)"	Lorena Comparato	Rensga Hits! Trilha Sonora Original	—N/a
2024	"Detox de Macho"	Lorena Comparato	Rensga Hits! Segunda Temporada	Yes
2024	"No Sigilo"	Lorena Comparato	Rensga Hits! Segunda Temporada	–
2024	"Raiz"	–	Rensga Hits! Segunda Temporada	–

== Awards and nominations ==
Year	Award	Category	Work	Result	Reference
2012	Prêmio Extra de Televisão	Teen Idol	Malhação	Nominated	
2013	Prêmio Jovem Brasileiro	Best Actress	Malhação	Won	
2016	Prêmio Quem de Televisão	Best Supporting Actress	Ligações Perigosas	Nominated	
2018	Melhores do Ano	Actress in a Series, Miniseries or Series	Onde Nascem os Fortes	Nominated	
2018	Prêmio APCA de Televisão	Best Actress	Onde Nascem os Fortes	Nominated	
2018	Prêmio F5	Best Actress in a Series or Miniseries	Onde Nascem os Fortes	Nominated	
2018	Prêmio Extra de Televisão	Best Actress	Onde Nascem os Fortes	Nominated	
2018	Prêmio The Brazilian Critic	Best Actress in a Drama Series	Onde Nascem os Fortes	Nominated	
2018	Melhores do Ano Natelinha	Best Actress	Onde Nascem os Fortes	Nominated	
2019	Melhores do Ano	Telenovela Actress	Órfãos da Terra	Nominated	
2019	Prêmio Área VIP	Best Actress	Órfãos da Terra	Nominated	
2019	Melhores do Ano Natelinha	Best Actress	Órfãos da Terra	Nominated	
2019	BreakTudo Awards	Best Actress	Órfãos da Terra	Nominated	
2019	Prêmio The Brazilian Critic	Best Telenovela Actress	Órfãos da Terra	Won	
2019	Melhores do Ano Diário Gaúcho	Best Actress	Órfãos da Terra	Nominated	
2019	Melhores do Ano Minha Novela	Best villain	Órfãos da Terra	Nominated	
2022	Prêmio Notícias de TV	Best Young Adult Actress	Rensga Hits!	Nominated	
2022	BreakTudo Awards	National Actress	Rensga Hits!	Nominated	
2022	Melhores do Ano	Series Actress	Rensga Hits!	Nominated	
2022	Prêmio Contigo! Online	Best Series Actress	Rensga Hits!	Nominated	
2022	Melhores do Ano AnaMaria	Actress of The Year	Rensga Hits!	Nominated	
2023	Prêmio iBest	Influencer Protagonist	Rensga Hits!	Nominated	
2023	SEC Awards	Best Actress in a National Series	Rensga Hits!	Nominated	
2024	Prêmio iBest	Influencer Rio de Janeiro	Alice Wegmann	Nominated	
2024	Prêmio iBest	Influencer Protagonist	Justiça 2	Nominated	
2024	Prêmio Noticiasdetv.com	Best Young Adult Actress	Justiça 2	Nominated	
2024	Prêmio F5	Best Actress In a Series or Miniseries	Justiça 2	Nominated	
2025	Platino Awards	Best Series Actress	Rensga Hits!	Pending	
