= Onde Nascem os Fortes =

- Also known as: Land of the Strong
- Genre: Drama; Western; Telenovela
- Created by: George Moura; Sergio Goldenberg
- Directed by: Luisa Lima; Walter Carvalho; Isabella Teixeira; Fabiana Winits
- Creative director: José Luiz Villamarim
- Starring: Patrícia Pillar; Alice Wegmann; Alexandre Nero; Fábio Assunção; Débora Bloch; Gabriel Leone; Irandhir Santos; Enrique Díaz; Carla Salle; Lee Taylor; Maeve Jinkings; Lara Tremouroux; Camila Márdila; José Dumont
- Opening theme: "Todo Homem" by Zeca Veloso, Caetano Veloso & Moreno Veloso
- Country of origin: Brazil
- Original language: Portuguese
- No. of episodes: 53 (30 international version)

Production
- Production locations: São João do Cariri, Paraíba; Boa Vista, Paraíba; Soledade, Paraíba; Gurjão, Paraíba; Cabaceiras, Paraíba; Recife, Pernambuco; Coronel José Dias, Piauí
- Running time: 23–49 minutes
- Production company: Estúdios Globo

Original release
- Network: TV Globo
- Release: 23 April – 16 July 2018

Related
- Os Dias Eram Assim (2017)

Onde Nascem os Fortes (English title: Land of the Strong) is a Brazilian telenovela produced and broadcast by TV Globo, that debuted on 23 April 2018, and ended its run of 53 episodes on 16 July 2018. It is created by George Moura and Sergio Goldenberg. Walter Carvalho, Isabella Teixeira, José Luiz Villamarim, Fabiana Winits and Luisa Lima serve as the main directors. It is the second series announced and displayed as "superseries" — a dramatic plot similar to that of telenovelas, but with a standard and mature format. The format was first employed with the launch of Os Dias Eram Assim.

After the disappearance of Nonato (Marco Pigossi), after a fight with the powerful Pedro Gouveia, played by Alexandre Nero. The twin sister of Nonato, Maria, played by Alice Wegmann, begins the search for her brother.

== Premise ==
Twins Maria and Nonato decide to make a bike trail in the village where their mother, Cássia, lived in her youth and decided not to return. One night, Nonato tries to seduce Joana, a lover of the businessman Pedro Gouveia, who jealously takes him to the thickets to teach him a lesson. Nonato disappears mysteriously without a trail. Maria has been involved with Pedro's son, Hermano, for quite some time. With the help of Ramiro, who has a strong rivalry with Pedro, Cássia returns to Sertão in search of her missing son and daughter. Maria now a fugitive, after killing a man who tried to sexually assault her.

== Cast ==
- Alice Wegmann as Maria Ferreira da Silva
- Gabriel Leone as Hermano Gouveia
- Patrícia Pillar as Cássia Ferreira da Silva
- Alexandre Nero as Pedro Gouveia
- Fábio Assunção as Ramiro Curió
- Débora Bloch as Rosinete Gouveia
- Irandhir Santos as Samir
- Enrique Díaz as Plínio
- Lee Taylor as Simplício
- Carla Salle as Valquíria
- Maeve Jinkings as Joana
- Lara Tremouroux as Aurora Gouvea
- Camila Márdila as Aldina
- José Dumont as Sebastião (Tião das Cacimbas)
- Demick Lopes as Mudinho
- Antônio Fábio as Orlando
- Ênio Cavalcante as Toinho
- Erivaldo Oliveira as Adenilson
- Ravel Andrade as Clécio
- Clarissa Pinheiro as Gilvânia
- Marcos de Andrade as Agripino Gogó
- Rodrigo García as Jurandir
- Bruno Goya as Orestes
- Nanego Lira as Adauto
- Giordano Castro as Macedo
- Igor Medeiros as Fabrício
- Maycon Douglas as Ariel
- Mário Cabral as Jonathan
- Pedro Fasanaro as Valdir
- Pedro Wagner as Damião
- Quitéria Kelly as Umbelina
- Raquel Ferreira as Ivonete
- Arilson Lopes as Clementino
- Fernanda Marques as Selma
- Ilya São Paulo as Vitório

=== Guest cast ===
- Marco Pigossi as Nonato Ferreira da Silva
- Jesuíta Barbosa as Ramirinho Curió Jr / Shakira do Sertão
- Titina Medeiros as Bethânia
- Mariana Molina as Madalena
