= Pigossi =

Pigossi is a Italian surname. Notable people with the surname include:

- Laura Pigossi (born 1994), Brazilian professional tennis player
- Marco Pigossi (born 1989), Brazilian actor and producer
