= Telenovela (disambiguation) =

Telenovela is a Latin American television genre.

Telenovela may also refer to:

- Telenovela (TV channel), a South Korean television channel
- Telenovela Channel, a Philippine television channel
- Telenovela (TV series), an American television series

== See also ==
- Téléroman, a French-Canadian television genre
