= Sangue Bom =

- Genre: Telenovela; Romantic comedy
- Created by: Maria Adelaide Amaral; Vincent Villari
- Directed by: Dennis Carvalho
- Starring: Sophie Charlotte; Marco Pigossi; Fernanda Vasconcellos; Jayme Matarazzo; Isabelle Drummond; Humberto Carrão; Ingrid Guimarães; Giulia Gam; Herson Capri; Letícia Sabatella; Marco Ricca; Bruno Garcia; Regiane Alves; Felipe Camargo; Marisa Orth; Malu Mader
- Opening theme: "Toda Forma de Amor" by Sambô "Suerte" by Paty Cantú (International version)
- Country of origin: Brazil
- Original language: Portuguese
- No. of episodes: 160 (Original run); 120 (Syndication)

Production
- Production locations: São Paulo, Brazil
- Camera setup: Multi-camera
- Running time: 36—47 minutes
- Production company: Central Globo de Produção

Original release
- Network: Rede Globo
- Release: 29 April – 1 November 2013

Sangue Bom (International title: Tangled Hearts) is a Brazilian access prime telenovela created and written by Maria Adelaide Amaral with Vincent Villari and, directed by Dennis Carvalho.

The series premiered on 29 April 2013 and ended on 1 November 2013 on TV Globo at 7:30 p.m. / 8:15 p.m. (BRT/AMT).

A total of 161 episodes of 45 minutes were originally planned to be produced, however, due to Globo's live coverage of the 2013 protests, Sangue Bom was not aired on 20 June and got the number of episodes reduced to 160.

Sophie Charlotte, Marco Pigossi, Fernanda Vasconcellos, Jayme Matarazzo, Isabelle Drummond and Humberto Carrão star as the protagonists, while Ingrid Guimarães stars as the main antagonist.

== Plot ==
Tangled Hearts follows the story of six young individuals who work hard to achieve their dreams and also dream of loving someone special and being loved as well. Amora, Bento and Fabio were raised at an orphanage at Capo Verde by Gilson and his wife, Selma. They each took their own path in life when Amora was adopted by actress Barbara Ellen, Fabio with a broke family in the countryside and Bento grew up to become a florist in a cooperative with Gilson, Selma and Giane, a childhood friend Who secretly has a crush on him.

Amora becomes a famous model and media personality and socialite Who is brattish and vain, and Malú, her adoptive sister is a responsible, simple and down to earth University student who is unloved by Barbara Ellen who considers her a mistake.

== Cast ==
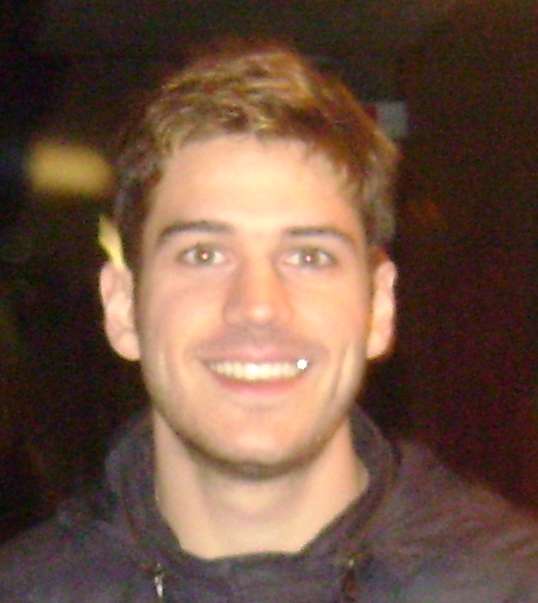
Marco Pigossi as Bento.

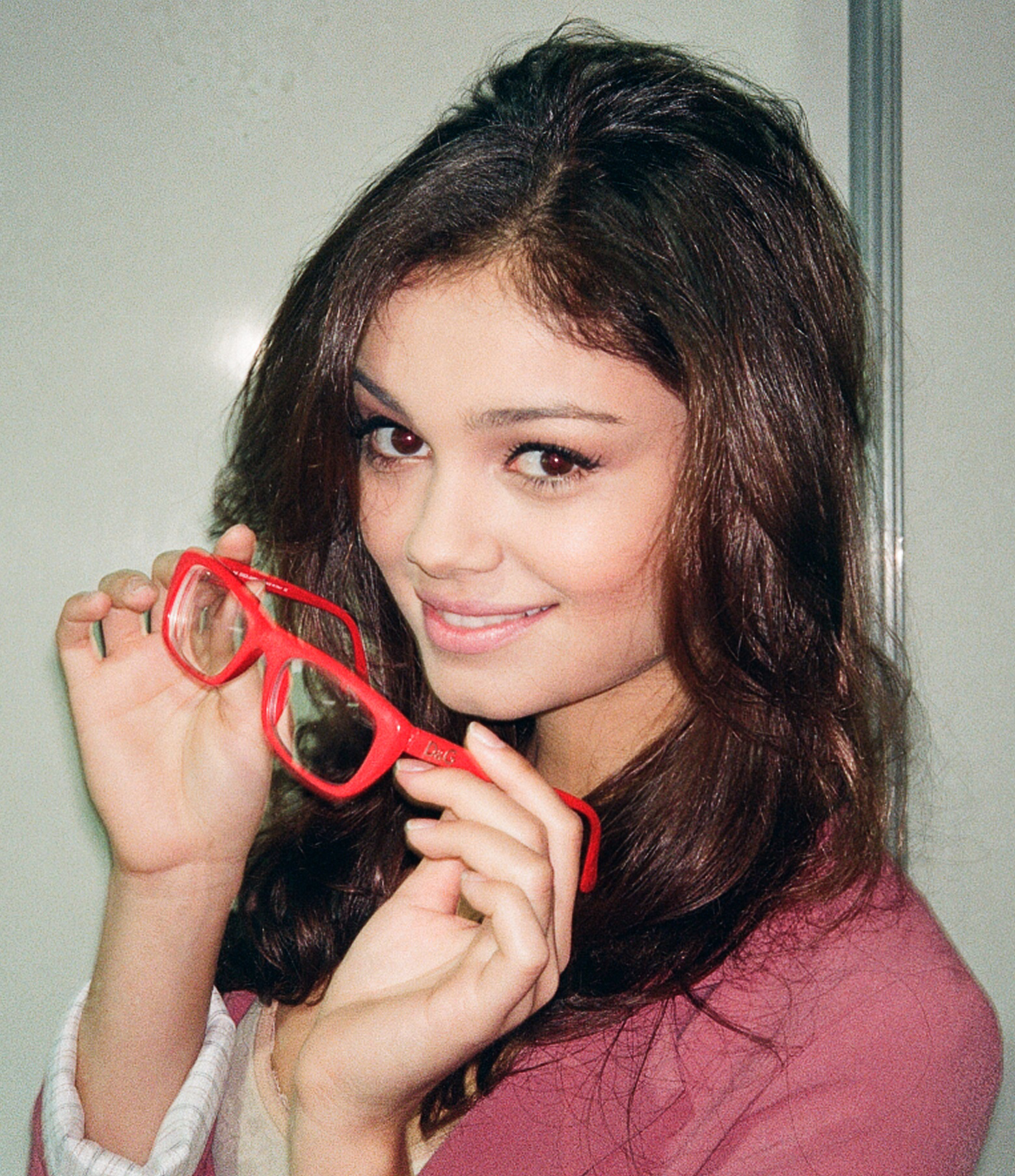
Sophie Charlotte as Amora.

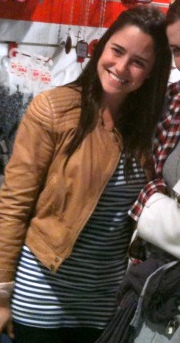
Fernanda Vasconcellos as Malu.

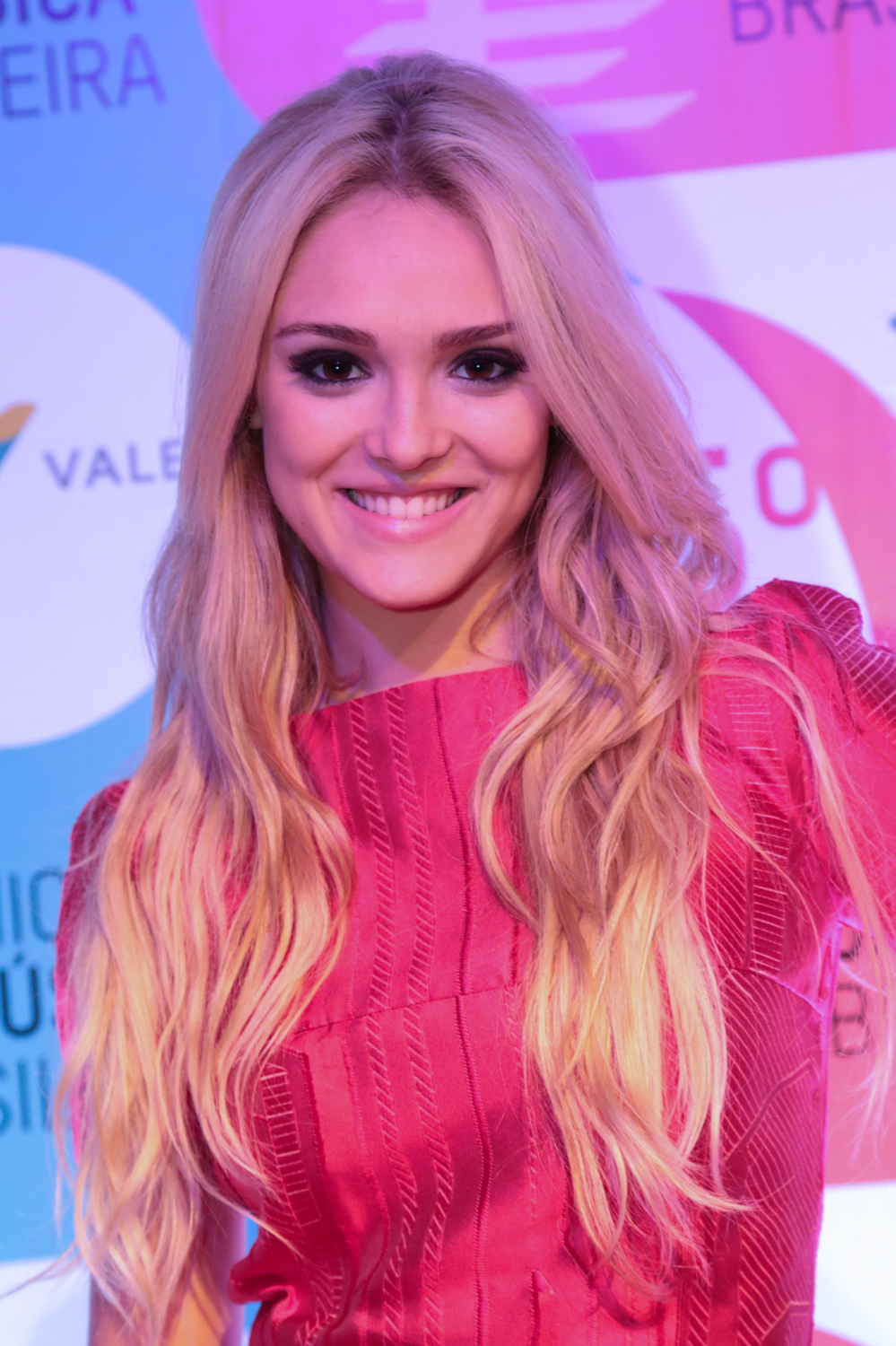
Isabelle Drummond as Giane.

Actor	Character
Marco Pigossi	Bento de Jesus / Kim Rabelo
Sophie Charlotte	Amora Campana / Mayara Capilatti
Fernanda Vasconcellos	Maria Luísa Campana (Malu)
Jayme Matarazzo	Maurício Vasquez
Isabelle Drummond	Giane de Souza
Humberto Carrão	Fábio Queiroz Campana (Fabinho)
Ingrid Guimarães	Albertina Leão (Tina)
Giulia Gam	Bárbara Ellen / Conceição da Silva
Herson Capri	Plínio Campana
Letícia Sabatella	Verônica Vasquez / Palmira Valente
Marisa Orth	Damáris Carmim / Gládis do Cabo Sul
Marco Ricca	Wilson Rabello
Armando Babaioff	Érico Rabello
Regiane Alves	Renata Moretti
Malu Mader	Rosemere Moreira
Felipe Camargo	Perácio Fernão Pais
Yoná Magalhães	Glória Pais
Louise Cardoso	Salma Rabello
Daniel Dantas	Gilson Rabello
Deborah Evelyn	Irene Fiori / Rita de Cássia
Leticia Isnard	Brenda Mendonça Pais
Tatiana Alvim	Sabrina do Socorro
Mayana Neiva	Charlene de Carvalho
Joaquim Lopes	Lucindo Lago
Maria Helena Chira	Lara Keller
Rômulo Neto	Tito Carmim Rabello
Bruno Garcia	Natan Vasquez
Carla Sall	Melissa Carmim Rabello (Mel)
Ellen Rocche	Brunnety Maciel Vieira "Macieira" / Mulher Mangaba
Maurício Destri	Vinícius Carmim Rabello (Vinny)
Thiago Amaral	Caio Ferreti
Fafy Siqueira	Maria das Dores da Silva (Madá)
Aline Dias	Luz Maria da Silva
Marcus Rigonatti	Kevin da Silva
Ayumi Irie	Dorothy da Silva
Rodrigo López	Vitinho Barata
Samya Pascotto	Tábata Mendonça Pais
Josafá Filho	Filipe Moreira Pais (Filipinho) / Famosinho da Casa Verde
Felipe Lima	Alexandre Mendonça Pais (Xande)
Thaila Ayala	Camila Lancaster (Camilinha)
Bia Arantes	Cléo
Bruna Hamú	Karolina
Caroline Figueiredo	Júlia Oliver
Sérgio Malheiros	Jonas Siqueira
Keruse Bongiolo	Mônica
Sylbeth Soriano	Sandra Passalaqua (Sandrona)
Norival Rizzo	Silvério de Souza
Tuna Dwek	Suely Pedrosa
Mila Moreira	Sylvia Laport
Edwin Luisi	Ulysses Lago (Tio Lili)
Noemi Marinho	Margot Queiroz
Wandi Doratiotto	Nestor Moretti
Cris Nicolotti	Odíla Moreira Moretti
Izabella Bicalho	Nice Flora
Miguel Arraes	Pedrinho
Carmem Verônica	Carmem Lúcia Lancaster (Karmita)
Dorival Carper	Eliseu
Mônica Torres	Áurea Moreira
Eliana Pittman	Francisca Fiapo (Chica)
Pedro Inoue	Douglas de Carvalho
Mariah da Penha	Emília dos Reis
Thais Garayp	Santa
Priscila Camargo	Nancimara Rocha (Nancy)
Yaçanã Martins	Célia Mendes (Celinha)
Rafael Paoli	Eduardo
Nanda Lisboa	Sheila Salez
Júlio Oliveira	Patrick Mateus (Peixinho)
Luiz André Alvim	Mulher Pau-de-Jacu
Vânia Love	Mulher Saputá
Dani Vieira	Mulher Pupunha
Fernanda Abraão	Mulher Jambolão
Rubens Camello	Cristóvam Bolívar
Antônio Firmino	Evandro
Guilherme Gonzalez	Zito Biense
Thais Lago da Silva	Marisa Rosa (Mari)

=== Special participation ===
Actor	Character
Andreia Horta	Simone
Xuxa Lopes	Bluma Lancaster
Tarcísio Filho	Nelson
Tato Gabus Mendes	Franklin Cardoso
Helena Fernandes	Lana Ferreto
Alejandro Claveaux	Manolo
Bernardo Simões	Young Fabinho
Luan Pickler	Young Bento
Marcella Ramalho	Young Amora
Marcella Ramalho	Mayara
Luisa Thiré	Dr. Isaura
César Mello	Arthur Bicalho
André Guerreiro Lopes	Barrabás
Tiago Martelli	Sininho
Jackson Antunes	Pascoal Gambini
Ítalo Villani	Cauã Jungle
Ângela Rabello	Dona Gilda
Lucas Nadin	Afonso
Pablo Morais	Jonathan de Alencar Castro (James)
Marlos Cruz	Carlito (Carlos)
Lu Camy	Vívian
Letícia Cannavale	Lívia
Ana Paula Pedro	Caetana
Rosanna Viegas	Pulquéria
Tertulina Lima	Gertrudes
Christiano Torreão	Eustáquio
Carlos Alexandre Saddy	André
Felipe Haiut	Garoto
Lucas Cordeiro	Garoto
Camilo Bevilacqua	Locatário
Sávio Moll	Tavares
Edvard Vasconcellos	Delegado de polícia
Ana Cláudia Fanchini	Vanessa

== Impact ==
=== Ratings ===
Timeslot	Episodes	Premiere		Finale		Rank	Season	Rating average
Timeslot	Episodes	Date	Viewers (in points)	Date	Viewers (in points)	Rank	Season	Rating average
Mondays—Saturdays; 7:30pm	160	April 29, 2013	28	November 1, 2013	28	#1	2013–14	25

== Broadcast ==
Country	TV network	Local title	Series premiere	Series finale	Weekly schedule	Timeslot	Ref
(Brazil)	TV Globo	Sangue Bom	April 29, 2013	November 1, 2013	Monday to Saturday	19:30^{1}	—N/a
(São Tomé and Príncipe)	TVS	Sangue Bom	May 6, 2013	November 8, 2013	Monday to Saturday	19:00	—N/a
(Portugal)	SIC	Sangue Bom	September 9, 2013	May 2, 2014	Monday to Friday	18:30	—N/a
(South Korea)	TeleNovela	프랜즈	July 29, 2014	unknown	Tuesday	20:30^{2}	—N/a
(Mongolia)	EduTV	Tangled Hearts	To be launched				
(Indonesia)	Kompas TV	Tangled Hearts	To be launched				
(Uruguay)	Teledoce	Laberintos del Corazón	To be launched				
(United States)	MundoFox	Laberintos del Corazón	To be launched				—N/a

^1 Series broadcast at 20:15 (UTC−4) on states part of the Amazon time zone (from April 29, 2013 to October 19, 2013) and at 20:15 (UTC−3) or 19:15 (UTC−4) on states where Dailying saving time is not used (from October 21, 2013 to November 1, 2013).

^2 Series broadcast weekly double-length episodes.
