= You're Dating a Narcissist! =

2025 American movie

- Theatrical release poster
- Directed by: Ann Marie Allison
- Screenplay by: Ann Marie Allison; Jenna Milly
- Produced by: Ann Marie Allison; Jorge Garcia Castro; Eric B. Fleischman; Chris Abernathy
- Starring: Marisa Tomei; Sherry Cola; Ciara Bravo; Marco Pigossi; José María Yazpik; Jonah Platt
- Cinematography: Martim Vian
- Edited by: Josie Azzam; Kristine McPherson
- Music by: Maxton Waller
- Production companies: Altered L.A. Cool Girl Productions; The Wonder Company
- Distributed by: Brainstorm Media
- Release dates: October 25, 2025 (Austin Film Festival); March 27, 2026 (United States)
- Running time: 91 minutes
- Country: United States
- Language: English

You're Dating a Narcissist! is a 2025 American comedy film directed by Ann Marie Allison, written by Allison and Jenna Milly and starring Marisa Tomei. It is Allison's feature directorial debut.

== Plot ==
New York City psychology professor Judy Kaplan wrote a book on narcissists and created a class to teach her students how to spot them before losing their psyche. She counsels colleague Diane in a bad breakup to delete her ex. When her 22-year-old daughter Eva, studying art in Los Angeles, gets engaged to Theo after dating for only six weeks, Judy sees typical "narc" behavior, including fast-forwarding and love bombing.

Judy and Diane fly to California for an intervention before the relationship can reach the destructive Devalue and Discard phases. During a visit with Theo's wealthy family Judy confronts Eva with her theories but is dismissed. She confesses to Diane that she met narcissist Edward at 22 and ended up pregnant with Eva and unable to experience the life she wanted.

While spying on doctor Theo at work, Diane starts contradicting Judy's theories. They follow him and a young woman to a house and take incriminating pictures. To Judy's surprise, Eva trusts Theo with his female friend.

Nevertheless, Eva confronts him about seeing his ex-fiancé Simone, spies on him the following evening, and ends the relationship. The two older women celebrate their success. Eva asks to return with her mother to continue her studies in New York.

Judy apologizes to hotel owner Daniel for going all-Judy on him, then leaves to meet Eva. Meanwhile, Theo takes her to see the house he bought for them with Simone acting as his real estate agent. They move up their wedding date.

A distraught Judy meets Daniel for drinks only to end up in a fight with Edward, who showed up at the hotel with a date to attend the wedding. Diane's ex Lauren also shows up and begs forgiveness, but brought her wife on the trip. Eva gets cold feet, fearing Theo playing her against Simone in what Judy calls Triangulation.

Unable to deal with her failure, Judy decides to go home before the wedding. Diane shows her proof that Theo has two phones, a typical narc move. They scheme to take the private device to look for incriminating evidence.

Judy meets Theo in the hotel lobby. By the time he takes off his jacket, giving Diane a chance to steal the phone out of its pocket, all three are so drunk that the plan goes awry. Judy and Theo fight over the jacket. When Eva walks in, she reveals that the second phone is for his work as a doctor and disinvites her mother from the wedding.

After Diane tells Judy to let her daughter live her life and make mistakes, Daniel consoles a crying Judy and they end up making love. He convinces her to attend the wedding so Eva doesn't regret it for the rest of her life.

Theo receives a work call in the honeymoon suite and leaves. Called by a bridesmaid, Eva's ex shows up in the hotel lobby. After calling it quits with him, she overhears Theo and nurse May making a scene because Theo called her his soulmate.

Mother and daughter make up on the beach. Diane blocks Lauren for good. In a mid-credits scene Diane counsels a colleague after a breakup and starts a relationship with her.

== Cast ==
- Marisa Tomei as Judy Kaplan
- Sherry Cola as Diane
- Ciara Bravo as Eva
- Marco Pigossi as Theo
- José María Yazpik as Daniel

== Production ==
In December 2023, it was announced that Tomei, Cola, Bravo, Pigossi and Yazpik were cast in the film.

== Release ==
The film premiered at the Austin Film Festival on October 25, 2025.

Brainstorm Media took the rights for the film and released it domestically on March 27th, 2026 across theaters nationwide.

== Reception ==
On review aggregator Rotten Tomatoes, 52% of 21 critics gave the film a positive review, with an average rating of 4.2/10.

Kimberley Jones of The Austin Chronicle, who reviewed the film wrote, "First-time director Ann Marie Allison (who co-wrote the script with Jenna Milly) has cited personal experience with dating a narcissist as inspiration for the film, and there's an undercurrent of righteous anger animating the film that feels honest and hard-earned."

"Tomei is undeniable – also great inspiration if you're building out a Chic Academic Pinterest board – and she and Bravo forge an chemistry as mother and daughter. That bond, and the boutique hotel where much of the film takes place, are the draws here."
