= Boogie Oogie =

Brazilian telenovela

- Genre: Telenovela
- Created by: Rui Vilhena
- Directed by: Ricardo Waddington; Gustavo Fernandez
- Starring: Ísis Valverde; Bianca Bin; Marco Pigossi; Giulia Gam; Marco Ricca; Alessandra Negrini; Deborah Secco; Betty Faria; Francisco Cuoco; Letícia Spiller; Heloísa Périssé; Daniel Dantas; Alice Wegmann
- Opening theme: "That's the Way (I Like It)" by KC and the Sunshine Band
- Ending theme: "That's the Way (I Like It)" by KC and the Sunshine Band
- Country of origin: Brazil
- Original language: Portuguese
- No. of episodes: 185

Original release
- Network: TV Globo
- Release: 4 August 2014 – 6 March 2015

Boogie Oogie is a Brazilian telenovela produced and broadcast by TV Globo. It premiered on 4 August 2014, replacing Meu Pedacinho de Chão and ended on 6 March 2015, replaced by Sete Vidas.

It was created by Rui Vilhena and starred Ísis Valverde, Bianca Bin, Marco Pigossi, Deborah Secco, Heloísa Périssé, Fabiula Nascimento, José Loreto, Betty Faria, Francisco Cuoco, Guilherme Fontes, Daniel Dantas, Alice Wegmann, Sandra Corveloni, Rita Elmôr, Bruno Garcia, Alexandra Richter, Fabrício Boliveira, Letícia Spiller, Marco Ricca, Giulia Gam and Alessandra Negrini.

== Synopsis ==
The story begins in 1956. Fernando's lover, Susana, dreams of the day when he will separate from his wife Carlota to stay with her. This plan, however, goes awry; Fernando discovers that his wife is pregnant and decides to leave Susana. Bitter and desperate, Susana can only think of revenge. The day that Carlota gives birth, she hires a nurse to switch the daughter of the couple for another girl, just for the pleasure of knowing that they are going to spend life away from the true heiress. Sandra, Fernando and Carlota's real daughter, is raised by repressed housewife Beatriz and military man Elísio; while Fernando and Carlota raise Vitória, Beatriz and Elísio's biological daughter.

More than 20 years later, in 1978, on Sandra and Alex's wedding day, a tragedy occurs that changes her life forever: the girl's groom tragically dies. On the way to the church, there is a plane crash and Alex saves the pilot but is trapped and an explosion kills him. The pilot he saved is Rafael, Vitória's boyfriend. Sandra blames Rafael for the death of her loved one.

Despite her efforts to hate him, she falls in love with him and then they live a nice love story. But this love will not be easy. As if the dispute for the same man were not enough, Sandra and Victoria discover that they were exchanged in the maternity ward. Thereafter, the rivalry between the two only increases.

Another figure that promises to be a stone in the shoe of the protagonist is Pedro. Obsessed with Sandra, the soldier has never accepted the fact that she chose to stay with Alex, his brother, in the past. With the death of his rival, he believes he has a chance to win her back. And for that, he will do whatever is necessary. Upon learning that the girl has a new love, the officer will use all his tricks to separate her from Rafael.

== Cast ==
Actor/Actress	Character
Ísis Valverde	Sandra Miranda Romão / Sandra Veiga e Azevedo Fraga
Bianca Bin	Vitória Veiga e Azevedo Fraga / Vitória Miranda Romão
Marco Pigossi	Rafael Castro Silva "Rafa"
Giulia Gam	Carlota Veiga e Azevedo Fraga
Marco Ricca	Fernando Veiga e Azevedo Fraga
Alessandra Negrini	Susana Bueno / "Isabela" / "Ana" / "Graciosa"
Deborah Secco	Inês Teixeira Navarrete Santos
Fabrício Boliveira	Tadeu Santos
Heloísa Périssé	Beatriz Miranda Romão
Daniel Dantas	Lieutenant colonel Elísio Romão
Caco Ciocler	Paulo Fonseca
Letícia Spiller	Gilda Barcelos Antunes
Guilherme Fontes	Mário Silva
Fabíula Nascimento	Cristina Cris
Pepita Rodrigues	Ágata "Corvo"
Betty Faria	Madalena Veiga
Francisco Cuoco	Vicente Santos
Rodrigo Simas	Roberto Veiga
Alice Wegmann	Daniele Veiga
Bruno Garcia	Ricardo Veiga
Alexandra Richter	Luisa Veiga
José Loreto	Pedro Oliveira
Thaís de Campos	Célia Batista Lobato
Rita Elmôr	Leonor Mascarenhas D'Andrea
Maria João Bastos	Diana
Zezé Motta	Sebastiana Santos
Gustavo Trestini	Artur Batista Lobato
Julia Dalavia	Alessandra Batista Lobato
Brenno Leone	Rodrigo Barcelos Antunes
Giovanna Rispoli	Claudia Miranda Romão
Caio Manhente	Filipe Veiga e Azevedo Fraga
José Victor Pires	Otávio Miranda Romão
João Vithor Oliveira	Sergio Castro Silva "Serginho"
Aline Xavier	Ivete de Souza
Cacá Amaral	Gilson Lima Toledo
Ana Rosa	Zuleica Lima Toledo
Sandra Corveloni	Augusta Oliveira
Priscila Fantin	Solange
Junno Andrade	Amaury Parede de Carvalho
Osvaldo Mil	Homero Parede de Carvalho
Mario Hermeto	Wilson
Élcio Romar	Gustavo Mendes
Nicola Lama	Giovanni Bastos
Eduardo Gaspar	Adriano Martins
Marizabel Pacheco	Leda Machado
Thati Lopes	Jussara
Marcio Rosário	Jeferson Fernandes
Lionel Fischer	Curi Andrade
Giselle Batista	Glória
Julia Oristanio	Priscila Barreto
Dja Marthins	Geralda Neves
Renata Ricci	Vivian
Luís Navarro	Cleiton
Lyv Ziese	Magali
Pedro Pauleey	Sauro
Eunice Braulio	Stela
Eliana Mey	Su Yumi
Wendell Bendelack	Boogie Oogie
Eddy Guaratiba	Eduardo
Fernando Belo	Alex Oliveira
Christiana Guinle	Márcia Campos
Laura Cardoso	Lúcia Silva
Claudia Assunção	Júlia Vilar
Joana Fomm	Odete Dias
Luís Carlos Miele	Carlos
Leiloca	Silvia "Silvinha"
Neusa Borges	Cartomante
