= Marco Pigossi =

Brazilian actor and producer (born 1989)

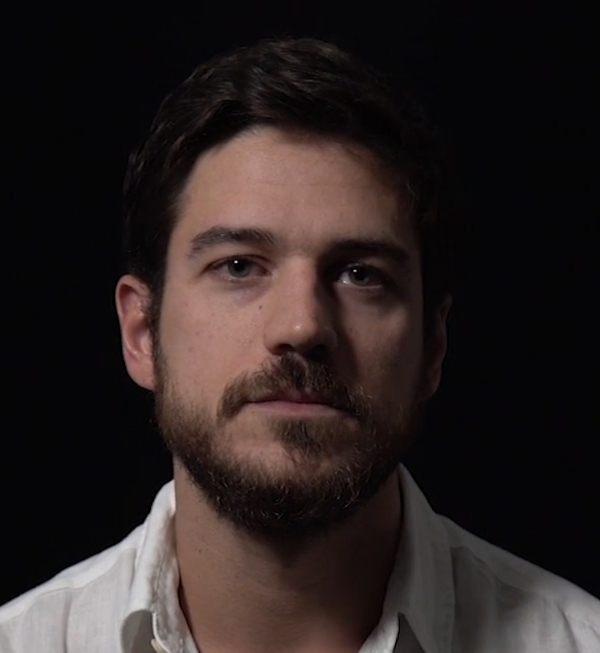
- Pigossi in 2018
- Born: Marco Fábio Maldonado Pigossi; 1 February 1989 (age 37); São Paulo, Brazil
- Education: Anhembi Morumbi University
- Occupations: Actor; producer
- Years active: 2004–present
- Spouse: Marco Calvani (m. 2023)

Marco Fábio Maldonado Pigossi (Portuguese: [ˈmaʁku piˈɡɔsi]; born 1 February 1989) is a Brazilian actor and producer. He is known for playing Dylan on the Australian television series Tidelands, and for playing Eric in the Brazilian series Invisible City.

== Early life ==
Pigossi was born in São Paulo, the son of Mariness Maldonado and Oswaldo Pigossi. He graduated in social communication with a degree in Radio and TV from Anhembi Morumbi University.

== Career ==
Pigossi started in the theater at the age of 13, when he decided to take a class out of curiosity and was charmed, at 17 he graduated. He became a professional swimmer, being runner-up of the state of São Paulo in 2005, by the club Athlético Paulistano. In 2003, he was selected by SBT to act in the Brazilian version of Rebelde Way as Paulo Roberto, he would be part of the band and had already recorded songs and three chapters. However, the version was frowned upon by Cris Morena Group.

In 2004, he transferred to Rede Globo, and was part of the cast of the miniseries Um Só Coração, where he played the revolutionary student Dráusio Marcondes de Souza. In 2007, he participated in Eterna Magia, playing Miguel Finnegan, shortly after, still in 2007, he made the teen Bruno in the miniseries Queridos Amigos.

In 2009, he made his most successful character, in the telenovela Caras & Bocas, playing the homosexual character Cássio. In 2010, he made a playboy in the remake Ti Ti Ti, where he played Pedro Luís, eldest son of the protagonist Jacques Léclair (Alexandre Borges). In 2011, he was part of the cast of Fina Estampa in the role of Rafael.

In 2012, he joined the cast of the telenovela Gabriela playing Juvenal Leal. In 2013 he played Bento, the protagonist of Sangue Bom, making a romantic couple with Amora Campana (Sophie Charlotte) and Malu Campana (Fernanda Vasconcellos).

In 2014, Pigossi was quoted to play a role in Now Generation, however due to changes in the cast, he was replaced by Fiuk, and moved to the remake O Rebu; but had to leave the cast of this telenovela, to replace Caio Castro, in the role of Raphael, protagonist of Boogie Oogie. Still in 2014, he was cast to A Regra do Jogo, portraying the police officer Dante.

In 2017, he played the passionate trucker José Ribamar do Carmo (Zeca), in A Força do Querer, one of the eight protagonists of the novel, making romantic pair with the seductive Ritinha (Isis Valverde) and the police woman Jeiza (Paolla Oliveira).

In 2018, he decided not to renew with Rede Globo, and amends two series of Netflix: Tidelands, supernatural police drama and the first Australian original series and Invisible City that will portray an underworld inhabited by mythical creatures that evolved from a lineage of Brazilian folklore. In 2023, he joined the cast of the Prime Video series Gen V, playing the character Dr. Edison Cardosa.

== Personal life ==
Since 2018, Pigossi lives in Los Angeles.

In November 2021, Pigossi came out as gay and made public his relationship with Italian director Marco Calvani.

== Filmography ==
=== Television ===
| Year | Title | Role | Notes |
|---|---|---|---|
| 2004 | Um Só Coração | Dráusio Marcondes de Souza | |
| 2007 | Eterna Magia | Miguel Finnegan | |
| 2008 | Queridos Amigos | Bruno | |
| 2009−2010 | Caras & Bocas | Cássio Amaral | Main role |
| 2010 | Ti Ti Ti | Pedro Luis Spina | |
| 2011−2012 | Fina Estampa | Rafael Fernandes | |
| 2012 | Gabriela | Juvenal Leal | |
| 2013 | Sangue Bom | Bento de Jesus | Main role |
| 2014−2015 | Boogie Oogie | Rafael Castro e Silva | Main role |
| 2015−2016 | A Regra do Jogo | Dante Stewart dos Santos | Main role |
| 2017 | A Força do Querer | José Ribamar do Carmo (Zeca) | Main role |
| 2018 | Onde Nascem os Fortes | Nonato Ferreira da Silva | |
| 2018 | Tidelands | Dylan Seager | Main role |
| 2020 | High Seas | Fábio | Main role (season 3) |
| 2021−2023 | Invisible City | Eric Alves | Main role |
| 2023 | Gen V | Dr. Edison Cardosa | Recurring role (season 1) |
| 2024 | Astronauta | Astronauta/Pereira | Voice, main role |
| 2026 | Brilliant Minds | Dr. Beau Pedrosa | Recurring role (season 2) |

=== Film ===
| Year | Title | Role |
|---|---|---|
| 2005 | O Diário Aberto de R. | Rafael (short film) |
| 2009 | Universos Paralelos | Theo (short film) |
| 2017 | A Última Chance | Fábio Leão |
| 2018 | O Nome da Morte | Júlio Santana |
| 2024 | High Tide | Lourenço and executive producer |
| 2024 | The Park Maniac | Vicente |
| 2024 | Bone Lake | Diego |
| 2026 | You're Dating a Narcissist! | Theo |

== Theater ==
| Year | Title | Role |
|---|---|---|
| 2006 | Spring Awakening | Melchior Gabor |
| 2006 | Os Dois Cavalheiros de Verona | |
| 2010 | Paixão de Cristo | Pôncio Pilatos |
| 2011 | O Santo e A Porca | Dodô |
| 2011 | As Eruditas | Cristóvão |
| 2012 | O Olho Azul da Falecida | Hal |
| 2012 | Auto da Compadecida | Chicó |
| 2014 | Sweet Bird of Youth | |
| 2015 | O Sucesso a Qualquer Preço | Rick Roma |

== Awards and nominations ==
| Year | Award | Category | Work | Results | Reference |
|---|---|---|---|---|---|
| 2010 | Prêmio Extra de Televisão | Best Revelation | Caras & Bocas | Won | |
| 2010 | Melhores do Ano | Best Revelation Actor | Caras & Bocas | Nominated | |
| 2010 | Prêmio Contigo! de TV | Best Revelation Actor | Caras & Bocas | Nominated | |
| 2012 | Prêmio Contigo! de TV | Best Supporting Actor | Fina Estampa | Nominated | |
| 2012 | Prêmio Quem de Televisão | Best Supporting Actor | Gabriela | Nominated | |
| 2013 | Meus Prêmios Nick | Favorite Actor | Sangue Bom | Nominated | |
| 2013 | Prêmio Extra de Televisão | Best Actor | Sangue Bom | Nominated | |
| 2013 | Capricho Awards | Best Nacional Actor | Sangue Bom | Nominated | |
| 2013 | Prêmio Quem de Televisão | Best Actor | Sangue Bom | Nominated | |
| 2016 | Prêmio Aplauso Brasil de Teatro | Best Actor | O Sucesso a Qualquer Preço | Nominated | |
| 2017 | Melhores do Ano | Best Telenovela Actor | A Força do Querer | Won | |
| 2017 | Prêmio F5 | Best Telenovela Actor | A Força do Querer | Won | |
| 2017 | Prêmio Contigo! Online | Best Telenovela Actor | A Força do Querer | Won | |
| 2018 | Troféu Internet | Best Actor | A Força do Querer | Nominated | |
| 2018 | Troféu Imprensa | Best Actor | A Força do Querer | Won | |
