= Fabiana Karla =

Brazilian actress and comedian

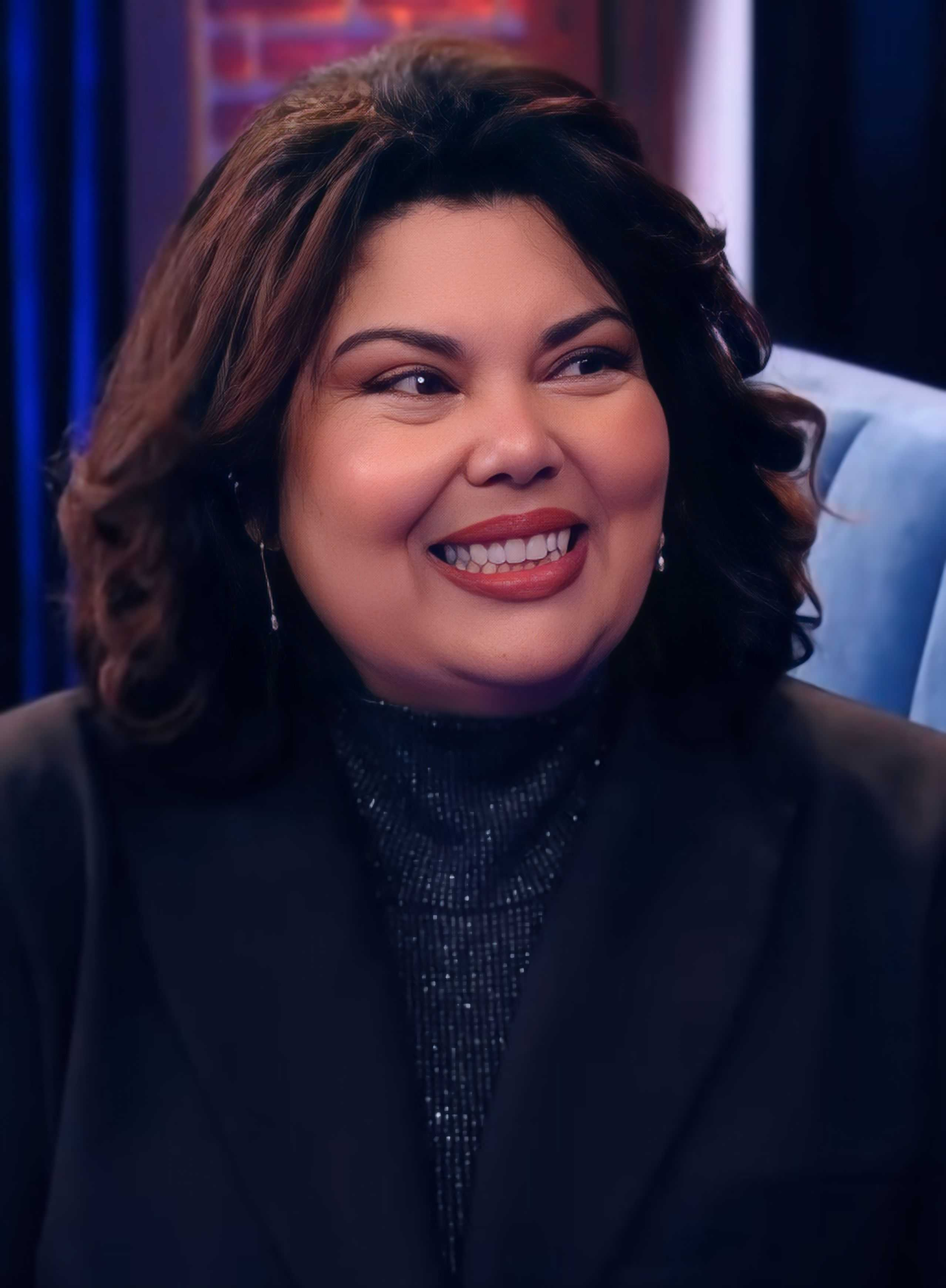
- Karla in 2024
- Born: Fabiana Karla Souza Simões Barbosa; 30 October 1975 (age 50); Recife, Pernambuco, Brazil
- Occupation: Actress
- Years active: 1990–present
- Spouses: Samuel Petroti (div. 2009) Bruno Muniz (m. 2010; div. 2017) Diogo Mello (m. 2019)
- Children: 3

Fabiana Karla Souza Simões Barbosa (born 30 October 1975) is a Brazilian actress, writer, television presenter and comedian, best known for her work on the Globo sketch comedy series Zorra Total and Escolinha do Professor Raimundo.

== Filmography ==
Television
Year	Title	Role	Notes
2003	Mulheres Apaixonadas	Celia	
2004–2015	Zorra Total	Lucicreide / Gislaine/ Doctor Lorca / Fabi Amaranto / Búnia	
2005	Dança dos Famosos	Contestant	Season 1, 5th place
2007	A Grande Família	Doralice	Episode: "O Pai de Júlio"
2012	Gabriela	Olga Bastos	
2013–2014	Amor à Vida	Perséfone Fortino	
2014	As Canalhas	Carolina	Episode: "Danielle"
2015	Tomara que Caia	Various	
2015–2017	Zorra	Various	
2015–2021	Escolinha do Professor Raimundo	Dona Cacilda	
2017	Mister Brau	Priscila	Episode: "12"
2017	Popstar	Contestant	Season 1, 7th place
2018–2019	Malhação: Vidas Brasileiras	Penha da Paz	Season 26
2018–2020	Dra. Darci	Cíntia	
2019	Verão 90	Madalena "Madá" Sampaio / Freda Mercúrio	
2019–2020	Se Joga	Presenter	
2020	Arraiá em Casa	Presenter	
2021	Falas Femininas	Presenter	
2022–2024	Rensga Hits!	Helena Maravilha/Francinéia de Souza	
2022–2023	Central de Bicos	Meg Maçaneta	
2023	Queens on the Run	Guest Judge	Episode: "Abalando em Fortaleza"
2023	LOL: Se Rir, Já Era!	Presenter	
2024	Bake Off Brasil	Presenter	
2024	5x Comédia	Cândida dos Santos	Episode: "A Batalha das Sobrancelhas"
2026	A Nobreza do Amor	Maria das Graças Bonafé "Graça"	

Film
Year	Title	Role
2006	Trair e Coçar É Só Começar	Zefinha
2006	A Máquina	Nazaré
2006	Xuxa Gêmeas	Nurse (cameo)
2011	O Palhaço	Tonha
2012	Meus Dois Amores	Tomázia
2013	Casa da Mãe Joana 2	Maria Antonieta
2015	Loucas Pra Casar	Dolores
2016	Tô Ryca	Marilene
