= Senna (miniseries) =

2024 Brazilian television miniseries on Ayrton Senna

- Promotional release poster
- Genre: Drama
- Showrunner: Vicente Amorim
- Written by: Álvaro Campos; Gustavo Bragança; Rafael Spínola; Thais Falcão; Álvaro Mamute
- Directed by: Vicente Amorim; Júlia Rezende
- Starring: Gabriel Leone
- Country of origin: Brazil
- Original languages: Portuguese; English
- No. of episodes: 6

Production
- Executive producer: Fabiano Gullane
- Producer: Caio Gullane
- Cinematography: Azul Serra; Kaue Zilli
- Running time: 53–71 minutes
- Production companies: Gullane Entretenimento; Netflix; Senna Brands
- Budget: $170 million

Original release
- Network: Netflix
- Release: 29 November 2024

Senna is a Brazilian biographical drama television miniseries created by Vicente Amorim and directed by Amorim and Júlia Rezende, based on the life of racing driver Ayrton Senna, and starring Gabriel Leone as Senna. The series was produced by Brazilian studio Gullane Entretenimento with funding from American studio Netflix, in collaboration with the Senna family. Budgeted at $170 million, it is the most expensive Brazilian television series in history.

The series was released on Netflix on 29 November 2024. It received mixed reviews from critics, who praised Leone's performance, the production design, and the racing scenes, but criticised the character development, historical inaccuracies and perceived bias. It received a nomination for Best Foreign Language Series at the 30th Critics' Choice Awards.

== Plot ==
The series follows Senna's life from the beginning of his racing career in karting to his untimely death at the 1994 San Marino Grand Prix. Particular emphasis is paid to Senna's relationship with his parents and girlfriend Xuxa Meneghel, rivalry with Alain Prost, feud with Jean-Marie Balestre, and complex relationship with the sensationalist racing media.

== Episodes ==
No.	Title	Duration	Original release date
1	"Calling" (Vocação)	61 min	29 November 2024
Teenage sensation Ayrton Senna da Silva (then known as Ayrton da Silva) nearly wins the 1979 Karting World Championship, but Jean-Marie Balestre's FIA denies Senna a share of the title with an illogical tiebreaker. To pursue his dream of reaching Formula One, Senna moves to England to compete in the Formula Ford junior series. His girlfriend Lilian agrees to marry him after he promises to return to Brazil after a year. Despite opposition from jingoistic British fans and racing journalists, Senna wins the title. He honors his promise to come home, but is inspired to return to Europe after Nelson Piquet wins the 1981 F1 title for Brazil.
2	"Belonging" (Determinação)	66 min	29 November 2024
Senna wins the Formula Three title after a last-minute cross-continent drive to Italy to pick up an engine upgrade, and is promoted to Formula One for 1984. However, Lilian divorces him. The trip inspires him to adopt his mother's Italian surname (Senna) professionally. He joins also-ran Toleman after British sponsors force Team Lotus to sign a British driver and Piquet vetoes him from Brabham. Niki Lauda, who also started with a small team, advises Senna that the best way to get noticed by a big team is to do well at the Monaco Grand Prix. Senna delivers by outracing F1's superstars at the rain-affected 1984 race. He finishes second after Balestre pressures Jacky Ickx to halt the race just as Senna is about to overtake Alain Prost. The performance gives Lotus the leverage to sign Senna for 1985.
3	"Ambition" (Ambição)	71 min	29 November 2024
Despite more unfair rulings from Balestre, Senna quickly makes his mark by winning his second race at Lotus. Even so, Prost wins the 1985 and 1986 titles in his powerful McLaren. Senna joins McLaren in 1988 and persuades Soichiro Honda to supply the team with the dominant Honda engines, although Honda worries that Prost will not gel with Senna. The McLaren-Honda combination crushes all opponents in 1988. Senna gets out to a large lead, but crashes out of the Monaco Grand Prix, and Prost mounts a furious rally. A downbeat Senna is inspired by conversations with his mother and former teammate Terry Fullerton. Ahead of the Japanese Grand Prix, Prost disrupts Senna with mind games, but Senna's superior skills in the rain give him the race and the title. He returns to Brazil a national hero.
4	"Passion" (Paixão)	53 min	29 November 2024
Senna begins dating television superstar Xuxa, who invites him to appear on her TV show. Although both lovers travel constantly, they try to make the relationship work. Senna's other relationship, with Prost, implodes in 1989. Prost leaks internal disputes about the Imola race to the press and publicly alleges that the team is favoring Senna. However, Senna's car fails multiple times, giving Prost the title lead. To focus on beating Prost, Senna reneges on a promise to visit Xuxa in New York. Suzuka is a must-win race for Senna, but Prost collides with Senna when the latter tries to overtake him. Senna wins the race anyway, but Prost persuades Balestre to disqualify Senna on a technicality, making Prost World Champion. Xuxa wants to fly to Japan to comfort Senna, but is too busy. She decides that the relationship is doomed, and breaks up with Senna after the season. Prost leaves McLaren for Ferrari.
5	"Hero" (Herói)	69 min	29 November 2024
In 1990, the Senna-Prost title race once again comes down to Suzuka. Despite the other drivers' disapproval of Balestre's prior rulings, Balestre issues yet another ruling favoring Prost over Senna. In retaliation, Senna clinches the title by crashing into Prost. The drivers exchange a furious, but knowing, look and stalk off to the pits together in silence. Senna reconciles with Xuxa, but only as friends, and begins dating Adriane Galisteu. When a working-class boy inspires him with fan mail, Senna grows more interested in charity work. Senna spends the next three years battling Williams-Renault, which surpasses McLaren in 1991. Senna hangs on to win his first Brazilian GP and his third title in 1991, but Williams wins the 1992 and 1993 titles. Adding insult to injury, Prost joins Williams, vetoes Senna from the team, and wins the 1993 drivers' title. Following Prost's retirement, Senna joins Williams for 1994.
6	"Time" (Tempo)	58 min	29 November 2024
Formula One abruptly changes its 1994 regulations to limit Williams' dominance. With little time to prepare, the 1994 cars are noticeably less safe. In addition, at Imola, the circuit is in poor condition. Before the race, Rubens Barrichello (Senna's protege) and Roland Ratzenberger both crash, and the latter is killed. Senna rallies the other drivers to organize for driver safety, helping him patch up his relationships with Prost and Laura Harrison, a racing pundit who Senna resents for sensationalizing the Senna-Prost rivalry. However, the FIA refuses to call off the race, and Senna fatally crashes. Harrison mails Senna's parents a message that Senna recorded for her before his death, in which he explains that he loves racing because it connects him to his family and community. In archive footage, the real-life Senna encourages people to pursue their goals with determination.

== Cast ==
=== Family ===
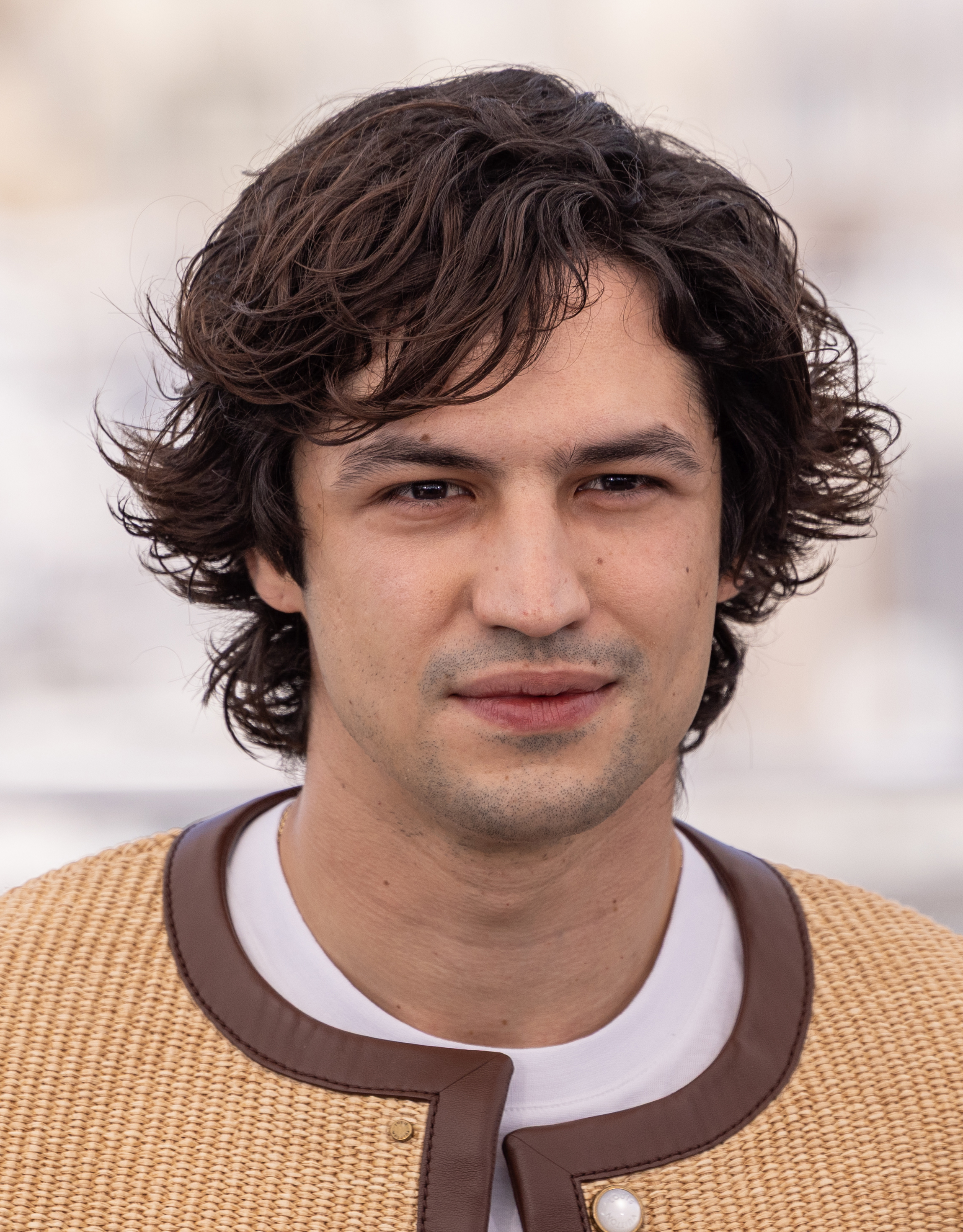
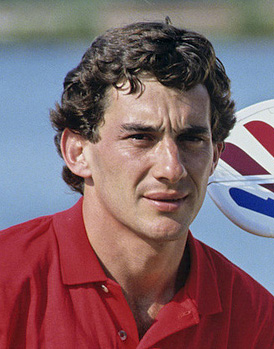
Gabriel Leone (left) plays Ayrton Senna
- Gabriel Leone as Ayrton Senna
- Camila Márdila as Viviane Senna, Senna's sister
- Sophia Turini as Viviane Senna’s sister during childhood
- Susana Ribeiro as Neyde Joana Senna, Senna's mother
- Marco Ricca as Milton Guirado Theodoro da Silva, Senna's father
- Nicolas Cruz as Leonardo Senna, Senna's brother

=== Friends ===
- Alice Wegmann as Lílian de Vasconcellos Souza, who briefly marries Senna
- Pâmela Tomé as Xuxa Meneghel, Senna's longtime girlfriend
- Julia Foti as Adriane Galisteu, Senna's girlfriend from 1993 to 1994 at the time of his death.
- Christian Malheiros as Maurinho, Senna's friend

=== Media ===
- Kaya Scodelario as Laura Harrison, a British-Brazilian racing reporter (a fictional composite character)
- Gabriel Louchard as Galvão Bueno, a Brazilian racing broadcaster
- Leon Ockenden as James Hunt, a British racing broadcaster and the 1976 Formula One World Champion
- Joe Hurst as Keith Sutton, a racing photographer who helps promote Senna's junior career

=== Racing industry ===
- Arnaud Viard as Jean-Marie Balestre, FIA president and Senna's nemesis
- Rob Compton as Terry Fullerton, Senna's rival in karting, teammate, and friend
- Nahuel Monasterio as Enrique Mansilla, Senna's rival in Formula Ford
- James Marlowe as Ralph Firman Sr., Senna's team boss in Formula Ford
- Charlie Hamblett as Martin Brundle, Senna's rival in Formula Three
- Daniel Crossley as Dick Bennetts, Senna's team boss in Formula Three
- Tom McKay as Alex Hawkridge, Senna's team boss at Toleman
- Richard Clothier as Peter Warr, Senna's team boss at Lotus
- Matt Mella as Alain Prost, Senna's rival in Formula One and McLaren teammate
- Johannes Heinrichs as Niki Lauda, a three-time Formula One World Champion who gives Senna advice
- Hugo Bonemer as Nelson Piquet, the second Brazilian Formula One World Champion
- Keisuke Hoashi as Osamu Gotō, Honda's chief engineer at Lotus and McLaren
- Patrick Kennedy as Ron Dennis, Senna's team boss at McLaren
- Felix Mayr as Gerhard Berger, Senna's McLaren teammate and close friend
- Gastón Frías as Damon Hill, Senna's Williams teammate
- Steven Mackintosh as Frank Williams, Senna's team boss at Williams
- Tom Mannion as Sid Watkins, Formula One's chief doctor and Senna's friend
- Felipe Prioli as Riccardo Patrese, F1 driver
- João Maestri as Rubens Barrichello, F1 driver
- Lucca Messer as Roland Ratzenberger, F1 driver
- Murray Walker as himself (archival audio and footage)

== Production ==
In September 2020, Netflix announced that it was funding "the first fictional drama" about Ayrton Senna's life, and that the series would be produced by Brazilian studio Gullane Entretenimento in collaboration with the Senna family. Caio Gullane served as producer and Fabiano Gullane served as executive producer. Viviane Senna said that "the Senna family is committed in making this project something totally unique and unprecedented."

"Someone said something really interesting that put it all into perspective [while filming], which was any Brazilian over the age of 35 knows where they were at two points in their life, 9/11 and Senna’s death ... I was like, okay, that’s the level of what we’re dealing with here."

— Matt Mella (actor for Alain Prost)

Although the series was initially scheduled to debut in 2022, production was put on hold due to the Covid-19 pandemic. In August 2022, Netflix hired Vicente Amorim (previously Good and Yakuza Princess) as the showrunner. As a Brazilian and longtime motorsport fan, Amorim was already familiar with Senna's career. He said that while Formula One had many "idols" throughout its history, Senna was its only true "hero," as he not only was talented but also "perceived time ... in a completely different way from all the rest of us." He added that he wanted to tell a story about how Senna conquered Formula One, which "had always been rigged to favor European drivers" before Senna arrived. Amorim interviewed Senna's family members to "learn more about Ayrton as a man," and was given "unprecedented access to Senna's personal archives," including recordings of phone calls and letters from Senna's junior career in England.

According to the Associated Press, Netflix spent more than $170 million to produce the series. Variety reported that Senna is the most expensive Brazilian television series in history. Gabriel Leone was cast as Senna in March 2023; he had previously worked with Amorim in the Brazilian film industry. In October 2023, Netflix announced that Amorim had finished hiring the main cast. When the cast list was released, Motor Sport remarked that it included "almost every on-track rival, partner, friend and team boss," as well as numerous individuals from Senna's personal life.

Filming began in late 2023. The series was shot in São Paulo and Angra dos Reis, with additional filming taking place in Argentina, Uruguay, and Northern Ireland. To create period-accurate cars, Gullane hired Argentine manufacturer Crespi Automotive to build 22 replica cars for the series, including copies of every car Senna raced in his career. Additional background cars were created with CGI, when necessary. To prepare for their driving scenes, the actors trained in go-karts several times a week.

The series was initially set for eight episodes, but ultimately only six episodes were released.

== Release ==
On 1 February 2024, Netflix debuted a clip from the series as part of its 2024 Series and Film Preview. It released a teaser trailer on 30 April 2024 and a full trailer on 29 October 2024. The series was released on Netflix's streaming platform on 29 November 2024.

Following the release, Gullane contracted to produce a feature-length documentary about Senna's early career, to be directed by Pedro Rodrigues. Gullane and children's TV channel Gloob also agreed to make a season of an animated Senninha series.

== Reception ==
On the review aggregator website Rotten Tomatoes, 36% of 11 critics' reviews are positive, with an average rating of 5.0/10. At Metacritic, the series received a weighted average score of 50 out of 100, based on 9 critics, indicating "mixed or average" reviews.

Critics praised Leone's performance. The Daily Telegraph noted that "not only is [Leone] a dead ringer for Senna, but he has also plainly done his research, with mannerisms and cadences all present and correct." The series' visuals and cinematography were also praised, especially the historically accurate production design and the racing scenes. RaceFans noted that Senna was the rare television series (in contrast to feature films) to genuinely attempt to recreate races, and Radio Times called the racing "propulsive, nail-biting and beautifully realised, with a real sense of the danger involved."

However, critics generally felt that the characters (including Senna himself) lacked depth, with the possible exception of Xuxa. Several outlets argued that the series verged on the hagiographic, opining that it "reveal[ed] little [about Senna] beyond his relentless will to win" and lacked "interest in Senna's flaws, his genius, his childhood [] or his psychology," as well as his real-life reputation for dangerous driving. Decider suggested that the series lacked narrative tension because "while short," the real Senna's "life was mostly filled with success." Several critics negatively compared the series to the award-winning 2010 Senna documentary, although Time noted that the series was able to "fill[] in some of the off-track gaps that [the documentary] leaves out," particularly with respect to Senna's early life and career.

The series' treatment of the Senna-Prost rivalry received mixed reviews. The Associated Press praised the miniseries' coverage of the rivalry, noting that it covered Prost and Senna's friendship at the end of Prost's career. However, The Times described the Senna-Prost scenes as "rather surface," and Motor Sport argued that the narrative was one-sided in Senna's favor. RaceFans added that the series downplayed Prost's raw talent to focus on the fact that Prost often had better cars than Senna. Adam Sweeting quipped that "Maybe Prost should get somebody to make a series about him, to show the flipside of the story."

Gergely Herpai "BadSector" gave it a rather favorable 7.2, "GOOD" score on theGeek.games, stating "With its six one-hour episodes, Senna gets off to a flying start but falls deeper and deeper into the trap of sports history clichés as it progresses. Still, the series could be an ideal choice for a family holiday evening, with the ripping sounds of Formula 1 engines in the background while everyone else is busy doing something else."

=== Adriane Galisteu controversy ===
The series was criticized on Brazilian social media for giving Senna's final girlfriend Adriane Galisteu a smaller amount of screen time, as opposed to Xuxa, whose romance with Senna dominated the fourth episode. According to Metrópoles, Galisteu's limited screentime was a compromise between the producers, who felt Galisteu should be in the series, and the Senna family, which disagreed. Following the release of the series, Galisteu issued a statement on social media: "My relationship with him was the last year and a half of his life. However, it was by my side, and this story also belongs to me. And it was also a story lived intensely, full of love, full of fun. A completely different Ayrton from what you've seen before."

=== Awards and nominations ===
Year	Award	Category	Nominee	Result	Ref.
2025	Platino Awards	Best Ibero-American Miniseries or TV series	Senna	Nominated	
2025	Platino Awards	Best Series Creator	Vicente Amorim, Fernando Coimbra, Luiz Bolognesi, Patrícia Andrade	Won	
2025	Platino Awards	Best Actor in a Miniseries or TV series	Gabriel Leone	Nominated	
2025	Platino Awards	Best Supporting Actor in a Miniseries or TV series	Hugo Bonemer	Nominated	
2025	Golden Trailer Awards	Best Action (Trailer/Teaser) for a TV/Streaming Series	Netflix / GrandSon (for "Forever")	Won	
2025	Golden Trailer Awards	Best Sound Editing (Trailer/Teaser) for a TV/Streaming Series	Netflix / GrandSon (for "Forever")	Won	

== See also ==
- Senna (film)
