= Rensga Hits! =

Brazilian television series

- Genre: Musical drama
- Created by: Carolina Alckmin; Denis Nielsen
- Written by: Bia Crespo; Natalia Ponto Cruz; Otavio Chamorro; Victor Colin
- Directed by: Leandro Neri; Carol Durão
- Starring: Alice Wegmann; Deborah Secco; Lorena Comparato; Fabiana Karla
- Country of origin: Brazil
- Original language: Portuguese
- No. of seasons: 3
- No. of episodes: 24

Production
- Producer: Mayra Lucas
- Production company: Glaz Entretenimento

Original release
- Network: Globoplay
- Release: 3 August 2022 – 10 July 2025

Rensga Hits! is a Brazilian musical drama television series created by Carolina Alckmin and Denis Nielsen. It aired on Globoplay from 3 August 2022 to 10 July 2025. The series is inspired by the industry of the Sertanejo music style in Brazil. It stars Alice Wegmann, Deborah Secco, Lorena Comparato and Fabiana Karla.

== Cast ==
=== Main ===
- Alice Wegmann as Raíssa Bárbara Medeiros, a dreamy young singer from the countryside who, after being abandoned at the altar by her ex-fiancé, moves to Goiânia to fulfill her dream of becoming a star in the female Sertanejo music industry, better known as Feminejo. At the end of the first season, it is revealed that she is the biological sister of her biggest rival, Gláucia Figueira, on their father's side. As a result, the two set aside their differences and form a successful Sertanejo music duo known as Gláucia & Raissa, focusing on the Sertanejo Universitário and Feminejo styles.
- Deborah Secco as Marlene Sampaio, a former singer who became a successful songwriter and businesswoman in the Sertanejo music industry. She is the founder of Rensga Hits!, a Sertanejo music record label to which Raissa is signed. Her rival is Helena Maravilha, another powerful businesswoman in the Sertanejo music industry. It is revealed later that she and Helena were a country duo known as As Goianiras, but for obscure reasons, the two fought and became rivals.
- Lorena Comparato as Gláucia Figueira, a beautiful Sertanejo music singer who is a rising star of Feminejo and is considered the main rival of Raissa, being signed with Joia Maravilha Records, a country music label that is the main rival label of Rensga Hits!. However, in the midst of this rivalry with Raissa and the search for stardom, it is revealed that Gláucia has a secret: she is bisexual. At the end of the first season, it is revealed that Raissa is her biological sister on their father's side. As a result, the two set aside their differences and form a successful Sertanejo music duo known as Gláucia & Raissa, focusing on the Sertanejo Universitário and Feminejo styles.
- Fabiana Karla as Helena Maravilha, an ambitious former singer turned powerful businesswoman who is the founder and owner of Joia Maravilha Records. She is the main rival of Marlene Sampaio, the founder and owner of Rensga Hits!, and competes with her to see who is the most powerful businesswoman in the entire Sertanejo industry. It is revealed later that she and Marlene were a country duo known as As Goianiras, but for obscure reasons, the two fought and became rivals.
- Maurício Destri as Enzzo Gabriel
- Mouhamed Harfouch as Isaías Silva
- Alejandro Claveaux as Deivid Cafajeste
- Jeniffer Dias as Thamyres "Thamy"
- Sidney Santiago as Theo
- Maíra Azevedo as Carol
- Samuel de Assis as Kevin Costa

=== Recurring and guest stars ===
- Ernani Moraes as Zé Roberto Figueira "Guarariba"
- Lúcia Veríssimo as Maria Abadia Medeiros
- Rafa Kalimann as Paloma
- Ivan Mendes as Rodrigo Rodrigues
- Stella Miranda as Maria Alvina Medeiros
- Guida Vianna as Maria Amália Medeiros
- Naiara Azevedo as herself
- Gabeu as himself
- Gali Galó as himself

== Episodes ==
Season	Episodes	Originally released	
Season	Episodes	First released	Last released
1	8	3 August 2022	18 August 2022
2	8	26 September 2024	10 October 2024
3	8	10 July 2025	

=== Season 1 (2022) ===
No. overall	No. in season	Title	Original release date
1	1	"No Dia Em Que Eu Saí De Casa"	3 August 2022
2	2	"Cachaça Com Limão Para Espantar A Solidão"	3 August 2022
3	3	"Se O Que Dói Em Mim Doesse Em Você"	3 August 2022
4	4	"Depois Da Cama, A Realidade"	3 August 2022
5	5	"Amiga, Cê Tava Bebaça!"	11 August 2022
6	6	"Chega De Mentiras"	11 August 2022
7	7	"Não Aprendi A Dizer Adeus"	18 August 2022
8	8	"Eu Vou Com Tudo, Hoje Eu Não Fico De Fora"	18 August 2022

=== Season 2 (2024) ===
No. overall	No. in season	Title	Original release date
9	1	"Acordo de damas"	26 September 2024
10	2	"Mais que irmãos, brothers"	26 September 2024
11	3	"Um solteirão e um bebê"	26 September 2024
12	4	"Casa cheia"	26 September 2024
13	5	"Save the espetinho"	4 October 2024
14	6	"Before Goiânia"	4 October 2024
15	7	"Mulher idea"	10 October 2024
16	8	"São João de Goiânia"	10 October 2024

=== Season 3 (2025) ===
No. overall	No. in season	Title	Original release date
17	1	"O destino é um só"	10 July 2025
18	2	"Combo perfeito para iludir"	10 July 2025
19	3	"Certeza eu superei"	10 July 2025
20	4	"Coração atravessado"	10 July 2025
21	5	"É hora de parar com a presepada"	10 July 2025
22	6	"E eu aqui nesta solidão"	10 July 2025
23	7	"Na saúde, na tristeza, na alegria e na cama"	10 July 2025
24	8	"Só quero ouvir você dizer que sim"	10 July 2025

== Release ==
To promote the release of the series, TV Globo aired the first two episodes on 3 August 2022. The broadcast brought record ratings for Globo, with 22 points in Rio de Janeiro and 21 in São Paulo, which represented the highest ratings for the channel in more than a year (May of the previous year). On Globoplay, two episodes were released weekly, with the first-season finale being released on 18 August 2022. The first season aired on TV Globo from 21 August until 1 September 2023.

== Music ==
Rensga Hits!

Soundtrack album by various artists
- Released: 5 August 2022
- Length: 29:10
- Producer: Dudu Borges

The soundtrack of the series was released on 5 August 2022.

No.	Title	Writer(s)	Artist(s)	Length
1.	"De Novo Não"	Bibi; César Lemos; Davi Ávila	Alice Wegmann	2:58
2.	"Coragem"	Bibi; César Lemos; Paula Mattos	Alice Wegmann and Alejandro Claveaux	2:47
3.	"Disfarce"	Bibi; Day Camargo; Lara Menezes	Lorena Comparato and Mouhamed Harfouch	2:58
4.	"Desatola Bandida"	Bibi; César Lemos; Paula Mattos	Alice Wegmann and Lorena Comparato	2:42
5.	"Pássaro sem ninho"	Bibi; César Lemos; Davi Ávila	Alice Wegmann and Lorena Comparato	3:51
6.	"Nota 100 – Tudo Bem, Acontece"	Bibi; César Lemos; Davi Ávila; Day Camargo; Lara Menezes	Alice Wegmann and Lorena Comparato	2:36
7.	"Doideira na Banheira"	Bibi; Gabriel Agra	Alejandro Claveaux	3:16
8.	"Partiu Paraíso"	Bibi; César Lemos; Paula Mattos	Sidney Santiago e Jennifer Dias	2:15
9.	"Réu Primário"	Bibi; Gabriel Agra	Maurício Destri	2:55
10.	"Tempo Esgotado"	Bibi; Gabriel Agra	Alejandro Claveaux	2:47
Total length:				29:10
