= Ligações Perigosas =

- Created by: Manuela Dias, inspired on the classic Les liaisons dangereuses by Choderlos de Laclos
- Starring: Patrícia Pillar; Selton Mello; Marjorie Estiano; Alice Wegmann; Jesuíta Barbosa; Aracy Balabanian; Renato Góes; Leopoldo Pacheco
- Country of origin: Brazil
- Original language: Portuguese
- No. of episodes: 10

Original release
- Network: Rede Globo
- Release: January 5 – January 15, 2016

Ligações Perigosas is a 2016 Brazilian miniseries produced and broadcast by Rede Globo in 10 chapters. It was based on the classic 1782 French novel Les Liaisons dangereuses, by Pierre Choderlos de Laclos.

Written by Manuela Dias, collaboration by Maria Helena Nascimento and Walter Daguerre, text supervision by Duca Rachid, direction by Vinicius Coimbra and Denise Saraceni.

Starring Patrícia Pillar, Marjorie Estiano, Selton Mello, Alice Wegmann, Jesuíta Barbosa, Aracy Balabanian, Yanna Lavigne and Renato Góes.

== Plot ==
In a luxurious and sophisticated environment, Isabel and Augusto play seduction games without any commitment. Rich, elegant and amoral, they involve other people in their pleasure games to prove they are not as influenced or disposable as the others. They also compete to see who is the most successful in the art of seduction. Until an unexpected element unsettles their partnership: from the height of their arrogance, neither can imagine that love will irreversibly affect both of them.

== Production ==
The refinement and glamour of the story are reflected in the images of the miniseries, which was entirely shot and post-produced in 4K. In addition to contributing to the audience's experience, UHD allows productions to take great artistic leaps, getting much closer to what you currently see in the movies. The luxury environment is reflected also in the grandeur of the sets and locations of the plot, which was shot in Rio de Janeiro, Argentina, and Uruguay. Nearly 30 staff members, ten actors, and more than 600 kilograms of luggage and equipment landed in Puerto Madryn, Patagonia. The team also shot in Santa Candida Palace, in Concepción del Uruguay. Founded in 1847, the construction by Italian architect Pedro Fossati is considered a national historic monument. In the plot, the palace belongs to the aunt of bon vivant Augusto de Valmont.

== Cast ==
Actor/Actress	Character
Patrícia Pillar	Isabel D'Ávila de Alencar
Selton Mello	Augusto de Valmont
Marjorie Estiano	Mariana de Santanna
Alice Wegmann	Cecília Mata Medeiros
Jesuíta Barbosa	Felipe Labarte
Leopoldo Pacheco	Heitor Damasceno
Aracy Balabanian	Consuelo
Renato Góes	Vicente
Yanna Lavigne	Júlia
Lavínia Pannunzio	Iolanda Mata Medeiros
Danilo Grangheia	Otávio Lemos
Alice Assef	Vitória
Hanna Romanazzi	Sofia
Mario José Paz	Marquês D'Ávila de Alencar
Camilla Amado	Madre
Mario Borges	Padre Anselmo
Darwin del Fabro	Collete D'or (Astolfo Lemos)
Keli Freitas	Emília
Isabella Santoni	Isabel D'Ávila de Alencar (young)
Ghilherme Lobo	Augusto de Valmont (young)
