= Melhores do Ano =

- Current logo.
- Awarded for: Excellence in dramaturgy and music.
- Location: Estúdios Globo, Rio de Janeiro
- Country: Brazil
- Hosted by: Luciano Huck
- Act: Various
- Reward: Mário Lago Trophy
- First award: 1995
- Final award: 2018 (currently)

Highlights
- Most awards: Dramaturgy: A Força do Querer (8); Entertainment: Ivete Sangalo (11)
- Most nominations: Dramaturgy: A Força do Querer (18); Entertainment: Ivete Sangalo (19)
- Website: gshow.globo.com/programas/domingao-do-faustao/melhores-do-ano/

Television/radio coverage
- Network: Rede Globo

Melhores do Ano Troféu Domingão, or just Melhores do Ano (Best of the Year), is an annual awards ceremony presented by TV Globo. Viewers vote on three artists who have been brilliant and successful during the year on the network, in music and in sports. Nominees are previously chosen by the network's executives and the top three go to the public vote. The prize is equivalent to a Golden Globe Award in Brazil because of the network's name.

== Broadcast ==
Originally, the awards were always broadcast on the last Sunday of the year, during Domingão do Faustão, until 2007. From 2008 to 2014, it was held in late March, when the awards were brought back to December. In 2021, the presentation moved to Domingão com Huck.

== Categories ==
=== Current categories ===
- Best telenovela actor (1995–present)
- Best telenovela actress (1995–present)
- Best supporting actor (1996–present)
- Best supporting actress (1996–present)
- Best new actor (1995–present)
- Best new actress (1996–present)
- Best actor in a TV series or miniseries (2014–present)
- Best actress in a TV series or miniseries (2014–present)
- Best young actor/actress (2002–present)
- Best female singer (1999–present)
- Best male singer (1999–present)
- Best journalist (2003–present)
- Song of the Year (1995–present)
- Best comedy actor/actress (1995–present)
- Best fictional character (2016–present)

=== Former categories ===
- Best reporter (2014)
- Best band or duo (1999–2011)
- Best new musician (1998–2011)
- Best sportsman/sportswoman (2003–2009)
- Best special effects (2002)
- Best female contestant in a reality show (2002)
- Best male contestant in a reality show (2002)
- Best character's theme song (2002)
- Best opening theme song (2001–2002)
- Best telenovela song (2001–2007)
- Album of the Year (1999–2000)
- Star of the Year (1999–2000)
- Success of the Year (1995–1996)

== Achievements ==
=== Telenovelas with more awards ===
Position	Telenovela	Awards
1	A Força do Querer	8
2	América	7
3	Amor à Vida	6
3	Paraíso Tropical	6
4	Avenida Brasil	5
4	Império	5
4	Laços de Família	5
4	Mulheres Apaixonadas	5
4	O Beijo do Vampiro	5
4	Terra Nostra	5
5	A Favorita	4
5	Cobras & Lagartos	4
5	O Clone	4
5	O Rei do Gado	4
5	Senhora do Destino	4
5	Ti Ti Ti	4
5	Torre de Babel	4
5	Viver a Vida	4
5	Êta Mundo Bom!	4

=== Telenovelas with more nominations ===
Position	Telenovela	Nominations
1	A Força do Querer	18
2	Avenida Brasil	17
2	Paraíso Tropical	17
3	Amor à Vida	14
3	Mulheres Apaixonadas	14
4	América	13
5	A Favorita	12
5	Passione	12
6	Caminho das Índias	11

=== Artists with more awards ===
Artist	Awards
Ivete Sangalo	11
Luan Santana	9
Bruno Gagliasso	5
Cláudia Rodrigues	5
Fátima Bernardes	5
Victor & Leo	5
Adriana Esteves	4
Cláudia Leitte	4
Daniel	4
Alexandre Borges	3
Anitta	3
Bruna Marquezine	3
Bruno e Marrone	3
Jota Quest	3
Leonardo	3
Leandro Hassum	3
Murilo Benício	3
NX Zero	3
Tom Cavalcante	3
Tony Ramos	3
Vladimir Brichta	3

=== Artists with more nominations ===
Artist	Nom.
Ivete Sangalo	19
Luan Santana	11
Tony Ramos	10
Bruno Gagliasso	8
Daniel	7
Fátima Bernardes	7
Victor & Leo	7
Leandro Hassum	6
Murilo Benício	6
William Bonner	6
Cláudia Leitte	6
Antônio Fagundes	5
Cauã Reymond	5
Cláudia Rodrigues	5
Adriana Esteves	4
Alexandre Borges	4
Anitta	4
Lázaro Ramos	4
Lília Cabral	4
Mel Maia	4
Paula Fernandes	4
Susana Vieira	4
Alexandre Nero	3
Bruna Linzmeyer	3
Bruna Marquezine	3
Raul Cortez	3
Christiane Torloni	3
Cláudia Abreu	3
Cláudia Raia	3
Deborah Secco	3
Fábio Assunção	3
Giovanna Antonelli	3
Klara Castanho	3
Juliano Cazarré	3
Marina Ruy Barbosa	3
Renata Vasconcellos	3
Rodrigo Lombardi	3
Sandra Annenberg	3
Taís Araújo	3
Vera Holtz	3
