= Gurjão =

Coordinates: 7.24694°S 36.4889°W

- Municipality
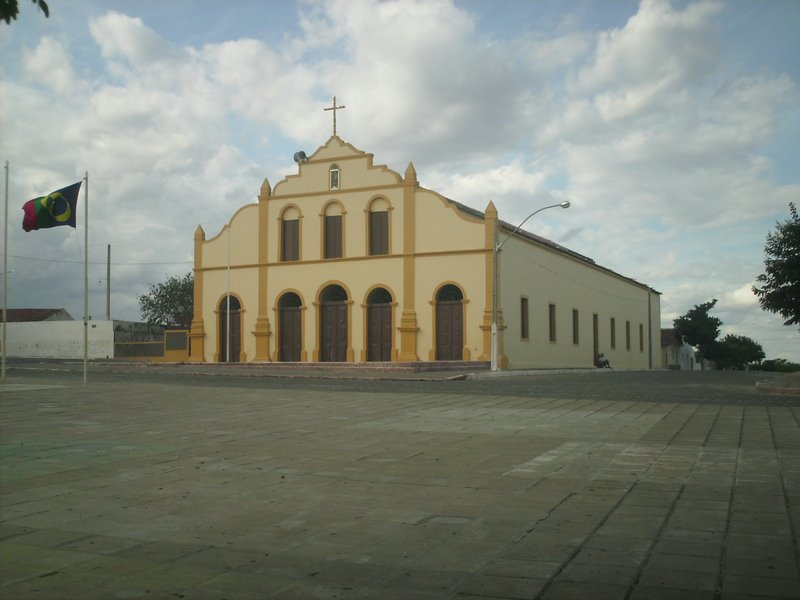

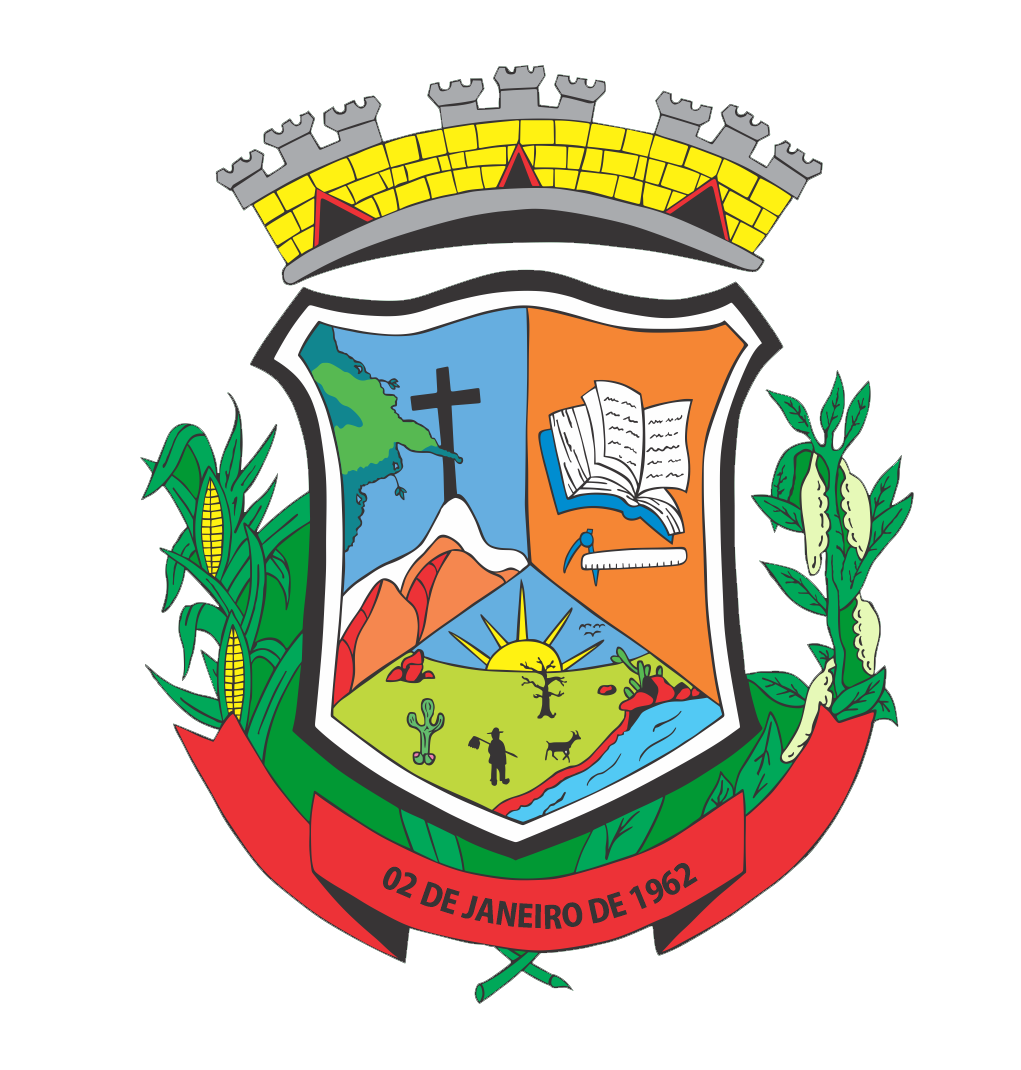
- Flag Coat of arms
- Interactive map of Gurjão
- Country: Brazil
- Region: South
- State: Paraíba
- Mesoregion: Boborema

Population (2020)
  - Total: 3,453
- Time zone: UTC−3 (BRT)

Gurjão (Central northeastern portuguese pronunciation: [ɡuɦˈʒɐ̃w]) is a municipality in the state of Paraíba in the Northeast Region of Brazil.

== See also ==
- List of municipalities in Paraíba
