= A Força do Querer =

Brazilian telenovela by Glória Perez

- Also known as: Edge of Desire
- Genre: Telenovela; Romance
- Created by: Glória Perez
- Directed by: Rogério Gomes; Pedro Vasconcelos
- Creative director: Rogério Gomes
- Starring: Lilia Cabral; Maria Fernanda Cândido; Juliana Paes; Isis Valverde; Paolla Oliveira; Humberto Martins; Dan Stulbach; Rodrigo Lombardi; Marco Pigossi; Fiuk; Bruna Linzmeyer; Emilio Dantas; Edson Celulari; Débora Falabella; Carol Duarte; Zezé Polessa
- Opening theme: "O Quereres" by Caetano Veloso
- Country of origin: Brazil
- Original language: Portuguese
- No. of episodes: 172 (original version); 150 (international version)

Production
- Production locations: Belém; Manaus; Rio de Janeiro
- Camera setup: Multi-camera
- Running time: 29–73 minutes
- Production company: Entretenimento Globo

Original release
- Network: Rede Globo
- Release: 3 April – 20 October 2017

A Força do Querer (English title: Edge of Desire, lit. 'The Force of Wanting') is a Brazilian telenovela produced and aired by Rede Globo from 3 April 2017 to 20 October 2017. Written by Glória Perez, directed by Rogério Gomes and Pedro Vasconcellos.

The telenovela features an ensemble cast of Isis Valverde, Marco Pigossi, Fiuk, Bruna Linzmeyer, Paolla Oliveira, Juliana Paes, Emilio Dantas, Rodrigo Lombardi, Débora Falabella, Dan Stulbach, Lilia Cabral and Maria Fernanda Cândido.

The show addresses contemporary themes that affect modern Brazilian culture, such as drug trafficking, gambling and transgender sexuality, and has received positive reception from viewers and critics.

== Production ==
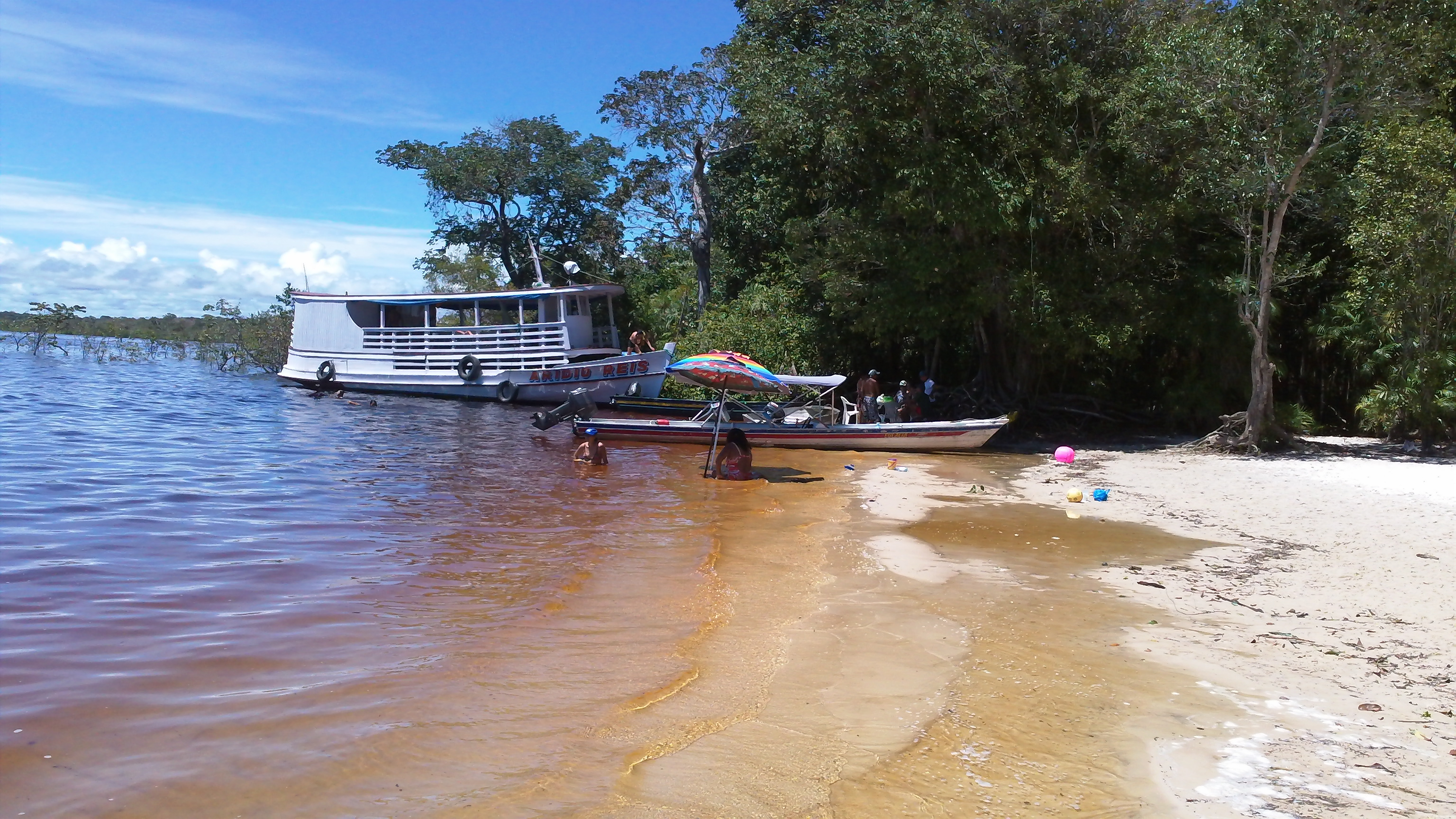
Indaruba served as a filming site for the fictitious town of Parazinho.

In April 2016, Glória Perez announced her next telenovela, due to premiere in the first half of 2017. She also stated that it would be different from the ones she had produced in the previous 20 years, which featured different settings and culture-oriented storylines. A Força do Querer mainly features romance and is entirely shot in Brazil. Originally titled À Flor da Pele during early stages of production, it was changed to Flor do Querer in November 2016 and to the current title in December 2016.

=== Casting ===
Paolla Oliveira was the first to be cast for the project, and was announced to star in the telenovela in March 2016. Fábio Assunção was originally cast to portray Eugênio but later declined in order to star in a then upcoming television series. Dan Stulbach was then cast. Leopoldo Pacheco was originally cast as Junqueira but he and Chay Suede preferred Novo Mundo. Suede was the first option to portray Ruy. Daniel Rocha also auditioned for the role of Ruy but Fiuk was preferred over him. Vera Fischer was also cast but due to personal differences with the showrunner, she was replaced by Betty Faria.

The character of Bibi was inspired by Fabiana Escobar, known as "queen of pot". Showrunner Glória Perez initially wanted the character to be the center of a separate miniseries but decided to include it in the telenovela.

Since her role is inspired by a siren, Isis Valverde was prepared for three months in readiness for her character by, Mirella Ferraz, a professional in that part.

== Plot ==
Promising lawyer Caio is considered for administration of the Garcia Company, one of the largest in the country. However, when Bibi decides to end their relationship, he leaves everything behind, and relocates to the United States. Fifteen years later, Caio returns to Brazil to take up a position in the judiciary and once again meets Bibi, who failed to complete college and is married to Rubinho. Rubinho goes through a delicate financial condition, as he and Bibi struggle to make ends meet which forces him to enter into the world of crime.

Ruy is prepared to take over the company of his father Eugênio, as the only qualified heir. He is engaged to Cibele, who offers him professional and personal stability. When he travels to Parazinho, he is enchanted by Ritinha, a young woman who loves the fascination she exerts on men, and seems to believe herself to be a mermaid. She continues a game of seduction with Ruy despite being engaged to Zeca, a truck driver who loves her intensely despite the gossips about her activities. On the day of their wedding he learns of Ritinha's fling with Ruy. Fearing for her life, Ritinha runs away with Ruy while Zeca angrily leaves Parazinho. In another town, Zeca meets Jeiza, a police officer who dreams of becoming a mixed martial arts fighter.

Meanwhile, Ruy's brother Ivan (previously Ivana) has been undergoing female to male gender reassignment, causing conflict with their mother, Joyce. Joyce's relationship with Eugênio begins to crumble when he meets Irene, a seductive woman who tries to break their marriage. Eugênio's older brother Eurico tries to keep everyone under his control, though he can't control the gambling addiction of his wife Silvana.

== Cast ==
Actor	Character
Fiuk	Ruy Beraldo Garcia
Marco Pigossi	José Ribamar do Carmo (Zeca)
Isis Valverde	Rita Rosa Ferreira (Ritinha)
Paolla Oliveira	Jeiza Nascimento Rocha
Juliana Paes	Fabiana Duarte Feitosa (Bibi / Bibi Perigosa / Baronesa do Pó) / Soraya Guedes
Emilio Dantas	Rubens Feitosa (Rubinho / Barão do Pó) / Naldo Guedes
Rodrigo Lombardi	Caio Borges Garcia
Carol Duarte	Ivana Garcia/ Ivan Garcia
Bruna Linzmeyer	Cibele Sabóia Dantas
Débora Falabella	Irene Steiner / Solange Lima
Maria Fernanda Cândido	Joyce Garcia
Dan Stulbach	Eugênio Garcia
Lília Cabral	Silvana Garcia
Humberto Martins	Eurico Garcia
Edson Celulari	Raul Dantas Sabóia (Dantas)
Elizângela	Aurora Duarte
Zezé Polessa	Edinalva Ferreira
Tonico Pereira	Abel Simplício do Carmo
Juliana Paiva	Simone Garcia
Silvero Pereira	Raimundo Nonato da Silva (Nonato) / Elis Miranda
Gisele Fróes	Cândida Nascimento Rocha
Luci Pereira	Maria de Nazaré Pereira (Nazaré)
Cláudia Mello	Zuleide (Zu)
Karla Karenina	Benedita (Dita)
Jonathan Azevedo	Wellington Silvino (Sabiá)
Carla Diaz	Carine de Sá
João Bravo	André Duarte Feitosa (Dedé) / Yuri Guedes
Betty Faria	Elvira Gomez Garcia
Othon Bastos	Otávio Garcia
Totia Meireles	Maria Helena Borges Garcia (Heleninha)
João Camargo	Junqueira Garcia
Adriano Alves	Yuri Junqueira Garcia
Mariana Xavier	Abigail Lima Santos (Biga)
Dandara Mariana	Marilda
Maria Clara Spinelli	Miraceli Almeida (Mira)
Gabriel Stauffer	Claudio
Michelle Martins	Shirley
Pedro Nercessian	Amaro
Lua Blanco	Anita
Hylka Maria	Alessia Silvino
Betty Gofman	Jacira de Sá (Jaci)
Raul Gazolla	Allan Delano
Clarice Derzié Luz	Dr. Selma Tavares
Dig Dutra	Rochelle
Marcos Junqueira	Kikito
Daniel Zettel	Batoré
Caroline Verban	Duda
Antônio Carlos	Guto
Lucy Ramos	Leila Andrade e Silva
Gustavo Machado	Cirilo
Bruno Barbosa	Tatu
Thaty Taranto	Stella
Lorenzo Sousa	Ruy Ferreira Ribamar do Carmo (Ruyzinho)

=== Participations ===
Actor	Character
Fafá de Belém	Almerinda Pereira / Mere Star
Tarso Brant	Tê
Well Aguiar	Gerson Amadeu
Érica Paes	Herself
Rodrigo Rangel	Agiota
Danilo Sacramento	João Vicente
Marcello Airoldi	Leandro
Lucci Ferreira	Werneck
João Sabiá	Boto (in human shape)
Guilherme Weber	Douglas
Jandir Ferrari	Amílcar
Louise Marrie	Carla
Rosa Malagueta	Neide
Alejandro Claveaux	Vitor
Guilherme Duarte	Denilson Pereira Horta (DH)
Xande Valois	Zeca (child)
João Gabriel Bolshaw	Ruy (child)
Antonietta Uhebe	Ivana (child)
Laíze Câmara	Francineide
Eline Porto	Janete
Raquel Rocha	Vitória
Carolina Coutinho	Celinha
Isabela Catão	Gislene
William Vita	Comandante Cristino
Nivaldo Motta	Lourival
Benki Piyãko	Ashaninka
Luciana Borghi	Dona do Salão
Esther Jablonski	Dr Eva
Cristiane Alves	Dr Olivia
Cristiana Amadeo	Dr Tereza
Karina Mello	Cláudia Barroso
Mario Hermeto	Delegado
Natasha Stransky	Ana
Rose Lima	Luciene
Diogo Nogueira	Himself
Xande de Pilares	Himself
Wesley Safadão	Himself
Nego do Borel	Himself
Marília Mendonça	Herself
Jane di Castro	Herself
Rodrigo Minotauro	Himself
Rogério Minotouro	Himself
Mosquito	Himself
Joelma	Herself
Pabllo Vittar	Herself
Cris Cyborg	Herself
Carina Damm	Herself
Lia Sophia	Herself
Alcione	Herself (last episode)
Poliana Botelho	Herself (last episode)
Fabiana Escobar	Herself (last episode)

== Soundtrack ==
=== A Força do Querer: Vol. 1 ===
A Força do Querer: Vol. 1

Soundtrack album by Various artists
- Released: 2 June 2017
- Genres: Pop; MPB
- Length: 58:49
- Label: Som Livre

A Força do Querer: Vol. 1 is the first installment of the series of soundtracks of the telenovela.

The album consist of an original score by Roberto Carlos. "Sereia" (released on 5 April 2017) was composed specifically for the show.

No.	Title	Artist(s)	Length
1.	"O Quereres"	Caetano Veloso	3:05
2.	"Sereia"	Roberto Carlos	3:35
3.	"Te Faço um Cafuné"	Mariana Aydar	3:44
4.	"Coração Machucado Carlos"	Wesley Safadão	3:40
5.	"Eu Sei de Cor"	Marília Mendonça	2:54
6.	"Boto Namorador"	Dona Onete	4:05
7.	"Pra Você"	Roberta Sá	3:11
8.	"Flor do Ipê"	Marisa Monte	2:43
9.	"City"	Kristen Marie	3:10
10.	"True Colors"	Cyndi Lauper	3:45
11.	"Nobody But Me"	Michael Bublé	3:00
12.	"Sob Medida"	Fafá de Belém	3:42
13.	"Deixa Eu Te Amar"	Agepê	4:03
14.	"Para Uso Exclusivo da Casa"	Dhi Ribeiro	3:54
15.	"Tem Que Provar Que Merece"	Xande de Pilares	3:45
16.	"Tim Tim Por Tim Tim"	Diogo Nogueira	2:46
17.	"I Hate U, I Love U"	Gnash	3:18
18.	"Darkness and Light"	John Legend	3:49
Total length:			58:49

=== A Força do Querer: Vol. 2 ===
A Força do Querer: Vol. 2

Soundtrack album by Various artists
- Released: 4 August 2017
- Length: 62:04
- Label: Som Livre

No.	Title	Artist(s)	Length
1.	"Despacito"	Luis Fonsi feat. Daddy Yankee	3:47
2.	"Caçadora"	Lucy Alves	3:06
3.	"Up&Up"	Coldplay	3:58
4.	"Fading Away"	Adam Naas	4:07
5.	"Sign of the Times"	Harry Styles	5:40
6.	"Não Quero Despedida"	Mumuzinho	4:00
7.	"Perigosa"	Anitta	2:08
8.	"Cheguei"	Ludmilla	2:54
9.	"Rei Solano"	Mestre Solano	3:11
10.	"Simples Assim"	Lenine	3:29
11.	"Eu Te Amo"	Chico Buarque and Telma Costa	4:58
12.	"Dom de Iludir"	Nana Caymmi	1:51
13.	"Mande um Sinal"	Djavan	2:57
14.	"Olha"	Alcione	3:28
15.	"De Toda Cor"	Renato Luciano feat. Ney Matogrosso, Oswaldo Montenegro, Laila Garin and Elisa Lucinda	4:55
16.	"Waves"	Dean Lewis	4:01
17.	"Blame"	Calvin Harris feat. John Newman	3:34
Total length:			62:04

== Reception ==
=== Ratings ===
The telenovela had an average daily reach of 45 million viewers (number of people who watch at least one minute of the telenovela every day). The plot also swept across social networks and ranked first on the Social Wit List in April 2017, a ranking that highlights the most-commented releases in Latin America.

Timeslot (AT)	Eps.	Premiere		Finale		Rank	TV season	Average viewership
Timeslot (AT)	Eps.	Date	Viewers (in points)	Date	Viewers (in points)	Rank	TV season	Average viewership
Monday–Saturday; 9:15 pm	172	3 April 2017	33	20 October 2017	50	1	2017	36

On its premiere, A Força do Querer registered a viewership rating of 32.9 points, the highest premiere viewership since the 2016 debut of Velho Chico. On its first week of broadcast, it recorded an average of 32 points. It had the second-largest viewership, after Amor à Vida.

The penultimate episode, that aired on 19 October, recorded 48.8 points of average and peaking at 51 points with a 65% share, hitting the record, according to consolidated data of Ibope in Greater São Paulo. With this indices, A Força do Querer had the highest audience since the last episode of Avenida Brasil, which recorded 52 points on 19 October 2012.

On the finale, A Força do Querer had the largest audience since the end of Avenida Brasil. Having aired from 9:15 pm to 11:32 pm, the final episode had a record-setting 50.1 points and peaked at 53 points. These were the best ratings since the finale of Avenida Brasil, which had 51.7 points on 19 October 2012. In Rio de Janeiro, the last episode recorded 49 points in average (highest final indices since Império, which had 50 points).

Cumulatively, the show recorded an average rating of 35.67.

== Controversies ==
=== The state of Pará ===
Since its debut, the telenovela received criticism for not using the northeastern accents in the state of Pará and the depiction of the state, such as the existence of an aquarium located in Ver-o-Peso. There were varied opinions among the viewers, especially those from Pará. Rede Globo and show's creator Glória Perez argued that the show was not set in the capital of Pará but in the fictional city of Parazinho and that the work of fiction has no commitment to be true to reality.

=== Accusations on glamorization of drug trafficking ===
The fact that the plot touches on drug trafficking and other crime aroused the idea that the telenovela was unapologetic to such. The show received a flurry of criticism, mainly by evangelists and conservatives. Pastor and Deputy Marco Feliciano said that, "Rede Globo offered a course for banditry". Showrunner Glória Perez responded to the accusations:

It is something of people to want to put reality under the rug. Bibi became a thug. She is not the trafficker, but she is prosecuted by association with trafficking. Do you see glamour in that? The plot brings an ethical police, quite different from how it is traditionally shown in Brazilian dramas. These people [critics] bore me to death.

=== Transexuality ===
Before the debut of the telenovela, the subject of transexuality was already causing controversy. Catholic organizations asked that Globo not allow this theme in the show. The theme about gender identity, addressed in the plot by the character Ivan was also not accepted by a portion of the audience, among them also evangelists and conservatives. They accused the network of using the telenovela to popularize gender ideology.

Preceded by A Lei do Amor; 3 October 2016–31 March 2017	Globo 9 pm timeslot telenovela 3 April 2017–20 October 2017	Succeeded by O Outro Lado do Paraíso; 23 October 2017–11 May 2018
