= Maurício Destri =

Brazilian actor (born 1991)

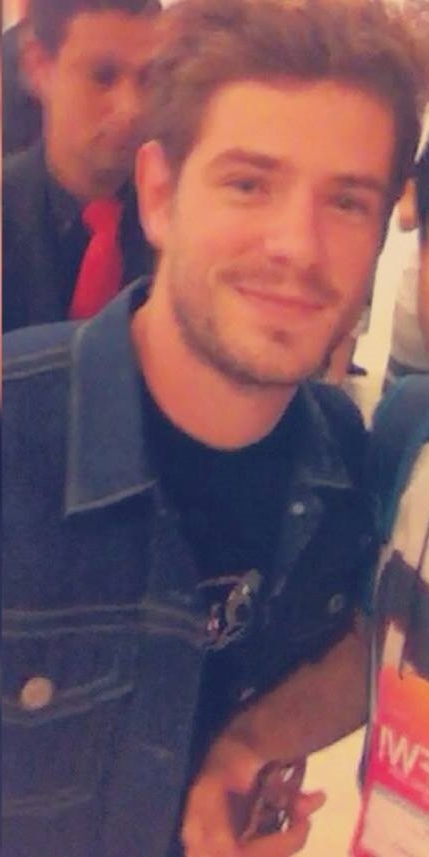
- Destri in 2015
- Born: Maurício Alves Destri; 3 September 1991 (age 34); Criciúma, Santa Catarina, Brazil
- Occupation: Actor
- Years active: 2009–present

Maurício Alves Destri (born 3 September 1991) is a Brazilian actor.

== Filmography ==
=== Television ===
Year	Title	Role
2011	Cordel Encantado	Infante Dom Inácio de Seráfia do Sul
2012	Malhação: Conectados	Kiko Freitas
2013	Sangue Bom	Vinícius Carmim Rabello "Vinny"
2015	I Love Paraisópolis	Benjamin de Albuquerque Brenner
2016	A Lei do Amor	Ciro Noronha (1st phase)
2017	Os Dias Eram Assim	Leon
2018	Orgulho e Paixão	Camilo Bittencourt
2022	Rensga Hits!	Enzzo Gabriel
2024	Luz	Professor Gael Sanches

=== Film ===
Year	Title	Role	Ref.
2013	Antes de Palavras	Célio	

=== Music videos ===
Year	Title	Artist	Ref.
2017	Flutua	Johnny Hooker (feat. Liniker)	

== Theater ==
Year	Play	Author
2009	A Força da Vida	Will Eisner
2009	O Santo e a Porca	Ariano Suassuna
2009	Seis personagens à procura de um autor	Luigi Pirandello
2010	A Vida de Galileu	Bertolt Brecht
2014	O Despertar da Primavera	Frank Wedekind

== Awards and nominations ==
Year	Award	Category	Work	Results
2015	Meus Prêmios Nick	Most handsome man of the year	Benjamin in I Love Paraisópolis	Nominated
2015	Prêmio F5	Most handsome man of the year	Benjamin in I Love Paraisópolis	Won
2015	Melhores do Ano de 2015	Best Revelation Actor	Benjamin in I Love Paraisópolis	Nominated
2016	Troféu Internet	Revelation of the year	Benjamin in I Love Paraisópolis	Nominated
2016	Prêmio Febre Teen	Best Nacional Actor	Benjamin in I Love Paraisópolis	Nominated
