= Gabriel Leone =

Brazilian actor

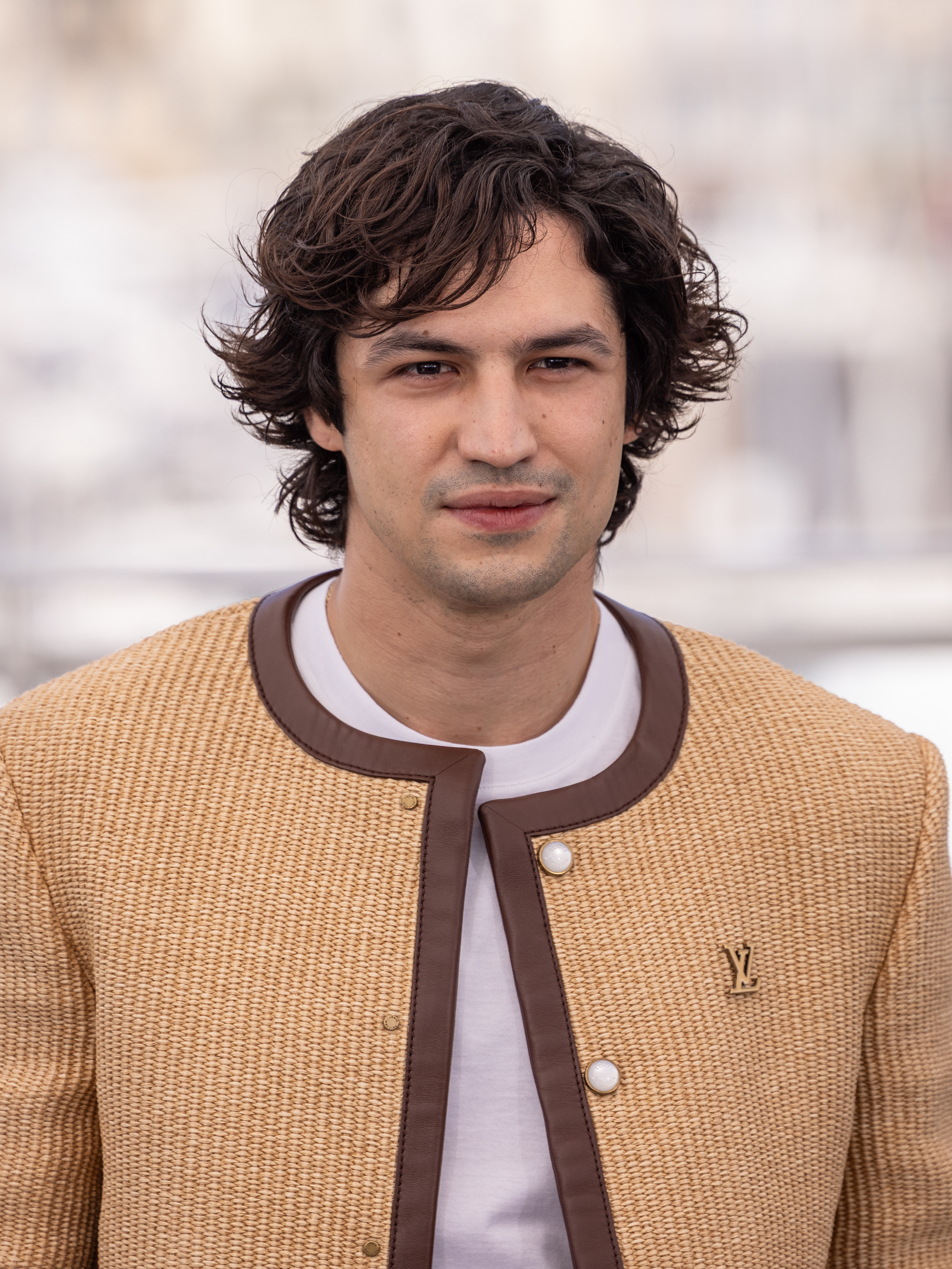
- Leone at the 2025 Cannes Film Festival
- Born: Gabriel Leone Coutinho Miranda Frota; Rio de Janeiro, Brazil
- Occupation: Actor
- Years active: 2009–present
- Spouse: Carla Salle (m. 2024)

Gabriel Leone Coutinho Miranda Frota is a Brazilian actor. He is best known internationally for his role as Ayrton Senna in the Netflix biographical series Senna.

Leone became locally known for his role in the telenovela Verdades Secretas (2015) and expanded internationally with the role of Alfonso de Portago in Michael Mann's biographical drama Ferrari. In 2025, he starred in Kleber Mendonça Filho's The Secret Agent.

== Career ==
In 2024, Leone starred as Ayrton Senna in the Netflix biographical series Senna. Reviewing the series for The Daily Telegraph, Benji Wilson noted that "not only is [Leone] a dead ringer for Senna, but he has also plainly done his research, with mannerisms and cadences all present and correct".

== Filmography ==
=== Film ===
Title	Year	Role
Garoto	2015	Garoto
Minha Fama de Mau	2019	Roberto Carlos
Mise en Scène: a Artesania do Artista	2021	Himself
Piedade	2021	Marlon Brando
Eduardo & Mônica	2022	Eduardo Sousa
Alemão 2	2022	Ciro
Além da Lenda: The Movie	2022	Lucas (Original Voice)
Meu Álbum de Amores	2022	Júlio Tavares
Meu Álbum de Amores	2022	Odilon Ricardo
Duetto	2022	Carlo
O Rio do Desejo	2023	Armando
Ferrari	2023	Alfonso de Portago
Barba Ensopada de Sangue	2024	Gabriel
The Wild Robot	2024	BrightBill (Brazilian Portuguese dub)
The Secret Agent	2025	Bobbi
The Big Fix	TBA	

=== Television ===
Title	Year	Role	Notes
The Big Family	2013	Haroldinho	Episode: "Bebel e Sua Moto"
Young Hearts	2013–14	Antônio Rocha	Season 21
Santo Forte	2014	Marco Antônio	
Hidden Truths	2015	Guilherme Lovatelli (Gui)	
Old River	2016	Miguel de Sá Ribeiro	
Dark Days	2017	Gustavo Reis	
Carcereiros	2018	Wellington Sacramento	Episode: "Ratos & Homens"
Land of the Strong	2018	Hermano Gouveia	
Tá no Ar: a TV na TV	2019	Himself	Cameo
Milton e o Clube da Esquina	2020	Host	
Verdades Secretas II	2021	Guilherme Lovatelli (Gui)	Cameo
Dom	2021–24	Pedro Machado Lomba Neto (Dom)	
In Your Place	2021–22	Felipe Soares	
Independências	2022	Miguel I of Portugal	
Senna	2024	Ayrton Senna	
Citadel	2026	Paolo Braga	

== Personal life ==
In February 2016, after being introduced by actor Alejandro Claveaux during Carnival, he and actress Carla Salle began a relationship. The couple confirmed their relationship in October 2016. Gabriel and Carla made their union official on May 18, 2024, in an intimate ceremony in Rio de Janeiro.
