= Os Dias Eram Assim =

Brazilian telenovela

- Genre: Telenovela; Drama; Romance
- Created by: Ângela Chaves; Alessandra Poggi
- Directed by: Carlos Araújo; Gustavo Fernandez
- Starring: Sophie Charlotte; Renato Góes; Daniel de Oliveira; Gabriel Leone; Maria Casadevall; Letícia Spiller; Marco Ricca; Marcos Palmeira; Mariana Lima; Carla Salle; Bárbara Reis; Maurício Destri; Natália do Valle; Suzana Vieira
- Country of origin: Brazil
- Original language: Portuguese
- No. of episodes: 88 (50 international version)

Production
- Running time: 20–48 minutes
- Production company: Estúdios Globo

Original release
- Network: TV Globo
- Release: 17 April – 18 September 2017

Os Dias Eram Assim (English title: Dark Days) is a Brazilian telenovela produced and broadcast by TV Globo. It premiered on 17 April 2017.

== Plot ==
The story begins on 21 June 1970, date of the end of the World Cup, which Brazil wins. Amid the celebrations there's a political and social contrast, promoted by the military dictatorship, where Alice (Sophie Charlotte) and Renato (Renato Góes) meet and start a love story that lasts for nearly 20 years, going through several historic events until the Diretas Já.

The doctor Renato is the eldest son of Vera (Cássia Kis), owner of a bookstore in Copacabana, and has two siblings: Gustavo (Gabriel Leone), who goes out in the streets seeking freedom, and Maria (Carla Salle), who uses art as a way of expression and manifestation.

Raised into a conservative family, Alice, a Languages student, is the daughter of Arnaldo (Antonio Calloni), a contractor and supporter of the dictatorship who works for the government, and Kiki (Natália do Vale), who are always in conflict: Arnaldo constantly blames Kiki for their daughter's rebellious nature. Alice goes against her parents' wishes and leaves her longtime boyfriend Vitor (Daniel de Oliveira), her father's right-hand man.

Infuriated by Alice's refusal to marry him, Vitor accuses Renato of subversion, which forces him to run away to Chile. He expects Alice to follow him, but she ends up not going. There, Renato meets Rimena (Maria Casadevall), a fellow doctor, with whom he has a lot in common. After the law of amnesty in 1979, Renato returns to Brazil, where he runs into Alice again, and old feelings resurface.

== Cast ==
| Actor | Character |
|---|---|
| Sophie Charlotte | Alice Sampaio Pereira |
| Renato Góes | Renato Reis |
| Daniel de Oliveira | Vitor Dumonte |
| Gabriel Leone | Gustavo Reis |
| Maria Casadevall | Rimena Garcia |
| Susana Vieira | Cora Dumonte |
| Natália do Vale | Quitéria Sampaio Pereira (Kiki) |
| Cássia Kis Magro | Vera Reis |
| Marcos Palmeira | Toni Sampaio Pereira |
| Letícia Spiller | Monique Sampaio |
| Marco Ricca | Olavo Amaral |
| Carla Salle | Maria Reis |
| Maurício Destri | León |
| Bárbara Reis | Cátia Andrade |
| Mariana Lima | Natália Andrade |
| Julia Dalavia | Fernanda Sampaio Pereira (Nanda) |
| Felipe Simas | Caique Sampaio |
| Cyria Coentro | Laura Garcia |
| Bukassa Kabengele | Josias Andrade |
| Izak Dahora | Domingos |
| Maureen Miranda | Dolores Santana |
| Ricardo Blat | Sandoval Freitas |
| Júlio Machado | Marcos |
| Xande Valois | Lucas |
| André Garolli | Padre Nuno |
| Ana Miranda | Dalva |
| Nando Rodrigues | Hugo Cabral |
| Maria Assunção | Socorro das Neves |
| Konstantinos Sarris | Rudá |
| Juliane Araújo | Ive Batista |
| Rose Abdallah | |
| Luca de Castro | |
| Thales Coutinho | |
| Mário Mendes | Jeremias Vidal |
| Isabella Koppel | Gabriela |
| Kiria Malheiros | Esperança |
| Matheus Dantas | |
| Bruno Balthazar | |
| Gustavo Damascena | |
| Alexandre Monfati | |

=== Participations ===
| Actor | Character |
|---|---|
| Antonio Calloni | Arnaldo Sampaio Pereira |
| Caio Blat | Túlio Menezes |
| Alfredo Castro | Hernando Garcia |
| Julianne Trevisol | Sara |
| Letícia Braga | Fernanda (young) |
| Alexandre Colman | Caique (young) |
| Luiz Felipe Melo | Valentim (young) |
| Maria Carolina Basilio | Gabriela (young) |
| Pedro Pupak | Lucas (young) |
| Bernardo Velasco | Rudá (young) |
| Manu Papera | Esperança (young) |
| Pedro Chagas | Domingos (young) |
| Luz Jiménez | |
| Zeca Camargo | Host of the festival |
