= Fiuk (singer) =

Brazilian actor and singer

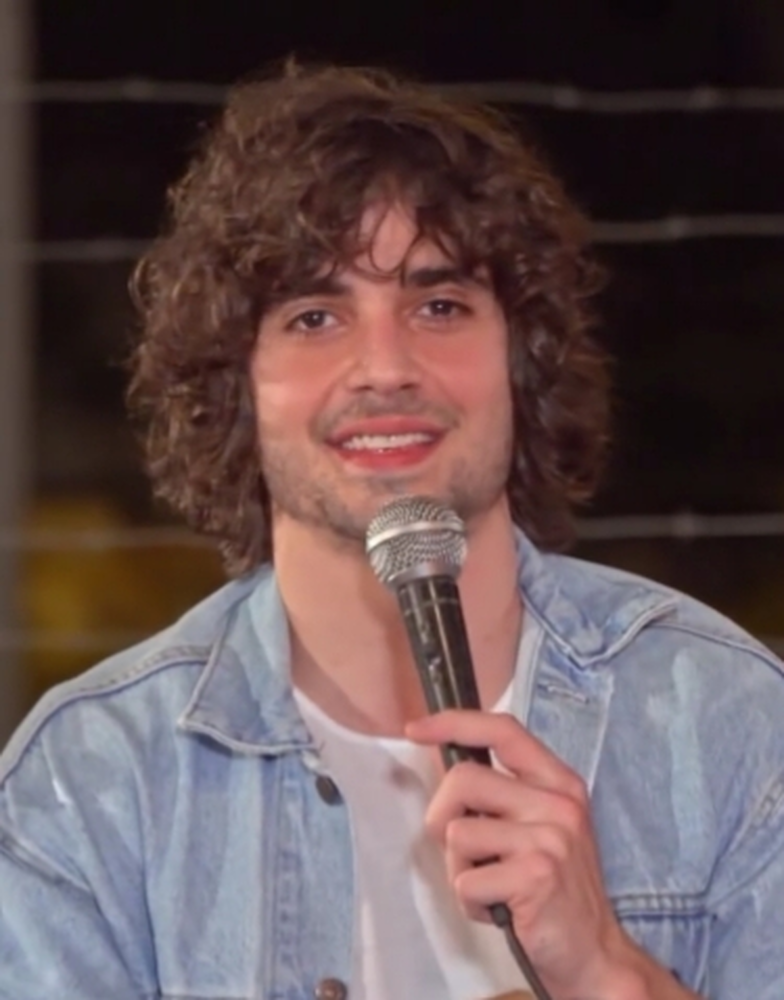
- Fiuk in 2020

Background information
- Born: Filipe Kartalian Ayrosa Galvão; October 25, 1990 (age 35)
- Origin: São Paulo, Brazil
- Genres: Pop rock
- Occupations: Singer-songwriter, musician, actor
- Instruments: Vocals, keyboards, guitar
- Years active: 2004–present
- Label: Warner Music Group

Filipe Kartalian Ayrosa Galvão, better known by his stage name Fiuk (born October 25, 1990) is a Brazilian singer-songwriter and actor of Armenian ancestry. He is better known for his role as Bernardo Oliveira in the seventeenth season of the telenovela Malhação. He started career as a member of the band No Name and later as the lead singer of the band Hori, before starting a solo career. Fiuk was born in São Paulo, Brazil, and is a son of the fellow musician Fábio Júnior and the businesswoman Cristina Kartalian. He has four siblings: half-sister Cléo Pires (daughter of Glória Pires), Krízia, Tainá and Záion. Besides his acting and musical career, Fiuk is also a drifting pilot. He declared the intention to compete in Japan.

== Career ==
With the band Hori, he recorded the independent EP Mentes Inquietas, with five tracks. The group lasted until early 2008, with the leaving of Cleiton Galvão. Through Mi Vieira (lead singer of Glória), Fiuk met Max Klein, who had played in Glória and other independent bands, such as Enjoy, besides being a composer and music producer. At the time, the band was changing, and Fiuk decided to invite Max for an audition to know him better. Max had just lost his father, was tense and made some technical mistakes, but still impressed Fiuk, the leader of the band. With the departure of Cleiton, Max was later made a solo guitarist.

Two months later, the band signed to Warner Music Brazil. During the preproduction of the album, the rhythm guitarist Alex left the band and was replaced by Renan Augusto. Even without a bassist, the band began composing tracks that would form the first official album.

Fiuk auditioned to be cast in the seventeenth season of the telenovela Malhação, following in the footsteps of his father. Fiuk was accepted to portray the character Bernardo Oliveira, protagonist of the season with Cristiana Araújo (played by Cristiana Peres). The song Quem eu sou of the band Hori was chosen as the opening theme of the season.

In January 2021, it was announced he is a contestant in the reality show Big Brother Brasil 21. His sarcastic behavior towards his housemates has garnered a very negative reception from the viewers alike. However, he managed to reach the third place in the competition, receiving 4,62% of the public vote.

== Filmography ==
Television

Year	Title	Role	Notes
2009 - 2010	Malhação ID	Bernardo Oliveira	Season 17
2010	Tal Filho, Tal Pai	Fiuk	
2011	Aquele Beijo	Agenor Barbosa	
2012	Guerra dos Sexos	Daniel Ramirez	
2012	Louco por Elas		
2013	Coletivation	Host of MTV Brasil	
2014	Now Generation	Alex	
2017	A Força do Querer	Ruy Garcia	
2021	Big Brother Brasil 21	Himself / Housemate	Third place

Films

- 2010 – As Melhores Coisas do Mundo
- 2014 – Julio Sumiu
- 2016 – Sing

== Discography ==
Solo

- Sou Eu (2011)
- Vira-Lata (2013)

with Hori

- Hori (2009)
