= Alejandro Claveaux =

Brazilian actor (born 1983)

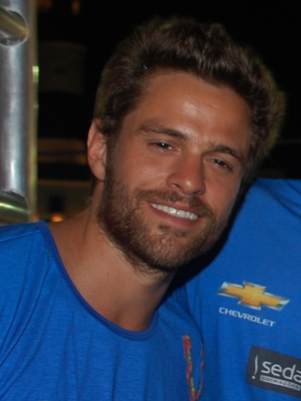
- Claveaux in February 2012
- Born: Alejandro Claveaux Martinez; 1 March 1983 (age 42); Goiânia, Goiás, Brazil
- Occupation: Actor
- Years active: 2007–present

Alejandro Claveaux Martinez (born 1 March 1983) is a Brazilian actor.

== Biography ==
Claveaux was born in Goiânia, the son of Uruguayan parents of French and Spanish origin. He graduated in food engineering and came to work in the profession for about three years, but he decided to pursue his acting career after taking a course in performing arts at the college, which made him move to Rio de Janeiro.

In August 2022, he revealed that he was in a relationship but did not share the name of his boyfriend, who does not work in the artistic world, for privacy reasons.

== Career ==
In 2007, he began his career in the telenovela Luz do Sol, and he also made a special guest appearance in Mandrake the same year. In 2010 he gained prominence in the series Clandestinos: The Dream Began, in which he played the former model Alejandro, since the characters in the series had the same name of the actors. In 2011, he played a part in Insensato Coração as Paulo, the boyfriend of a homosexual singer. In the same year, he enters the cast of the nineteenth season of the youth series Malhação, where he plays Moisés. Between 2012 and 2013 he made appearances in Rede Globo series, until in 2014 he joined the cast of the crime series O Caçador, where he played a delegate in conflict with his brother, as they were both disputing the same woman. After the end of O Caçador, he made a participation in the first chapters of Império as Josué in the young phase. In 2014, he was cast to play the comic villain César in Alto Astral.

== Filmography ==
=== Television ===
| Year | Title | Role | Notes |
|---|---|---|---|
| 2007 | Luz do Sol | Guto | Episodes: "27–28 September 2007" |
| 2007 | Mandrake | Rodrigo | Episode: "Alma" |
| 2010 | Clandestinos: o Sonho Começou | Alejandro | |
| 2010 | Open Bar | Heitor | Season 1 |
| 2011 | Insensato Coração | Paulo | Episode: "26 February 2011" |
| 2011–12 | Malhação Conectados | Moisés Coelho | Season 19 |
| 2012 | Como Aproveitar o Fim do Mundo | Leandro | Episode: "Acertando as Contas" |
| 2013 | Louco por Elas | Javier | Episode: "Theodora se Apaixona" |
| 2013 | O Dentista Mascarado | Maxuel | Episode: "13 June 2013" |
| 2013 | Pé na Cova | Pablo | Episode: "À Deriva" |
| 2013 | Sangue Bom | Manolo | Episode: "21–23 de outubro de 2013" |
| 2014 | O Caçador | Alexandre Câmara | |
| 2014 | Império | Young Josué | Episode: "21 July 2014" |
| 2014–15 | Alto Astral | César Santana | |
| 2015 | Não Se Apega, Não | Boy on the beach | Episode: "8 November 2015" |
| 2016 | Chapa Quente | Fred | Episode: "7 July 2016" |
| 2016 | De Perto Ninguém é Normal | Nando | |
| 2016 | Nada Será Como Antes | Rodolfo do Vale | |
| 2017 | A Força do Querer | Vitor | Episode: "13–24 April 2017" |
| 2017 | Segredos de Justiça | Pedro | Episode: "Quem Cuida Dele?" |
| 2017–19 | A Vida Secreta dos Casais | Vicente | |
| 2017 | O Outro Lado do Paraíso | Nicolau | |
| 2018 | Pais de Primeira | Driguêra | |
| 2019 | Amor de Mãe | Tales | |
| 2020 | Coisa Mais Linda | Wagner Pessanha | Season 2 |
| 2022 | Cara e Coragem | Samuel Rezende Silva | Episodes 31 May – 28 June |
| 2022 | Maldivas | Captain Rafael | |
| 2022–present | Rensga Hits! | Deivid Cafajeste | |
| 2024 | No Rancho Fundo | Jordão Nicácio | |

=== Film ===
| Year | Title | Role | Notes |
|---|---|---|---|
| 2005 | Esse Menino É Meu Avô | | |
| 2013 | Cartas de Amor São Ridículas | Cassiano | |
| 2013 | Muitos Homens Num Só | Geraldo | |
| 2013 | Meu Passado Me Condena | Beto Assunção | |
| 2014 | O Táxi de Escher | Carlos | |
| 2014 | Os Homens São de Marte... E É Pra Lá que Eu Vou | Lourencinho | |

== Stage ==
| Year | Play | Role |
|---|---|---|
| 2016 | Gota D’Água [a seco] | Jasão |
