= Telenovela (TV channel) =

South Korean television channel

TeleNovela
- Country: South Korea
- Broadcast area: Nationwide
- Affiliates: TV Globo International
- Headquarters: Seoul, South Korea

Programming
- Picture format: 1080i (HDTV); 480i (SDTV until 2019)

Ownership
- Owner: EPG

History
- Launched: Early 2010s

Links
- Website: telenovela.co.kr

Telenovela (Korean: 텔레노벨라; RR: tellenobella), also stylized TeleNovela, is South Korean cable and satellite specialty channel.

The network transmits in SD (Standard-definition) until 2019 and in HD (High-definition) with approximately 7 million subscribers by December 2010.

The channel was announced by EPG on April 7, 2009, being the first channel specialized in Latin American productions in Korea. It also announced an exclusive output deal with TV Globo to provide its catalog.

Both channels' programming includes scripted television series (Brazilian telenovelas produced by TV Globo), miniseries, films, documentaries, specials and other programs. All are subtitles in Korean to adapt to the local culture.

== See also ==
- Media of South Korea
- Telecommunications in South Korea
