= The Best Things in the World =

2010 film directed by Laís Bodanzky

- Theatrical release poster
- Directed by: Laís Bodanzky
- Written by: Luiz Bolognesi
- Based on: Mano by Gilberto Dimenstein and Heloísa Prieto
- Produced by: Laís Bodanzky; Luiz Bolognesi
- Starring: Francisco Miguez; Gabriela Rocha; Caio Blat; Denise Fraga; Fiuk
- Cinematography: Mauro Pinheiro Jr.
- Edited by: Daniel Rezende
- Music by: Eduardo Bid
- Production company: Gullane Filmes
- Distributed by: Warner Bros. Pictures; Riofilme
- Release date: 16 April 2010
- Running time: 105 minutes
- Country: Brazil
- Language: Portuguese
- Budget: R$6 million
- Box office: R$2,257,084

The Best Things In The World (Portuguese: As Melhores Coisas do Mundo) is a 2010 Brazilian coming-of-age drama film based on the book series Mano, by Gilberto Dimenstein and Heloísa Prieto. It was directed, written and co-produced by Laís Bodanzky, and stars Francisco Miguez, Gabriela Rocha, Caio Blat, Denise Fraga, and Fiuk.

== Plot ==
The film is set in a middle-class school in São Paulo, and tells the one-month period in the life of Hermano, "Mano". Mano and his brother Pedro lead fun-loving lives until they learn their parents are getting a divorce. The anguish of their parents’ separation becomes more difficult when they discover their father is gay. Deeply affected by the changes at home, Mano must also deal with the challenge of being popular at school, having sex for the first time, the discovery of love and a snooping classmate's destructive gossip blog. The arrival of adulthood brings with it overwhelming difficulties and a major transformation in the way Mano sees the world.

== Cast ==
- Francisco Miguez as Mano
- Gabriela Rocha as Carol
- Caio Blat as Artur
- Paulo Vilhena as Marcelo
- Fiuk as Pedro
- Gustavo Machado as Gustavo
- Zécarlos Machado as Horácio
- Maria Eugênia Cortez as Bruna
- Denise Fraga as Camila
- Anna Sophia Gryschek as Valéria
