= Heloísa Prieto =

Heloisa Braz de Oliveira Prieto
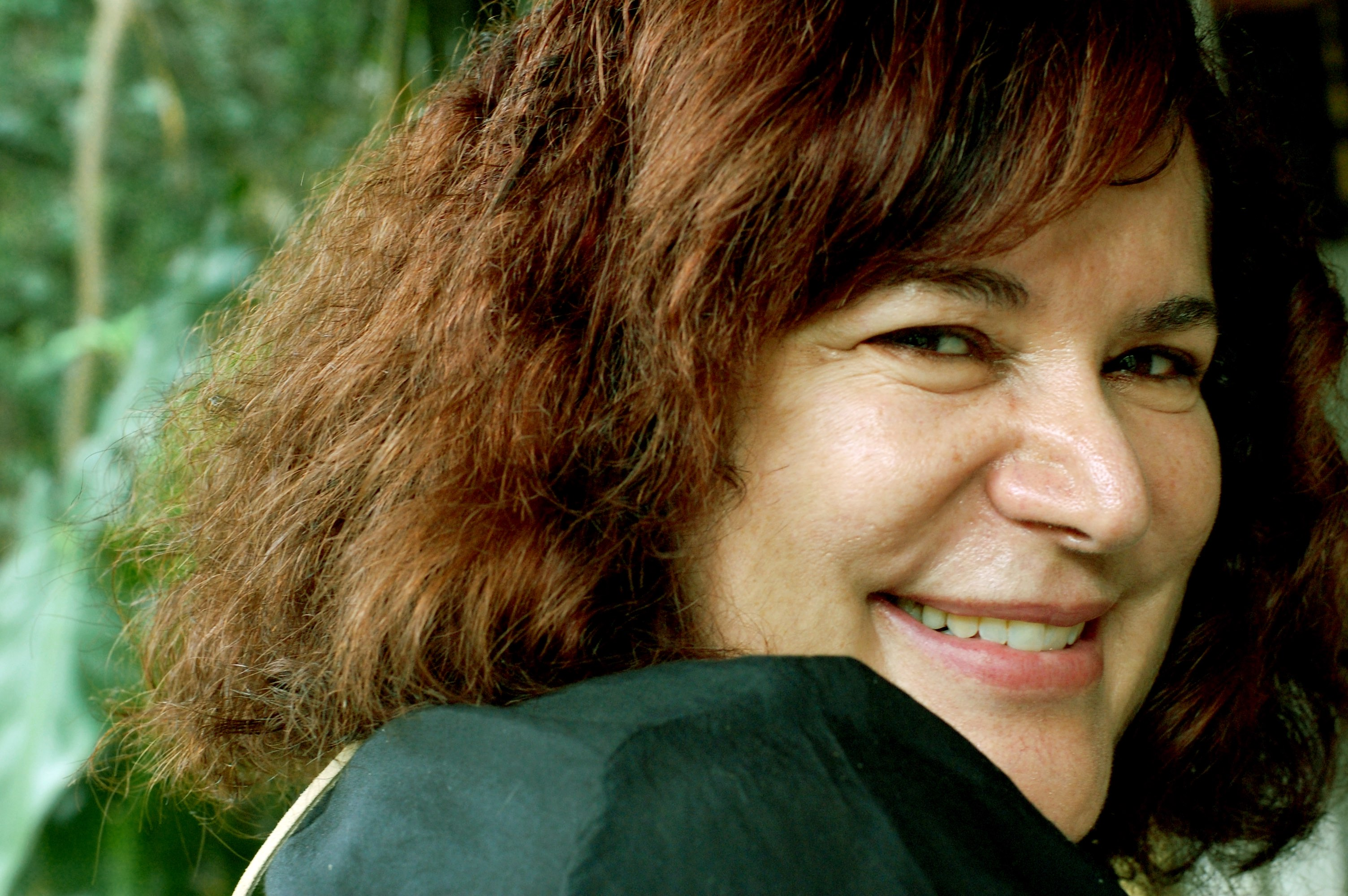
- Heloisa Prieto (photo by Priscila Nemeth)
- Born: August 26, 1954; São Paulo, Brazil
- Occupation: Writer and translator

Heloisa Braz de Oliveira Prieto (born August 26, 1954) is a Brazilian writer, cultural researcher and translator with a master's degree in communication and semiotics, and a PhD in Literary Theory.

== Biography ==
Heloisa began her writing career when she was a still a young kindergarten teacher at the Escola da Vila, in São Paulo.

Her published work, of 94 books in both short story and novel form, embraces fairy tales, fantasy fiction and the retelling of indigenous myths and legends. She is best known as a writer of fiction for children and young adults.

In 2022, she penned her English young adult debut novel, The Musician prefaced by Estas Tonne.

Heloisa was awarded Best Children's Book for "A Princesa que Não Queria Aprender a Ler" (The Princess Who Didn't Want To Learn To Read), and Best Folklore Book for "Mata" by the Brazilian Writers’ Union. She was awarded Best Book Of Legends for her "O Livro dos Pássaros Mágicos" (The Book Of Magical Birds) by National Book Foundation which also selected her "Andarilhas" (Travelling Tales) in 2016 for their Bologna Catalogue of Books for Children and Young Readers, "A Cidade dos Deitados (The City of Dead), was one of the winners of Best Book for young adults by Brazilian Book Chamber (Câmara Brasileira do Livro), Her "Lá Vem Historia" (Here Comes A Story) has sold over 400,000 copies and became a TV series for children on TV Cultura.

Her series "Mano", co-written with journalist Gilberto Dimenstein, inspired the movie The Best Things in The World, (Warner Brothers - dir: Laís Bodanzky) which won Best Film for Children and Young People at the 2011 International Film Festival for Children and Young Adults (FICI), in Madrid, Spain.

Apart from her prolific published output she has also spent a lifetime researching myths and legends – both ancient and modern; organizing and curating collections of cross-cultural interest and has created and organized numerous creative writing workshops for children, teenagers and adults. She mentors many young talents and places particular emphasis on supporting and facilitating the artistic and literary aspirations of indigenous people.

== Works ==
Title	Publishing Company	Observations
The Musician	Koehler books	2022
As aventuras de um cão chamado Petit	Editora FTD	2022
No meio da multidão, como encontrar seu poema?	Editora Edelbra	co-author Victor Scatolin
A vitória de Mairarê	Bamboo Editorial	co-author Victor Scatolin
Andarilhas	SM Edições	
Ian, a música das esferas	Editora Rocco	
O Caso Dominó	Editora Edelbra	
O estranho Caso da Massinha fedorenta	Companhia das Letrinhas - Penguin	
O livro imperdível	Editora Ática	
a lenda do gato oculto	Editora Nova Fronteira	
As três faces da moeda	Editora Edelbra	
Contos musicais	Editora Leya	
O jogo dos tesouros	Editora Edelbra	
O livro da sorte	Editora Terceiro Nome	
Os sete arcos de íris	Editora Papirus	
Quer ouvir uma história	Bamboo Editorial	
Vó Coruja	Companhia das Letrinhas - Penguin	co-author Daniel Munduruku
12x12 Brasil x Alemanha	Editora Dsop	anthology
Divinas aventuras	Companhia das Letrinhas - Penguin	
Divinas desventuras	Companhia das Letrinhas - Penguin	
Divinas Travessuras	Companhia das Letrinhas - Penguin	co-author Marcos Martinho dos Santos
Escrita Secreta	selo Escrita Fina - Editora Zit	
Heróis e Guerreiras	Companhia das Letrinhas - Penguin	
Mano descobre a arte	Editora Ática	co-author Gilberto Dimenstein
Mano descobre a diferença	Editora Ática	co-author Gilberto Dimenstein
Mano descobre a ecologia	Editora Ática	co-author Gilberto Dimenstein
Mano descobre a liberdade	Editora Ática	co-author Gilberto Dimenstein
Mano descobre a solidariedade	Editora Ática	co-author Gilberto Dimenstein
Mano descobre a paz	Editora Ática	co-author Gilberto Dimenstein
Mano descobe a confiança	Editora Ática	co-author Gilberto Dimenstein
Mano descobre o amor	Editora Ática	co-author Gilberto Dimenstein
O Grande combate	Editora Moderna	
O imperador amarelo	Editora Moderna	
As estrelas se divertem	Editora Moderna	
Dragões negros	Editora Moderna	
O livro dos medos	Companhia das Letrinhas - Penguin	anthology
Hoje é dia de festa	Companhia das Letrinhas - Penguin	anthology
Vice-versa ao contrário	Companhia das Letrinhas - Penguin	anthology
A língua do contrário	Editora Ática	
O super herói e a fralda	Editora Ática	
A dona da bola e a dona da história	Editora Ática	
Horror, humor e quadrinhos	Editora Ática	
Esconderijo	Companhia das Letrinhas - Penguin	
Lobo de estimação	Editora Projeto	
Magos, fadas e bruxas	Companhia das Letrinhas - Penguin	
Rotas fantásticas	Editora FTD	
Monstros e mundos misteriosos	Companhia das Letrinhas - Penguin	
Mil e um fantasmas	Companhia das Letrinhas - Penguin	
A princesa que não queria aprender a ler	Editora FTD	
32 casos de amor	Editora FTD	
A loira do banheiro	Editora Ática	
Lenora	Editora Rocco	
A cidade dos deitados	Editora Cosac Naify	
De todos os cantos do mundo	Companhia das Letrinhas - Penguin	co-author Magda Pucci
Gnomos e Duendes	Companhia das Letrinhas - Penguin	
Mata	Companhia das Letrinhas - Penguin	
Terra	Companhia das Letrinhas - Penguin	
Papai Noel, um velhinho de muitos nomes	Companhia das Letrinhas - Penguin	anthology
A tábua de esmeraldas	Editora Moderna	
A guerra dos gatos contra a bruxa da rua	Editora Ática	
A panela da paz	Editora Ática	
A vida é um palco	SM Edições	
O jogo da parlenda	Companhia das Letrinhas - Penguin	
Vida crônica	Companhia das Letrinhas - Penguin	anthology
De primeira viagem	Companhia das Letras - Penguin	anthology
Lá vem história	Companhia das Letrinhas - Penguin	
Lá vem história outra vez	Companhia das Letrinhas - Penguin	
Anita garibaldi - a estrela da tempestade	Editora Rocco	
O cachorro que sabia dar risadas	Editora Ática	
A vida é um palco	SM Edições	
Memórias de um corsário	SM Edições	
Fadinha	Bamboo Editorial	
A fonte do esquecimento	Editora Edelbra	
Grace O'Malley - a Pirata Invencível	SM Edições	co-author Victor Scatolin
Una e o Leão	Editora Sesi	(Edmund spenser -Original work) co-author Victor Scatolin.
Balada	Editora Brinquebook	
