= Laís Bodanzky =

Brazilian film director

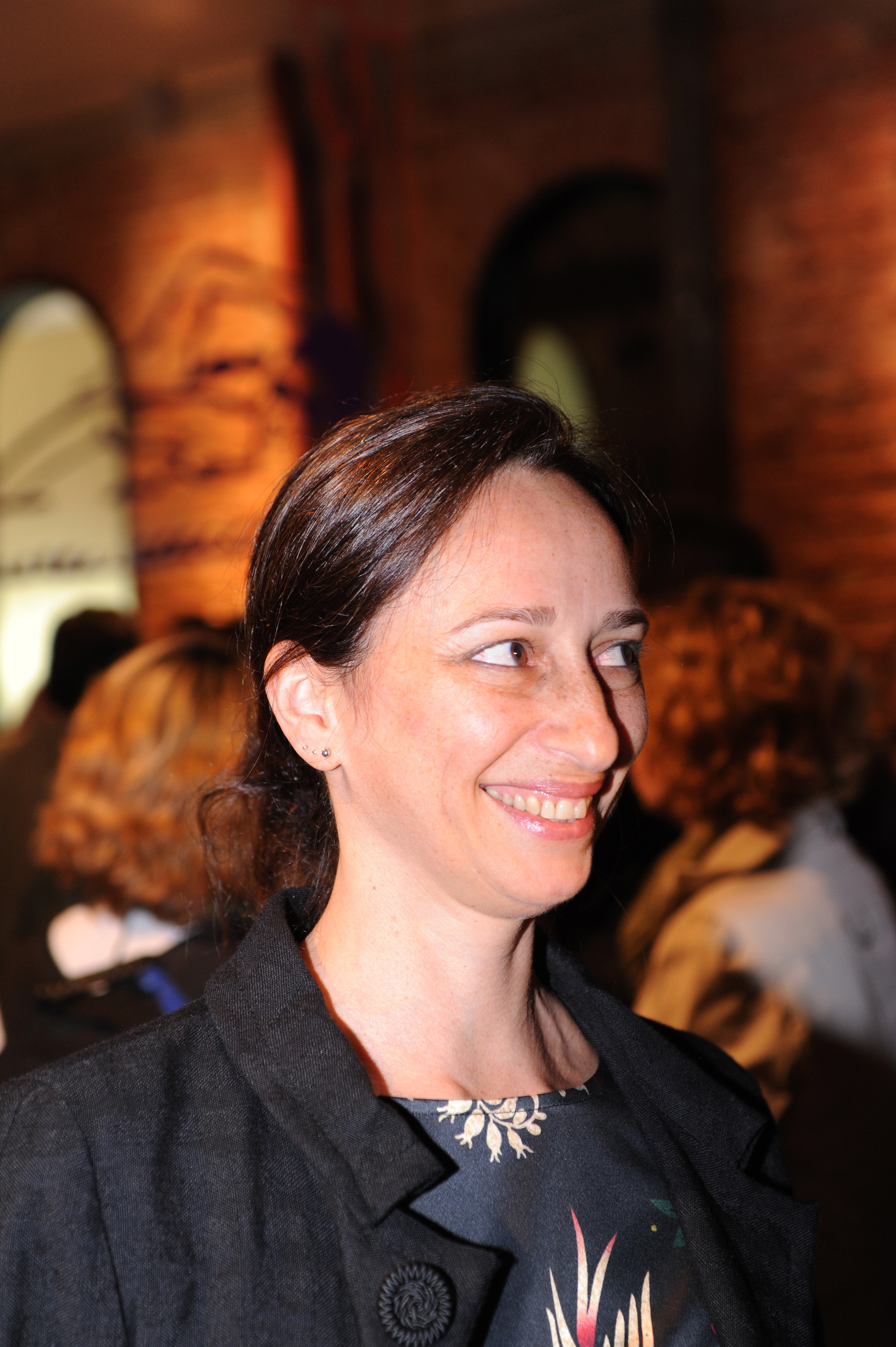
- Born: 23 September 1969 (age 56); São Paulo, Brazil
- Occupation: Film director

Laís Bodanzky (born 23 September 1969) is a Brazilian film director, producer and screenwriter. She is best known for Brainstorm, a film about the situation in mental institutions in Brazil.

Over 15 years, she has coordinated the educational Tela Brasil social projects, showing movies in low-income areas of Brazil, fostering the Brazilian film industry and bringing over one million people to movie theaters, most for the first time in their lives.

== Biography ==
The daughter of fellow filmmaker Jorge Bodanzky, and of Ashkenazi-Austrian descent, Laís studied acting under Antunes Filho before transitioning to film direction. She made her directorial debut with the short film Cartão Vermelho (Red Card), which centers on a girl living among boys who begins to discover her sexuality. This award-winning short was selected for the 1995 New York Film Festival.

She achieved widespread cinematic recognition with the feature film Bicho de Sete Cabeças (2001), a joint production between Brazil (Buriti Filmes, Dezenove, and Gullane) and Italy (Fábrica Cinema - Marco Müller). The film won numerous awards and introduced actor Rodrigo Santoro to international audiences.

Her fourth feature, Just Like Our Parents (Como Nossos Pais), premiered at the 67th Berlin International Film Festival (Panorama Special) in 2017. Surrounded by feminist discourse and nominated for the Teddy Award, it received critical acclaim from international media and became the most awarded Brazilian film of that year.

Bodanzky's acclaimed filmography also includes Chega de Saudade (2007), a co-production with the French channel Arte, and The Best Things in the World (2010), which debuted at the Rome Film Festival. Additionally, she has directed documentaries for film and television, such as Cine mambembe, o cinema descobre o Brasil and Mulheres olímpicas for ESPN.

She is a partner of filmmaker Luiz Bolognesi at the production company Buriti Filmes. She served as a producer for his features Rio 2096: A Story of Love and Fury (which won the Crystal Award for Best Feature at Annecy 2013) and Ex-Shaman (Special Jury Prize at Berlin/Panorama 2018).

For 15 years, she coordinated the 'Tela Brasil' social projects, which focused on teaching and screening films in the peripheries of Brazil. This initiative helped foster the national film industry and brought over one million people to the cinema, many for the first time.

In February 2019, Bodanzky was announced as the new president of Spcine, the municipal agency for the promotion of audiovisual content in São Paulo.

== Filmography ==
Key
†	Indicates a documentary	‡	Indicates a short film

List of films directed by Laís Bodanzky
Year	Original title	English release title	Language(s)	Notes
1994	Cartão Vermelho ^{‡}		Portuguese	
1999	Cine Mambembe: O Cinema Descobre o Brasil ^{†}		Portuguese	Co-directed with Luiz Bolognesi.
2000	Bicho de Sete Cabeças	Brainstorm	Portuguese	
2002	A Guerra dos Paulistas ^{†}		Portuguese	Co-directed with Luiz Bolognesi. TV documentary.
2007	Chega de Saudade	The Ballroom	Portuguese	
2010	As Melhores Coisas do Mundo	The Best Things in the World	Portuguese	
2012	O Ser Transparente ^{‡}		Portuguese	Segment of Mundo Invisível (2012).
2012	Uma Nota Só ^{‡}		Portuguese	
2013	Mulheres Olímpicas ^{†}		Portuguese	TV documentary.
2014	Educação.doc ^{†}		Portuguese	TV documentary miniseries. 5 episodes.
2014	Psi		Portuguese	TV series. 2 episodes.
2017	Como Nossos Pais	Just Like Our Parents	Portuguese	
2021	A Viagem de Pedro		Portuguese	
