= Stressed Out (disambiguation) =

"Stressed Out" is a 2015 song by Twenty One Pilots.

Stressed Out may also refer to:

== Music ==
- "Stressed Out" (A Tribe Called Quest song), 1996
- "Stressed Out", a 1995 song by Merrill Nisker from Fancypants Hoodlum
- "Stressed Out", a 2001 song by Babyface from Face2Face
- "Stressed Out", a 2007 song by Anna Abreu from Anna Abreu

== TV ==
- "Stressed Out", a 1990 episode of Degrassi High
- "Stressed Out", a 2010 episode of Launch My Line

== See also ==
- Psychological stress
