= Ru Hollywood Stories =

- RuPaul's Drag Race episode
- Episode no.: Season 7 Episode 6
- Directed by: Nick Murray
- Presented by: RuPaul

Guest appearances
- Merle Ginsberg; Ariana Grande

Episode chronology
← Previous "The DESPY Awards"	Next → "Snatch Game"

"Ru Hollywood Stories" is the sixth episode of the seventh season of the American television series RuPaul's Drag Race. It originally aired on April 6, 2015. The episode's main challenge tasks the contestants with acting in sketches about Merle Ginsberg from the perspectives of Ginsberg, RuPaul, and Michelle Visage. Ginsberg and Ariana Grande are guest judges. Katya wins the main challenge. Kandy Ho is eliminated from the competition after placing in the bottom and losing a lip-sync contest against Jaidynn Diore Fierce to "Break Free" by Grande featuring Zedd.

== Episode ==
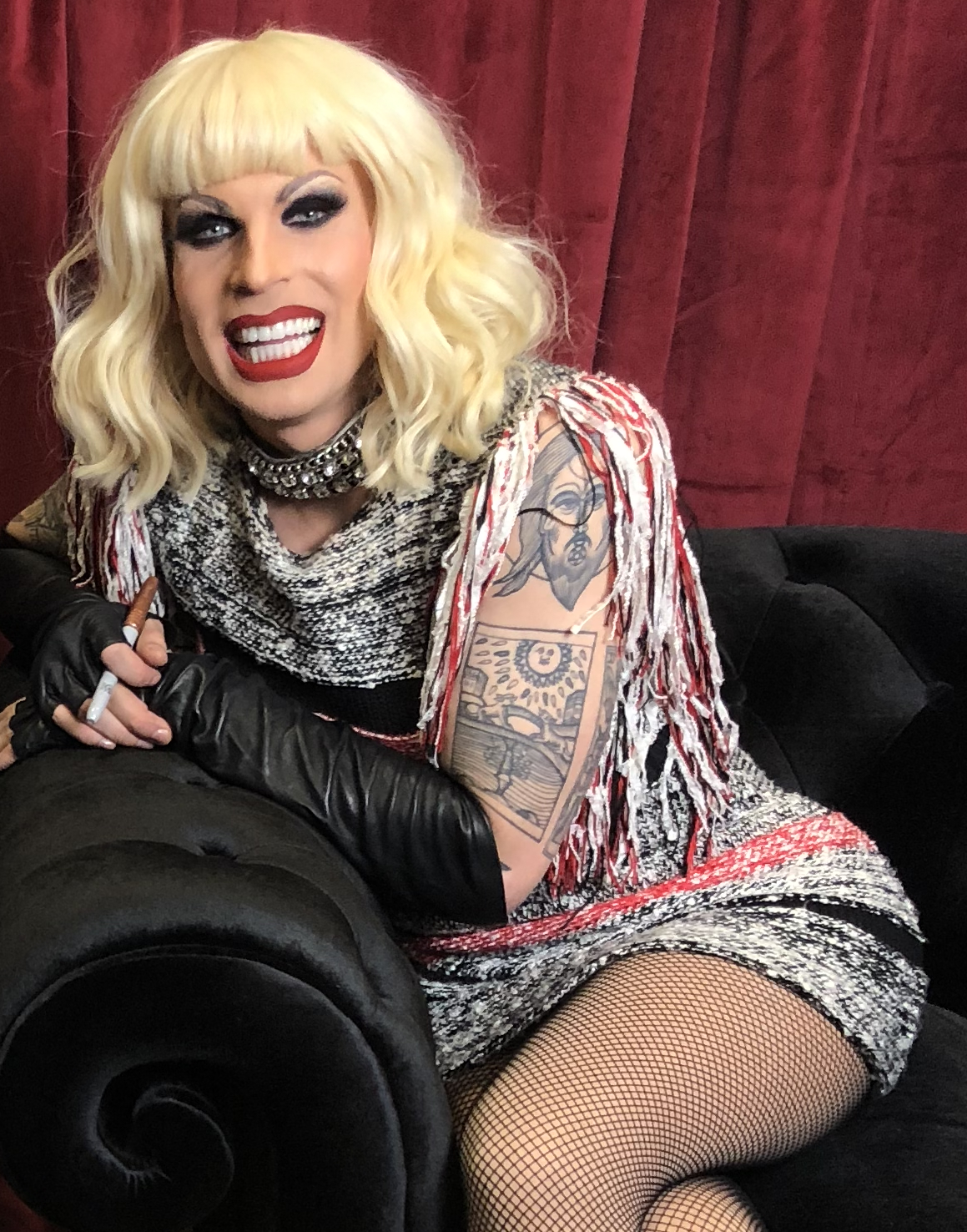
Katya (pictured at RuPaul's DragCon NYC in 2018) wins the episode's main challenge.

The contestants return to the workroom after Mrs. Kasha Davis's elimination on the previous episode. On a new day, RuPaul greets the group and reveals the mini-challenge, which tasks the contestants with working to gain points by selecting Pit Crew members while avoiding the one with a "monster" in his pants. Ginger Minj wins the mini-challenge. RuPaul reveals the main challenge, which tasks the contestants with acting in "Whatever Happened to Merle Ginsberg" sketches of Ru Hollywood Stores, from the perspectives of Merle Ginsberg, Michelle Visage, and RuPaul. As the winner of the mini-challenge, Ginger Minj assigns the following groups:

- Team Merle Ginsberg: Ginger Minj, Katya, and Kennedy Davenport
- Team Michelle Visage: Kandy Ho, Max, and Violet Chachki
- Team RuPaul: Jaidynn Diore Fierce, Miss Fame, and Pearl

The groups start to rehearse in the workroom. RuPaul returns to let the contestants know they are filming with guest director Ross Mathews and the runway category for the fashion show is "Death Becomes Her". The groups film with Mathews. On elimination day, the contestants make final preparations in the workroom for the fashion show. The contestants talk about their relationships with their families. Jaidynn Diore Fierce shares that she is not fully open with her family about her sexuality.

On the main stage, RuPaul welcomes fellow judges Visage and Mathews, as well as guest judges Ginsberg and Ariana Grande. RuPaul shares the assignment and runway category, then the fashion show commences. After the contestants present their looks, the judges and contestants watch the sketches. The judges deliver their critiques, deliberate, then share the results with the group. Team Merle Ginsberg is the winning team, and Katya wins the challenge. Team Michelle Visage and Team RuPaul are the losing teams. Jaidynn Diore Fierce, Kandy Ho and Miss Fame receive negative critiques, and Miss Fame is deemed safe. Jaidynn Diore Fierce and Kandy Ho place in the bottom and face off in a lip-sync contest to "Break Free" (2014) by Grande featuring Zedd. Jaidynn Diore Fierce wins the lip-sync and Kandy Ho is eliminated from the competition.

== Production and broadcast ==
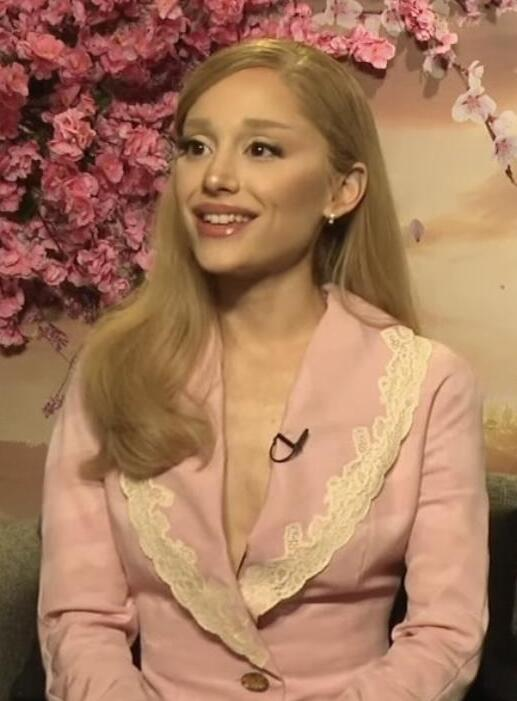
Ariana Grande (pictured in 2024) is a guest judge.

The episode was directed by Nick Murray and originally aired on April 6, 2015.

=== Fashion ===
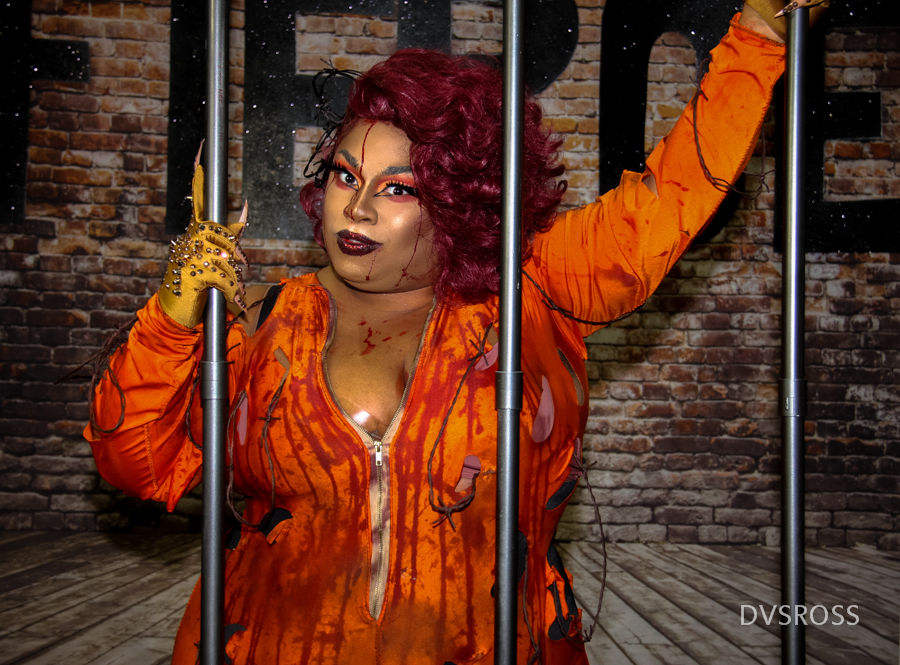
Jaidynn Diore Fierce (pictured at RuPaul's DragCon LA in 2018, wearing an orange jumpsuit similar to one worn on the episode) wins the lip-sync contest.

Katya has a blonde wig and a stuffed shark around her leg. Ginger Minj has a brown jacket resembling a bear. Kennedy Davenport wears tall black boots and a mohawk. Max has a white gown and white gloves. She gives the illusion of carrying her own heart in a small box. Kandy Ho's outfit is black and she has fangs. Miss Fame's look gives the illusion of a knife going through her head. Pearl wears lingerie, a neck brace, and a blonde wig. Jaidynn Diore Fierce has an orange jumpsuit. Violet Chachki has a corset and an oxygen mask connect to an oxygen tank. Grazia said she "cinched in her waist in a seriously hot lingerie number paired with an oxygen mask, making guest judge Ariana Grande gasp in awe. And damn, she made it look so easy".

== Reception ==
Oliver Sava of The A.V. Club gave the episode a rating of 'B'.

Justin Curto of Vulture said Grande was "absolutely living" for the lip-sync contest. Sam Brooks ranked "Break Free" number 143 in The Spinoff's 2019 "definitive ranking" of the show's 162 lip-syncs to date. Stephen Daw ranked the "Break Free" performance fourth in Billboard's 2021 list of the show's lip-syncs to songs by Grande. Daw wrote, "Maybe it's because Ms. Grande herself was on the judges' panel, but Jaidynn Diore Fierce and Kandy Ho were not messing around in their 'Break Free' lip sync. From start to finish, both of the season 7 queens danced, dropped, splitted and shook their padded butts off in order to not only stay in the competition, but impress Ariana." When "Break Free" was used in a lip-sync on the ninth season of RuPaul's Drag Race All Stars, Kevin O'Keeffe of Xtra Magazine opined, "while Roxxxy and Shannel do well, Jaidynn Diore Fierce and Kandy Ho both tore up 'Break Free' back in the day in front of Ariana Grande herself. It’s hard to outdo the memory of that."

== See also ==
- Ariana Grande discography
- Zedd discography
