= Chega de Saudade (disambiguation) =

"Chega de Saudade" is a 1958 Bossa Nova song by João Gilberto.

Chega de Saudade may also refer to:

- Chega de Saudade (album), a 1959 album by João Gilberto
- Chega de Saudade (film), a 2007 Brazilian film
