= Save Ralph =

2021 animated short film by Spencer Susser

- Promotional release poster
- Directed by: Spencer Susser
- Written by: Spencer Susser
- Produced by: Spencer Susser; Jeff Vespa; Lisa Arianna; Alldayeveryday
- Starring: Taika Waititi; Ricky Gervais; Zac Efron; Olivia Munn; Pom Klementieff; Tricia Helfer
- Cinematography: Tristan Oliver
- Edited by: Spencer Susser
- Animation by: Tobias Fouracre
- Production companies: Humane Society International; Arch Model Studio; Blue-Tongue Films; Alldayeveryday Productions; Vespa Pictures
- Distributed by: Humane Society International
- Release date: April 6, 2021
- Running time: 4 minutes
- Countries: Australia; United Kingdom; United States
- Language: English

Save Ralph is a 2021 stop motion animated mockumentary short film written and directed by Spencer Susser. It stars Taika Waititi, Ricky Gervais, Zac Efron, Olivia Munn, Pom Klementieff, Tricia Helfer, and Rodrigo Santoro. The plot follows an interview with Ralph (Waititi), a rabbit who details his life as he is used for animal testing and the damages it has caused to his body. Produced by Jeff Vespa, the 4-minute short film was released by Humane Society International on April 6, 2021, to critical acclaim. It is an international co-production of Australia, United States and United Kingdom.

== Plot ==
Ralph is a rabbit. Speaking with Humane Society International for a documentary, he talks about his life as a "tester" for cosmetic products. Ralph tells the production crew how he is blind in one eye, partially deaf and has chemical burns on his back that are still tender and sting if he breathes or moves a certain way. While preparing for work, Ralph explains with a sad tone how he does not necessarily care about his life, as he feels sacrificing his body to help humans is worth it. At a laboratory, Ralph's rabbit friends beg for the production crew to free them from their trials as Ralph is injected with an unknown chemical into his only working eye. Now completely blind and visibly in pain, Ralph says his final remarks; without animal testing, he would be out in a field "like a normal rabbit". As the video ends, Ralph gives a worried thumbs-up towards the camera, painfully claiming "It's all good".

== Voice cast ==
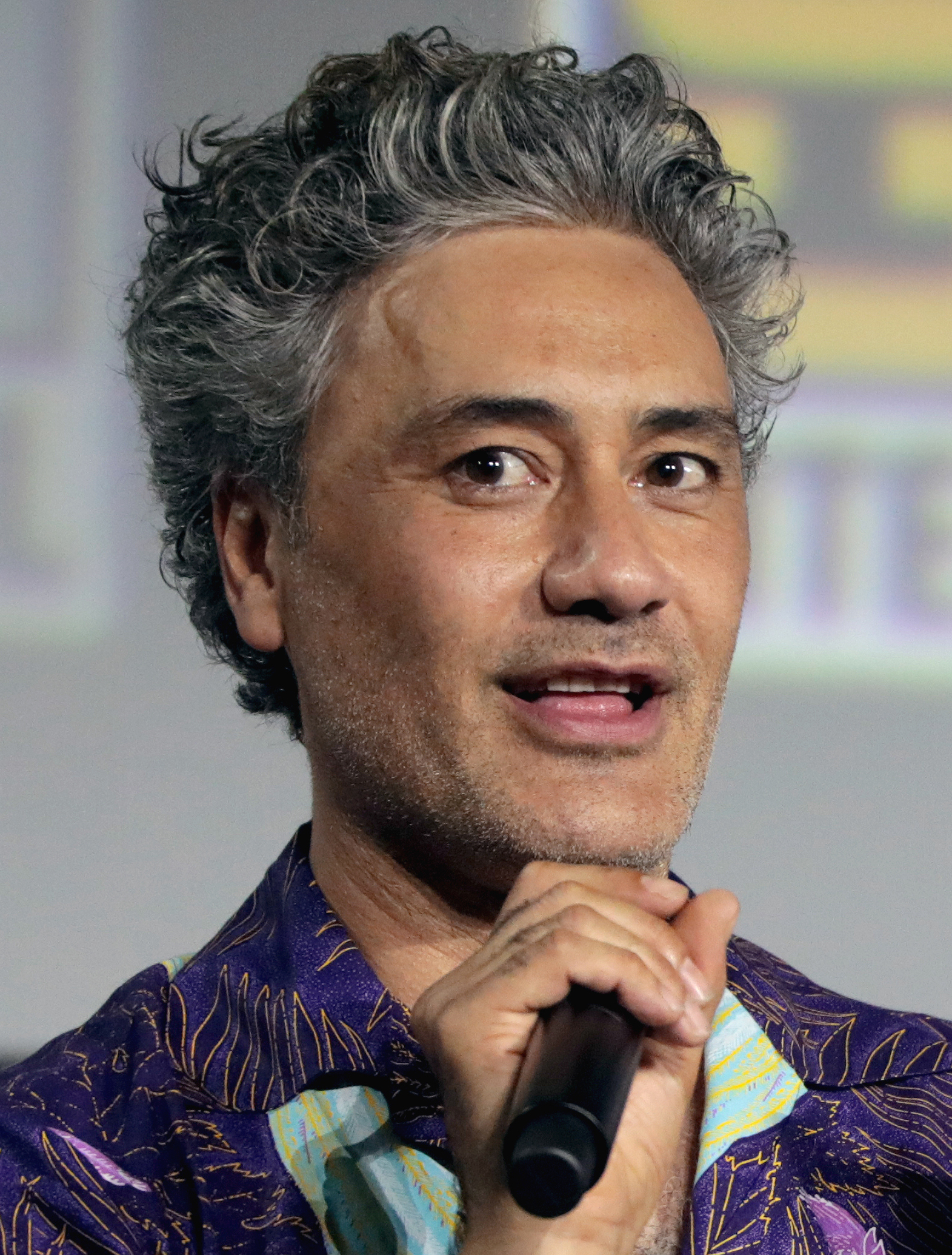
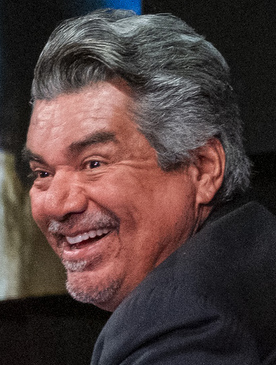
Taika Waititi and George Lopez voice Ralph in the English and Spanish dubs, respectively.
- Taika Waititi as Ralph, a rabbit
- Ricky Gervais as the interviewer
- Zac Efron as Bobby, a rabbit
- Olivia Munn as Marshmallow, a rabbit
- Pom Klementieff as Cinnamon, a rabbit
- Tricia Helfer as Cottonballs, a rabbit
- Rodrigo Santoro as a rabbit

In the Spanish and French dubs, George Lopez and Pom Klementieff lend their voices as Ralph respectively. Additionally, Santoro, Wilmer Valderrama, Denis Villeneuve, and Rosario Dawson also appear in the Portuguese, Spanish, French, and Vietnamese iterations.

== Production ==
The animated project Save Ralph was announced on March 24, 2021, "conceived as part of the #SaveRalph campaign", in an effort from Humane Society International to ban animal testing around the world. That same day, a teaser video for the short film was released, with actor Taika Waititi sharing the official promotional poster for the film and writing on Twitter that the project was "a cool thing that is coming soon. If you don't watch it and love it then you hate animals and we can't be friends anymore. #SaveRalph".

The models of each character were hand-made and created by puppet maker Andy Gent from Arch Model Studio based in United Kingdom, who said that the process of creating Ralph took over four months and covering him in fur took five weeks. On producing the short film, Jeff Vespa said he wanted to create a project where people would want to watch and learn about the dangers of animal testing, deciding an animated film would be the best approach. In casting an actor to portray Ralph, Spencer said the first person he contacted was Waititi, who quickly agreed to star. Filming for the short took place over 50 days, with each day accounting for the making of approximately four seconds of the film.

== Reception ==
Upon its release, Save Ralph was met with critical acclaim. From /Film, Ben Pearson praised the high level of detail in the short and compared the characters' designs to those in the 2009 film Fantastic Mr. Fox, writing that the film was "disturbing and heartbreaking and manipulative and powerful, all at the same time." Josh Weiss, writing for Syfy Wire, gave positive remarks to the voice acting and humor, stating that "Waititi once again proves that he is among the most prolific entertainers working today". For Animation Magazine, Mercedes Milligan complimented the story's main message and referred to the short itself as "powerful".

Save Ralph won the Grand Prix for Good award at the 69th Cannes Lions International Festival of Creativity in 2022. The award recognises creative work that benefits the world at large.
