= My Country (2011 film) =

2011 film directed by André Ristum

- Portuguese: Meu País
- Directed by: André Ristum
- Written by: André Ristum; Octavio Scopellitti; Marco Dutra
- Starring: Rodrigo Santoro; Cauã Reymond
- Cinematography: Hélcio Alemão Nagamine
- Edited by: Paulo Sacramento
- Music by: Patrick de Jongh
- Release date: October 7, 2011
- Country: Brazil
- Language: Portuguese

My Country (Portuguese: Meu País) is a 2011 Brazilian drama film co-written and directed by André Ristum and starring Rodrigo Santoro, Cauã Reymond, Débora Falabella, Anita Caprioli and Paulo José.

== Plot ==
Marcos is a successful and married businessman in Italy. After years out of Brazil, he is forced to return to his country when his father Armando dies from a stroke. On his return, he finds his brother Tiago, who is not intended for business. During the period of mourning, Marcos and Tiago have to live together by smoothing out their differences. To increase the conflict between the two brothers is the discovery of the existence of a half-sister who has mental problems, Manuela, a daughter that Armando has always kept hidden from the whole family.

== Cast ==
- Rodrigo Santoro as Marcos
- Cauã Reymond as Tiago
- Débora Falabella as Manuela
- Anita Caprioli as Giulia
- Paulo José as Armando
- Eduardo Semerjian as Dr. Osvaldo
- Luciano Chirolli as Moreira
- Nicola Siri as Giovanni
- Stephanie de Jongh as Joana
