= Jeff Vespa =

American photographer (born 1970)

- Born: 1970 (age 55–56)
- Education: American Film Institute
- Occupation: Photographer
- Website: jeffvespa.com

Jeff Vespa (born 1970) is an American photographer, known as a co-founder of WireImage and the editor-at-large of LIFE.com.

== Photography career ==
Vespa is most widely known for being one of nine co-founders of the photo agency website WireImage.com and its parent company MediaVast. He was also the original designer of WireImage's grid layout design. This design has now been adopted as the photo industry standard. In February 2007, MediaVast announced that it would sell to Getty Images for $207 million in an all-cash deal.

Starting in 2003, Vespa has been the official photographer of the Sundance Film Festival and the Toronto International Film Festival since 2006. In 2004, he joined forces with Paris Hilton to create a New York Times bestselling book, Confessions of an Heiress: A Tongue-in-Chic Peek Behind the Pose, which was followed the next year with Your Heiress Diary: Confess it All to Me.

Vespa was the editor-at-large of the LIFE.com from March 2009 to February 2012.

On October 2, 2012, Vespa launched Verge, a web magazine dedicated to discovering new talent.

Vespa's first coffee table book, The Art of Discovery, (Rizzoli) was released in October 2014. It is a book of 100 portraits of celebrities along with quotes about an important moment of discovery in their lives.

== Film career ==
Vespa attended the American Film Institute Graduate Program for Producing in 1993. He produced the Lifetime Television movie Rituals in 1998, which starred Isaiah Washington and Regina King. More recently he produced, wrote and directed the 10-minute short film "Nosebleed", starring David Arquette, which could be seen on IFC and Channel 3 in France. The film had its premiere at the South By Southwest Film Festival (SXSW) in March 2008 and then screened at the 2008 Cannes Film Festival as a part of the Semaine de la Critique section. In 2018 Vespa directed his first feature, Paris Song, starring Abbie Cornish and Sanjar Madi.

== Bibliography ==
- The Art of Discovery (2014) - Photographed by Jeff Vespa Rizzoli ISBN 978-0847844302
- Confessions of an Heiress: A Tongue-in-Chic Peek Behind the Pose (2004) - Paris Hilton and Merle Ginsberg, Photographs by Jeff Vespa Fireside ISBN 978-0-7432-6665-9
- Your Heiress Diary: Confess It All to Me (2005) - Paris Hilton and Merle Ginsberg, Photographs by Jeff Vespa Fireside ISBN 978-0-7432-8714-2
- Party Confidential (2006) - Lara Shriftman and Elizabeth Harrison, Photographs by Jeff Vespa Bullfinch ISBN 978-0-8212-5780-7

== Filmography ==
- Paris Song (2018) Director
- Madame Psychosis Holds A Seance, directed by Rosson Crow (2015) Producer
- Face In The Crowd, directed by Alex Prager (2013) Producer
- Sellebrity, directed by Kevin Mazur (2012) Producer
- La Petite Mort, directed by Alex Prager (2012) Producer
- Despair, directed by Alex Prager (2010) Producer
- Children of the Spider (2010) Producer, Writer and Director
- Nosebleed (2008) Producer, Writer and Director
- Rituals (1998) Producer
- Tendrils (1996) Producer

== Exhibits ==
- wünderarts Amherst, MA, 2008 - American Dream, Two Person Show
- Flinn Gallery Greenwich, CT, 2008 - Food...Glorious Food, Group Show
- Gallery at LoFi, LA, 2006 - Eat Me! Yummy New Photographs
- LAXART, LA, 2006 - One Shot: 100x100, Group Show
- Rush Arts Gallery, NY, 2006 - God Complex: Images Of Power, Group Show
- Traction 811, LA, 2004 - Hollywood Graffiti

== Sources ==
- https://www.hollywoodreporter.com/rambling-reporter/wireimage-founder-make-directorial-debut-920067
- https://www.hollywoodreporter.com/news/wireimage-founder-jeff-vespa-launches-753128
- https://www.hollywoodreporter.com/gallery/celebrity-photographer-jeff-vespa-debuts-741073/1-shailene-woodley
- https://www.rottentomatoes.com/m/cannes_film_festival_2008/news/1728420/
- http://www.photoinduced.com/archives/819
- http://weblogs.variety.com/thompsononhollywood/2007/09/wireimages-jeff.html?query=%22jeff+vespa%22
- http://www.simonsays.com/content/destination.cfm?tab=1&pid=501751
- http://www.imaginginfo.com/article/article.jsp?id=1314
- http://www.abouttheimage.com/2006/12/wireimage_delta_air_lines_operating_celebrity_portrait_studio_at_sundance_film_festival.html
- https://www.variety.com/article/VR1117955640.html?categoryid=2178&cs=1
- http://select.nytimes.com/gst/abstract.html?res=F30D10F9385B0C768CDDA80994DE404482
