= Leonardo Villar =

Brazilian actor (1923–2020)

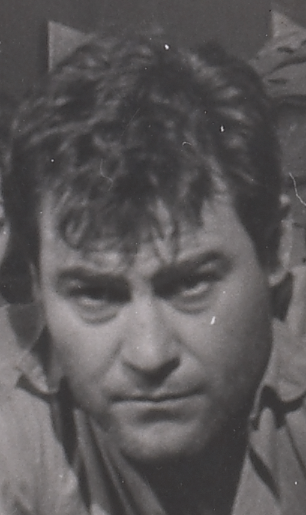
- Villar, c. 1962
- Born: Leonildo Motta; 25 July 1923; Piracicaba, São Paulo, Brazil
- Died: 3 July 2020 (aged 97); São Paulo, Brazil
- Occupation: Actor
- Years active: 1950–2011

Leonardo Villar (Brazilian Portuguese: [leoˈnaʁdu viˈlaʁ]; 25 July 1923 – 3 July 2020) was a Brazilian actor. He became internationally known for his performance as Zé do Burro in Anselmo Duarte's O Pagador de Promessas, the only Brazilian film so far awarded a Palme d'Or at the Cannes Film Festival.

== Personal life ==
Leonardo Villar was born as Leonildo Motta in Piracicaba, São Paulo, on 25 July 1923.

Villar died on 3 July 2020 at a hospital in São Paulo, of cardiac arrest, aged 96.

== Career ==
He started his career at the theater, but later also started acting in film and television.

Villar debuted at the theater on the 1950 play Os Pássaros. His first film role only came in 1962 as Zé do Burro in Anselmo Duarte's O Pagador de Promessas. He received international exposure for the role after the film won the Palme d'Or and became the first Brazilian and South American feature nominated for the Academy Award for Best Foreign Language Film. In 1965 he debuted on television in the TV Tupi telenovela A Cor de Sua Pele, which tells the story of an interracial relationship. In 1972, he moved to Rede Globo, where he starred in successful shows such as Escalada and Estúpido Cupido.

In 2001, after almost 20 years without acting in the theater, he starred in the play A Moratória. In 2007, after seven years without acting in a film, he starred in the critically acclaimed The Ballroom.

== Filmography ==
=== Film ===
- 1962: O Pagador de Promessas .... Zé do Burro / Donkey Jack
- 1964: Lampião, o Rei do Cangaço .... Lampião
- 1964: Procura-se uma Rosa
- 1965: Samba .... (uncredited)
- 1965: A Hora e a Vez de Augusto Matraga .... Augusto Matraga
- 1966: A Grande Cidade .... Jasão
- 1966: Amor e Desamor
- 1966: O Santo Milagroso
- 1967: Juego peligroso .... Homero Olmos / Homero de Tal (segment "HO")
- 1967: O Santo Milagroso .... Pastor Raimundo
- 1968: A Madona de Cedro
- 1982: Amor de Perversão
- 1996: Enigma de um Dia (Short)
- 1998: Ação entre Amigos .... Correia
- 2000: Brava Gente Brasileira
- 2007: The Ballroom

=== TV work ===
- 1965: A Cor da Sua Pele .... Dudu
- 1967: Os Miseráveis .... Jean Valjean
- 1969: Acorrentados .... Rodrigo
- 1972: O Primeiro Amor .... Luciano
- 1972: Uma Rosa com Amor .... Frazão
- 1973: O Duelo (TV Movie)
- 1973-1974: Os Ossos do Barão .... Miguel
- 1974: O Crime de Zé Bigorna (TV Movie) .... Miguel Fará
- 1975: Escalada .... Alberto Silveira
- 1975: O Grito .... Edgar
- 1976-1977: Estúpido Cupido .... Guima
- 1980: Coração Alado .... França
- 1981: O fiel e a pedra
- 1982: O Homem Proibido .... Dario
- 1983-1984: Voltei pra Você .... Rubens
- 1984: Marquesa de Santos .... José Bonifácio de Andrada e Silva
- 1984: Santa Marta Fabril S.A.
- 1985: Tudo em Cima .... Robert Kraus
- 1986-1987: Mania de Querer .... João
- 1990: Desejo .... Rodrigues
- 1990: Barriga de Aluguel .... seu Ezequiel Ribeiro
- 1991-1992: Amazônia .... Peçanha (Rede Manchete)
- 1995: Tocaia Grande .... coronel Elias Daltro
- 1997: O desafio de Elias .... Malaquias
- 1997: Os Ossos do Barão .... Antenor
- 1998: Serras Azuis .... Ignácio O'Neill
- 2000: Laços de Família .... Pascoal
- 2002: Coração de Estudante .... Ronaldo Rosa
- 2006-2007: Pé na Jaca .... tio José Fortuna
- 2010-2011: Passione .... Antero / Giovani (final appearance)

== Theater work ==
- 1950 - Os Pássaros
- 1951 - La Dame aux camélias
- 1951 - Six Characters in Search of an Author
- 1952 - Antigone
- 1952 - Vá com Deus
- 1953 - A Falecida
- 1953 - A Raposa e as Uvas
- 1953 - Canção Dentro do Pão
- 1954 - A Filha de Iório
- 1954 - Leonor de Mendonça
- 1955 - Maria Stuart
- 1955 - Os Filhos de Eduardo
- 1955 - Santa Marta Fabril S. A.
- 1955 - Volpone
- 1956 - Eurydice
- 1956 - Cat on a Hot Tin Roof
- 1956 - Divórcio para Três
- 1957 - A Rainha e os Rebeldes
- 1957 - Adorável Júlia
- 1957 - As Provas de Amor
- 1957 - Leonor de Mendonça
- 1958 - A Muito Curiosa História da Virtuosa Matrona de Éfeso
- 1958 - Panorama Visto da Ponte
- 1958 - Pedreira das Almas
- 1960 - O Pagador de Promessas
- 1960 - O Anjo de Pedra
- 1960 - Um Gosto de Mel
- 1960 - Um Panorama Visto da Ponte
- 1961 - A Semente
- 1962 - Death of a Salesman
- 1964 - Mary, Mary
- 1966 - O Sistema Fabrizzi
- 1966 - Rasto Atrás
- 1967 - Lua Minguante na Rua 14
- 1971 - Miss Julie
- 1972 - Um Panorama Visto da Ponte
- 1977 - A Mala
- 1978 - O Grande Amor de Nossas Vidas
- 1979 - Investigação na Classe Dominante
- 1980 - Campeões do Mundo
- 1982 - Motel Paradiso
- 2001 - A Moratória
