= Dean and Dan Caten =

Canadian fashion designer brothers (born 1964)

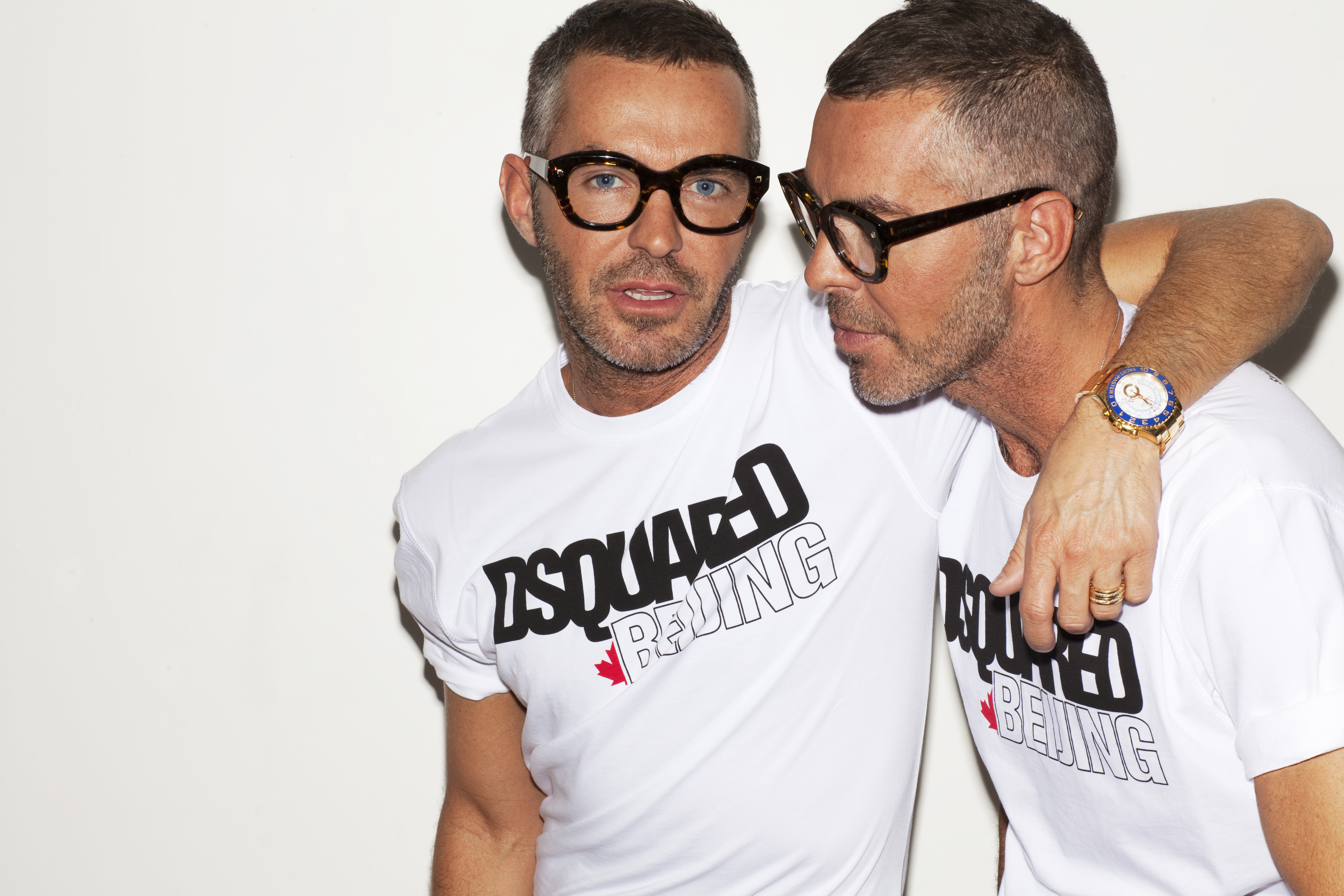
- Dean and Dan Caten
- Born: Dean and Dan Catenacci; December 19, 1964 (age 61); Toronto, Ontario, Canada
- Occupations: Founders, owners and creative directors of Dsquared²
- Label: Dsquared²
- Awards: "Breakthrough Design Team" by GQ USA "Men of the Year" – 2003; "Aguja de Oro" – 2006; "Best designers of the year" by GQ Spain "Man of the Year" – 2007; "Best designers of the year" by GQ Germany "Man of the Year" – 2009; A star on Canada's Walk of Fame - 2009
- Website: Dsquared² official website

Dean and Dan Caten (born Catenacci, December 19, 1964) are Canadian fashion designers, radio personalities, and businessmen. They are identical twin brothers and the founders and owners of Dsquared², an Italian luxury fashion house based in Milan.

== Early life ==
Dean and Dan Caten were born in 1964 in Toronto, Ontario, and grew up in the suburb of Willowdale. They have seven older siblings. Their father is from Casalvieri, a small town in Ciociaria, Lazio, Italy. Their mother was from England. In 1983, they moved to New York to study fashion at Parsons School of Design, but stayed for only one semester before returning to Toronto.

Finding a financial backer in 1986, they launched their first signature womenswear collection, DEanDAN. By 1988 they had signed on to label Ports International (currently Ports 1961) as creative directors. At the same time, the Catens are designed for their lower-end, leisure brand, Tabi International. In 1991, the brothers moved to Milan, Italy where they worked as designers for the house of Gianni Versace, and denim brand Diesel, the latter of which funded and launched their namesake brand. They debuted their men's collection in 1994, and in 2003, they launched a women's collection and a men's underwear collection.

== Career ==
=== Dsquared² ===
The Dsquared² is an Italian brand and was launched in 1995.

In 2000–01, Madonna commissioned the brothers to design over 150 pieces for her Drowned World Tour 2001 and "Don't Tell Me" music video.

A runway show in 2005 ended with Christina Aguilera stripping male models of their clothes. In September 2007, the Dsquared² fashion show in Milan featured Rihanna entering the stage in an American muscle car, followed by a runway walk. In January 2010, the Dsquared² Autumn/Winter 2010 menswear show in Milan featured Bill Kaulitz descending from the ceiling in a caged elevator à la Rocky Horror Picture Show. Bill Kaulitz opened and closed the Dsquared² Autumn/Winter 2010 menswear show in Milan.

In June 2007, the first Dsquared² flagship was opened in Milan's fashion district. Stores also opened in St. Moritz, Athens, Mykonos, Capri, Istanbul, Kyiv, Cannes, Singapore, Paris, Nicosia and Hong Kong. In March 2015, Dsquared² opened their first flagship store in London. This is the first stage of their major store redesign programme that will continue into the US at the end of 2015. More recent Dsquared² store openings have included Miami, Doha, Los Angeles, New York, Baku, Rome, Istanbul, Prague and Madrid.

In 2013, the Dsquared² brand had a brand turnover of about €200 million. The brand generates most of its revenues through licensing deals.

The brothers stage elaborate fashion shows to showcase their men's and women's apparel, footwear, fragrances, and cosmetics. The brand's slogan is "Born in Canada, living in London, made in Italy".

Their designs have been worn by Britney Spears (2009 world tour The Circus Starring Britney Spears and Tokio Hotel's Welcome to Humanoid City tour), Madonna, Tokio Hotel's lead singer Bill Kaulitz, Justin Timberlake, Kendrick Lamar, Ricky Martin, Nicolas Cage, Lenny Kravitz, Fergie in the music video "Clumsy" and The Black Eyed Peas' "I Gotta Feeling".

=== TV/Radio ===
The Caten brothers host their own radio program called Dean and Dan on Air: Style in Stereo. The show began airing on SiriusXM satellite radio's BPM channel and features a variety of music (including soundtracks from select Dsquared² runway shows), along with celebrity interviews, fashion and political discussions.

=== Other projects ===
The twins have worked on side projects; they have appeared on America's Next Top Model and co-hosted their own show, Launch My Line.

In 2006, the brothers were selected to design the new official uniforms for football team Juventus. In March 2008, the Catens signed an agreement to design sunglasses with Marcolin, an Italian sunglasses and eyeglasses manufacturer. On May 11, 2021, they signed an agreement with Safilo Group S.p.A.

== Marketing ==
Chris Brown wore a Dsquared² hoodie in his video for his 2017 song "To My Bed".

== Awards and honors ==
- 2003 - GQ Men of the Year Breakout Design Award
- 2006 - Golden Needle Award
- 2009 - Attribution of a star on Canada's Walk of Fame in Toronto.
- 2017 - Awarded honorary citizenship of Casalvieri and the first edition of LeColuche prize.
