= The Ballroom =

2007 film directed by Laís Bodanzky

- Theatrical release poster
- Directed by: Laís Bodanzky
- Written by: Luiz Bolognesi
- Produced by: Laís Bodanzky; Caio Gullane; Fabiano Gullane; Débora Ivanov
- Starring: Tonia Carrero; Leonardo Villar; Betty Faria; Stepan Nercessian; Cassia Kiss; Paulo Vilhena; Maria Flor
- Cinematography: Walter Carvalho
- Edited by: Paulo Sacramento
- Music by: Eduardo Bid. Additional music : "C'est si bon" by Henri Betti (1947)
- Production companies: Gullane Filmes; Buriti Filmes; Miravista
- Distributed by: Buena Vista International
- Release dates: November 25, 2007 (Brasília Film Festival); March 21, 2008 (Brazil)
- Running time: 92 minutes
- Countries: Brazil; France
- Language: Portuguese
- Box office: R$1,591,603

The Ballroom (Portuguese: Chega de Saudade) is a 2007 Brazilian-French romantic drama film directed by Laís Bodanzky. The action is set in a dance hall (gafieira) in São Paulo, frequented by elderly people.

== Cast ==
- Tonia Carrero as Alice
- Leonardo Villar as Álvaro
- Stepan Nercessian as Eudes
- Betty Faria as Elza
- Cassia Kiss as Marici
- Paulo Vilhena as Marquinhos
- Maria Flor as Bel
- Elza Soares as Ana
- Jorge Loredo
- Marly Marley as Liana
- Clarisse Abujamra

== Reception ==
David Parkinson of The Guardian called it a "quirky ensemble piece", and praised it for being "superbly choreographed." Daily Express's Allan Hunter labeled it as "bittersweet" and gave a rating 3 out of 5, saying "If Robert Altman had ever made a film about an old-fashioned dance hall it might have looked something like The Ballroom." Writing for the Evening Standard, Derek Malcom commended it by affirming: "If the film doesn't always convince, it has some wonderful moments. Bodanzky’s sympathy with his characters is obvious — and the music is as much an attraction as the series of stories we are told about them." On the other hand, David Jenkins from Time Out gave a more negative review, stating "this wannabe-steamy film never manages to generate any dramatic heat because it spreads itself far too thinly across its oversized and mundane cast."
