= Confessions of an Heiress =

2004 book by Paris Hilton

Confessions of an Heiress: A Tongue-in-Chic Peek Behind the Pose
- Author: Paris Hilton; Merle Ginsberg
- Illustrator: Jeff Vespa (photographer)
- Language: English
- Genre: Autobiography, humor
- Publisher: Fireside / Simon & Schuster
- Publication date: September 7, 2004
- Publication place: United States
- Media type: Print (hardcover)
- Pages: 192
- ISBN: 0-7432-6664-1

Confessions of an Heiress: A Tongue-in-Chic Peek Behind the Pose is a 2004 book co-written by American television personality Paris Hilton and journalist Merle Ginsberg, with photographs by Jeff Vespa. Published by Fireside, an imprint of Simon & Schuster, the book presents a tongue-in-cheek look at Hilton's life as a socialite, model, and reality television star, combining personal anecdotes with lifestyle advice on fashion, beauty, and social etiquette. It features more than 300 full-color photographs. The book became a New York Times bestseller, reaching number seven on the Nonfiction list.

== Background and contents ==
The book was published on September 7, 2004, capitalizing on Hilton's rising fame from the reality television series The Simple Life, which had debuted in December 2003. Excerpts appeared in the September 6, 2004, issue of People magazine ahead of publication.

Rather than a traditional autobiography, the book is structured as a series of personal essays and advice chapters. These include Hilton's "twenty-three rules for How to Be an Heiress," lists of things an heiress should and should not do, and chapters on fashion, beauty, boyfriends, and travel. Hilton discusses her upbringing in the Hilton family, her relationship with sister Nicky, behind-the-scenes stories from The Simple Life, and the life of her pet Chihuahua, Tinkerbell. The book avoids detailed discussion of personal scandals, with Hilton referring only obliquely to a well-known incident as "something I wasn't too proud of."

== Reception ==
Publishers Weekly gave the book a positive review, noting that while the "confessions" were not scandalous, the book displayed "an energetic and earnest young woman fiercely loyal to her family and closest friends." The reviewer described Hilton's advice to readers to "channel your own inner heiress, create your own image, and project an extreme sense of confidence" as "an empowering message for young women." The Vancouver Sun called the book "a glossy little confection" whose underlying message of confidence and self-deprecation was "actually quite sweet," though the reviewer found little depth beyond lifestyle tips.

The book reached number seven on the New York Times Nonfiction bestseller list in the week of September 26, 2004.

== Sequel ==
A companion volume, Your Heiress Diary: Confess It All to Me, was published by Atria Books on November 11, 2005. The follow-up is an interactive guided journal with prompts for readers to record personal details, accompanied by photographs.
