= Marly Marley =

Brazilian actress

- Born: 5 April 1938; Três Lagoas, Mato Grosso do Sul, Brazil
- Died: 10 January 2014 (aged 75); São Paulo, São Paulo, Brazil
- Occupation: Actress
- Years active: 1962–2014
- Spouse: Ary Toledo

Marly Marley (5 April 1938 – 10 January 2014) was a Brazilian actress.

Marly Marley died from pancreatic cancer on 10 January 2014, aged 75, in São Paulo, São Paulo.

== Filmography ==
Year	Title	Role	Notes
1962	O Vendedor de Linguiça		
1963	Casinha Pequenina	Carlota	
1965	O Puritano da Rua Augusta	Carmem	
2007	Chega de Saudade	Liana	(final film role)
