= Ary Toledo =

Brazilian humorist (1937–2024)

- Born: Ary Christoni de Toledo Piza; August 22, 1937; Martinópolis, São Paulo, Brazil
- Died: October 12, 2024 (aged 87); São Paulo, Brazil
- Notable work: Humorist, singer, lyricist and actor

Comedy career
- Years active: 1954–2024
- Genre: Satire
- Website: http://www.arytoledo.com.br/

Ary Christoni de Toledo Piza (August 22, 1937 – October 12, 2024) was a Brazilian humorist, singer, lyricist, and actor.

== Life and career ==
Toledo was born in 1937 in Martinópolis, São Paulo.

Between 1954 and 1955, he began his career a humorist and satirist, first working at Teatro de Arena de São Paulo. He was also a singer and lyricist; his jokes drew humor from the difference between Brazilians and Portuguese. He wrote around 60,000 jokes and described himself as a "garimpeiro of humor". Music was his hobby.

During the Brazilian military government AI-5 he was imprisoned for his anti-government satire, but was soon freed due to his popularity.

Toledo was married to the actress and journalist Marly Marley.

Ary Toledo died in São Paulo on October 12, 2024, at the age of 87.

== Published works ==
=== Books ===
- Descobrimento do Brasil (with Chico de Assis)
- Modinha de ser
- Ovos que a galinha pôs
- Tiradentes
- Os Textículos de Ary Toledo (A Anarquia da Filosofia) (2011)

=== Discography ===
- No Fino Da Bossa (1968–1988) RGE FERMATA LP
- Ary Toledo (1970)
- Antologia do Sexo (1979) Copacabana LP
- Pois é (1982) Copacabana LP
- Na Base do Riso Explícito (1985) Copacabana LP
- Ary Toledo Ao vivo (1968) RGE LP
- A Todo Vapor (2008)

=== Songs ===
As well as being a writer of jokes, he has also written satirical songs such as:

- A moda do Zé
- Dona Maroca – song of a libertine cat of Mme Marioca
- Linda Meu Bem
- Mataram meu carneiro – song in which he cries over the death of his sheep
- Melô do pinto
- O Rico e o Pobre – social critique about politics and how the same words have different meanings for the rich and poor
- Rosinha – humorous love-song

== See also ==
- Brazilian military government AI-5

== Bibliography ==
- Aurélio Buarque de Holanda: Dicionário da Língua Portuguesa, Rio de Janeiro, Positivo, 2005
