= Rio 2096: A Story of Love and Fury =

2013 film directed by Luiz Bolognesi

Rio 2096: A Story of Love and Fury The Immortal Warrior
- Brazilian theatrical poster
- Directed by: Luiz Bolognesi
- Screenplay by: Luiz Bolognesi
- Produced by: Fabiano Gullane; Caio Gullane; Luiz Bolognesi; Laís Bodanzky; Marcos Barreto; Debora Ivanov; Gabriel Lacerda
- Starring: Selton Mello; Camila Pitanga; Rodrigo Santoro; Bemvindo Sequeira
- Cinematography: Anna Caiado
- Edited by: Helena Maura
- Music by: Rica Amabis; Tejo Damasceno; Pupillo
- Production companies: Buriti Filmes; Gullane
- Distributed by: Europa Filmes
- Release dates: March 7, 2013 (MIFF); April 5, 2013 (Brazil)
- Running time: 75 minutes
- Country: Brazil
- Language: Portuguese
- Budget: R$ 4 million

Rio 2096: A Story of Love and Fury or The Immortal Warrior (Portuguese: Uma História de Amor e Fúria) is a 2013 Brazilian adult animated drama film written and directed by Luiz Bolognesi.

The film follows important moments in the history of Brazil, narrated by a character who lives almost 600 years ago, seeking for the resurrection of his beloved Janaína, and coming to his current life in the year 2096. It was one of the 19 submitted for the Academy Award for Best Animated Feature in the 86th edition.

In 2020, the movie was re-released in English territories with English dubbing under the name The Immortal Warrior.

== Plot ==
The film is set in four dates in the history of Brazil: 1566, when the country was discovered by the Portuguese explorers, 1825, in events during slavery; 1968, during the high point of the authoritarian military dictatorship, and 2096, when there will be a war over water. The film narrates the love between Janaina and a native warrior who, when dying, takes the form of a bird. For six centuries, the story of the couple survives through these four stages in the history of Brazil.

== Cast ==
- Selton Mello as Immortal Warrior
- Camila Pitanga as Janaína
- Rodrigo Santoro as Piatã / Junior

== Accolades ==
| Award | Result | Category | Recipient |
|---|---|---|---|
| Annecy International Animated Film Festival | Won | Best Feature | Luiz Bolognesi |
| Strasbourg European Fantastic Film Festival | Won | Audience Award | Luiz Bolognesi |
| 4th BraPeq Brazil Film Festival | Won | Best Film | Luiz Bolognesi |
