= Launch My Line =

- Genre: Reality competition
- Presented by: Dean Caten; Dan Caten
- Judges: Stefani Greenfield; Lisa Kline
- Country of origin: United States
- Original language: English
- No. of seasons: 1
- No. of episodes: 8

Production
- Executive producers: Holly M. Wofford; Vittoria Cacciatore
- Camera setup: Multiple
- Running time: 42 minutes
- Production company: Lake Paradise Entertainment

Original release
- Network: Bravo
- Release: December 2, 2009 – February 3, 2010

Launch My Line is an American reality competition series which premiered on December 2, 2009, on the Bravo cable channel. The show features professionals competing against one another in hopes of winning the chance to launch their own clothing line. Each contestant was paired with a professional designer. The show is hosted by Dean and Dan Caten, founders of fashion label Dsquared².

== Contestants ==
There were 10 contestants competing in Launch My Line. In the order eliminated:

| Celebrity | | Expert | Line | Finish |
|---|---|---|---|---|
| Dan Karaty | Choreographer | Susan Brunet | Urban Street Wear | Eliminated Week 1 |
| David Applebaum | Architect | Julie | Structured Casual Wear | Eliminated Week 2 |
| Kevin Black | Music Executive | Akiko Cook | Urban Cocktail Wear | Eliminated Week 3 |
| Vanessa Gonzalez | Event Director | Tressa | Bold Party Wear | Eliminated Week 4 |
| Marilyn Crawford | CEO | Coco Kliks | Lilly Remarkable; Elegant Business Wear | Eliminated Week 5 |
| Patrick McDonald | Fashion Writer | Roberto Devillacis | Couture Wear | Eliminated Week 6 |
| Louanna Rawls | Wardrobe Stylist | Jim | Chic Classic Wear | Eliminated Week 7 |
| Eric Cubeechee | DJ | Galina Sobolev | Sexy Club Wear | Eliminated Week 8 |
| Merle Ginsberg | Fashion Critic | Thai | Chic Convertible Wear | Eliminated Week 8 |
| Kathy Rose | Jewelry Designer | Emil Gampe | Elegant Contemporary Wear | Winner |

== Contestant progress ==
| Episode | 1 | 2 | 3 | 4^{1} | 5^{2} | 6 | 7 | 8 |
|---|---|---|---|---|---|---|---|---|
| Kathy | SAFE | LOW | WIN | HIGH | SAFE | HIGH | WIN | WINNER |
| Merle | HIGH | HIGH | SAFE | WIN | LOW | WIN | LOW | OUT |
| Eric | SAFE | WIN | SAFE | LOW | WIN | SAFE | HIGH | OUT |
| Louanna | WIN | SAFE | SAFE | LOW | HIGH | LOW | OUT | |
| Patrick | SAFE | SAFE | LOW | SAFE | LOW | OUT | | |
| Marilyn | HIGH | SAFE | HIGH | SAFE | OUT | | | |
| Vanessa | LOW | LOW | LOW | OUT | | | | |
| Kevin | SAFE | SAFE | OUT | | | | | |
| David | LOW | OUT | | | | | | |
| Dan | OUT | | | | | | | |

^1 Merle won immunity
^2 Merle was in the Bottom 3, but was safe because she had won immunity

Key
The designer won Launch My Line
The designer won the challenge
The designer had one of the highest scores for that challenge, but did not win
The designer had one of the lowest scores for that challenge, but was not eliminated
The designer lost and was out of the competition

== Episodes ==
| Episode Number | Episode Title | First Air Date |
|---|---|---|
| 1 - 1 | What's My Line? | December 2, 2009 |
| 1 - 2 | Fashion Forward | December 9, 2009 |
| 1 - 3 | Walk on the Wild Side | December 16, 2009 |
| 1 - 4 | Bare Minimum | December 23, 2009 |
| 1 - 5 | Wild Card | January 6, 2010 |
| 1 - 6 | Stressed Out | January 13, 2010 |
| 1 - 7 | I Want, I Need | January 20, 2010 |
| 1 - 8 | Finale | February 3, 2010 |
