= Rodrigo Santoro =

Brazilian actor (born 1975)

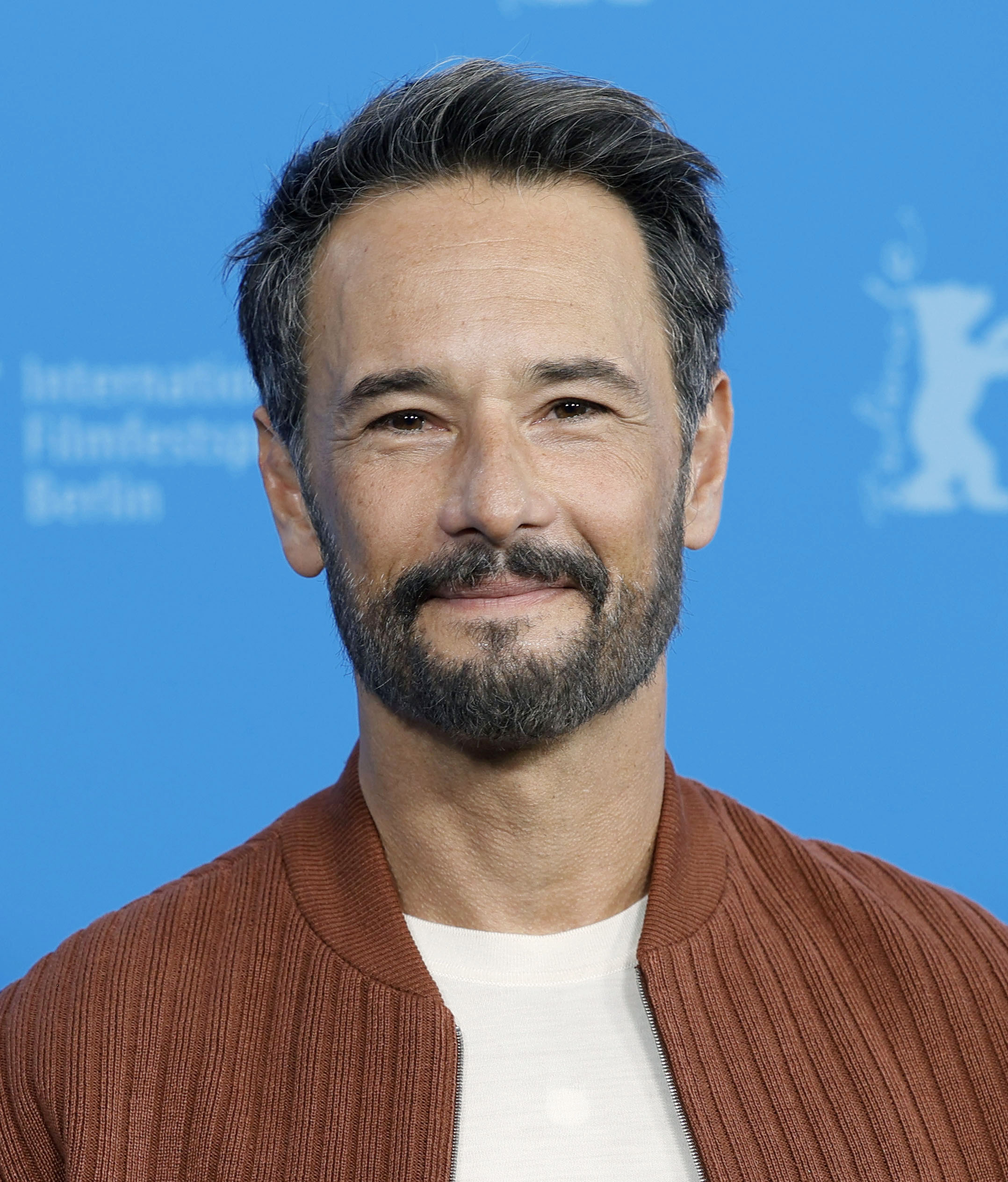
- Santoro at the 2025 Berlinale
- Born: Rodrigo Junqueira Reis Santoro; 22 August 1975 (age 51); Petrópolis, Rio de Janeiro, Brazil
- Education: Pontifical Catholic University of Rio de Janeiro (dropped out)
- Occupation: Actor
- Years active: 1993–present
- Spouse: Mel Fronckowiak (m. 2016)
- Children: 1
- Website: www.rodrigo-santoro.com

Rodrigo Junqueira Reis Santoro (Portuguese pronunciation: [ʁoˈdɾiɡu ʒũˈkejɾɐ ˈʁejs sɐ̃ˈtɔɾu]; born 22 August 1975) is a Brazilian actor. He is known in Brazil for his appearances on local telenovelas, and internationally for his portrayal of the Persian king Xerxes I in the film 300 (2006) and its sequel 300: Rise of an Empire (2014). Other credits include Brainstorm (2001), Carandiru (2003), Love Actually (2003), Che (2008), I Love You Phillip Morris (2009), and Rio (2011), What to Expect When You’re Expecting (2012). He also appeared on the television series Lost in 2006, portraying the character Paulo, and on HBO's Westworld (2016–2020).

== Biography ==
Rodrigo Santoro was born in Petrópolis, the son of Francesco Santoro, an Italian engineer with origins in Paola, province of Cosenza, in Calabria and Maria José Junqueira dos Reis, a Brazilian artist of Portuguese ancestry.

== Career ==
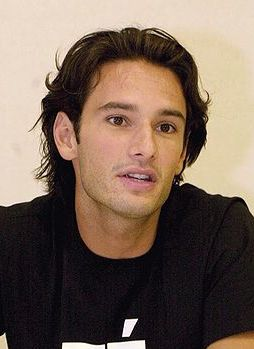
Santoro in 2003

In 1993, while studying Journalism at PUC-Rio, Santoro entered the Actor's Workshop of Rede Globo. He went on to play parts in many of Globo's telenovelas, such as Olho no Olho (1993), Pátria Minha (1994), Explode Coração (1995), O Amor Está no Ar (1997), Suave Veneno (1999) and Mulheres Apaixonadas (2003), as well as the miniseries Hilda Furacão (1998), in the role of a priest. Santoro also voiced the titular character in Stuart Little and its sequel Stuart Little 2 in the Brazilian-dubbed versions.

His first major role in a film production came in 2001, with Bicho de Sete Cabeças (Brainstorm) from Brazilian director Laís Bodansky. By the end of the film, he received a standing ovation from the audience. He also went on to win the festival's best actor trophy. After Bicho, his reputation as an actor had been solidified and he was cast as the male lead in Abril Despedaçado (Behind the Sun), one of the nominees for best foreign film in the 2002 Golden Globe Awards. In the 2003 Hector Babenco film Carandiru, he played Lady Di, a transgender prisoner.

American director Robert Allan Ackerman signed Santoro for his TV production The Roman Spring of Mrs. Stone after being mesmerized by his performance in Bicho de Sete Cabeças. Since Santoro did not have an agent in North America, Ackerman contacted Santoro's father. He spent two months filming in Rome, alongside such actors as Helen Mirren and Anne Bancroft. Soon after he finished shooting for Mrs. Stone, he received an offer from Columbia Pictures for a part in the blockbuster Charlie's Angels: Full Throttle. This role kick-started his career in Hollywood. After Charlie's Angels, he played Karl, an enigmatic chief designer and the love interest of Laura Linney's character, in the romantic comedy Love Actually.

Santoro began obtaining work in the advertising business as he appeared in a commercial campaign with Gisele Bündchen in 2002. He played the male lead in No. 5 The Film, a three-minute-long commercial for Chanel, directed by Baz Luhrmann alongside Nicole Kidman in 2004.

In 2006, Santoro joined the season three cast of the ABC television series Lost as Paulo, a survivor of the Oceanic Flight 815 crash. His first appearance was in the episode "Further Instructions", and his character was killed off in the episode "Exposé". He also voiced the character in the Brazilian-dubbed version of the series.

Santoro was cast as Persian emperor Xerxes I in Zack Snyder's film 300 (2006), based on the Frank Miller comic of the same name. The job had many special requirements, which included intensive workouts for the physicality of the role (Santoro had previously lost 24 pounds (11 kg) to star in a Brazilian miniseries), extensive CGI work to portray the 6'2" Santoro as the seven-foot God-King, a four-and-a-half-hour makeup application process and the complete removal of Santoro's body hair first by waxing and then by shaving when waxing proved too painful. His eyebrows were kept intact, however, covered over with prosthetics and drawn in rather than being shaved. Santoro read the works of Herodotus, an Ancient Greek historian, in order to prepare for his part. Regarding Xerxes, he has stated:

He's rich, he's arrogant, he's a very unstable megalomaniac. He just wants to conquer the world. His ambition is unlimited. He wants glory; he wants victory; he wants eternal fame. Underneath all that wanting, though, he's ultimately weak and very insecure.

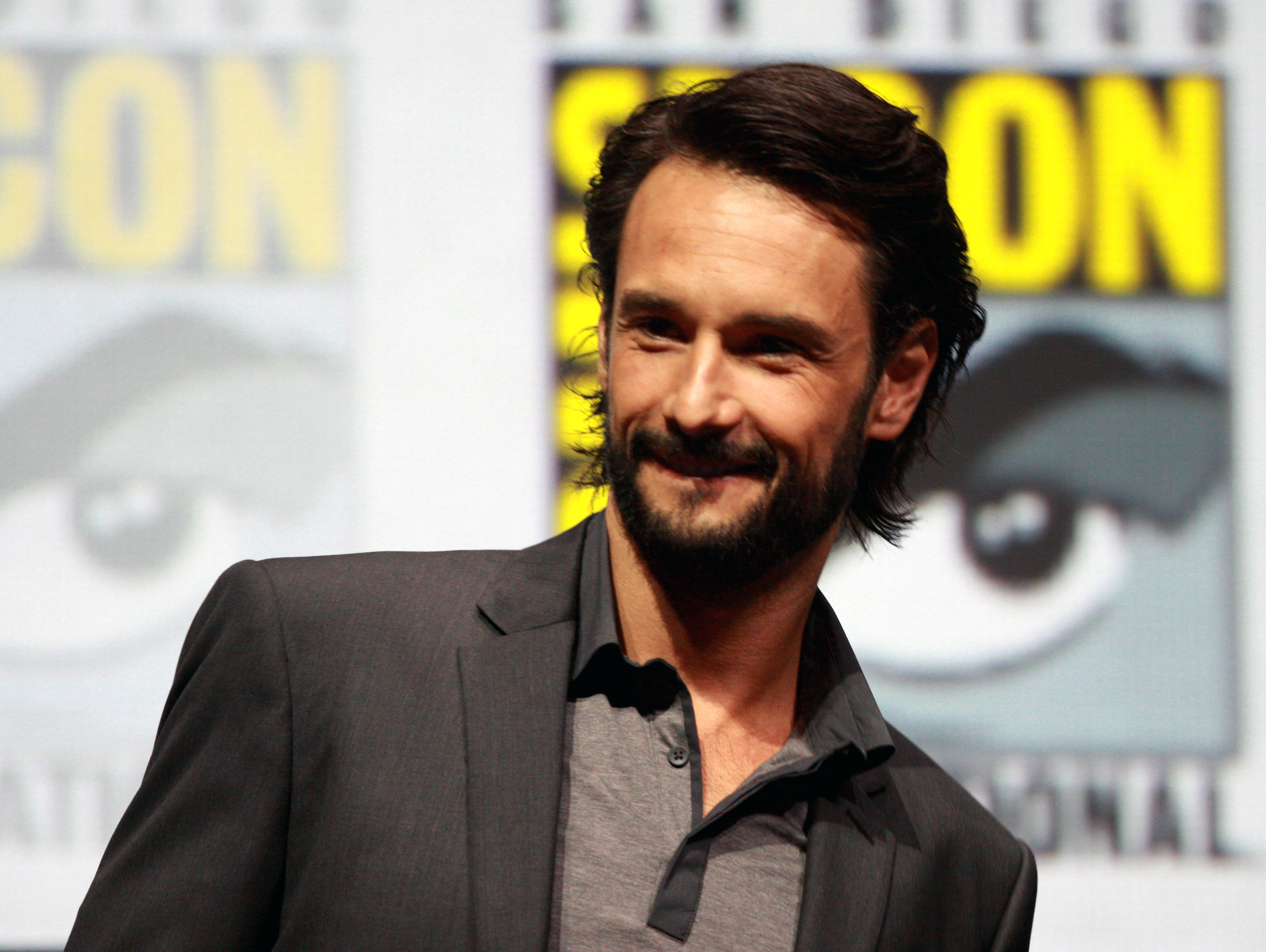
Santoro at the 2013 San Diego Comic-Con, promoting 300: Rise of an Empire

After playing the footballer Heleno de Freitas in the 2012 film Heleno, Santoro co-starred alongside Arnold Schwarzenegger in the 2013 film The Last Stand before playing Garriga in the Will Smith drama film Focus (2015).

Santoro played Jesus in the 2016 historical action film Ben-Hur and received personal blessings from Pope Francis for the role.

In October of the same year, it was confirmed that the actor would return to soap operas after twelve years in Velho Chico, written by Benedito Ruy Barbosa, playing the role of protagonist Afrânio in the first phase, alongside Carol Castro.

== Personal life ==
Santoro was in Ribeirão Preto for the premiere of the 2011 film Meu País, directed by André Ristum. As the character Marcos in the award-winning feature film, he emphasized his strong relationship with the city and the reasons that led him to select it as one of the locations for an avant-première: "My mother's entire family, Junqueira Reis, is from Ribeirão Preto. I've been coming here since I was little. I have a strong relationship with the city.

Santoro dated actress Luana Piovani for three years, from 1997 to 2000, until it was discovered that she was cheating on him with businessman Cristiano Rangel. He dated model Ellen Jabour from 2004 to 2008.

He has been married to actress and presenter Mel Fronckowiak since 2016. The two were purportedly introduced by an assistant director of the soap opera Rebelde, on RecordTV, in which Mel was one of the protagonists. After the soap opera, Mel was left without the flat provided by the broadcaster and, at Santoro's invitation, she started living in his apartment in Leblon. The couple started dating in mid-July 2012 and kept their relationship discreet for 1 year. Santoro proposed to admit the relationship in public, at the launch of Mel's book, at Shopping do Leblon, in Rio de Janeiro, where the actor joined thousands of the actress's fans to receive his personal dedication in the book, on 25 August 2013.

In January 2017, Santoro and Mel announced that they would become parents for the first time. The couple's daughter, Nina, was born on 22 May 2017.

== Filmography ==
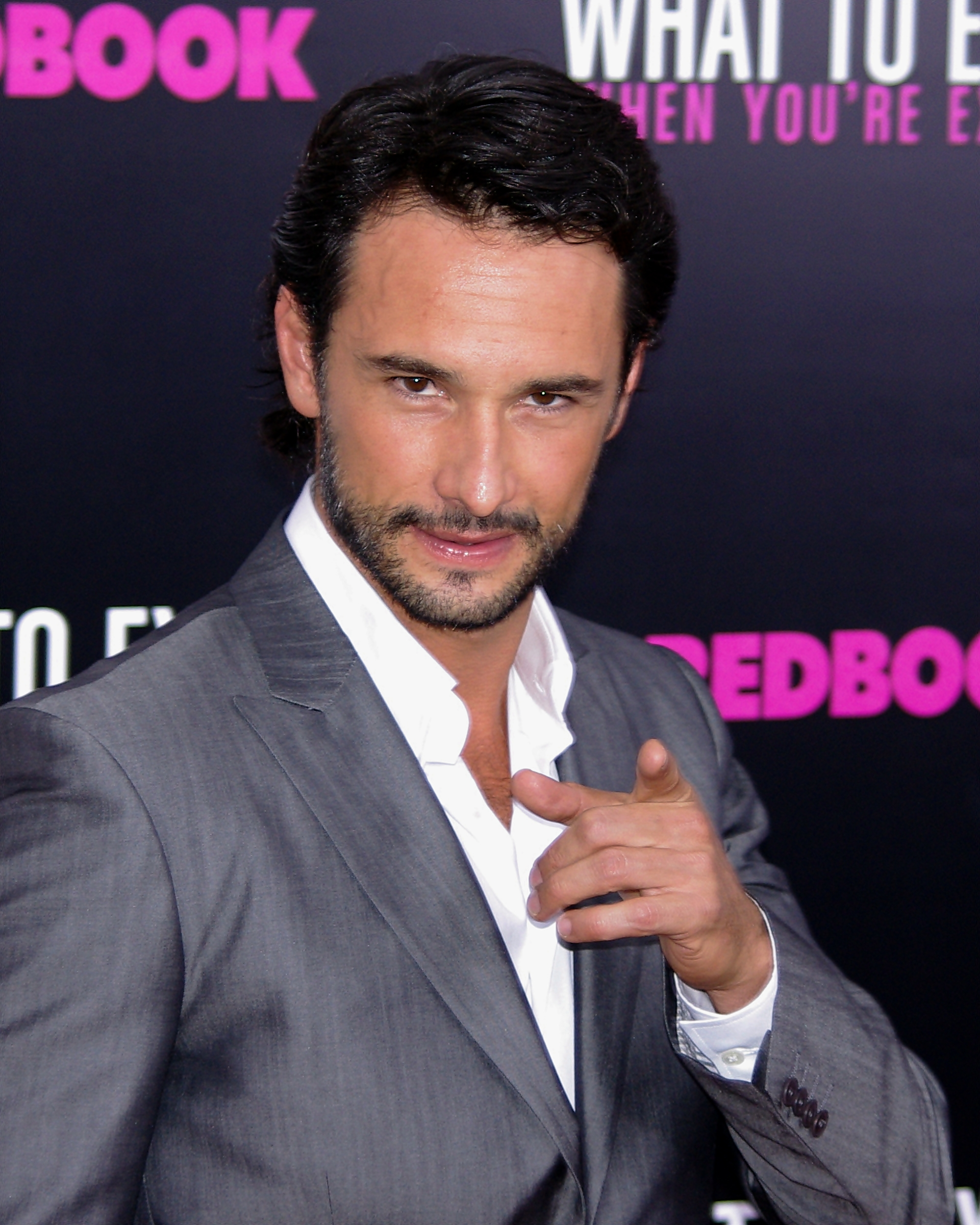
Santoro at the premiere of What to Expect When You're Expecting, 9 May 2012, New York

=== Film ===
Year	Film	Role	Notes
1996	Depois do Escuro	Roberto	
1998	Como Ser Solteiro	Himself	
1998	Hilda Furacão	Frei Malthus	
1999	O Trapalhão e a Luz Azul	Musketeer	
1999	Stuart Little	Stuart Little	Voice (Brazilian Portuguese dub)
2001	Bicho de Sete Cabeças	Wilson Souza Neto	
2001	Abril Despedaçado	Tonho	
2002	Stuart Little 2	Stuart Little	Voice (Brazilian Portuguese dub)
2003	The Roman Spring of Mrs. Stone	Young Man	
2003	Carandiru	Lady Di	
2003	Charlie's Angels: Full Throttle	Randy Emmers	
2003	Love Actually	Karl	
2004	A Dona da História	Luiz Cláudio	
2006	300	Xerxes I	
2007	Não por Acaso	Pedro	
2008	Live, Love, Laugh, But...	Bellboy	Short film
2008	Os Desafinados	Joaquim	
2008	Redbelt	Bruno Silva	
2008	Leonera	Ramiro	
2008	Che	Raúl Castro	
2009	I Love You Phillip Morris	Jimmy Kemple	
2009	Post Grad	David Santiago	
2010	Manual Para Se Defender de Alienígenas, Zumbis e Ninjas	Ninja	Short film
2010	There Be Dragons	Oriol	
2011	Meu País	Marcos	
2011	Rio	Túlio / Soccer Announcer	Voice (also in the Brazilian Portuguese dub)
2012	Hemingway & Gellhorn	Paco Zarra	
2012	Heleno	Heleno de Freitas	
2012	What To Expect When You're Expecting	Alex Castillo	
2012	Reis e Ratos	Roni Rato	
2013	The Last Stand	Frank Martinez	
2013	Rio 2096: A Story of Love and Fury	Piatã / Júnior	
2014	300: Rise of an Empire	Xerxes I	
2014	Rio 2	Túlio	Voice (also in the Brazilian Portuguese dub)
2014	Rio, I Love You	Ele	
2015	Focus	Garriga	
2015	The 33	Laurence Golborne	
2016	Jane Got a Gun	Fitchum	
2016	Ben-Hur	Jesus Christ	
2016	Dominion	Carlos	
2016	Pelé: Birth of a Legend	Brazilian announcer	
2018	A Translator (Un Traductor)	Malin	
2019	Monica and Friends: Bonds	Nutty Ned	
2019	Klaus	Jesper Johansson	Voice (Brazilian Portuguese dub)
2020	Project Power	Biggie	
2021	Save Ralph	Rabbit	Voice; short film
2021	7 Prisoners	Luca	
2024	Noah's Ark	Vini	Voice
2025	The Blue Trail (O Último Azul)	Cadu	It had its world premiere in February 2025, as part of the 75th Berlin International Film Festival, in Competition.
2026	Beast Race	Abu	
2026	Runner	Damian Zaldívar	

=== Television ===
Year	TV show	Role	Note
1993–1994	Olho no Olho	Pedro	Main role
1994–1995	Pátria Minha	Fernando	Main role
1995–1996	Explode Coração	Sérgio	Main role
1996	Sai de Baixo	Gama	Episode: "Sexo Nosso de Cada Dia"
1996	Comédia da Vida Privada	Diogo	Episode: "Mulheres"
1997	O Amor Está no Ar	Léo	
1998	Hilda Furacão	Malthus Librelato	Main role
1999	Belo e as Feras	Henrique	Episode: "Só o Amor Destrói"
1999	Suave Veneno	Eliseu Vieira	Main role
2001	Os Normais	Júlio	Episode: "Grilar é Normal"
2001	Estrela-Guia	Carlos Charles Pimenta	Main role
2002	Pastores da Noite	Padre Gomes	Television film
2003	Mulheres Apaixonadas	Diogo Ribeiro Alves	Main role
2005	Hoje É Dia de Maria	Amado	Main role
2005	Hoje é Dia de Maria: Segunda Jornada	Dom Chico Chicote	Main role
2006	Lost	Paulo	Main role (season 3)
2009	Som & Fúria	Sanjay	Main role
2010	Afinal, o Que Querem as Mulheres?	Rodrigo Santoro (fictional version)	Episode: "Elas?"
2010	Papai Noel Existe	Robson Luiz	Television film
2012	As Brasileiras	Carioca	Episode: "A Indomável do Ceará"
2016	Velho Chico	Afrânio de Sá Ribeiro	Guest role, 24 episodes
2016–2022	Westworld	Hector Escaton / Ettore	Main role (seasons 1–2); Guest role (seasons 3–4)
2019	Solteira e Boa Rapariga	David	Main role
2019	Reprisal	Joel Kelly	Main role
2021	Sessão de Terapia	Dr. Davi Greco	Main role (season 5)
2022	Sin límites	Ferdinand Magellan	Main role
2023	Wolf Pack	Garrett Briggs	Main role
2024	Good Morning, Verônica	Jerônimo	Main role (season 3)
2026	Brazil 70: The Third Star	João Saldanha	Main role

=== Music videos ===
Year	Title	Artist
2018	"Ocean"	Alok, Zeeba and IRO

== Awards and nominations ==
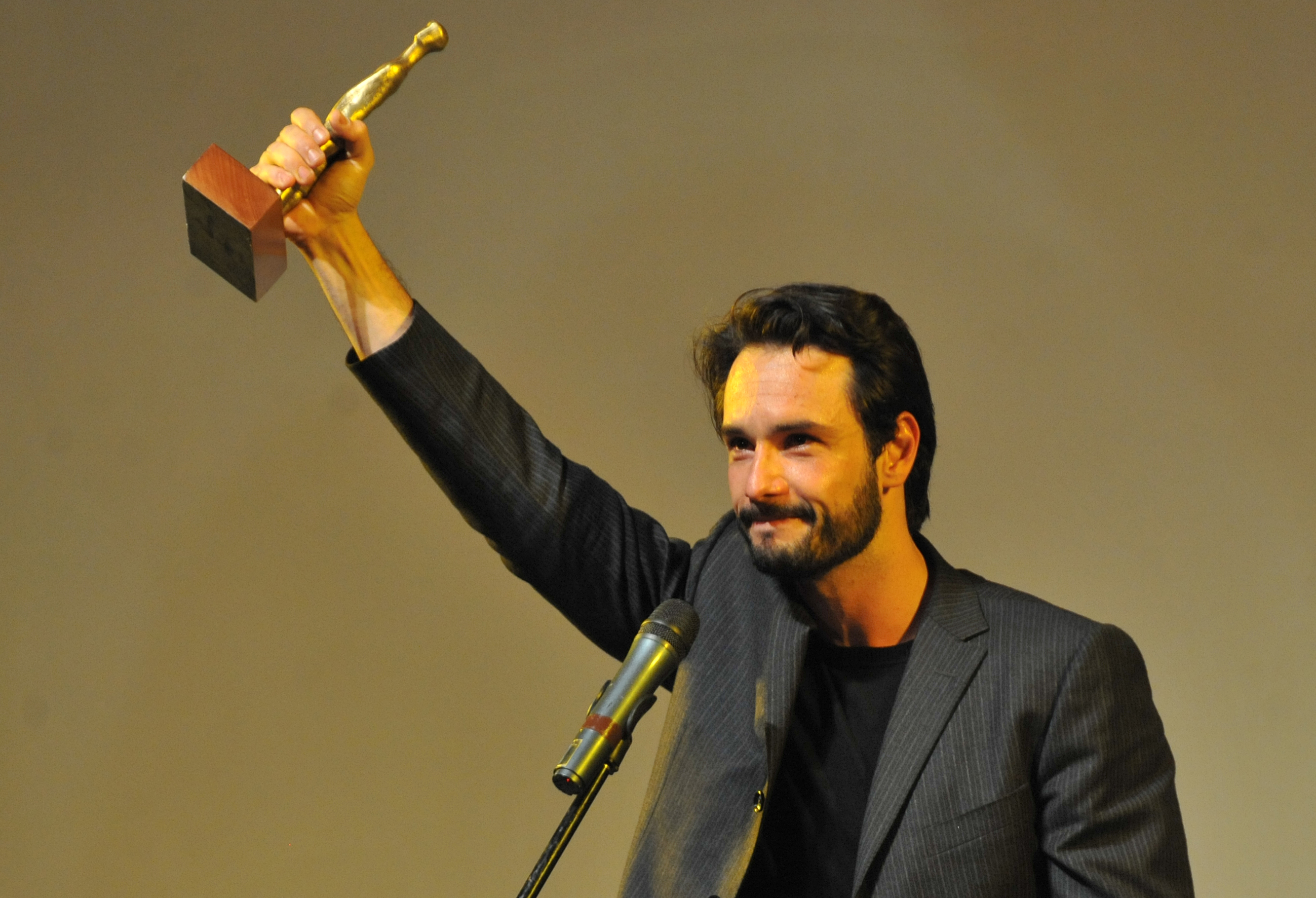
Santoro holding the statue he won at the 44th Festival de Brasília for the movie Meu País, in 2011.

Year	Award	Category	Nominated work	Result
2000	Festival de Brasília	Best Actor	Bicho de Sete Cabeças	Won
2001	Recife Film Festival	Best Actor	Bicho de Sete Cabeças	Won
2001	Brazil Quality Award	Best Actor	Bicho de Sete Cabeças	Won
2001	Santo Domingo Film Festival	Best Actor	Bicho de Sete Cabeças	Won
2001	SESC Best Film Festival	Best Actor	Bicho de Sete Cabeças	Won
2002	Cinema Brazilian Grand Prix	Best Actor	Bicho de Sete Cabeças	Won
2002	APCA Trophy	Best Actor	Bicho de Sete Cabeças	Won
2002	Cartagena Film Festival	Best Actor	Bicho de Sete Cabeças	Won
2002	Cero Latitud Film Festival	Best Actor	Bicho de Sete Cabeças	Won
2003	Festival de Brasília	Best Actor	Carandiru	Won
2004	Cannes Film Festival	Chopard Trophy of Male Revelation	—N/a	Won
2007	MTV Movie Awards	Best Villain	300	Nominated
2011	Festival de Brasília	Best Actor	Meu País	Won
2011	Havana Film Festival	Best Actor	Heleno	Won
2012	Lima Film Festival	Best Actor	Heleno	Won
2012	ALMA Awards	Best Actor	What to Expect When You're Expecting	Nominated
2013	Grande Prêmio do Cinema Brasileiro	Best Actor	Heleno	Nominated
2016	Troféu APCA	Best Actor	Velho Chico	Nominated
2016	Prêmio Extra de Televisão	Best Actor	Velho Chico	Nominated
2018	Filming Italy Sardegna Festival	movie highlights and series in the year	—N/a	Won
2018	Cinema PE - Audiovisual Festival	work set	—N/a	Won

=== Other nominations and honors ===
- 2004: On People Magazine's 50 Most Beautiful list 2004
- 2006: 12th position on People Magazine's 2006 Sexiest Man Alive
- 2008: 16th position on E!'s 2008 Sexiest man of the world
