= Merle Ginsberg =

Writer, television personality, and fashion expert

Merle Ginsberg (born 1953) is an American columnist, and fashion editor and journalist who has worked for numerous publications such as Rolling Stone, New York Post, Harper's Bazaar, Marie Claire, The Cut, and The New York Times. Ginsberg is perhaps best known for serving as a main judge on the first two seasons of RuPaul's Drag Race (2009–2010).

== Career ==
After working as a hotel receptionist, model, and cocktail waitress in college, Ginsberg commenced her career as a journalist at the alternative New York City-based newspaper SoHo Weekly News. Simultaneously, she worked as a rock critic for The Village Voice and theater critic for The Villager. When SoHo Weekly closed in 1982, Ginsberg relocated to Los Angeles and began writing news segments for newly-launched MTV. In California, she worked for VH1 and E Entertainment.

In 1992, Ginsberg was hired by Patrick McCarthy to write for both W Magazine and Women's Wear Daily, where McCarthy served as chairman and editorial director for both, as the publications west coast editor. She left W in 2002, and began freelancing for InStyle, New York Times Magazine, and Harper's Bazaar. After feeling that magazines were dying, Ginsberg began working online as an editor and blogger for The Find, before starting her own blog Fashion Rules. In 2004, Ginsberg received critical acclaim for her co-authoring of Paris Hilton's first autobiography, Confessions of an Heiress: A Tongue-in-Chic Peek Behind the Pose, which became a New York Times bestseller.

In the summer of 2008, Ginsberg was approached by World of Wonder producers Randy Barbato and Fenton Bailey to be a judge on Logo TV's reality competition show RuPaul's Drag Race, which aired in February 2009. Also in 2009, she appeared on Bravo's Launch My Line as a contestant, finishing as the runner-up.

In 2010, Ginsberg was recommended by writer and friend Bill Higgins to newly-appointed CEO of The Hollywood Reporter, Janice Min, who was looking for writers for the forthcoming renovation of the magazine. After Higgins told Ginsberg her name had been mentioned in a meeting, Ginsberg emailed Min herself, and was hired three days later. In October 2011, The Hollywood Reporter announced the launch of its "Fash Track" entertainment and fashion blog, led by Ginsberg. By 2014, she was the senior style writer for the publications style site, Pret-a-Reporter.

In 2013, Ginsberg won Best Feature/Commentary Under 1,000 Words at the SoCal Journalism Awards for her "Red Carpet War Stories" article. In 2015, Ginsberg was presented with the award for Best Fashion Issue of a Non-Fashion Magazine by Wiz Khalifa at the third annual Daily Front Row Fashion Media Awards.

In January 2019, as friend Maer Roshan became editor in chief of Los Angeles Magazine, Ginsberg began working as a freelance writer. In March 2020, she was hired by the magazine as a full-time style editor.
