= Gilberto Dimenstein =

Brazilian journalist (1956–2020)

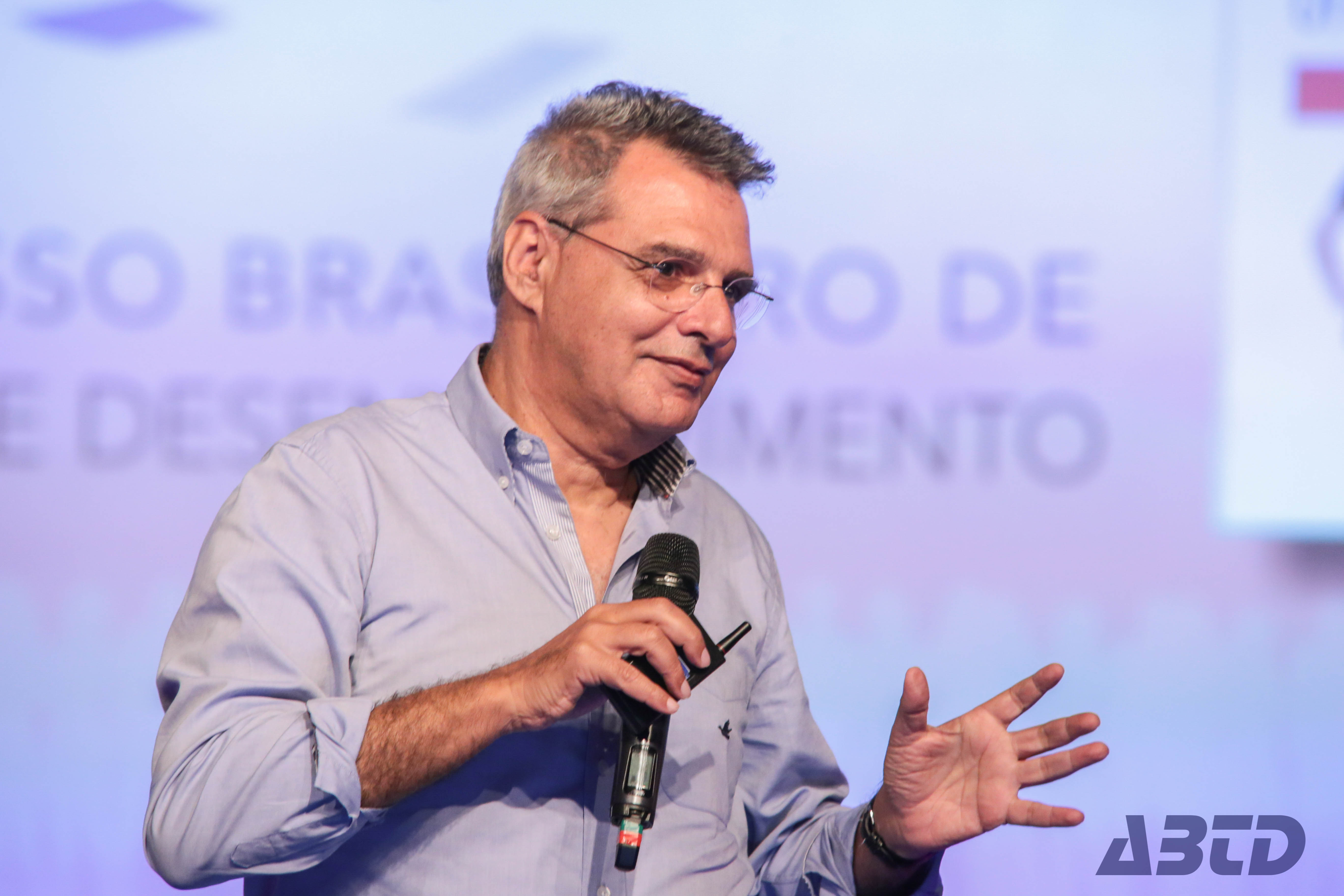
- Born: August 28, 1956
- Died: May 29, 2020 (aged 63); São Paulo, Brazil
- Occupation: journalist
- Known for: works regarding human rights
- Notable work: publisher of Catraca Livre

Gilberto Dimenstein (August 28, 1956 – May 29, 2020) was a Brazilian journalist. He was the publisher of Catraca Livre, appointed by Financial Times as one of the most inspiring applications of digital technology for social good. He also kept a column at CBN radio.

Dimestein published many works regarding human, children's and youth rights, besides works on citizenship.

For 2011 he was a Fellow at Harvard's Advanced Leadership Initiative, where he worked in partnership with researchers at the Media Lab of MIT on an Internet program to help cities transform themselves into learning communities (Open City Labs, known as "Catraca Livre" (Free Turnstile) in Brazil).

Dimenstein started his career at Shalom, a magazine dedicated to the Jewish community. Subsequently, he worked in Veja, Jornal do Brasil, Correio Braziliense, Última Hora.

For his reporting on social issues and his experiences with educational projects, Gilberto Dimenstein was named by Época magazine in 2007 as one of the hundred most influential figures in the country. Among the many awards he has won are the National Award for Human Rights along with D. Paulo Evaristo Arns, the Criança e Paz Award from UNICEF, McArthur Foundation grant to investigate the sexual exploitation of children and Honorable Mention for the Maria Moors Cabot Award from Columbia University School of Journalism in New York. He also won the Esso prize twice (main category in 1988 and Political Information in 1989, both when working at Folha de S.Paulo ) and the 1994 Jabuti prize for best non-fiction book with O Cidadão de Papel.

Dimenstein was one of the creators of Andi (News Agency for Children's Rights), which is circulated in Brazil and several countries in Latin America. In 2009, a document prepared at Harvard Business School, named him as an example of community innovation for his neighborhood-school project initially developed in São Paulo and replicated across the country.

Dimenstein's website, Catraca Livre, caused outrage among Brazilians due to its coverage of LaMia Flight 2933 crash. Such coverage included posting selfies sent by players to friends on social media and sensationalist headlines and associated stories. Dimenstein issued apologies, claiming he "had won many journalistic prizes before".

Dimenstein sued comedian Danilo Gentili over Facebook posts Gentili made. Gentili's posts were a reply to scathing comments Dimenstein made at Catraca Livre website on one of the comedian's jokes with members of Gentili's staff.

== Death ==
Dimenstein died on May 29, 2020, in São Paulo, after complications of pancreatic cancer.
