= Luiz Bolognesi =

Brazilian screenwriter

Luiz Roberto Bolognesi is a Brazilian screenwriter. He won several awards as a screenwriter, including "Best Screenplay" in Grande Prêmio Cinema Brasil, Recife Cinema Festival and Troféu APCA.

== Filmography ==
- Rio 2096: A Story of Love and Fury (2013) (writer, director)
- Bingo: The King of the Mornings (2017) (writer)
- Ex Shaman (2018)
- "The Last Forest" (2021) (Director)
