= Stuart Angel Jones =

Brazilian revolutionary

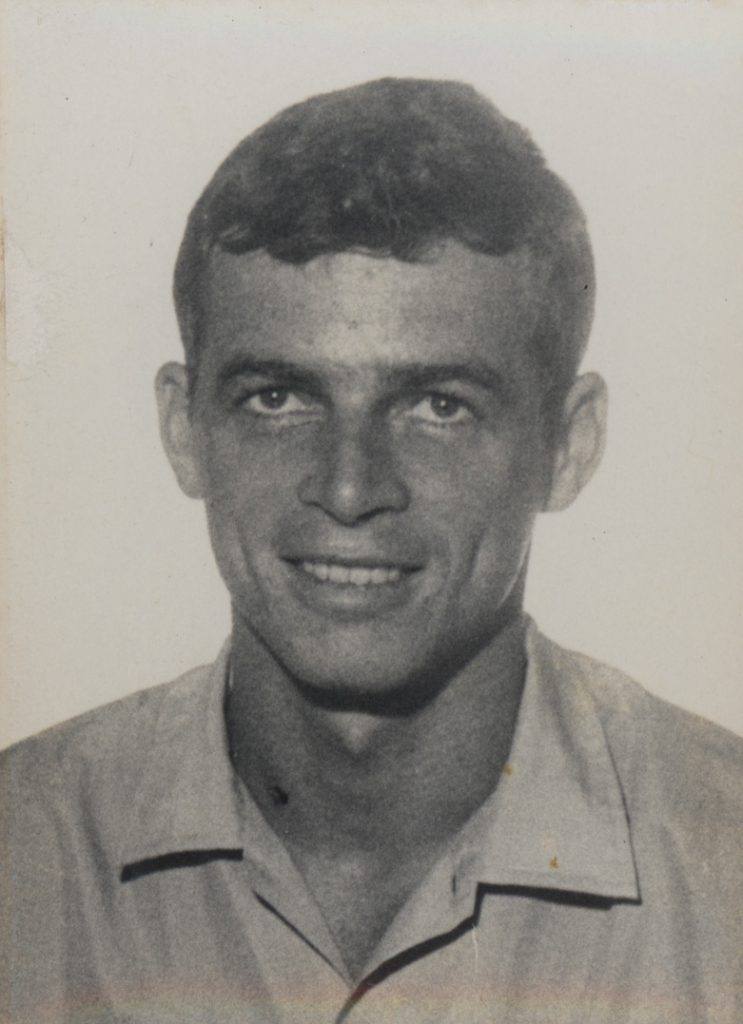
- Born: Stuart Edgart Angel Jones; 11 January 1946; Salvador, Bahia, Brazil
- Died: 14 May 1971 (aged 25); Rio de Janeiro, Brazil
- Citizenship: Brazil; United States
- Occupations: Economics student at Federal University of Rio de Janeiro; Rowing athlete at Flamengo
- Movement: MR-8

Stuart Edgart Angel Jones (January 11, 1946 – June 14, 1971) was an economics student at the Federal University of Rio de Janeiro (UFRJ), a member of the 8th October Revolutionary Movement (MR8). He took part in the armed struggle against the military dictatorship in Brazil, being arrested, tortured, murdered and reported missing. He was the son of the well-known fashion designer Zuzu Angel, who made numerous reports about his death and disappearance and brother of a journalist Hildegard Angel.

== Biography ==
=== First years and education ===
Stuart Angel Jones was the son of American salesman Norman Jones and Zuleika Angel Jones from Minas Gerais, better known as Zuzu Angel, an internationally renowned costume and fashion designer. He was a two-time Rio de Janeiro rowing champion for Clube de Regatas do Flamengo as a teenager (1964 and 1965), was a student from Economics in Federal University of Rio de Janeiro (UFRJ). He had dual Brazilian and American citizenship.

At the turn of the 1960s and 1970s, he joined the 8th October Revolutionary Movement (MR8), a socialist ideology group that waged an armed struggle against the military dictatorship, where he used the aliases “Paulo” and “Henrique”. After being accused of robbing and kidnapping the American ambassador to Brazil, Charles Burke Elbrick, Stuart was arrested, tortured and killed by members of the Aeronautics Information Center (CISA) on June 14, 1971, at the age of 25. He was married to fellow militant and guerrilla Sônia de Moraes Angel, who was arrested, tortured and killed two years later and also reported missing.

=== Death ===
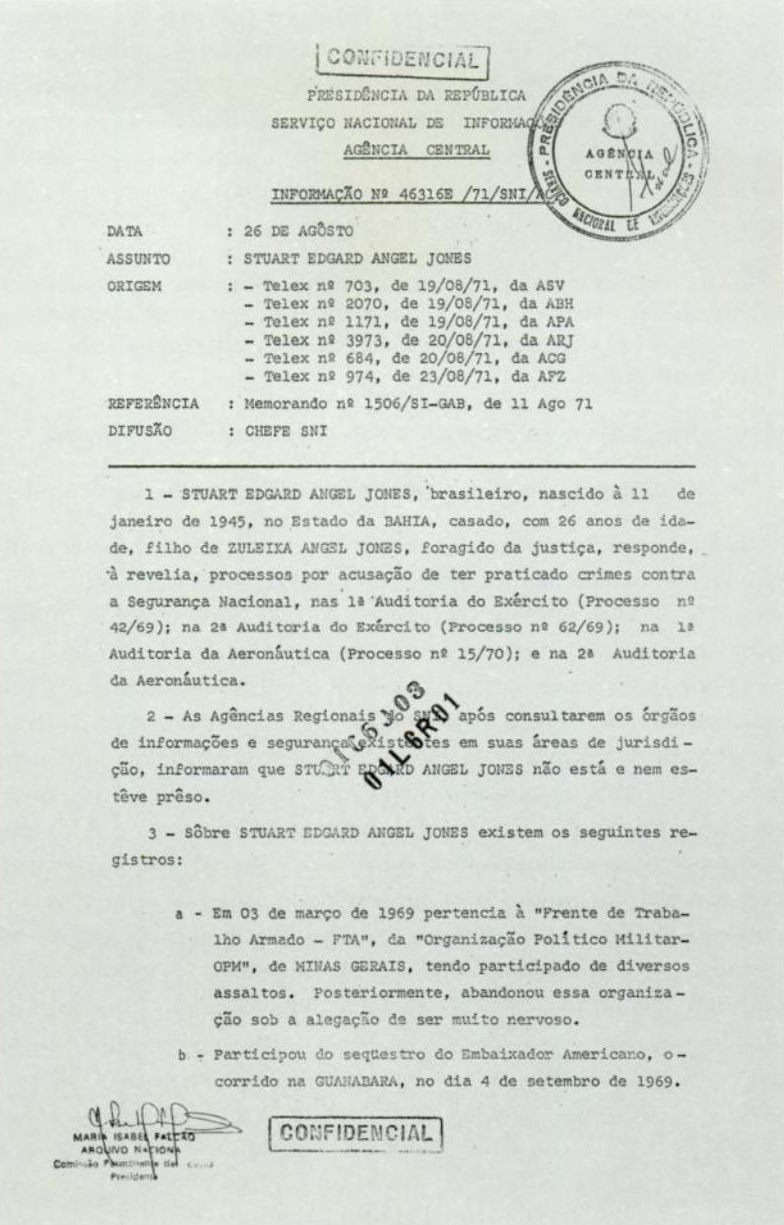
SNI file on Stuart.

Arrested near his home in the Grajaú neighborhood, close to 28 de Setembro Avenue, in the North Zone of Rio de Janeiro, Stuart was taken by CISA agents to Galeão Air Force Base for interrogation. From him, the military wanted information on the location of former captain Carlos Lamarca, head of the MR8 and then the dictatorship's most wanted man. Refusing to talk, he was barbarously tortured and beaten. He was then taken to the base yard and died as a result of his mistreatment.

The best known and most widespread version of his torture and death was given by former guerrilla Alex Polari, also imprisoned there, who watched the torture of Stuart from the window of his cell. He was tied to a car and dragged around the barracks' courtyard. José Bezerra da Silva, who served there as a military corporal between 1971 and 1979, and who was also the victim of aggression from his colleagues in uniform, after complaining about the violence practiced against the militant, confirmed Polari's version. At times, between the laughter, questions and jokes made by the military, he was forced to put his mouth to the vehicle's exhaust and inhale all the toxic gases it emitted. Polari also says in the letter sent to Zuzu Angel on Mother's Day, in which she notified her of her son's whereabouts, that after being untied, the militant was left abandoned on the ground, his body already badly flayed, where he continued to cry out for water through the night. In possession of it, the stylist denounced the murder of Stuart - who had both Brazilian and American citizenship - to Democrat Senator Ted Kennedy, who took the case to the United States Congress.

The book Desaparecidos Políticos, by Reinaldo Cabral and Ronaldo Lapa, points to two versions of the disappearance of the guerrilla's body: “The first is that he was transported by a Navy helicopter to a military area located in Restinga da Marambaia, in Barra de Guaratiba, near the (then) rural area of Rio, and thrown into the open sea by the same helicopter. But, according to other information, Stuart's body was buried as an indigent, with his name changed, in a cemetery in a suburb of Rio, probably Inhaúma. Those responsible, according to them, were "Brigadiers Burnier and Carlos Afonso Dellamora, the former head of the Air Zone and the latter commander of CISA; Lieutenant-Colonel Abílio Alcântara, Lieutenant-Colonel Muniz, Captain Lúcio Barroso and Major Pena – all from the same organization; Captain Alfredo Poeck – from Navy Intelligence Center (CENIMAR); Mário Borges and Jair Gonçalves da Mota - agents from Department of Political and Social Order (DOPS)".

In 2013, a new name was discovered, joining the others mentioned after cross-checking data with survivors' testimonies: that of Sergeant Abílio Correa de Souza, code-named “Pascoal”, the real identity of the Air Force petty officer at the time only identified as Petty Officer “Abílio Alcântara”, a military officer trained in combat intelligence and counter-espionage at the Western Hemisphere Institute for Security Cooperation at Fort Gulick in Panama. Abílio was to be Stuart's main torturer and the last person to see him alive in his cell.

Stuart, according to witness statements, was the only prisoner killed by the Air Force on that occasion, among several other imprisoned guerrillas. His death led to the transfer of all the prisoners from the CISA cells to other places. At the end of that year, the entire leadership of the Air Force was replaced, due to the pressure caused by the incessant search for and denunciations of Stuart's disappearance by his mother, Zuzu Angel, using the press in Brazil and abroad. He was acquitted by the Aeronautics Court, ratified in 1973 by the Supreme Military Court (STM), of the charge of contravention of the National Security Act.

=== Disappeared ===
For the next few years, Stuart's mother, Zuzu, went on a pilgrimage to the military authorities, trying to get explanations and information about her son's body, which was officially reported missing. Her campaign reached the world of fashion, where she featured prominently, showing collections of clothes printed with red spots, caged birds and war motifs. The angel, wounded and gagged in her prints, also became the symbol of her son. Zuzu even held a protest parade in New York City, at the Brazilian consulate in the city.

Using her relative international notoriety, she involved Hollywood celebrities who were her clients, such as Joan Crawford, Liza Minnelli and Kim Novak, in her cause, and during the visit of Henry Kissinger, then US Secretary of State, to Brazil, she even broke through security to hand him a dossier with the facts about the death of her son, also a holder of US citizenship. The dossier was also sent to the US Secretary of State.

Zuzu died in 1976, in a suspected car accident in the São Conrado neighborhood of Rio de Janeiro, without ever being able to discover the whereabouts of Stuart Angel's body. In 1998, the Special Commission on Political Disappearances judged the case under case number 237/96 and recognized the military dictatorship as responsible for the death of the fashion designer.

In 2013, unpublished documents were discovered in the archives of the now-defunct National Intelligence Service (SNI), available at the National Archives, which include Report No. 1008, dated September 14, 1971. The 167-page document, classified as confidential, shows that Stuart's death was well documented by the agencies of political repression, with the title “Stuart Angel Jones - Deceased”. Another document, “Informação nº. 4.057”, discovered in the archives of the SNI in São Paulo, lists his name alongside 89 other guerrillas killed during the period, with the date of September 16, 1971, two days after his disappearance. The document is also classified as confidential.

== In popular culture ==
In 2006, the life of Stuart and his mother was brought to the screen in the movie Zuzu Angel, directed by Sérgio Rezende, with Daniel de Oliveira and Patrícia Pillar in the roles of the guerrilla militant and the fashion designer.

The writer José Louzeiro wrote the novel Em Carne Viva, with characters and situations that recall the drama of Stuart Angel's death.

== Tributes ==
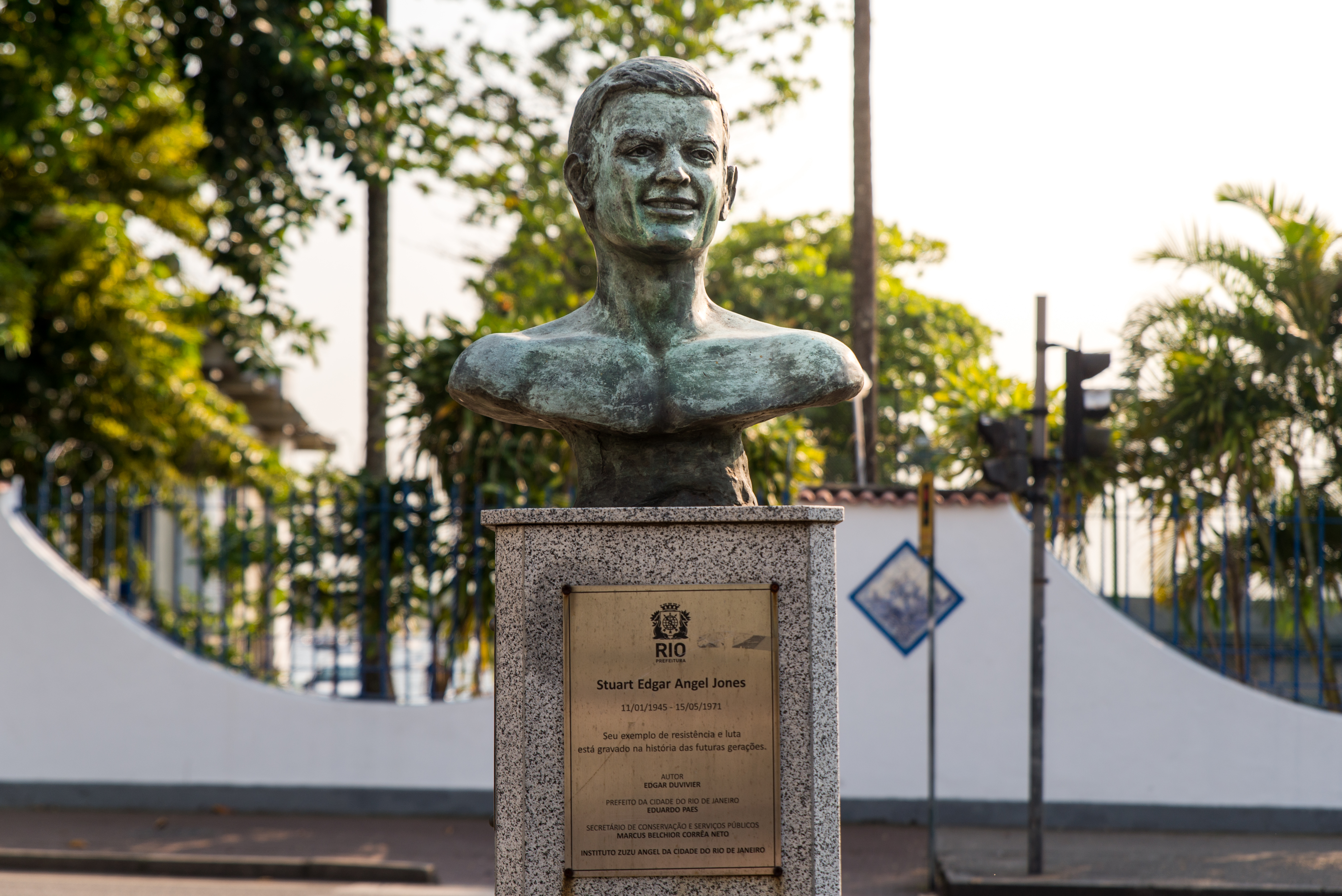
Stuart Angel sculpture in Urca.

- In 2010, Stuart was honored by the Clube de Regatas do Flamengo with the inauguration of a memorial at the Sede náutica do Clube de Regatas do Flamengo, which is part of the club's sports complex in Gávea, which was attended by his sister, journalist Hildegard Angel, Flamengo president Patrícia Amorim and Paulo Vannuchi, Minister of Human Rights in the Lula government.
- On August 28, 2015, a bust of Stuart Angel was unveiled in front of the campus of the Federal University of Rio de Janeiro, in the Rio de Janeiro neighborhood of Urca, where Stuart studied economics and began his political activism in the Brazilian Communist Party (PCB). The work, produced by musician and artist Edgar Duvivier, shows a smiling Stuart Angel, conveying serenity and optimism. The inauguration was attended by the guerrilla's sister, Hildegard Angel, as well as family friends and colleagues from his teenage years.

Stuart did not complete his undergraduate degree in economics, as he was prevented from doing so by the military, which controlled the institution at the time. The fact that he is facing the university campus with a smiling expression gives the impression that he had hopes of returning to complete his studies.

— Hildegard Angel

- In 2023, the Federal Public Prosecutor's Office (MPF) asked Clube de Regatas do Flamengo for information about the whereabouts of a bronze plaque that honored student Stuart Angel at its rowing headquarters. According to the MPF, the object was on a memorial at the venue and was removed during the 2016 Summer Olympics.

== Achievements ==
- Two-time Rio rowing champion for Flamengo - 1964, 1965.
