= Prêmio Extra de Televisão de melhor atriz =

- Awarded for: Best Performance by an Actress
- Country: Brazil
- Presented by: Jornal Extra
- First award: 1998
- Currently held by: Adriana Esteves; Justiça (2016)

The Prêmio Extra de Televisão de melhor atriz (English: Extra Television Awards for Best Actress) is a category of the Prêmio Extra de Televisão, destined to the best actress of the Brazilian television.

== Winner ==
=== 1998–2007 ===
- 1998 – Susana Vieira in Por Amor
- 1999 – Letícia Spiller in Suave Veneno
- 2000 – Giovanna Antonelli in Laços de Família
- 2001 – Zezé Polessa in Porto dos Milagres
- 2002 – Débora Falabella in O Clone
- 2003 – Giulia Gam in Mulheres Apaixonadas
- 2004 – Susana Vieira in Senhora do Destino
- 2005 – Eliane Giardini in América
- 2006 – Lília Cabral in Páginas da Vida
- 2007 – Camila Pitanga in Paraíso Tropical

=== 2008–present ===
- 2008 – Patrícia Pillar in A Favorita
  - Aline Moraes in Duas Caras
  - Ana Paula Arósio in Ciranda de Pedra
  - Cláudia Raia in A Favorita
  - Renata Dominguez in Amor e Intrigas
- 2009 – Letícia Sabatella in Caminho das Índias
  - Flávia Alessandra in Caras & Bocas
  - Grazi Massafera in Negócio da China
  - Juliana Paes in Caminho das Índias
  - Nathalia Dill in Paraíso
  - Paloma Duarte in Poder Paralelo
- 2010 – Nathalia Dill in Escrito nas Estrelas
  - Adriana Esteves in Dalva e Herivelto: uma Canção de Amor
  - Alinne Moraes in Viver a Vida
  - Claudia Raia in Ti Ti Ti
  - Mariana Ximenes in Passione
  - Paolla Oliveira in Cama de Gato
- 2011 – Andréa Beltrão in Tapas & Beijos
  - Alinne Moraes in O Astro
  - Carolina Ferraz in O Astro
  - Cleo Pires in Araguaia
  - Glória Pires in Insensato Coração
  - Cássia Kis Magro in Morde & Assopra
- 2012 – Adriana Esteves in Avenida Brasil
  - Cláudia Abreu in Cheias de Charme
  - Christiane Torloni in Fina Estampa
  - Debora Falabella in Avenida Brasil
  - Marjorie Estiano in A Vida da Gente
  - Taís Araújo in Cheias de Charme
- 2013 – Giovanna Antonelli in Salve Jorge
  - Giulia Gam in Sangue Bom
  - Nanda Costa in Salve Jorge
  - Paolla Oliveira in Amor à Vida
  - Sophie Charlotte in Sangue Bom
  - Susana Vieira in Amor à Vida
- 2014 – Lília Cabral in Império
  - Bruna Marquezine in Em Família
  - Drica Moraes in Império
  - Isis Valverde in Boogie Oogie
  - Julia Lemmertz in Em Família
  - Juliana Paes in Meu Pedacinho de Chão
- 2015 – Marieta Severo in Verdades Secretas
  - Glória Pires in Babilônia
  - Irene Ravache in Além do Tempo
  - Paolla Oliveira in Felizes para Sempre?
  - Vanessa Giácomo in A Regra do Jogo
- 2016 – Adriana Esteves in Justiça
  - Andreia Horta in Liberdade, Liberdade
  - Camila Pitanga in Velho Chico
  - Débora Bloch in Justiça
  - Marina Ruy Barbosa in Totalmente Demais
  - Tatá Werneck in Haja Coração
