= Patrícia Pillar =

Brazilian actress

Patricia Pillar
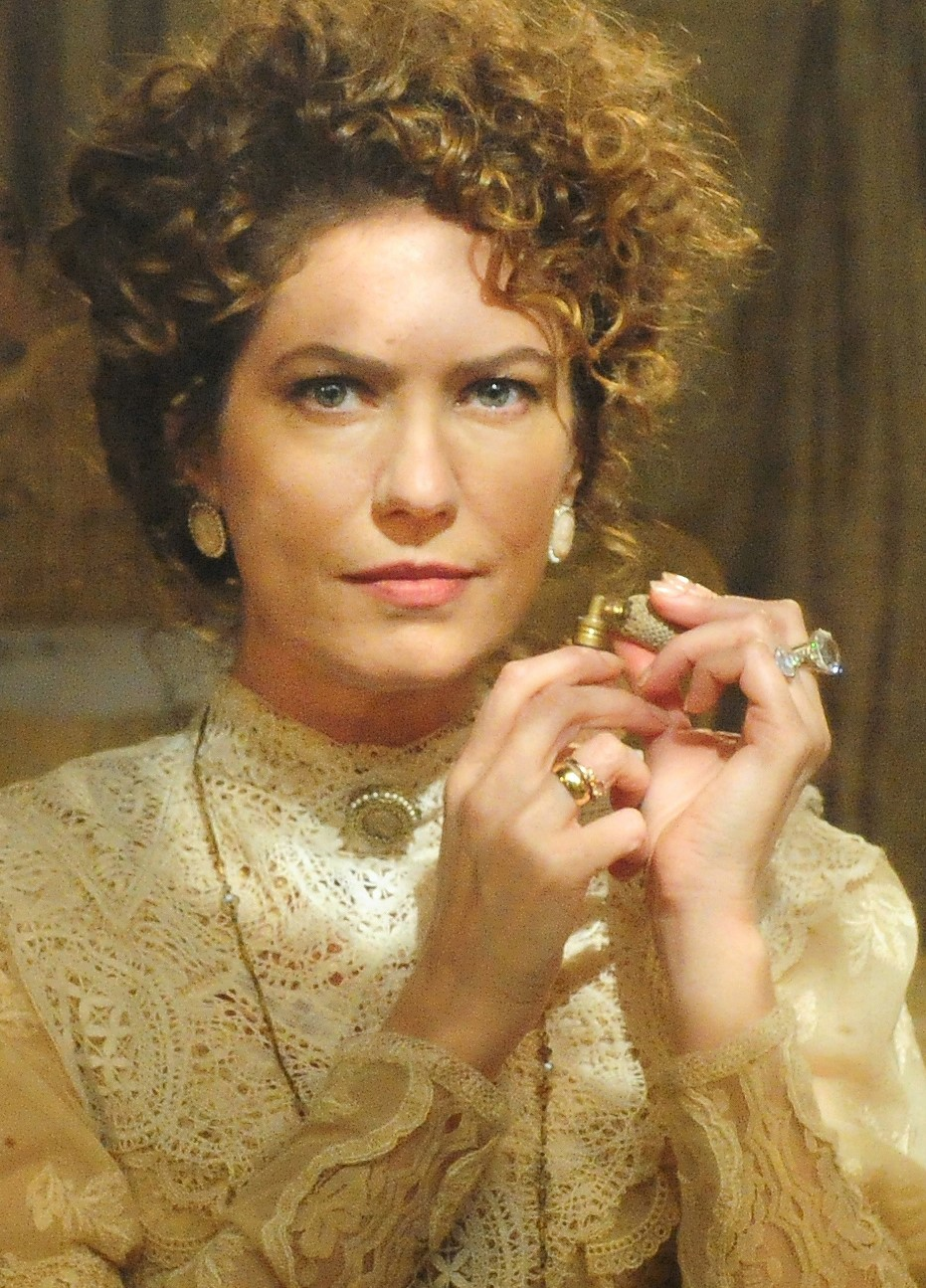
- Pillar in 2012
- Born: Patricia Gadelha Pillar; 11 January 1964 (age 62); Brasília, Federal District, Brazil
- Occupation: Actress
- Years active: 1981–present
- Spouses: Zé Renato (m. 1985; div. 1995) Ciro Gomes (m. 1999; div. 2011)
- Partner: Carlos Henrique Schroder (2016–2019)
- Parents: Nuno Pillar (father); Lucy Gadelha (mother)
- Relatives: Sandra Gadelha (cousin); Líber Gadelha (cousin); Preta Gil (cousin); Luiza Possi (cousin)

Patricia Gadelha Pillar (born 11 January 1964) is a Brazilian actress, producer, film director, screenwriter, and television presenter.

== Biography ==
Pillar was born in Brasília, Distrito Federal to Nuno Pillar and Lucy Gadelha. She was born only three months before the 1964 Brazilian coup d'état, and due to her father's occupation as a Navy officer, she lived in various places in Brazil, such as Vitória, Espírito Santo, and Santos, São Paulo, before settling in Rio de Janeiro at the age of 14.

Pillar always wanted to be an actress, so she started working while in high school in order to pay for her acting lessons.

At 16, she became a photographic model. She studied journalism but gave it up to pursue her dream of becoming an actress. She joined the theatre group Asdrúbal Trouxe o Trombone alongside Regina Casé, before getting her first film role in Para Viver um Grande Amor, alongside singer Djavan. That role granted her a part in the famous 1985 Rede Globo telenovela Roque Santeiro, created by Dias Gomes. Since then, she has starred in twelve other Globo telenovelas. She has also starred in eleven feature films, including the 1995 Academy Award-nominated O Quatrilho, alongside Glória Pires.

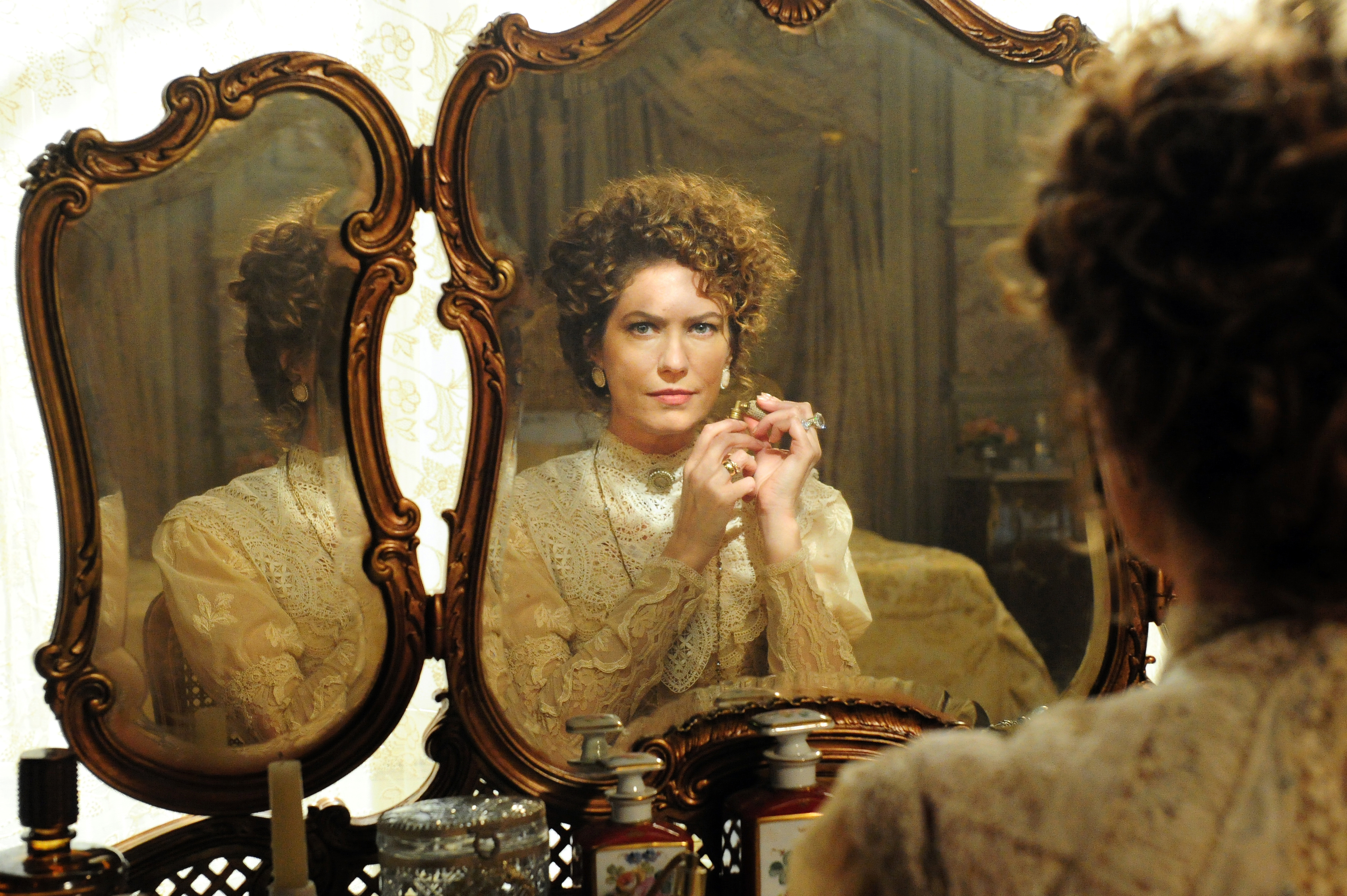
Pillar as the villain Constância Assunção in the 2012 soap opera Lado a Lado.

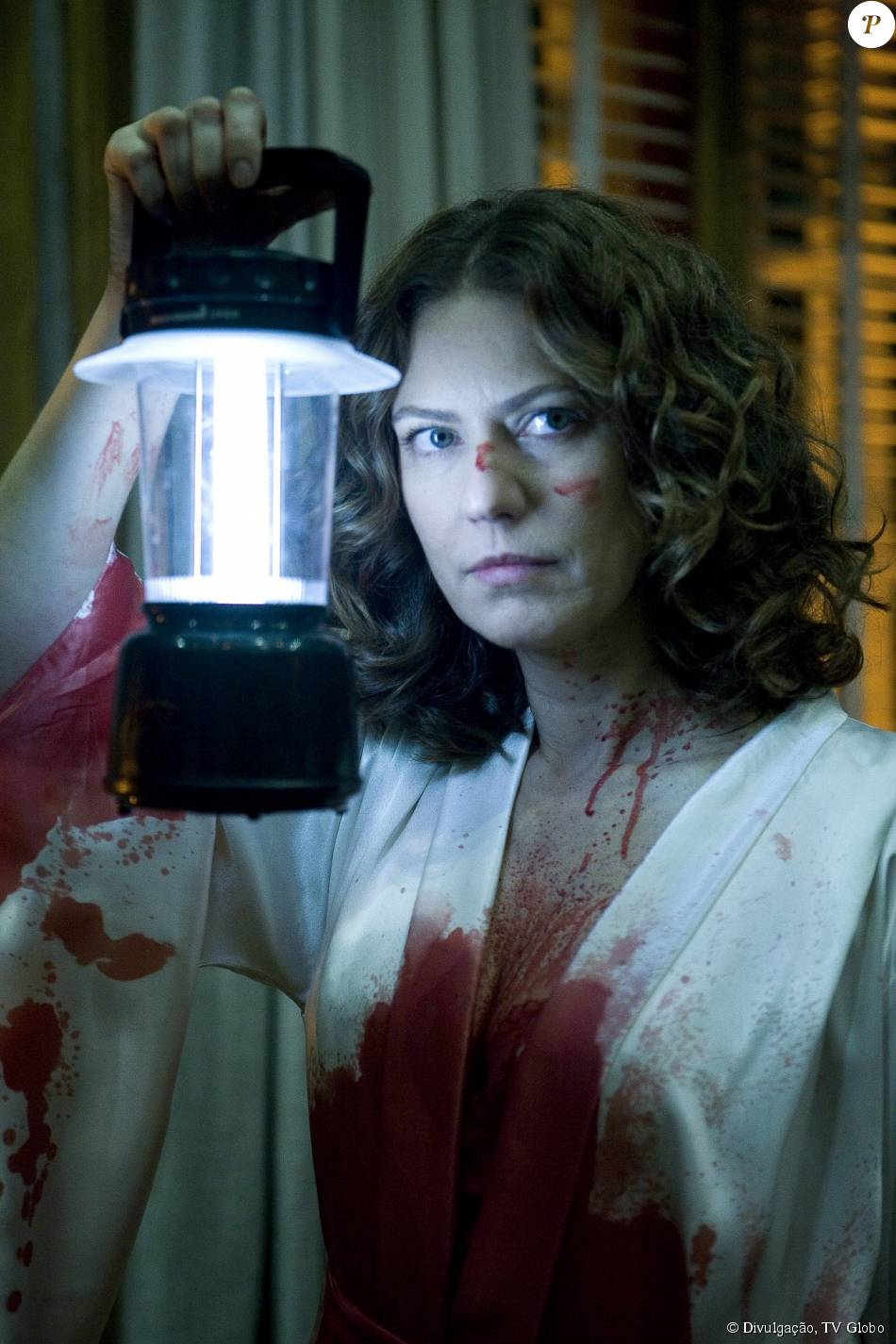
Patricia Pillar as Flora in the 2008 soap opera A Favorita.

In 2005, Pillar debuted as a director. Her first film was a documentary about the Brazilian singer Waldick Soriano and it was titled Waldick - Sempre No Meu Coração (which means, in Portuguese, Waldick - Always In My Heart).

== Personal life ==
Patrícia Pillar was married to the politician Ciro Gomes from the Brazilian Socialist Party. They started dating when Gomes was still legally married to Patrícia Saboya, then senator from Ceará, causing controversy in the media. In 2002, Pillar played an important role in Gomes' presidential campaign, although she was recovering from breast cancer. Prior to that, she was married to MPB singer-songwriter Zé Renato from 1985-95.

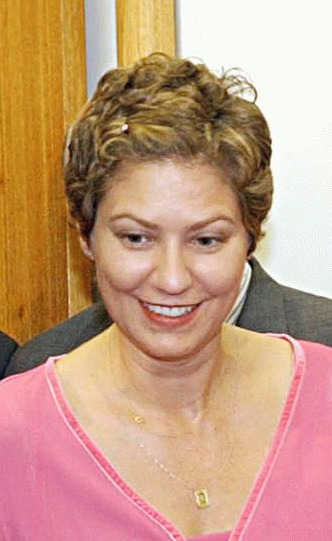
Pillar in 2003

She is a cousin of some of the most famous singers on the Brazilian music scene: Preta Gil, Moreno Veloso, Luiza Possi, Davi Moraes and Marina Lima.

== Filmography ==
=== Film ===
Year	Title	Role	Notes
1983	Para Viver um Grande Amor	Marina	
1988	Festa	Snooker Player	
1992	A Maldição do Sanpaku	Cris	
1994	Menino Maluquinho - O Filme	Mother	
1995	O Monge e a Filha do Carrasco	Amula	
1995	O Quatrilho	Teresa	
1997	O Noviço Rebelde	Maria do Céu	
1998	Love and Co	Ludovina	
2004	O Casamento de Iara	Iara	Short Subject
2005	March of the Penguins	Mother Penguin	Dubbing
2006	If I Were You	Dr. Cris	
2006	Zuzu Angel	Zuzu Angel	
2007	Pequenas Histórias	Iara	
2012	Margaret Mee and the Moonflower	Storyteller	Documentary
2015	The Duel: A Story Where Truth Is Mere Detail	Clotilde	
2017	Unicórnio	Maria's Mother	

=== Television ===
Year	Title	Network	Role	Notes
1985	FM TV	Rede Manchete	Presenter (Herself)	
1985	Roque Santeiro	Rede Globo	Linda Bastos Moreyra França	
1986	Sinhá Moça	Rede Globo	Ana do Véu	
1986	Vídeo Show	Rede Globo	Presenter (Herself)	
1987	Brega e Chique	Rede Globo	Ana Cláudia Alvaray	
1987	Armação Ilimitada	Rede Globo	Santinha de Oliveira	
1988	Vida Nova	Rede Globo	Bianca	
1990	Rainha da Sucata	Rede Globo	Alaíde	Supporting Role
1991	Salomé	Rede Globo	Salomé	Lead Role
1992	It's Your Call	Rede Globo	Ana Maria	
1992	It's Your Call	Rede Globo	Camila	
1992	As Noivas de Copacabana	Rede Globo	Cinara Alves	Supporting Role
1993	Renascer	Rede Globo	Eliana	Supporting Role
1994	Pátria Minha	Rede Globo	Ester Fonseca	Special appearance
1994	Caso Especial	Rede Globo	Esmeraldina	
1996	King of Cattle	Rede Globo	Luana	Lead Role
1998	Mulher	Rede Globo	Dr. Cris	Lead Role
2001	Um Anjo Caiu do Céu	Rede Globo	Duda	Supporting Role
2003	Carga Pesada	Rede Globo	Rosa	
2004	Cabocla	Rede Globo	Ciana	
2004	Histórias de Cama & Mesa	Rede Globo	Paula	
2005	Os Amadores	Rede Globo	Lena	
2005	A Diarista	Rede Globo	Marta	Special Participation
2005	Damas e Cavalheiros	Rede Globo	Woman	
2006	Sinhá Moça	Rede Globo	Cândida Ferreira	
2007-2013	Som Brasil	Rede Globo	Presenter (Herself)	5th Stage
2008	The Favorite	Rede Globo	Flora Pereira da Silva	Main Antagonist
2010	Passione	Rede Globo	Juliana	Special appearance
2011	Divã	Rede Globo	Suzana	
2012	The Brazilians	Rede Globo	Ludmila	
2012	Side by Side	Rede Globo	Constância	Main Antagonist
2014	Doomed	Rede Globo	Isabel Fraga Favais	Co-lead Role
2014	The Party	Rede Globo	Ângela Mahler	Antagonist
2016	Ligações Perigosas	Rede Globo	Isabel D'Avila De Alencar	Main Antagonist
2018	Onde Nascem os Fortes	Rede Globo	Cássia Ferreira da Silva	Lead Role
2020	Salve-se Quem Puder	Rede Globo	Herself	Special appearance

=== Director ===
Year	Title	Notes
2003	Saudade da Saudade	Eveline Hecker's music video
2004	Ponte Aérea	Eveline Hecker's CD idealization
2007	Waldick, Sempre no Meu Coração	Documentary
2007	Waldick Soriano: Ao Vivo	Waldick Soriano's CD and DVD
2011	Construção	Co-Production
2013	Vergonha	Marcia Castro's music video

== Plays ==
Year	Title	Role	Notes
1981	Os Banhos	Belvedonski	
1982	Jogos de Guerra	Several	
1983	Tem Pra Gente, Se Invente	Fátima	
1983	Tem Pra Gente, Se Invente	Glória	
1984	Morangos e Lunetas	Tainá	
1985	Amizade de Rua	Bianca	
1986	Estúdio Nagazaki	Yushimasa Nagashima	
1986	Estúdio Nagazaki	Diana	
1986	Estúdio Nagazaki	Afrânio	
1986	Quando Eu Olho Pros Teus Olhos Vejo Logo Meteoros	Singer	
1988	O Máximo	King Midas	
1988	O Máximo	Glória	
1989	Lobo de Ray Ban	Júlia Ferraz	
1991	Prima Roshana em Freud Levou Pau em Ginecologia	Roshana	
2004	Proof	Catherine	

== Awards ==
Year	Title	Category	Nomination	Result	Notes
1992	Prêmio Candango	Best Actress	A Maldição do Sanpaku	Won	
1992	Festival de Cinema de Natal	Best Actress	A Maldição do Sanpaku	Won	
1994	Prêmio APCA	Best Actress	A Maldição do Sanpaku	Won	
1996	Prêmio APCA	Best Supporting Actress	Menino Maluquinho - O Filme	Won	
1996	Prêmio Contigo! de TV	Best Actress	King of Cattle	Won	
1997	Press Trophy	Best Actress	King of Cattle	Nominated	
1998	Prêmio Festival de Brasília	Best Actress	Love and Co	Won	
2004	Extra Television Awards	Best Actress	Cabocla	Nominated	
2005	Prêmio Contigo! de TV	Best Actress	Cabocla	Nominated	
2006	Prêmio Qualidade Brasil	Best Cinema Actress	Zuzu Angel	Won	
2007	Prêmio Contigo! de Cinema Nacional	Best Actress	Zuzu Angel	Nominated	
2007	Grande Prêmio do Cinema Brasileiro	Best Actress	Zuzu Angel	Nominated	
2008	Festival de Paulínia	Best Documentary	Waldick, Sempre no Meu Coração	Nominated	
2008	Prêmio FestNatal	Best Film (Popular Jury)	Waldick, Sempre no Meu Coração	Won	
2008	Prêmio FestNatal	Best Actress	The Favorite	Won	
2008	Prêmio Qualidade Brasil	Best Actress	The Favorite	Won	
2008	Extra Television Awards	Best Actress	The Favorite	Won	
2008	Prêmio Quem de Televisão	Best Actress	The Favorite	Won	
2008	Prêmio Contigo! de TV	Celebrity of the Year	The Favorite	Nominated	
2008	Prêmio Editora Três	Personality of the Year	The Favorite	Won	
2008	Prêmio APCA	Best Actress	The Favorite	Won	
2008	Prêmio TV Press	Best Actress	The Favorite	Won	
2008	Prêmio IG Gente	Best Actress	The Favorite	Won	
2008	Prêmio Tudo de Bom	Best Actress	The Favorite	Nominated	
2008	Troféu Domingão Melhores do Ano	Best Actress	The Favorite	Won	
2009	Press Trophy	Best Actress	The Favorite	Won	
2009	Troféu Internet	Best Actress	The Favorite	Won	
2009	Prêmio Contigo! de TV	Best Telenovela Actress	The Favorite	Won	
2009	Meus Prêmios Nick	Favorite Actress	The Favorite	Won	
2010	Cine Ceará	Tribute	Her Career	Won	
2011	Troféu Marlin Azul	Tribute	Her Career	Won	
2013	Festival Internacional de Cinema Feminino	Tribute	Her Career	Won	
2013	Prêmio Contigo! de TV	Best Series or Miniseries Actress	The Brazilians	Nominated	
2013	Extra Television Awards	Best Supporting Actress	Side by Side	Nominated	
2014	Ordem do Mérito Cultural	Tribute	Her Contribution to Culture	Won	
2014	Prêmio Cariocas do Ano - Veja Rio	Best Actress	Doomed and O Rebu	Won	
2014	Prêmio APCA	Best Actress	Doomed and O Rebu	Won	
2014	Prêmio Quem de Televisão	Best Television Actress	O Rebu	Nominated	
2015	Prêmio Contigo! de TV	Best Actress	O Rebu	Nominated	
2016	Prêmio Quem de Televisão	Best Actress	Ligações Perigosas	Nominated	
2018	Troféu Domingão Melhores do Ano	Best Series or Miniseries Actress	Onde Nascem os Fortes	Won	
2018	Prêmio APCA	Best Actress	Onde Nascem os Fortes	Nominated	
