= Hildegard Angel =

Brazilian journalist and actress (born 1949)

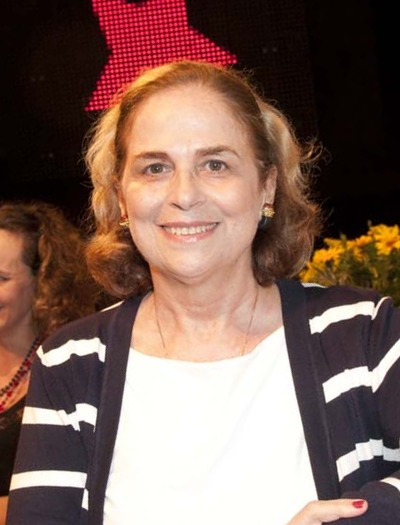
- Hildegard in 2010
- Born: Hildegard Beatriz Angel Bogossian; September 24, 1949 (age 76); Rio de Janeiro, Rio de Janeiro, Brazil
- Occupations: journalist actress
- Mother: Zuzu Angel
- Website: hildeangel.com.br

Hildegard Beatriz Angel Bogossian (September 24, 1949) is a Brazilian journalist and actress.

== Biography ==
=== Early years and education ===
Daughter of Minas Gerais fashion designer Zuzu Angel and American salesman Norman Angel Jones, Hildergard was born in Rio de Janeiro in 1949. She was born in a maternity hospital in the Laranjeiras neighborhood and lived until the age of two in Nova Iguaçu, in the Baixada Fluminense. When she was two, her parents moved to Ipanema, a noble neighborhood in Rio de Janeiro.

Married in 1943, Zuzu and Norman had three children, Stuart, Hildegard and Ana Cristina. The couple divorced in 1960. Zuzu had some sewing experience, as she sewed for a charitable cause, the Foundation of Social Pioneers, organized by Juscelino Kubitschek's wife and then first lady of Brazil, Sarah Kubitschek. After her divorce, she turned sewing into a craft.

Hildegard began working as an advertising girl for her mother Zuzu's sewing business and became interested in studying theater, influenced by her neighborhood neighbor Maria Clara Machado, who founded the Tablado Theater in Jardim Botânico and encouraged Hildegard to study theater at school.

=== Career ===
She began her theatrical career in Copacabana, in a play based on Arthur Miller's The Crucible, directed by João Bethencourt and performing with actors such as Eva Vilma, Rodolfo Mayer and Mário Lago. In 1966, she was part of the cast of Domingos de Oliveira's film Todas as Mulheres do Mundo.

In 1971, she appeared in the film, O Barão Otelo no Barato dos Bilhões by director Miguel Borges, in a fictitious musical trio called Trio Sinistro, with actors Wilson Grey and Mariano Procópio. In the same year, her brother, Stuart Angel, an economics student at the Federal University of Rio de Janeiro (UFRJ) and member of the Brazilian Communist Party (PCB) and the 8th October Revolutionary Movement (MR8), was kidnapped by the Brazilian military dictatorship, becoming one of the most notorious cases of repression.

The following year, she played Beatriz in the TV Globo soap opera Selva de Pedra in 1972, written by Janete Clair. That same year, she took part in the play Freud Explica for more than six months with Jorge Dória and Yara Cortes in cast. In 1978, she played herself in TV Globo's comedy series O Pulo do Gato. Also in 1978, she played herself in the soap opera Dancin' Days.

In 1979, she returned to the movies. In the movie based on real crime, O Caso Cláudia, by Miguel Borges, she played a doctor. The following year, she played the stepmother of Betinho, played by André de Biase, in the film Terror e Êxtase directed by Antônio Calmon.

Appeared in Marco Altberg's film Prova de Fogo in 1980, where she worked with Maitê Proença and Pedro Paulo Rangel.

In parallel with her career as a theater and film actress since the age of 17, she worked for the newspaper O Globo, considered to be the leading newspaper in Rio de Janeiro. She became one of the country's leading social columnists, becoming a reference in the Brazilian press for her coverage of Rio society. For thirty years she wrote a column in the Globo group newspaper. After leaving the newspaper O Globo, she moved to another Rio newspaper, Jornal do Brasil, where she remained active in a social column for eight years.

Over the years, with progressive positions, she began to analyze political and economic issues. A sympathizer of the Workers' Party (PT), she arranged a lunch between Dilma Rousseff and socialite Lily Marinho in 2010. In 2014, she supported Dilma against Aécio Neves. She opposed Dilma Rousseff's impeachment and declared his vote for PT candidates Fernando Haddad in 2018 and Lula in 2022 for president.

Since becoming more interested in politics, she has become a columnist for the left-wing website Brasil 247.

=== Personal life ===
She lost her brother, Stuart, to the dictatorship in 1971. Her mother, Zuzu, died in a car accident in São Conrado suspected of fraud, after Zuzu had spent more than a year denouncing the dictatorship and receiving death threats. Her body was buried in the São João Batista cemetery in Botafogo.

In 1993, she founded the Zuzu Angel Institute, in the Usina neighborhood, a non-profit organization dedicated to the promotion and training of fashion in Rio de Janeiro, with the main aim of remembering her brother and mother's fight for culture and against the dictatorship.

In the movie, Zuzu Angel, she was played by actress Regiane Alves.

In 2020, the Brazilian state was ordered to compensate Hildergard and her sister, Ana Cristina, for the murder of their mother, Zuzu, to the tune of 500 000 reais, following a decision by the Superior Court of Justice (STJ) that changed her death certificate from 'unnatural death' to “violent death, caused by the Brazilian state”.

In soccer, she supports Flamengo, but remains critical of recent episodes at the club, such as the fire in the athletes' accommodation and the approach of the board of directors to Jair Bolsonaro.

== Works ==
=== Cinema ===
Year	Film	Character
1971	O Barão Otelo no Barato dos Bilhões	Trio Sinistro component
1979	O Caso Cláudia	Doctor
1979	Terror e Êxtase	Betinho's stepmother
1980	Prova de Fogo	

=== Television ===
Year	TV	Character
1972	Selva de Pedra	Beatriz
1978	Dancin' Days	Herself
1979	O Pulo do Gato	Herself

=== Theater ===
Year	Play	Director	Theater	Ref.
1965	The Crucible	João Bethencourt	Teatro Copacabana/Teatro Ginástico	
1970	A dama do Camarote	Amir Haddad/Castro Viana	Teatro da Fonte da Saudade	
1970	Alice no País Divino-Maravilhoso	Paulo Afonso Grisolli	Teatro Casa Grande	
1971	A mãe	Claude Régy	Teatro Maison de France	
1971	Vivendo em Cima da Árvore	Raimundo Magalhães Júnior/Ziembinski	Teatro Nacional de Comédia	
1972	Freud explica	João Bethencourt	Teatro Maison de France	
1972	Gracias Señor	Zé Celso	Teatro Tereza Rachel	
1972	Marido, Matriz e Filial	Aderbal Freire Filho	Teatro Santa Rosa	
1973	A Venerável Madame Goneau	João Bethencourt	Teatro Mesbla	
1975	Bonifácio Bilhões	João Bethencourt	Teatro da Praia	
