= Margaret Mee and the Moonflower =

2012 documentary film directed by Malu De Martino

- Directed by: Malu De Martino
- Written by: Malu De Martino
- Produced by: Elisa Tolomelli
- Starring: Patrícia Pillar (Narrator)
- Music by: Artur Barreiros
- Production company: E.H. Filmes
- Distributed by: E.H. Filmes
- Release dates: October 7, 2012 (Rio Film Festival 2012); April 26, 2013 (Brazil)
- Running time: 78 minutes
- Country: Brazil
- Language: Portuguese

Margaret Mee and the Moonflower (Portuguese: Margaret Mee e a Flor da Lua) is a Brazilian documentary film directed by Malu De Martino. It premiered at the Rio Film Festival in October 2012, and was then released on April 2013. The film tells the story of the work and legacy of British botanical artist Margaret Mee, who moved to Brazil in the 1950s, at 43 years old, and produced over 400 illustrations about Brazilian flora and used her art as a tool to defend the environmentalism.
