= A Maldição do Sanpaku =

- Directed by: José Joffily
- Written by: Jorge Durán; Paulo Halm; José Joffily; Sergio Rezende
- Starring: Felipe Camargo; Patricia Pillar; Roberto Bomtempo
- Cinematography: Nonato Estrela
- Edited by: Vera Freire
- Distributed by: Sagres Filmes
- Release date: 21 December 1991 (Brazil)
- Running time: 88 minutes
- Country: Brazil
- Language: Portuguese

A Maldição do Sanpaku (also known as Sanpaku – O Olho da Ambição) is a 1991 Brazilian film directed by José Joffily. It stars Patrícia Pillar and Felipe Camargo.

== Cast ==
- Felipe Camargo as Poeta
- Patrícia Pillar as Cris
- Roberto Bomtempo as Gafanhoto
- Sérgio Britto as Velho
- Rogéria as Loura
- Paulo Barbosa as Negão
- Jonas Bloch as Bruce
- Nelson Dantas as Gold
- Carlos Gregório as Sivuca
- Anselmo Vasconcelos
- Wilson Grey

== Awards ==
1991: Gramado Film Festival

1. Best Picture (Nominee)
2. Best Supporting Actor (Roberto Bomtempo) (won)
3. Best Cinematography (Nonato Estrela) (won)
4. Best Editing (Vera Freire) (won)

1992: Festival de Brasília

1. Best Picture (won)
2. Best Actress (Patrícia Pillar) (won)
3. Best Supporting Actor (Roberto Bomtempo) (won)
4. Best Editing (Vera Freire) (won)

1994: São Paulo Association of Art Critics Awards

1. Best Actress (Patrícia Pillar) (won)
2. Best Editing (Vera Freire) (won)
