= Margaret Mee =

British botanical artist (1909–1988)

Margaret Ursula Mee
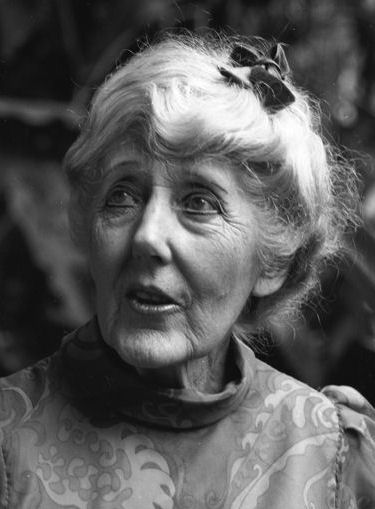
- Margaret Mee in 1988
- Born: 22 May 1909; Chesham, Buckinghamshire
- Died: 28 November 1988; Leicester
- Education: St Martin's School of Art; Camberwell School of Art
- Spouses: Reginald Bartlett (m. 1936; div. 1943) Greville Mee (m. 1980)
- Awards: 1976 MBE for services to Brazilian botany 1979 Brazilian Order of Cruzeiro do Sul; 1986 Fellowship of the Linnean Society

Margaret Ursula Mee, MBE (22 May 1909 – 30 November 1988) was a British botanical artist who specialised in plants from the Brazilian Amazon rainforest. She was also one of the first environmentalists to draw attention to the impact of large-scale mining and deforestation on the Amazon Basin.

== Early life ==
Margaret Ursula Brown was born in Whitehill, Chesham, in 1909. She attended Dr Challoner's Grammar School, Amersham, followed by The School of Art, Science and Commerce, Watford. After a short period of teaching in Liverpool she decided to travel abroad.

While in Berlin in 1933, Brown witnessed the burning of the Reichstag and subsequent Jewish boycott, which confirmed her left-wing views. During the Second World War she worked in Hatfield as a draughtswoman at the de Havilland aircraft factory.

== Personal life ==
Mee married Reginald Bruce Bartlett in January 1936. Like her husband, she became a committed trade union activist for the Union of Sign, Glass and Ticket Writers and joined the Communist Party. Mee addressed the TUC in 1937, proposing the raising of the school-leaving age and was subsequently offered, but declined, a job with Ernest Bevin. The marriage to Bartlett was not happy and, after a long separation, ended in divorce in 1943. She married Greville Mee, her second husband, in 1980.

After the war Mee studied art at St Martin's School of Art in London. In 1950 she attended the Camberwell School of Arts and Crafts, where she learnt her style of illustration, and received a national diploma in painting and design in 1950. She moved to Brazil in 1952 to teach art in the British school of São Paulo, where Greville Mee later joined her. Her first expedition was in 1956 to Belém in the Amazon Basin. She then became a botanical artist for São Paulo's Instituto de Botanica in 1958, exploring the rainforest and more specifically Amazonas state from 1964, painting the plants she saw, some new to science, as well as collecting some for later illustration. She created 400 folios of gouache illustrations, 40 sketchbooks, and 15 diaries.

Mee travelled to Washington D. C., USA, in 1964 and briefly to England in 1968 for the exhibition and publication of her book, Flowers of the Brazilian Forests. She gave a lecture in Washington D. C., USA in 1967. She returned to Brazil and joined protests to draw international attention to the deforestation of the Amazon region.

Mee travelled to London in 1988 for the publication of her book In Search of Flowers of the Amazon Forests. She gave a lecture at the Royal Geographical Society and travelled to the US to publicize the book, where she was interviewed on the MacNeil Lehrer Newshour programme, an interview which was repeated two days later following her death.

== Death ==
Mee died following a car crash in Seagrave, Leicestershire, on 30 November 1988. She was 79. In January 1989 a memorial to her life, botanical work and environmental campaigning took place in Kew Gardens.

== Recognition and honours ==
In 1976 Mee was awarded the MBE for services to Brazilian botany and a fellowship of the Linnean Society in 1986. She also received recognition in Brazil including an honorary citizenship of Rio in 1975 and the Brazilian order of Cruzeiro do Sul in 1979. In her honour, after her death the Margaret Mee Amazon Trust was founded to further education and research in Amazonian plant life and conservation. It closed in 1996 but the fellowships it provided for Brazilian botanical students and plant illustrators who wished to study in the United Kingdom continued.

In 1990 Mee was recognised for her environmental achievements by The United Nations Environment Programme (UNEP) and added to its Global 500 Roll of Honour.

In Search of Flowers of the Amazon Forests, the Diaries of botanical artist Margaret Mee written between 1956 and 1988, was published in 1988 and included an illustrated account of Mee's expeditions to the Amazonian forests, the last of which was in search of the elusive Selenicereus cacti, also known as the Amazon Moonflower, opening at night. Most of her illustrations are now part of the Kew Gardens collection.

In July 2020 a virtual exhibition of 20 of her paintings from Amazon exhibitions was shown by the Dumbarton Oaks Research Library, Washington, USA. They had been acquired by Mildred Bliss in 1966 and 1967.

== See also ==
- Margaret Mee and the Moonflower

== Selected bibliography ==
- Mee, Margaret (1968). Flowers of the Brazilian Forests. The Tryon Gallery. ISBN 978-0-902189-02-7.
- Mee, Margaret, Smith, Lyman (1969). The Bromeliads, Jewels of the Tropics. Barnes. ISBN 0-498-06887-0.
- Mee, Margaret (1988). Margaret Mee in Search of Flowers of the Amazon Forests: Diaries of an English Artist Reveal the Beauty of the Vanishing Rainforests Ed. Tony Morrison. Woodbridge: Nonesuch Expeditions. ISBN 1-869901-08-8.
- Mee, Margaret, Mayo, Simon Margaret Mee's Amazon, Royal Botanical Gardens, Kew 1988
- Mee, Margaret, Stiff, Ruth (1997). Margaret Mee: Return to the Amazon. Natural Wonders Press. ISBN 1-905377-06-1.
- Mee, Margaret (1998). Flowers of the Amazon. Pomegranate Europe Ltd. ISBN 1-56640-043-0.
- Mee, Margaret (2006). The Flowering Amazon: Margaret Mee Paintings from the Royal Botanic Gardens, Kew. Natural Wonders Press. ISBN 1-905377-06-1.
- Mee, Margaret (2006) Anos de Vida e Obra. Arte Padilla Rio de Janeiro ISBN 85-98746-02-9
