= The Man in the Black Cape =

1986 film

- Film poster
- Directed by: Sérgio Rezende
- Written by: Sérgio Rezende
- Produced by: Mariza Leão
- Starring: José Wilker; Marieta Severo
- Cinematography: César Charlone
- Edited by: Rafel Justo Valverde
- Music by: David Tygel
- Production companies: Morena Filmes; Embrafilme
- Distributed by: Embrafilme
- Release dates: April 1986 (Gramado Film Festival); 21 August 1986 (Brazil)
- Running time: 120 minutes
- Country: Brazil
- Language: Portuguese

The Man in the Black Cape (Portuguese: O Homem da Capa Preta) is a 1986 Brazilian drama film directed by Sérgio Rezende. Shot in Rio de Janeiro, it portrays the life of Tenório Cavalcanti, a Duque de Caxias politician who used to carry a machine gun dubbed "Lurdinha" with him.

== Plot ==
Born in Alagoas, Tenório settles in Baixada Fluminense, where he acquires fame as a gunfighter, due to his connections with an extermination group, and becomes involved with the political plots of the region. Violence accompanies her life: murdered father, gunshot marks on the body, a machine gun as a companion.

A man of the people, a popular politician, he built one of the most successful careers in the 1940s and 1950s. His electorate consisted of humble and miserable people, who saw him as a defender and a vigilante. With his hat on his head and the famous black cape hiding the fearsome "Lurdinha" machine gun, his rallies ravished the people and shocked the middle class and the political elite, who saw him only as a cold-hearted murderer.

He became famous for challenging corruption and the powerful who dominated the municipality of Duque de Caxias in the State of Rio de Janeiro.

In 1954, he founded the newspaper 'Luta Democrática' and received the highest number of votes for Federal Deputy in the State. Elected again in 1958, he ran for governor of the State of Guanabara two years later, losing to Carlos Lacerda. In 1962, he ran again in a majority election, now fighting for the position of governor of the State of Rio de Janeiro, losing the election to Badger da Silveira.

Despite being a staunch anticommunist, still with the mandate of Federal Deputy, he allies himself with the popular forces that support president Jango (João Goulart), who is deposed by a coup d'etat in June 1964, followed by a 21-year military dictatorship.

== Cast ==
- José Wilker as Tenório Cavalcanti
- Marieta Severo as Zina
- Jonas Bloch as Adolfo
- Paulo Villaça as Maragato
- Isolda Cresta as Tenório's Mother
- Mariana de Moraes
- Jurandir de Oliveira as Venâncio
- Jackson De Souza as Cabral
- Ligia Diniz
- Chico Díaz as Manezinho
- Alvaro Freire
- Carlos Gregório as Silas

== Reception ==
It was elected the Best Film by the jury, also receiving Best Actor (Wilker) and Best Original Score awards at the 14th Gramado Film Festival. It was entered into the 15th Moscow International Film Festival.

The movie generated some controversy when Carlos Alberto Prates Correa called the movie "fascist" and "right-wing". The distributor Manchete Vídeo launched the VHS of the movie at the same time of the premiere. Brazilian MPA's Harry Stone compared the movie with Stalone's Cobra in an attempt to criticize its violent content. There is an urban legend that dealers in Rio de Janeiro offered drugs in a package called "capa preta", in homage to the film.
