= Isolados =

2014 film directed by Tomas Portella

- Theatrical release poster
- Directed by: Tomas Portella
- Written by: Mariana Vielmond
- Starring: Bruno Gagliasso; Regiane Alves; José Wilker
- Cinematography: Gustavo Hadba
- Production company: Media Bridge
- Distributed by: Downtown Filmes
- Release date: 18 September 2014
- Country: Brazil
- Language: Portuguese
- Box office: R$5 million

Isolados is a 2014 Brazilian horror thriller film directed by Tomas Portella, starring Bruno Gagliasso, Regiane Alves and José Wilker. Shot in inner Rio de Janeiro state over three weeks. The film is the last work of actor José Wilker, who died on April 5, 2014. It premiered on August 8 at the 2014 Festival de Gramado.

== Plot ==
The film tells the story of Lauro, a young psychiatrist who fell in love with his former patient Renata. One day, they decide to travel to the mountains in search of tranquillity, without knowing that a serial killer couple lives there and are targeting women. Isolated, they will have to fight for their lives.

== Cast ==
- Bruno Gagliasso as Lauro
- Regiane Alves as Renata
- José Wilker as Dr. Fausto
- Juliana Alves as Luzia
- Orã Figueiredo as Clóvis
- Silvio Guindane as Augusto
