= Regiane Alves =

Brazilian actress

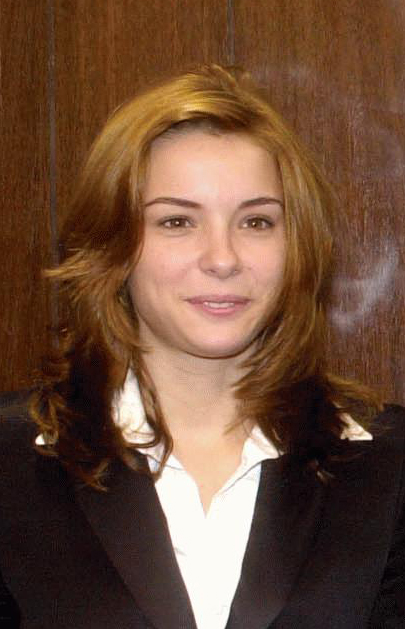
- Alves in 2003
- Born: Regiane Kelly Lima Alves; 31 August 1978 (age 47); Santo André, São Paulo, Brazil
- Occupation: Actress
- Years active: 1998–present
- Spouses: Thiago Antunes (m. 2009; div. 2010) João Gomez (m. 2012; div. 2018)
- Children: 2
- Website: http://www.regianealves.com.br

Regiane Kelly Lima Alves (born 31 August 1978) is a Brazilian actress. She is best known by her role as Dóris in TV Globo's telenovela Mulheres Apaixonadas.

== Biography ==
Born in Santo André, São Paulo metropolitan region. She is the daughter of the sales supervisor José Monteiro Alves and stay-at-home Maria Aparecida Alves Lima. From an early age became interested in the artistic career. In Children participated in poetry contests and dance festivals in college, always among the first three places.

== Personal life ==
Between 1996 and 1999 was married to Carlos Augusto Nogueira advertising, but divorced.

In 2000 she married assistant director André Felipe Binder, this marriage, but lasted until 2004, when the couple divorced.

In 2005 began a love affair with the musician Thiago Antunes and October 10, 2009, after four years together, the actress married him in Barra da Tijuca, west of the City of Rio de Janeiro. In May 2010 the actress confirmed her divorce from musician.

She was married to actor and filmmaker João Gimenez, son of Regina Duarte. On April 26, 2014, Regiane gives birth to her first son, João Gabriel, who was born through a cesarean. On August 26, 2015, she gave birth to her second son, Antônio.

== Career ==
=== Television ===
Year	Title	Role	Notes
1998	Fascinação	Ana Clara Gouveia da Silva Prates	
1998	Meu Pé de Laranja Lima	Liliane Silva (Lili)	
2000	A Muralha	Rosália Olinto	
2000	Laços de Família	Clara Lacerda Ferrari	
2001	Brava Gente	Gigi	Episode: "O Crime Imperfeito"
2001	Brava Gente	Branca Luz	Episode: "Arioswaldo e o Casamento de Sua Mãe"
2001	Sítio do Picapau Amarelo	Snow White	Season 1
2002	Desejos de Mulher	Letícia Miranda Moreno	
2003	Mulheres Apaixonadas	Dóris Duarte Martins	
2004	Cabocla	Elizabeth Pereira Junqueira Caldas (Belinha)	
2005	Retrato Falado		Episode: "Lycia"
2006	Minha Nada Mole Vida	Elizandra Peres	Episode: "Hipnose do Amor"
2006	Páginas da Vida	Alice Miranda de Vilela Arruda	
2008	Beleza Pura	Joana da Silva Amarante Medeiros	
2008	Casos e Acasos	Aline	Episode: "A Ciumenta, o Ciumento e o Ciúme"
2009	Exagerados	Bety	Special of the Fantástico
2009	A Turma do Didi	Herself	Episode: "July 12, 2009"
2010	Tempos Modernos	Goretti Cordeiro (Gô)	
2011	A Vida da Gente	Cristiane Macedo (Cris)	
2012	Guerra dos Sexos	Jennifer	Episodes: "October 27–30, 2012"
2013	Sangue Bom	Renata Moretti	
2016	A Lei do Amor	Elizabeth Alves Tavares (Beth)	Episodes: "December 2, 2016–January 10, 2017"
2017	Cidade Proibida	Marli	
2018	O Tempo Não Para	Mariacarla Borelli	
2019	Dança dos Famosos	Contestant	Season 16
2022	Além da Ilusão	Dirce	Episodes: "June 18–20, 2022"
2023	Vai na Fé	Clara Albuquerque Bastos	
2026	Três Graças	Violeta Fragoso	

=== Film ===
Year	Title	Role	Notes
2004	Onde Anda Você	Estela da Luz	
2005	Corpo	Helena	
2006	O Dono do Mar	Germana	
2006	Zuzu Angel	Hildegard Angel	
2011	Retrato Falhado	Pérola	Short film
2014	O Menino no Espelho	Odete	
2014	Isolados	Renata	
2018	Uma Pitada de Sorte	Margô	
2019	Divaldo: O Mensageiro da Paz	Jeanne des Anges	

=== Theater ===
Year	Title	Role
2002	Caminhos de José Brandão	
2005	Dança Lenta no Local do Crime	Rosie
2007	Richard III	Lady Anna
2007	Mãos ao Alto São Paulo	Flora
2008	Enfim Nós	Fernanda
2010	A Garota do Biquíni Vermelho	Sônia Mamede
2012	Festival Home Theatre	Sandra, Emilia e Isabel
2014	Amor Perverso	Amapola
2016	Para Tão Longo Amor	Raquel
