= Rogéria =

Brazilian actress

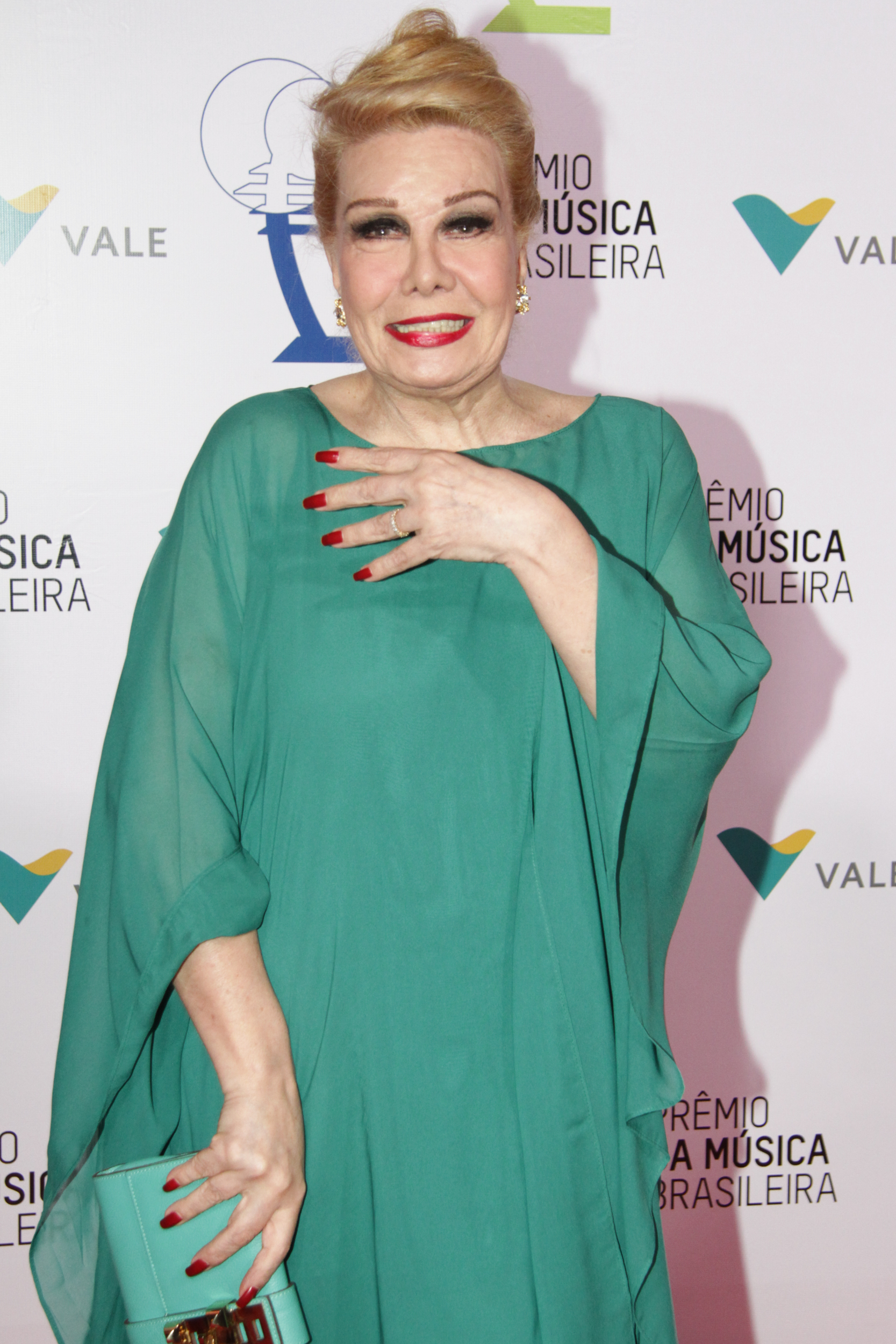
- Rogéria in June 2015
- Born: Astolfo Barroso Pinto; 25 June 1943; Cantagalo, Rio de Janeiro
- Died: 4 September 2017 (aged 74); Rio de Janeiro
- Occupations: actress, make up artist and drag queen

Rogéria (Astolfo Barroso Pinto; Cantagalo, 25 June 1943 – Rio de Janeiro, 4 September 2017) was a Brazilian actress, make up artist and drag queen, best known for her make up artist job on now-defunct TV Rio and movie roles in A Maldição do Sanpaku, Ambitious Women, and in Mulheres no Poder.

== Life ==
Rogéria was born in Cantagalo, part of Rio de Janeiro, the same town as another famous figure - as she declared, "In Cantagalo, the biggest queer (bicha) in Brazil was born – in this case, me – and the biggest male (macho) in Brazil, Euclides da Cunha". Since her childhood she was aware of her homosexuality. She left home in her teens, starting to work as a cross-dresser in nightclubs and make-up artist for celebrities.

Being a transformista and having charisma and humor, she was applauded by the public, having been a pioneer of gay rights in Brazilian television, opening doors for others. She chose not to undergo sex reassignment surgery and also did not change her baptismal name on her documents. She had lived alone in Rio de Janeiro since the 1960s.

In the 1970s she has toured Portuguese Africa (as an international debut) and Spain, then moved to France in 1973 to join the all-cross-dressing revue of Le Carrousel de Paris.

A frequent figure in Brazilian cinema, she had also participated as a judge in several variety programs, working with people such as Chacrinha and Luciano Huck.

In 2016, author Marcio Paschoal released a biography of Rogéria. The book was titled Rogéria – Uma mulher e mais um pouco.

Rogéria is depicted in the 2016 documentary film Divinas Divas, directed by Leandra Leal. She is also depicted in the 2018 documentary film Rogéria, Senhor Astolfo Barroso Pinto, directed by Pedro Gui.

Rogéria died in Rio de Janeiro, Brazil from sepsis caused by urinary tract infection on 4 September 2017 at the age of 74.
