= Zuzu Angel (film) =

2006 film directed by Sérgio Rezende

- Theatrical release poster
- Directed by: Sergio Rezende
- Written by: Marcos Bernstein; Sergio Rezende
- Produced by: Joaquim Vaz de Carvalho
- Starring: Patrícia Pillar; Daniel de Oliveira
- Cinematography: Pedro Farkas
- Edited by: Marcelo Moraes
- Music by: Cristovão Bastos
- Production companies: Globo Filmes; Toscana Audiovisual; Lereby Produções
- Distributed by: Warner Bros. Pictures
- Release date: 4 August 2006
- Running time: 1h 48min
- Country: Brazil
- Language: Portuguese

Zuzu Angel is a 2006 Brazilian biographical film based on the life of fashion designer Zuzu Angel.

== Cast ==
- Patrícia Pillar as Zuzu Angel
- Daniel de Oliveira as Stuart Angel
- Leandra Leal as Sonia
- Alexandre Borges as Fraga
- Luana Piovani as Elke Maravilha
- Aramis Trindade as Tenente
- Ângela Vieira as Lúcia
- Flavio Bauraqui as Mota
- Regiane Alves as Hildegard Angel
- Fernanda de Freitas as Ana Angel
- Othon Bastos as Brigadeiro
- Caio Junqueira as Alberto
- Nelson Dantas as Antonio Lamarca
- Paulo Betti as Carlos Lamarca
