= Rui Resende =

Brazilian actor (1938–2026)

- Born: José Pereira Rezende Filho; 18 November 1938; Araguari, Minas Gerais, Brazil
- Died: 12 July 2026 (aged 87); Rio de Janeiro, Brazil
- Occupation: Actor

José Pereira Rezende Filho (18 November 1938 – 12 July 2026) was a Brazilian actor. He was also credited as Ruy Rezende or Rui Rezende.

== Life and career ==
Rezende was born in Araguari, Minas Gerais on 18 November 1938.

He played various roles in film and on television from the 1970s to the 1990s. His most notable role was that of the teacher Astromar Junqueira in the anthology Roque Santeiro (1985) by Dias Gomes and Aguinaldo Silva.

== Death ==
Starting in 2019, he had been residing at the Retiro dos Artistas.

Rezende died in the evening of 12 July 2026, at Hospital São Francisco na Providência de Deus in the Tijuca neighborhood of Rio de Janeiro, where he had been hospitalized since 2 July for cancer treatment. He was 88.

== Personal life ==
Resende had a daughter from a previous relationship.

== Filmography ==
=== Film ===
| Year | Title | Role |
|---|---|---|
| 2014 | O Segredo dos Diamantes | Silvério |
| 2012 | E a vida continua | Desidério Serpa (Dedé) |
| 2010 | Garcia | Lobo |
| 2008 | Embodiment of Evil | Bruno |
| 2007 | O Homem que Desafiou o Diabo | Poet Moyses Sesyom |
| 2007 | A Grande Família - O Filme | Club bouncer in 1967 |
| 2006 | Noel - Poeta da Vila | Manuel de Medeiros Rosa |
| 2006 | O Veneno da Madrugada | Dentist |
| 2005 | O Amigo Dunor | Man in the bathroom |
| 2005 | Hoje Tem Felicidade | Rui Alencastro |
| 2003 | Narradores de Javé | Vado |
| 1999 | Tiradentes | Malheiros |
| 1998 | Love and Co | Alves |
| 1998 | Menino Maluquinho 2 - A Aventura | Seu Zé |
| 1989 | Kuarup | Hosana |
| 1988 | Fábula de la bella Palomera | Typographer |
| 1988 | Moon over Parador | Man on the beach |
| 1988 | Fogo e Paixão | Passenger |
| 1983 | A Difícil Viagem | Cabo |
| 1982 | Insônia | |
| 1981 | A Gostosa da Gafieira | Ruy |
| 1978 | O Escolhido de Iemanjá | Delegado Malta |
| 1977 | O Desconhecido | Miguel |
| 1977 | Barra Pesada | Tainha |
| 1976 | Dona Flor and her Two Husbands | Cazuza |
| 1976 | O Pistoleiro | Fala Fina |
| 1975 | O Casal | Melquíades |
| 1975 | Motel | |
| 1972 | O Jogo da Vida e da Morte | Reinaldo |

=== Television ===
| Year | Title | Role | Notes |
|---|---|---|---|
| 2022 | Good Morning, Verônica | Seu Tomé | Episode: "Lobo em pele de cordeiro" |
| 2021 | Um Lugar ao Sol | Napoleão Bernardino da Costa (Naná) | Episode: "14–21 de dezembro" |
| 2014 | O Caçador | Ivan Martins do Santos | Episode: "Pai Herói" |
| 2014 | Psi | Milton | Episode: "Acreditar no Além" |
| 2013 | Aventuras do Didi | São Pedro | Episode: "13 de janeiro" |
| 2012 | Preamar | Nonato | |
| 2011 | A Grande Família | Dr. Libório | Episode: "Vide Bula" |
| 2011 | Zorra Total | Passenger on Metrô Zorra Brasil | |
| 2008 | Casos e Acasos | Luiz | Episode: "A volta, a cena e as férias" |
| 2008 | A Favorita | Pereira | Episodes: "1–2 de junho" |
| 2006 | Bang Bang | Jack Label | |
| 2006 | Linha Direta | Maciel Felizardo | Episode: "O Incêndio do Gran Circo Norte-Americano" |
| 2005 | A Grande Família | Fonseca | Episode: "Seu Popozão Vale Um Milhão" |
| 2004 | Sob Nova Direção | Adamastor | Episode: "O Casamento do Meu Melhor Inimigo" |
| 2004 | Carga Pesada | Zé Carreteiro | Episode: "A Gente Chega Lá" |
| 2004 | Um Só Coração | Blaise Cendrars | |
| 2000 | Aquarela do Brasil | Gastão | |
| 1999 | Você Decide | Plínio | Episodes: "Numa Sexta-Feira 13: Parte 1 e 2" |
| 1998 | Meu Bem Querer | Elias | |
| 1998 | Mulher | Pastor César | Episode: "O Néctar da Vida" |
| 1998 | Caça Talentos | Júpiter da Silva | Season 4 |
| 1994 | Incidente em Antares | Menandro Olinda | |
| 1994 | Memorial de Maria Moura | Damião | |
| 1993 | Você Decide | | Episode: "Chofer de Táxi" |
| 1992 | As Noivas de Copacabana | Matador | |
| 1990 | A História de Ana Raio e Zé Trovão | Roberto (Bob Lamb) | |
| 1990 | O Canto das Sereias | Polifemo | |
| 1990 | Escrava Anastácia | Bexiga | |
| 1990 | Fronteiras do Desconhecido | Clarence Hurt | Episode: "Inimigos Públicos" |
| 1989 | Kananga do Japão | Jorge | |
| 1988 | Olho por Olho | Eládio | |
| 1987 | Expresso Brasil | Professor Astromar Junqueira | |
| 1986 | Hipertensão | Vítor Assunção | |
| 1985 | Roque Santeiro | Professor Astromar Junqueira | |
| 1983 | Voltei pra Você | Curió | |
| 1983 | Bandidos da Falange | Lídio, o Mendigo | |
| 1983 | Parabéns pra Você | Paixão | |
| 1982 | Paraíso | Vadinho | |
| 1981 | Obrigado, Doutor | Seu Guma | Episode: "A Santa e a Vaca" |
| 1981 | O Bem-Amado | Suicida | Episode: "Um Defunto Voluntário" |
| 1980 | Chega Mais | Zico | |
| 1979 | Sítio do Picapau Amarelo | Bicho Manjaléu | Episode: "Quem Quiser Que Conte" |
| 1979 | Carga Pesada | Romualdo, o cego | Episode: "A Explosão" |
| 1978 | Sinal de Alerta | Fumaça | |
| 1978 | Ciranda Cirandinha | Taxi driver | |
| 1978 | O Pulo do Gato | Olegário | |
| 1976 | O Casarão | Abelardo | |
| 1975 | Cuca Legal | Albano | |
| 1974 | O Espigão | Dico | |
| 1970 | Simplesmente Maria | Marcos | |
| 1970 | A Gordinha | Zequiel | |
| 1969 | João Juca Jr. | | |
| 1968 | Beto Rockfeller | Saldanha | |
| 1968 | Os Tigres | | |
| 1967 | Angústia de Amar | Chester | |
| 1967 | O Tempo e o Vento | | |
| 1967 | Meu Filho, Minha Vida | Mr. Simons | |
| 1966 | Somos Todos Irmãos | Levy | |
| 1966 | O Anjo e o Vagabundo | Jacaré | |

=== Others ===
- Série Mãos a Obra (2016): Series produced by ABCP showing the step-by-step of building of a residential building.

== Theatre ==
- 1967 – O Estranho Casal
- 1968 – A Cozinha
- 1968 – Frankenstein
- 1969 – Os Gigantes da Montanha
- 1970 – O Macaco da Vizinha
- 1970 – O Divino Imaculado
- 1973 – Sócrates
- 1974 – Tiro e Queda
- 1976 – Canção de Fogo
- 1976 – A Mulher Integral
- 1977 – Um Santo Homem
- 1977 – Fora de Jogo
- 1978 – Balaio de Gatos
- 1978 – A Fila
- 1979 – Fando e Lis
- 1979 – Nadim Nadinha Contra o Rei de Fuleiró
- 1982 – O Suicídio
- 1985 – Este Mundo É um Hospício
- 1987 – Ensaio Nº 4: Os Possessos
- 1990 – O Homem Elefante
- 2002 – Réveillon
- 2016 – Paixão Segundo Nelson
