= Nelson Dantas =

Brazilian actor (1927–2006)

- Born: Nelson Hannequim Dantas Filho; November 17, 1927; Rio de Janeiro, Brazil
- Died: March 18, 2006 (aged 78); Rio de Janeiro, Brazil
- Occupation: Actor
- Years active: 1949-2006

Nélson Dantas (November 17, 1927 – March 18, 2006) was a Brazilian actor. He began in 1949, but his peak period began in 1962. In 1981 he won an award at the Festival de Gramado.

== Partial filmography ==
- A Mulher de Longe (1949)
- Almas Adversas (1952)
- Carnaval em Caxias (1954)
- Matar ou Correr (1954)
- O Assalto ao Trem Pagador (1962) - Priest
- Pluft, o Fantasminha (1962) - Fantasma / Humano
- Capitu (1969) - Padua
- The Alienist (1970) - The Accountant
- A Casa Assassinada (1971)
- Lúcia McCartney, Uma Garota de Programa (1971) - F.A.
- O Doce Esporte do Sexo (1971)
- Os Inconfidentes (1972) - Padre
- Vai Trabalhar Vagabundo (1973)
- A Estrela Sobe (1974)
- O Casamento (1975) - Xavier
- As Aventuras de Um Detetive Português (1975) - Zelador
- Dona Flor and Her Two Husbands (1976) - Clodoaldo the Poet
- Assuntina das Amérikas (1976)
- A Noiva da Cidade (1978)
- O Bom Burguês (1979)
- Insônia (1980) - (segment "Dois Dedos")
- Cabaret Mineiro (1980)
- Engraçadinha (1981) - Dr. Pergamini
- O Santo e a Vedette (1982)
- O Homem do Pau-Brasil (1982) - Friar
- Bar Esperança (1983) - Ivan
- Blame It on Rio (1984) - Doctor
- Memoirs of Prison (1984) - Ilha Grande's Prison Warden
- O Cavalinho Azul (1984) - Vicente's Father
- Urubus e Papagaios (1985)
- Noite (1985)
- Chico Rei (1985)
- Fulaninha (1986)
- Minas-Texas (1989) - Seu Correia
- A Maldição do Sanpaku (1991) - Gold
- Tropicaliente (1994, TV Series) - Bujarrona
- Lamarca (1994) - Lamarca's father
- Four Days in September (1997) - Toledo
- Policarpo Quaresma, Herói do Brasil (1997) - Caldas
- Menino Maluquinho 2: A Aventura (1998) - Costa
- Midnight (1998) - Farmacêutico
- Amor & Cia (1998) - Asprígio
- O Viajante (1998) - Mestre Juca
- Força de um Desejo (1999, TV Series) - Dr. Xavier
- Traveller (1999) - Vice-rei
- Sonhos Tropicais (2001) - Prefeito Pereira Passos
- Desejos de Mulher (2002, TV Series) - Ubaldo
- Narradores de Javé (2003) - Vicentino
- Celebridade (2003, TV Series) - Alcir Nogueira
- Zuzu Angel (2006) - Antônio Lamarca (final film role)
