= Carlos Henrique Schroder =

Brazilian journalist and executive

- Born: January 28, 1959 (age 66); Santo Ângelo, Rio Grande do Sul, Brazil
- Occupation: CEO of TV Globo
- Spouse: Renata Salgado (m. 2008; div. 2015)
- Partner: Patricia Pillar (2016–2019)

Carlos Henrique Schroder (born January 8, 1959) is a Brazilian journalist and chief executive officer (CEO) of TV Globo.

Schroder began working at TV Globo in 1982 as a producer. He held several positions in journalism, until he was appointed director of Central Globo de Jornalismo (CGJ) in 2001 and in 2009, director-general of the Journalism and Sports department. In 2012, he took over as the company's CEO.
