= Time of Fear =

2009 film directed by Sérgio Rezende

- A poster with the film's international title: Time of Fear
- Directed by: Sérgio Rezende
- Written by: Sérgio Rezende; Patrícia Andrade
- Produced by: Laís Chamma; Joaquim Vaz de Carvalho
- Starring: Andréa Beltrão; Denise Weinberg; Lee Thalor; Bruno Perillo; Guilherme Sant'Anna; Chris Couto
- Cinematography: Uli Burtin
- Edited by: Marcelo Moraes
- Music by: Miguel Briamonte
- Production companies: Toscana Audiovisual; Globo Filmes
- Distributed by: Downtown Filmes; Sony Pictures
- Release date: October 2, 2009
- Running time: 120 minutes
- Country: Brazil
- Language: Portuguese
- Budget: R$9 million
- Box office: R$2,644,26

Time of Fear (Portuguese: Salve Geral) is a 2009 Brazilian thriller film directed and written by Sérgio Rezende. It depicts the May 2006 riots perpetuated by the Primeiro Comando da Capital (PCC) criminal organization in the state of São Paulo. The Ministry of Culture submitted it for consideration of the Academy of Motion Picture Arts and Sciences for the 82nd Best Foreign Language Film Oscar, but was not nominated. The Film won the Crystal Lens Award for Best Feature Film at the 2nd Brazilian Film Festival of London.

== Plot ==
The film portrays the fictional story of Lúcia, a widowed middle class piano teacher whose 18-year-old son Rafael is imprisoned before the riots because of his participation in a car accident which resulted in the death of a girl. While visiting her son at jail, Lúcia meets Ruiva (Redheaded), lawyer of "the Professor", leader of the PCC (referred in the movie as "The Command"). The two women soon bond, and Ruiva starts using Lúcia in tasks for the criminal organization. Lúcia needs the money so she ends up accepting the mission, putting herself in the boundary between legality and crime. Meanwhile, The Command is experiencing a turbulent internal dispute for power, while facing a common enemy: the prison system.

Salve Geral lampoons the mass media for generating panic among the population of São Paulo with its sensationalistic coverage of the riot and not revealing the real cause of the revolt, which was the degrading situation of the state prison system.

== Cast ==
- Andréa Beltrão as Lúcia
- Denise Weinberg as "Ruiva"
- Lee Taylor as Rafael
- Bruno Perillo as "the Professor"
- Guilherme Santana as Pedrão
- Chris Couto as Ângela
- Juliano Cazarré as Zé
- Taiguara Nazareth as Tirso
- Giulio Lopes as Dávila
- Michel Gomes as Xizão
- Kiko Mascarenhas as commissioner Raul
- Otávio Martins as China
- Rafael Losso as Beto
- Fábio Herford as Rubinho
- Almir Barros as Tavinho
- Celso 'Not Dead' Camargo as Diguinho
- Catarina Abdala as Female Guard
- Luciano Chirolli as Secretary
- Pascoal da Conceição as Dr. Pereira
- Fernão Lacerda as Prison guard
- Henrique Neves as DEPEN Agent
- Marizilda Dias Rosa as Tiana
- João Signorelli as "Careca"
- Neco Villa Lobos as military Police officer

== Background and production ==
Although Salve Geral's main storyline is fictional, its background story is based on actual events that took place on 2006 Mother's Day. The riots caused the deaths of several people, most of them policemen. On May 11, 2006, the state government, based on information indicating the plans of PCC to perform a series of rebellions in prisons, ordered the simultaneous transfer of 765 dangerous inmates to maximum security prisons in the state. In retaliation, the leaders of the criminal organization commanded from within the prisons, through mobile phones, simultaneous riots and attacks on law enforcement officials. The message was clear: a "horror party" was to be done in each one of the neighborhoods of São Paulo. "Salve" (literally "save" or "hail") means "attack" in the Paulistano crime dialect of Portuguese language.

Sérgio Rezende wanted to show, with his film, that not only the criminals should be blamed for the riots. "We must be aware that the state also disregards the law, that the detainees are in subhuman conditions. It's not a matter of good guys and bad guys. It is a matter of reality", he said. Rezende said that the editing process was based on the 2006 Stephen Frears film The Queen.

The film cost R$9 million reais (about 4,5 million U.S. dollars), and was mostly shot in Paulínia and Campinas, with scenes in Rio de Janeiro, Foz do Iguaçu, and Ciudad del Este. It was produced by Toscana Audiovisual and Globo Filmes and distributed by Downtown Filmes and Sony Pictures.

== Academy Award submission ==
The Secretariat of the Audiovisual, a body linked to the Ministry of Culture, submitted the film for consideration of the Academy of Motion Picture Arts and Sciences for the 2009 Best Foreign Language Film Oscar. According to Silvio Da-Rin, Secretary of Audiovisual, "basically three criteria led us to choose for this movie: its high technical and artistic quality, its high production value invested in the project and the contemporaneity of the issue discussed".

The commission which chose the Brazilian contender for the Oscar comprised Da-Rin, movie critic Carlos Alberto Mattos, producer Beto Rodrigues, researcher and professor Ivana Bentes, director Carlos Gerbase, and exhibitor Luiz Gonzaga De Luca. According to the commission, the decision was not unanimous, but consensual. The ten films analyzed were very different from each other, and the ability of Salve Geral to address both social and political levels would have been the most important factor in choosing the films.

Salve Geral disputed the Brazilian submission for the 2010 Academy Award with Besouro, Síndrome de Pinocchio – Refluxo, Jean Charles, Feliz Natal, A Festa da Menina Morta, O Menino da Porteira, Se Nada Mais Der Certo, Budapeste, and O Contador de Histórias.

According to some sources, the film, specially Andréa Beltrão's performance, was very well received by the 200 members of the Academy which saw it at its official screening for Oscar voters at the Samuel Goldwyn Theater on November 20, 2009. The five films nominated for the Academy Award for Best Foreign Language Film were to be announced on February 2, 2010. The award was handed out on March 7, 2010.

== See also ==
- List of submissions to the 82nd Academy Awards for Best Foreign Language Film
- List of Brazilian submissions for the Academy Award for Best Foreign Language Film
