= A Favorita =

Brazilian telenovela by João Emanuel Carneiro

- The logo of A Favorita.
- Genre: Telenovela; Drama; Thriller; Suspense
- Created by: João Emanuel Carneiro
- Directed by: Ricardo Waddington
- Starring: Patrícia Pillar; Cláudia Raia; Mariana Ximenes; Murilo Benício; Deborah Secco; Taís Araújo; Carmo Dalla Vecchia; Cauã Reymond; Thiago Rodrigues; José Mayer; Glória Menezes; Tarcísio Meira
- Opening theme: "Pa' Bailar" (instrumental) by Bajofondo
- Country of origin: Brazil
- Original language: Portuguese
- No. of episodes: 197; 160 (International version)

Production
- Production location: Projac
- Editors: Fabrício Ferreira; André Leite; William Alves Correia; Rosemeire Oliveira; Ghynn Paul; Edson Melo
- Camera setup: Multiple-camera setup
- Running time: 35–71 minutes
- Production company: Central Globo de Produção

Original release
- Network: Rede Globo
- Release: 2 June 2008 – 16 January 2009

A Favorita (English: The Favorite) is a Brazilian telenovela produced and broadcast TV Globo. It premiered 2 June 2008 to 17 January 2009 with a total number of episodes of 197. It is created by João Emanuel Carneiro and directed by Ricardo Waddington. It is also the first telenovela by the writer to air in the 9 pm timeslot.

A Favorita storylines examine two friends, Donatela and Flora, who became rivals. One of them committed a crime and is lying, so there are two versions of the same story.

The telenovela was originally screened as six episodes per week, from Monday to Saturday, with an average running time of one hour. A Favorita has remained significant in terms of Rede Globo's success and audience share, and also in Brazilian television drama history, tackling many controversial and taboo issues previously unseen on mainstream television in Brazil.

It made history for being the first telenovela where the public did not know who was the villain and who was telling the truth.

Cláudia Raia, Patrícia Pillar, Murilo Benício, Mariana Ximenes, Lília Cabral, Taís Araújo, Deborah Secco, Carmo Dalla Vecchia, Glória Menezes, Mauro Mendonça and Tarcísio Meira in the leading roles.

In August 2014, Globo Marcas released an edited version of the telenovela in DVD format.

== Plot ==
Donatela and Flora, two friends who became rivals. One of them committed a homicide and pretends to be innocent. There are two versions for the same story. Who, after all, is telling the truth? Donatela or Flora?

Donatela and Flora grew up together. Donatela lost her parents in an accident and ended up being adopted by Flora's family. By the time they were children, the two girls were best friends to the point of starting a country band, “Faísca e Espoleta” (Flash and Fusee). The partnership made a reasonable success at the time, but the career was interrupted after they met friends Marcelo and Dodi, to whom they became engaged. Donatela married Marcelo, Gonçalo Fontini's son, heir of a paper and cellulose corporation, while Flora married Dodi, an unscrupulous man who worked for his friend's father.

However, Donatela and Marcelo's happiness didn't last too long. The couple's first son, Matheus, was kidnapped when he was six months old, never to appear again. Since then the couple started to argue very often. In the meantime, Flora and Dodi split up and she had an affair with Marcelo. She gave birth to Lara, daughter to Marcelo, harming even more his relationship with Donatela and mostly the relationship between the two friends.

In the worst period of the crisis between Donatela and Flora, Marcelo was murdered. He was shot three times with a gun that, according to witnesses, was in Flora's possession. She was arrested and sent to jail for eighteen years. Donatela, despite not forgiving Flora for the treason and for killing the love of her life, raised Lara with the love of a true mother.

Eighteen years later, after being released from prison, Flora starts trying to prove her innocence, blaming Donatela for the crime she has already paid for. Donatela fears that Flora may want to take her beloved daughter Lara away. Lara becomes the target of the dispute between the two women, who were once friends. While Flora tries to get her daughter back, Donatela will do everything she can to stop her.

== Cast ==
Actor	Character
Patrícia Pillar	Flora Pereira da Silva; Main Villain (Ends up in jail under a 40-year sentence for all her crimes)
Cláudia Raia	Donatela Pinto Fontini
Murilo Benício	Dodi (Eduardo Gentil); Villain (Killed by Flora)
Mariana Ximenes	Lara Pereira Fontini
Deborah Secco	Maria do Céu Ferreira / Pâmela Queiroz
Taís Araújo	Alícia Rosa
Carmo Dalla Vecchia	Zé Bob (José Roberto Duarte)
Cauã Reymond	Halley Gonzaga da Silva / Mateus Fontini
Thiago Rodrigues	Cassiano Copola Mendonça
José Mayer	Augusto César
Glória Menezes	Irene Fontini
Tarcísio Meira	Copola
Ângela Vieira	Arlete Salvador
Christine Fernandes	Rita Porto
Chico Diaz	Átila Mendonça
Lília Cabral	Catarina Copola Monteiro
Giulia Gam	Diva Palhares (Rosana Costa/Kato/Miranda)
Ary Fontoura	Silveirinha (Francisco Silveira)
Mauro Mendonça	Gonçalo Fontini; (Killed by Flora)
Milton Gonçalves	Romildo Rosa
Cláudia Ohana	Cida Copola (Maria Aparecida Marelo Copola)
Elizângela	Cilene (Jucilene Maria Gonzaga)
Genézio de Barros	Pedro Pereira da Silva
Iran Malfitano	Orlandinho (Orlando Queiroz)
Leonardo Medeiros	Elias Filho
Mário Gomes	Gurgel (Francisco Gurgel)
Paula Burlamaqui	Stela
Suzana Faini	Iolanda Marelo Copola
Rosi Campos	Tuca (Tereza)
Alexandre Schumacher	Norton
Aramis Trindade	Clemente
Malvino Salvador	Damião Salvador Rosa
Bel Kutner	Amelinha (Amélia Mendonça Gurgel)
Emanuelle Araújo	Manu (Manuela Ferreira)
Clarice Falcão	Mariana Copola Monteiro
Fabrício Boliveira	Didu (Eduardo Rosa)
Helena Ranaldi	Dedina
Gisele Fróes	Lorena Copola Mendonça
Giovanna Ewbank	Sharon (Maria do Perpétuo Socorro)
Graziella Schmidtt	Tina
Jackson Antunes	Leonardo Monteiro (Léo); Villain (Ends in jail)
Jean Pierre Noher	Pepe Molinos
Miguel Rômulo	Shiva Lênin Costa
Rui Resende	Pereira
Selma Egrei	Dulce Porto
Raquel Galvão	Melissa
Ana Roberta Gualda	Greice Ferreira da Silva
Thiaré Maia	Luma
Alexandre Nero	Vanderlei
Luiz Bacelli
Darcy Queiroz
Cleide Queiroz	Antônia
Eduardo Mello	Domênico Copola Monteiro
Hanna Romanazzi	Camila Porto
Renan Mayer	Tiago Mendonça Gurgel
Sofia Terra	Carolina Mendonça Gurgel

=== Guest stars ===
Juliana Paes	Maíra Carvalho; (Killed by Flora)
Walmor Chagas	Dr. Salvatore; (Killed by Flora)
Flávio Tolezani	Marcelo Fontini (Killed by Flora)
Nelson Xavier	Edivaldo Ferreira da Silva
Suely Franco	Geralda Queiroz
Faustão	Himself

== Soundtracks ==
A Favorita has released three official soundtrack albums: one composed mostly of Brazilian songs (Nacional - "national" soundtrack), one mostly of international songs (Internacional), and a third one, with sertanejo music (a kind of Brazilian country music).

- Nacional soundtrack
1. "É o Que Me Interessa" - Lenine (Flora's theme)
2. "Amado" - Vanessa da Mata (Lara and Cassiano's / Lara and Halley's theme)
3. "Sou Dela" - Nando Reis (Lara's theme)
4. "Não Vou Me Adaptar" - - Arnaldo Antunes and Nando Reis (Didu's theme)
5. "Quantas Vidas Você Tem?" - Paulinho Moska (Rita and Didu's theme)
6. "Fala" - Ritchie (Augusto César's theme)
7. "Tudo Passa" - Túlio Dek (Halley's theme)
8. "Pa' Bailar" - Bajofondo (opening theme)
9. "Mulher Sem Razão" - Adriana Calcanhotto (Donatela and Zé Bob's theme)
10. "Morena dos Olhos d'água" - Chico Buarque
11. "O Tempo Vai Apagar" - Zé Renato (Rita's theme)
12. "Me Abrace (Abrázame)" - Camila & Wanessa Camargo (Stela's theme)
- Internacional soundtrack
1. "Viva La Vida" - Coldplay (general theme)
2. "Bottle It Up" - Sara Bareilles (Dedina and Damião's theme)
3. "I'm Yours" - Jason Mraz (Cassiano's theme)
4. "Carry You Home" - James Blunt (Augusto César's theme)
5. "Love is Noise" - The Verve
6. "That's Not My Name" - The Ting Tings (Alícia's theme)
7. "Blame" - Tiago Iorc (Halley's theme)
8. "Fidelity" - Regina Spektor (Lara's theme)
9. "Sweet About Me" - Gabriella Cilmi
10. "No Substitute Love" - Estelle (location theme)
11. "Baby When the Light" - David Guetta (Orlandinho's theme / nightclub theme)
12. "Pumpkin Soup" - Kate Nash (location theme)
13. "Young Folks" - Peter Bjorn and John

== Impact ==
=== Ratings ===
Timeslot	# Ep.	Premiere		Finale		Rank	Season	Rating average
Timeslot	# Ep.	Date	Premiere Rating	Date	Finale Rating	Rank	Season	Rating average
Mondays—Saturdays; 8:45pm	197	2 June 2008	35	16 January 2009	52	#1	2008-09	40

In his first chapter, A Favorita recorded 35 points and 49% share, with the worst debut of a 8PM telenovela to date. These ratings are low due to the good performance of the final chapter of Caminhos do Coração, displayed simultaneously.

The ratings varied greatly over the weeks, until in Chapter 56, the telenovela recorded his record: 46 points and 65% share. Lowest audience was recorded on New Year's Eve: 25 points with a peak of 32.

In the final chapters, showed better performance: 52 points/76% share in the penultimate chapter; and 52 points/69.4% share in the last chapter, being the most watched broadcasts of recent years in Brazilian television.

== Awards ==
Year	Award	Category	Recipient
2008	Prêmio Qualidade Brasil	Best Telenovela	A Favorita
2008	Prêmio Qualidade Brasil	Best Writer	João Emanuel Carneiro
2008	Prêmio Qualidade Brasil	Best director	Ricardo Waddington
2008	Prêmio Qualidade Brasil	Best Actress	Patrícia Pillar
2008	Prêmio Qualidade Brasil	Best Supporting Actress	Lília Cabral
2008	Troféu Raça Negra	Best Actor	Milton Gonçalves
2008	Troféu Raça Negra	Best Supporting Actor	Fabrício Boliveira
2008	Prêmio Extra de Televisão de 2008	Best Telenovela	A Favorita
2008	Prêmio Extra de Televisão de 2008	Best Actress	Patrícia Pillar
2008	Prêmio Extra de Televisão de 2008	Best Supporting Actor	Cauã Reymond
2008	Prêmio Extra de Televisão de 2008	Best Child Actor/Actress	Eduardo Mello
2008	Prêmio Extra de Televisão de 2008	Best Theme Song	"Amado" (Vanessa da Mata)
2008	18º Prêmio FestNatal — Os Favoritos do Público	Best Actress	Patrícia Pillar
2008	Prêmio APCA	Best Author	João Emanuel Carneiro
2008	Prêmio APCA	Best Actress	Patrícia Pillar
2008	Prêmio QUEM Acontece 2008	Best Author	João Emanuel Carneiro
2008	Prêmio QUEM Acontece 2008	Best Actress	Patrícia Pillar
2008	ISTOÉ Gente — Personalidade do Ano	Personality of Year	Patrícia Pillar
2008	Prêmio UOL e PopTevê de Televisão	Best Telenovela	A Favorita
2008	Prêmio UOL e PopTevê de Televisão	Best Actor	Murilo Benício
2008	Prêmio UOL e PopTevê de Televisão	Best Actress	Patrícia Pillar
2008	Prêmio UOL e PopTevê de Televisão	Best Newcomer	Miguel Rômulo
2008	Prêmio TV Press	Best Actress	Patrícia Pillar
2008	Melhores do Ano 2008 — Domingão do Faustão	Best Actress	Patrícia Pillar
2008	Melhores do Ano 2008 — Domingão do Faustão	Best Actor	Murilo Benício
2008	Melhores do Ano 2008 — Domingão do Faustão	Best Supporting Actor	Cauã Reymond
2008	Melhores do Ano 2008 — Domingão do Faustão	Best Newcomer	Miguel Rômulo
2009	Prêmio IG Gente	Novela imperdível	A Favorita
2009	Prêmio IG Gente	Brilliant Actress	Patrícia Pillar
2009	Prêmio Minha Novela	Best Telenovela	A Favorita
2009	Prêmio Minha Novela	Best Actress	Patrícia Pillar
2009	Prêmio Minha Novela	Best Actor	Murilo Benício
2009	Prêmio Minha Novela	Best Supporting Actor	Ary Fontoura
2009	Prêmio Minha Novela	Best Villain	Patrícia Pillar
2009	Prêmio Minha Novela	Cena de novela do ano	Murder of Gonçalo Fontini
2009	Prêmio Faz Diferença — Jornal O Globo	Revista da TV	João Emanuel Carneiro
2009	Troféu Imprensa	Best Telenovela	A Favorita
2009	Troféu Imprensa	Best Actress	Patrícia Pillar
2009	Troféu Imprensa	Best Actor	Cauã Reymond and Murilo Benício
2009	Prêmio Contigo	Best Newcomer	Alexandre Nero
2009	Prêmio Contigo	Best Actress	Patrícia Pillar
2009	Prêmio Contigo	Best Actor	Cauã Reymond
2009	Prêmio Contigo	Best Director	Ricardo Waddington
2009	Prêmio Contigo	Best Author	João Emanuel Carneiro
2009	Prêmio Contigo	Best Telenovela	A Favorita
2009	Prêmio Contigo	Best Supporting Actor	Ary Fontoura
2009	Prêmio Contigo	Best Child Actor	Eduardo Mello

Preceded by Duas Caras (2007-2008)	A Favorita; June 2, 2008—January 17, 2009	Succeeded by Caminho das Índias (2009)
