= Sérgio Rezende =

Brazilian filmmaker (born 1951)

- Born: April 9, 1951 (age 75); Rio de Janeiro, Brazil
- Occupation: Director
- Years active: 1980-presents

Sérgio Rezende (born April 9, 1951) is a Brazilian filmmaker. He was born in Rio de Janeiro, and is best known for directing several biographical films, such as Lamarca, Mauá - O Imperador e o Rei, and Zuzu Angel, about guerrilla leader Carlos Lamarca, entrepreneur Irineu Evangelista de Sousa, and stylist Zuzu Angel Jones, who embarked on a frantic search for her son Stuart's body. His most recent release, Salve Geral, was submitted by the Ministry of Culture for consideration of the Academy of Motion Picture Arts and Sciences for the 82nd Best Foreign Language Film Oscar. It was not nominated for the award. His 1987 film The Man in the Black Cape was entered into the 15th Moscow International Film Festival.

== Filmography ==
- 2009 – Salve Geral
- 2006 – ⁣Zuzu Angel
- 2004 – Onde Anda Você
- 2000 – Quase nada
- 1999 – Mauá - O imperador e o rei
- 1997 – Guerra de Canudos
- 1994 – Lamarca
- 1989 – Doida demais
- 1987 – ⁣O homem da capa preta
- 1982 – O sonho não acabou
- 1980 – Até a última gota
