= Usina =

Region of Rio de Janeiro

Coordinates: 22°56′37″S 43°15′34″W

Usina is a region of Rio de Janeiro, but not officially recognized as a neighborhood.
