= Zuzu Angel =

Brazilian fashion designer

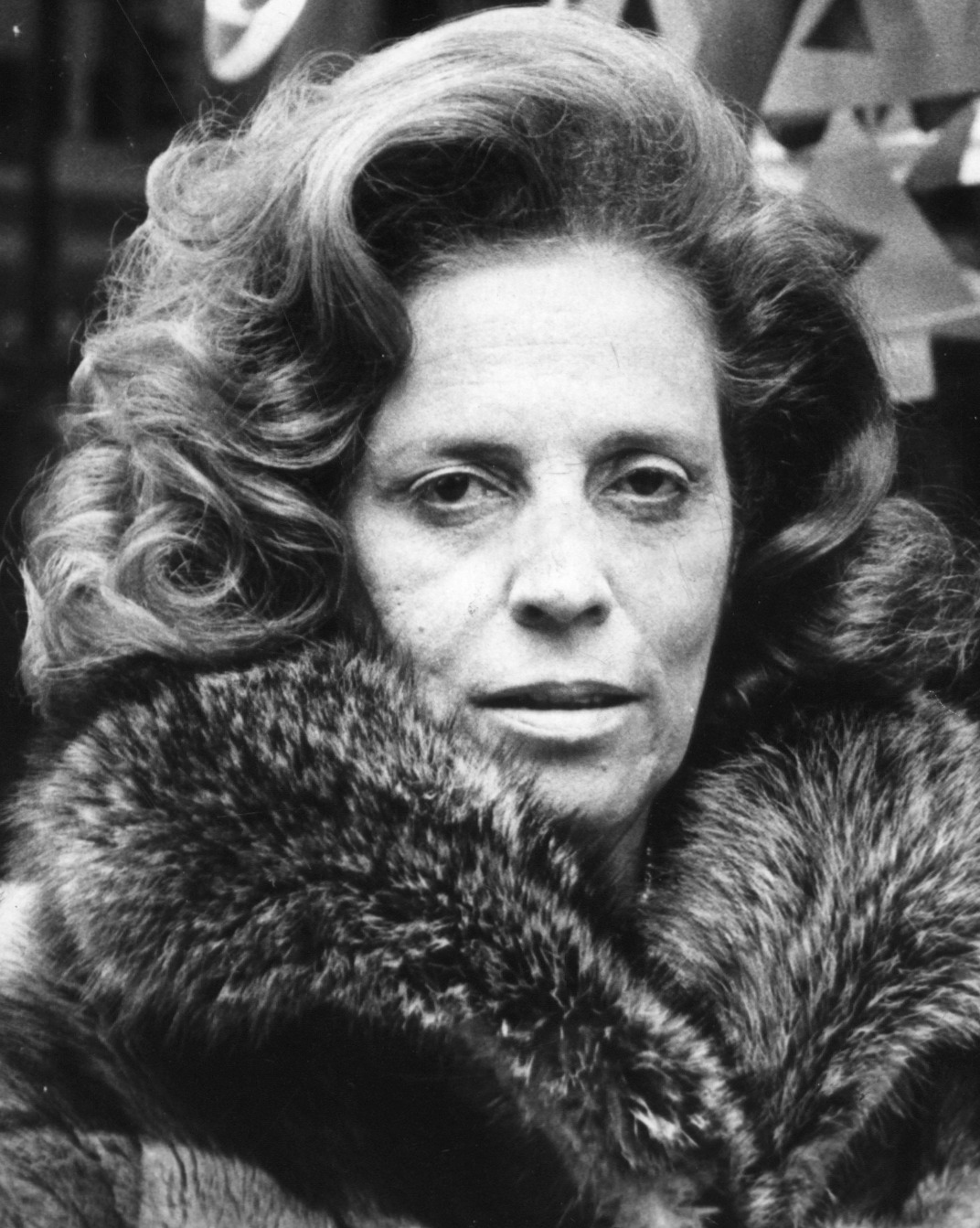
- Born: June 5, 1921; Curvelo, Minas Gerais, Brazil
- Died: April 5, 1976 (aged 54); Rio de Janeiro, Brazil
- Cause of death: Car crash (possibly murdered)
- Occupation: Fashion designer
- Spouse: Norman Angel Jones
- Children: Stuart Angel Jones; Hildegard Angel

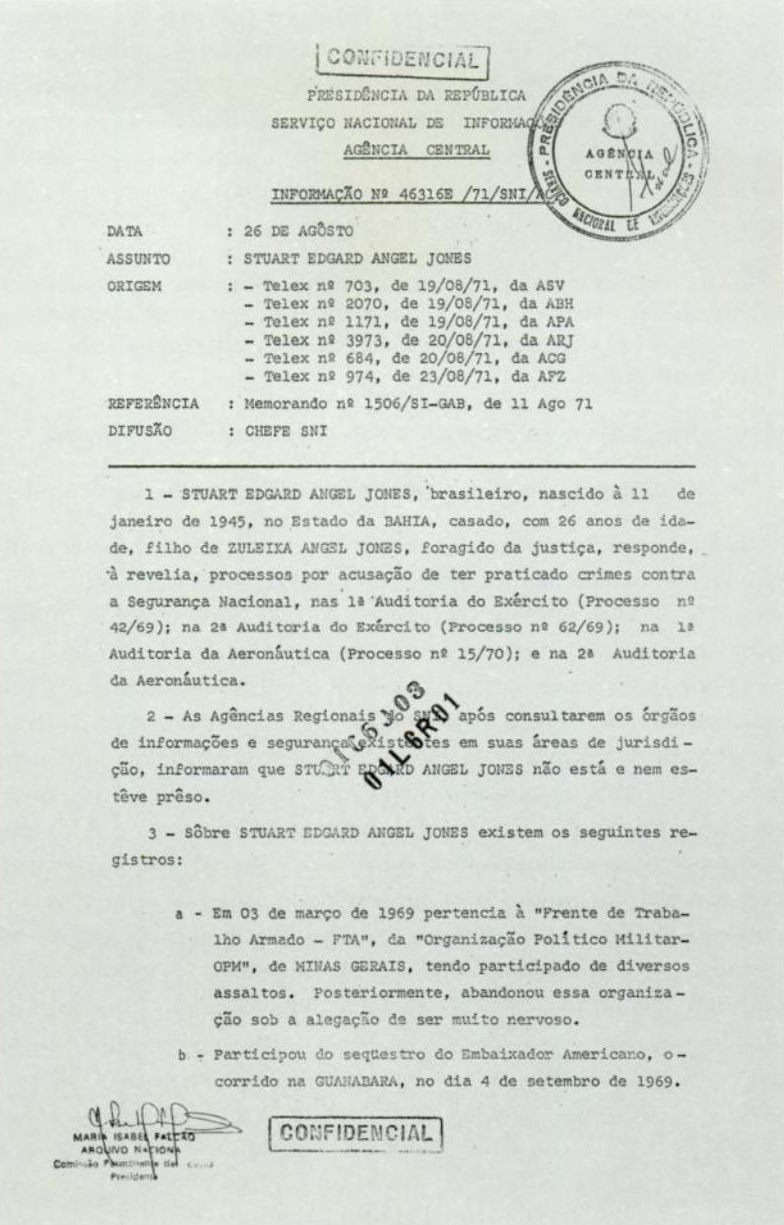
SNI document on Stuart, 1971

Zuleika Angel Jones (June 5, 1921 – April 14, 1976), better known as Zuzu Angel, was a Brazilian fashion designer, who became famous for opposing the Brazilian military dictatorship after the forced disappearance of her son, Stuart. She was also the mother of journalist Hildegard Angel.

In 2014, when the National Truth Commission was created to gather and review information about crimes committed during the years of the CIA and U.S. government-backed Brazilian military dictatorship, a former agent of the military repression named Cláudio Antônio Guerra confirmed the participation of agents of the security apparatus in the death of Angel.

== Life and career ==
Zuzu Angel was born on June 5, 1921, in Curvelo, Brazil. While still a child, she moved to Belo Horizonte, later living in Bahia. Bahian culture and colors significantly influenced the style of Angel's creations. In 1947, she went to live in Rio de Janeiro, then Brazil's capital city.

In the 1950s, Angel began her work as a seamstress, usually making clothing for close relatives. At the start of the 1970s, she opened up a store in Ipanema, at the same time beginning to exhibit her clothes on American catwalks. In her fashion expositions, she always harnessed the joy and richness of the colours of Brazilian culture, making a name for herself in the fashion world of her time.

Angel married an American salesman, Norman Angel Jones, and on January 11, 1946, they had three children, Hildegard, Ana Cristina and a son, Stuart.

== Forced disappearance of Stuart Angel ==
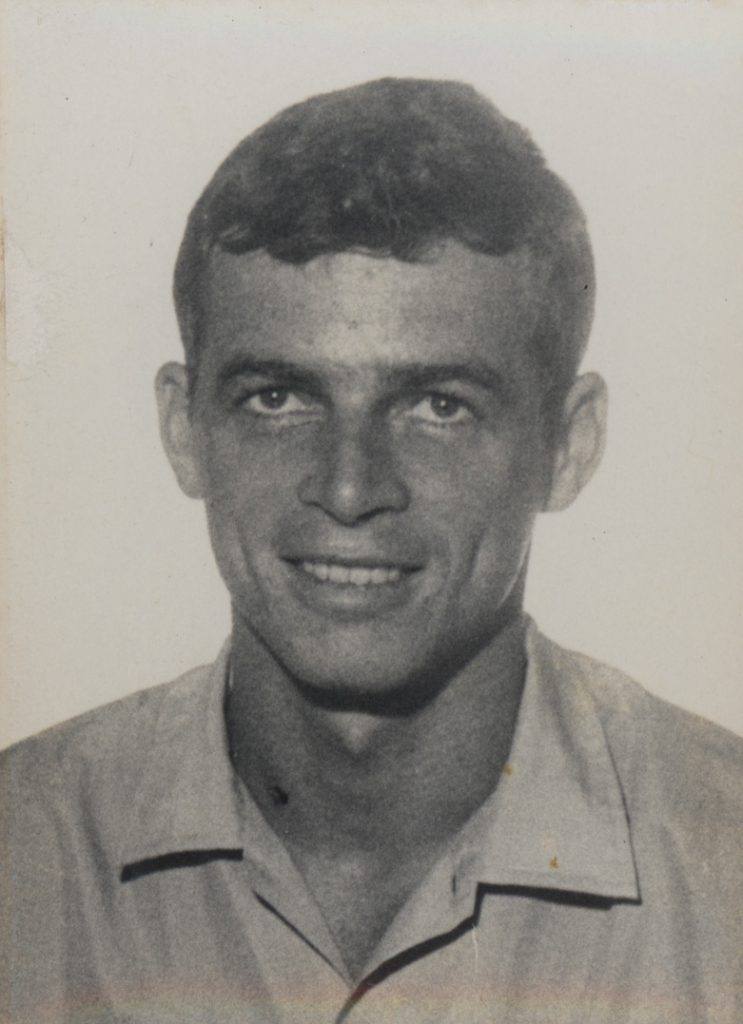
Stuart Angel

Stuart Angel was an undergraduate student at Federal University of Rio de Janeiro's School of Economics when he joined the left-wing urban guerrilla group Revolutionary Movement 8th October (Movimento Revolucionário 8 de Outubro – MR-8). He was known by his fellow guerrillas by the codenames "Paulo" and "Henrique". He married fellow militant Sônia Maria Morais Angel Jones, who later died in the custody of the military dictatorship's political police.

Stuart was arrested in the neighborhood of Grajaú, Rio de Janeiro, near Av. 28 de Setembro, around 9 a.m. on June 14, 1971, by officers of the Air Force Information Center (Centro de Informações da Aeronáutica – CISA). He was then taken under custody to CISA headquarters, where he was reportedly tortured. According to political prisoner Alex Polari, who claimed to have witnessed the incident, Stuart was then tied to the back of a jeep with his mouth glued to the vehicle's exhaust pipe and dragged through the courtyard of the Air Force base, resulting in his death by asphyxiation and carbon monoxide poisoning. His body was never found.

=== Aftermath ===
Alex Polari wrote a letter to Zuzu Angel explaining the circumstances of her son's death. Based on Polari's letter and other evidence, Angel reported the murder to Ted Kennedy, who revealed the case during a speech at the United States Senate. Angel also handed to then Secretary of State of the United States, Henry Kissinger, a letter she wrote herself, a translation of Polari's letter, and a copy of the twentieth volume of the book History of the Brazilian Republic by Hélio Silva, in which Stuart's death is discussed. According to Silva, among the reactions of the regime to the protests of the American-Brazilian community were the removal and subsequent retirement of Brigadier João Paulo Burnier, who Polari accused of being responsible for Stuart's death, and the dismissal of then Minister of the Air Force, Márcio de Sousa Melo.

== Death ==
Zuzu Angel was killed in a car crash on April 14, 1976. The suddenness of her death raised suspicions of further government involvement; the case was investigated by the Comissão de Mortos e Desaparecidos Políticos (Commission on Political Deaths and Disappearances, CMDP), under process number 237/96, who found many reasons to doubt the official version of events.

In 2014, the involvement of agents of the military repression regime in Brazil in her death was confirmed. A former agent named Cláudio Antônio Guerra, wrote the book Memories of a Dirty War, in which he details several crimes in which he either participated or knew of, revealing incriminating details about the Riocentro May Day Attack, the death of Zuzu Angel, and others.

Guerra, who was director of the Department of Political and Social Order, known as DOPS, a department notorious for its practice of torture, extrajudicial killings and forced disappearance, pointed out to the Commission that Army Colonel Freddie Perdigão, an infamous torturer and state agent of repression, was startlingly present at the scene as the accident happened. In a photo taken at the scene of the accident that killed Zuzu, Freddie Perdigão is seen close to the car, as if a passer-by. The photo had been taken on April 14, 1976, and was published by the press, but Perdigão's identity and significance were not connected to the case until Guerra identified him to the members of the Commission.

== Homages and cultural references ==
Stuart Angel is the patron of Juventude Revolucionária 8 de Outubro, MR-8's youth branch. MR-8 is now a faction of the Brazilian Democratic Movement.

Stuart's probable death by asphyxiation and carbon monoxide poisoning was referred in the lyrics of the song "Cálice", written by Chico Buarque and Gilberto Gil. In homage to Zuzu Angel, and other mothers who were unable to bury their children, Buarque wrote the song "Angélica" in 1977.

In 2006, the events surrounding Stuart's death were dramatised in the film Zuzu Angel, directed by Sérgio Rezende. The movie, in which Daniel de Oliveira plays Stuart, is about Zuzu's struggle to find out the truth of her son's death.

The Tunnel Dois Irmãos, which connects Gávea to São Conrado, the same place where Zuzu's car crashed, was renamed after her.

In 2015, Angel was commemorated on her 94th birthday with a Google Doodle featuring a motif adapted from the prints she used in her designs.
