= Contigo! =

- Editor: Editora Abril (1963-2015); Editora Caras (2015-2018); Editora Perfil (2018-present)
- Categories: Celebrity news, television and novela news
- Frequency: Monthly
- First issue: 2 October 1963
- Country: Brazil
- Language: Portuguese

Contigo! is a Brazilian website specializing in celebrity news, television, and novelas. It is managed by Editora Perfil. Between 2 October 1963 and 7 December 2018, it was also a published magazine with nations circulation. Since 2019, a spinoff of the magazine is published weekly under the name CONTIGO! Novelas, available on digital platforms and which is given to television productions.

== History ==
Contigo! was the fifth magazine launched by Editora Abril, after Capricho (1952), Manequim (1959), Quatro Rodas (1960), and Claudia (1961). At the time of its release, it was a monthly production and was mainly dedicated to photo comics. Four months after, it began increasing its features, as well as including celebrity news into its coverage. They primarily focused on big names in film, particularly movie stars outside of Brazil, with covers with straightforward images taken by paparazzi. With controversial angles and profiles, none of the covers were from photos made in studio or those that were produced. In March 2004, Contigo! underwent a massive editorial and graphic change, shifting its focus to entertainment journalism.

Contigo! often reports on celebrity news and has as a direct competitor in Quem, published by Editora Globo. When it was published, Contigo! was the leading magazine in circulation in stores and second in total circulation (including subscribers), only behind Caras. In November 2017, the magazine changed its circulation from weekly to monthly.

In 2004, the magazine won the Caboré Award (in the Veículo Impresso category, competing with Quem and Zero Hora), the Marketing Best award (in the Veículo Impresso category), and the Advertising and Marketing magazine award (in the Celebrities category).

The magazine had 193,000 copies in circulation every week, with its largest demographic being women (82%). The largest percentage in terms of age demographics was in the 25-34 range, primarily with middle and upper-class women.

In 2015, Contigo! was sold to Editora Caras along with 6 other publications from Editora Abril.

On 7 December 2018, the magazine closed after 2210 editions due to the drop in the number of subscribers. Notable members of the staff at Contigo! included Walcyr Carrasco, Silvio Santos Miguel Arcanjo Prado, Décio Piccinini, Leão Lobo, Nelson Rubens, Sonia Abrão, and José Esmeraldo Gonçalves, among others.

=== Events ===
Receiving 1300 guests each day, the Contigo! Camarote was an optimal location in one of Brazils most famous carnavals, Salvador's Carnaval, and which counts among its attendees celebrities, VIPs and renowned chefs. Contigo! also has a stand at the Réveillon celebrations at Hotel Copacabana Palace in Rio de Janeiro, as well as at Hotel Marina Park in Fortaleza. Since 1996, Contigo! has been the rewarder for the Contigo! Award for TV and for Music as a homage to many of the largest and prestigious names in Brazilian cinema and music.

Between 2006 to 2012, the magazine hosted the Contigo! Award of National Cinema. Initially hosted at the National Historical Museum and, after 2009, at the Tom Jobim Theatre at Rio de Janeiro Botanical Garden, the event would have a panel of critics to choose the best candidates in twelve categories, while the public would choose another four.

== See also ==
- Fotonovela
