= Totia Meireles =

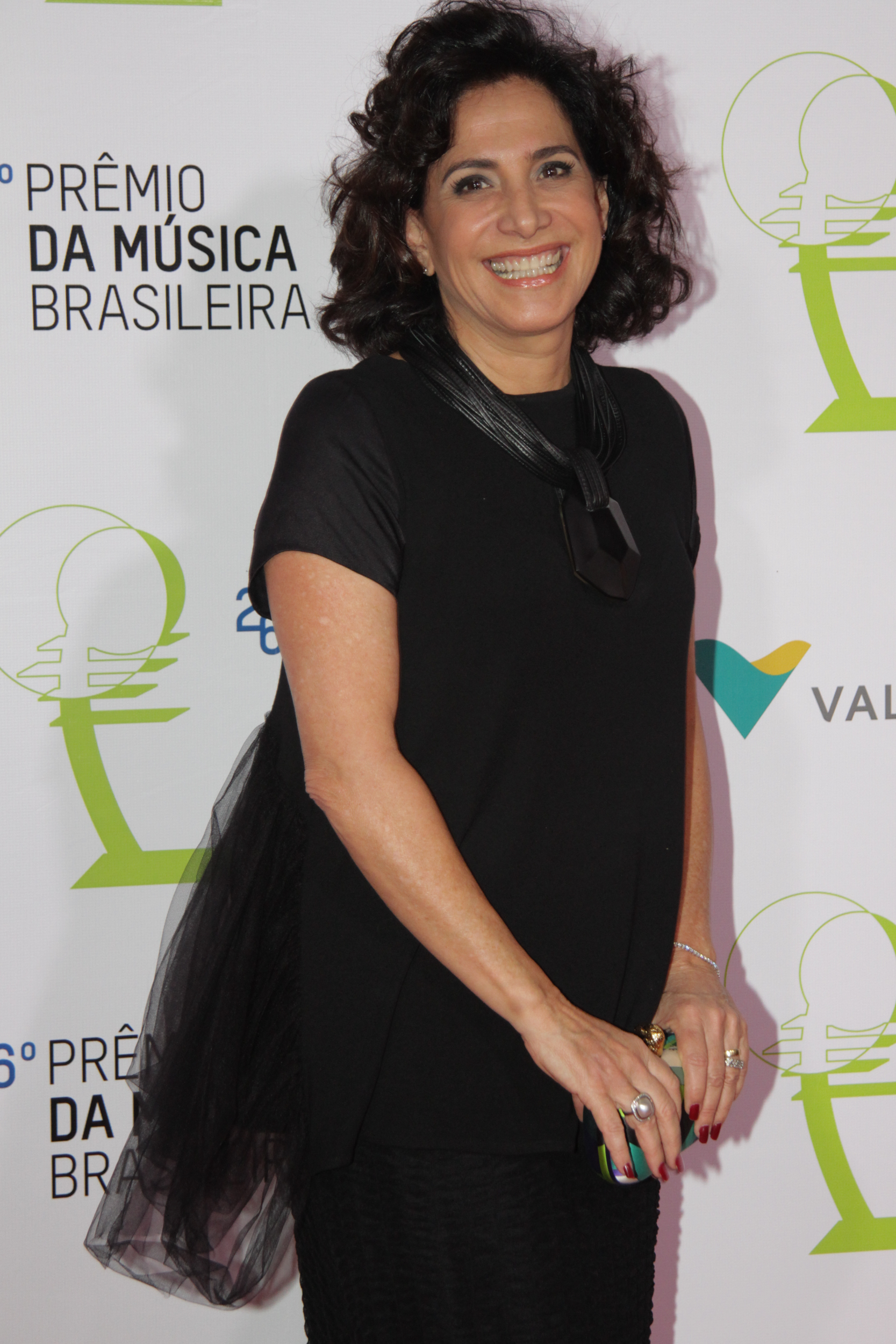
- Totia Meireles in 2015
- Born: Maria Elvira Meireles; 11 October 1958 (age 66); Rio de Janeiro, Brazil
- Occupation: Actress
- Years active: 1984–present
- Spouse: Jaime Rabacov (m. 1991)
- Parent(s): Zulmira Meireles (mother); José Mauro Meirelles (father)

Maria Elvira Meireles (born 11 October 1958), better known as Totia Meireles, is a Brazilian actress. She is known for her various performances on telenovelas, film, and in theatre. She has earned awards for her performances in América, Gypsy, and Salve Jorge.

== Biography ==
Meireles was born in 1958 in Rio de Janeiro. Totia has been her nickname since her childhood, and uses it more than her birthname. Despite being from Rio de Janeiro, she was raised in Cuiabá. She is one of eight children to Zulmira Meireles and José Mauro Meirelles, who came from Conselheiro Lafaiete, Minas Gerais. José was a colonel in the military, who served as a commander in the 9th Battalion of Construction Engineering, based in Cuiabá, which had the objective of building highway BR-163, from Cuiabá to Santarém in the middle of the Amazon rainforest. Colonel Meireles, who for his contributions to the construction project became known as the "Pai da Cuiabá-Santarém", was also the vice-mayor of Cuiabá beginning in 1992, during the Dante de Oliveira government, and became mayor in 1994 as Oliveira ran to be the governor of Mato Grosso.

== Career ==
Meireles began her career as a ballet dancer and soon after was discovered as a singer during an audition for a musical Chorus Line, with Cláudia Raia as the protagonist. In 2010, she performed as Mamma Rose in the musical Gypsy, to which her rendition led her to be nominated to the Shell de Teatro Prize.

Beginning in the 1990s, she worked through participations in Rede Globo telenovelas and series, such as with secretary Sonia in Mulheres de Areia (1993); Elaine, during the 1995 season of Malhação and the sexologist Cacilda in O Fim do Mundo (1996); along with Matilde in Suave Veneno (1999), the friend of Inês/Lavínia (Glória Pires).

In 2001/2002, she participated in the telenovela O Clone as Laurinda, the friend of Ivete, played by Vera Fischer, from there beginning at that point a partnership with Glória Perez in her productions. In 2005, she acted as Vera Tupã in América. In the telenovela her character is romantically involved with Jatobá, played by Marcos Frota.

Meireles, in 2006, performed as Silvana Munhoz, a perfume seller in Saara of Arab background, and the aunt of Duda (Daniel de Oliveira), one of the protagonists of the João Emanuel Carneiro telenovela Cobras & Lagartos. From 2007 to 2008, she participated in the miniseries Amazônia and the series Casos e Acasos.

In 2009, she played the role of Dr. Aída Motta, the romantic partner of Dario (Victor Fasano), on Caminho das Índias.

In 2011, Meireles worked with Aguinaldo Silva as Zambeze Maciel in Fina Estampa. In 2012, she performed as Wanda in Salve Jorge by Glória Perez, that brought more attention in the telenovela to human trafficking, disgruntling the human trafficker Morena (Nanda Costa) and the other traffickers. Her first villain role in novelas was lauded by critics.

In 2014, Meireles acted as the medic Adriana in Alto Astral. In 2015, she participated in the Brazilian version of the musical Nine from the duo Möeller and Botelho, playing the role of Lilliane la Fleur, a film producer and ex-vedette of the Cabaret Folies Bergère. She starred that November in the musical Mulheres à Beira de um Ataque de Nervos, in São Paulo, as Lúcia, who is seen on the verge of a nervous breakdown when she is abandoned by her husband. The cast included Marisa Orth and Juan Alba as protagonists. The following year, she was on the cast of the Brazilian version of Cinderella, where she played Lady Tremaine.

== Personal life ==
In 1989, Meireles met Jaime Rabacov, a doctor, to where they became engaged in 1992 and married in 1994. She lived since the 1980s in the Rio de Janeiro neighborhood of Lagoa. Her husband lives on a farm in Miguel Pereira, in a rural part of Rio de Janeiro state. She went there every weekend if she did not have any professional obligations, or every fifteen days, and spent some weeks together, sometimes going to Rio, or for Meireles going there to visit him. The actress has 19 nieces and nephews, 5 great-nieces and great-nephews, and two grandchildren, Santiago and Pilar, her husband's biological grandchildren.

== Filmography ==
=== Television ===
Year	Title	Role	Notes
1985	Chico Anysio Show	Various roles	
1986	Memórias de um Gigolô	Úrsula	
1989	Que Rei Sou Eu?	Monah	
1990	Lua Cheia de Amor	Rosa Maria	
1990	Rainha da Sucata	Prostitute	Episode: "5 de fevereiro"
1990	Pantanal	Vedete	Episode: "29 de março"
1990	Mãe de Santo	Priscila	
1993	Mulheres de Areia	Sônia	
1992	Escolinha do Professor Raimundo	Branquinha, fiancée of João Canabrava	Guest participation
1994	Escolinha do Professor Raimundo	Tereza Mercantil	
1996	O Fim do Mundo	Cacilda Renault	
1996	Você Decide		Episode: "Tempo de Namoro"
1998	Por Amor	Corina	Episode: "10 de fevereiro"
1999	Suave Veneno	Matilde	
1999	Você Decide		Episode: "O Príncipe da Feira"
2000	Você Decide	Marielza	Episode: "Miami ou Me Deixe"
2001	O Clone	Laurinda de Albuquerque	
2002	A Grande Família	Margareth	Episode: "O Chamado da Natureza"
2004	A Diarista	Susana	Episode: "Quem Vai Ficar com Marinete?"
2004	A Grande Família	Regina	Episode: "Depois Daquela Coisa
2004	Carga Pesada	Matilde	Episode: "Direção Perigosa"
2005	América	Vera do Nascimento	
2006	Cobras & Lagartos	Silvana Salgado Munhoz	
2007	Amazônia, de Galvez a Chico Mendes	Dalva	
2007	Duas Caras	Jandira Alves	
2008	Casos e Acasos	Catarina	Episode: "A Prova, a Namorada e a Isca"
2009	Caminho das Índias	Drª. Aída Motta	
2009	Chico e Amigos	Stella	Year End Special
2011	Fina Estampa	Zambeze Siqueira Maciel	
2012	Salve Jorge	Wanda Rodrigues / Adalgisa	
2014	Alto Astral	Drª. Adriana Máximo	
2015	Super Chef Celebridades	Participant	Season 4
2017	A Força do Querer	Maria Helena Borges Garcia (Heleninha)	
2019	Verão 90	Mercedes Ferreira Lima	
2019	Popstar	Participant	
2021	Desjuntados	Anita	2 episodes

=== Film ===
Year	Title	Role
1996	Um Céu de Estrelas	
2003	Apolônio Brasil, o Campeão da Alegria	Namorada de Apolônio
2015	Divã a 2	Cristina
2016	Mulheres no Poder	Senadora Lucia Helena
2017	Talvez uma História de Amor	Drª. Marcia Bruner
2021	Um Casal Inseparável	Esther

== Theatre ==
Year	Title
1984	A Chorus Line
1987	Noviças Rebeldes
1989	Little Shop of Horrors
1990	Meu Primo Walter
1993–94	Sweet Charity
1993–94	Baixa Sociedade
1993–94	Na Era do Rádio
1996	Metralha
1997	Don Juan
1999	5X Comédia
2000	Um Caso de Vida ou Morte
2001	Company
2002	The Vagina Monologues
2005	Cristal Bacharach
2007	Garota Glamour
2010	Gypsy
2013–15	Uma Luz Cor de Luar
2015	Nine – Um Musical Felliniano
2015–16	Mulheres à Beira de um Ataque de Nervos
2016	Cinderella
2017	Show - Meu Nome É Totia
2018	Show - Meu Nome É Totia
2018	Pippin
2022	Procuro o homem da minha vida, marido já tive

== Awards and nominations ==
Year	Award	Category	Work	Result
2006	Troféu Super Cap de Ouro	Best Actress	América	Won
2006	Troféu Globo de Melhores do Ano	Best Supporting Actress	Cobras & Lagartos	Nominated
2007	Prêmio Arte Qualidade Brasil	Best Musical Theatre Actress - SP	Garota Glamour	Nominated
2010	Prêmio Qualidade Brasil	Best Actress	Gypsy	Won
2010	Prêmio Shell	Best Actress	Gypsy	Nominated
2011	Prêmio APTR de Teatro	Best Actress and Protagonist	Gypsy	Nominated
2013	Prêmio Contigo! de TV	Best Supporting Actress	Salve Jorge	Won
2013	Prêmio Extra de Televisão	Best Supporting Actress	Salve Jorge	Nominated
2013	Prêmio Quem de Televisão	Best Supporting Actress	Salve Jorge	Nominated
2016	Prêmio APTR de Teatro	Best Supporting Actress	Nine — Um musical Feliniano	Nominated
2016	Prêmio Bibi Ferreira	Best Supporting Actress	Cinderela, O Musical	Nominated
2016	5º Prêmio Botequim Cultural	Best Actress	Cinderela, O Musical	Nominated
2016	Prêmio Arte Qualidade Brasil	Best Actress in Musical	Cinderela, O Musical	Nominated
2018	Prêmio Reverência de Teatro Musical	Best Actress	Pippin	Nominated
2018	Prêmio Cesgranrio de Teatro	Best Actress in Musical Theatre	Pippin	Nominated
2019	Prêmio Destaque Imprensa Digital	Highlighted Actress	Pippin	Nominated
2019	Prêmio Brasil Musical	Best Actress	Pippin	Nominated
2019	Prêmio Brasil Musical	Musical Ensemble	Pippin	Nominated
2021	Prêmio Bibi Ferreira	Best Actress in Musicals	Pippin	Nominated
2022	Prêmio Bibi Ferreira	Best Supporting Actress in Theatrical Piece	Procuro o Homem da Minha Vida, Marido Já Tive	Nominated
