= The Tribe (2014 film) =

2014 Ukrainian silent crime drama film

- Theatrical release poster
- Directed by: Myroslav Slaboshpytskiy
- Written by: Myroslav Slaboshpytskiy
- Produced by: Iya Myslytska; Valentyn Vasyanovych
- Starring: Grygoriy Fesenko; Yana Novikova; Roza Babiy
- Cinematography: Valentyn Vasyanovych
- Edited by: Valentyn Vasyanovych
- Production companies: Harmata Film Production; Ukrainian State Film Agency; Huub Bals; Foundation for Development of Ukraine
- Distributed by: Arthouse Traffic
- Release dates: 21 May 2014 (Cannes); 11 September 2014 (Ukraine)
- Running time: 130 minutes
- Countries: Ukraine; Netherlands
- Language: Ukrainian Sign Language
- Budget: ₴14 million ($1.5 million)
- Box office: $215,034

The Tribe (Ukrainian: «Плем'я», romanized: Plemya) is a 2014 Ukrainian silent crime drama film written and directed by Myroslav Slaboshpytskiy. Starring Hryhoriy Fesenko, Yana Novikova and Roza Babiy, the film is set in a boarding school for deaf teenage students, where a novice scholar is drawn into an institutional system of organized crime involving robbery and prostitution. He crosses a dangerous line when he falls for one of the girls to whom he's assigned to pimp. The film is entirely in Ukrainian Sign Language, with no subtitles, and was the first Ukrainian film to be released in many countries around the world.

The Tribe won the Nespresso Grand Prize, as well as the France 4 Visionary Award, and the Gan Foundation Support for Distribution Award in the Critics' Week at the 2014 Cannes Film Festival.

Considered the frontrunner to represent Ukraine for the Academy Award for Best Foreign Language Film at the 87th Academy Awards, there was controversy over alleged conflict of interest during the voting process after the drama The Guide was chosen instead.

== Plot ==
A teenage boy, Serhiy, arrives at a boarding school for the deaf. There he tries to find his place in the hierarchy of the academic community, which operates like a Gang ruled by the King of the group. Their squad participates in acts of violence, robbery, sex and prostitution. When one of the boys who helps in pimping two girls from the school gets crushed by a truck, Serhiy takes his place. He falls in love with one of the girls, Anya, whom he impregnates. Serhiy finds a purse on a train which he steals, giving the money to Anya for a makeshift abortion. Some time later, Serhiy follows one of the teachers home, knocks him unconscious, and robs him, giving the substantial sum to Anya and then raping her. One of the gangmasters prepare to send the two girls to Italy, but Serhiy ruins Anya's passport and is eventually beaten by King and his gang. Serhiy later retaliates by crushing their heads with their nightstands in their sleep.

== Cast ==
- Hryhoriy Fesenko as Serhiy
- Yana Novikova as Anya
- Roza Babiy as Svetka
- Yaroslav Biletskiy
- Oleksandr Dsiadevych as Gera
- Ivan Tishko as Makar
- Oleksandr Osadchyi as King
- Oleksandr Sydelnykov as Shnyr
- Oleksandr Panivan as Woodwork Teacher
- Kyrylo Koshek as Sponsor
- Maryna Panivan as Nora
- Tetiana Radchenko as Principal
- Liudmyla Rudenko as History Teacher
- Sasha Rusakov
- Denys Hruba
- Dania Bykobiy
- Lenia Pisanenko

The majority of the cast, including extras, are deaf.

== Release ==
The Tribe premiered at the Cannes Film Festival on 21 May 2014 in Cannes, France, where it opened in the oldest parallel section of the festival, Critics' Week, "blowing away" critics and audiences alike, before screening at the Locarno International Film Festival as a special screening for the Jury on 12 August, the Sarajevo Film Festival as the part of the Kinoscope section on 19 August, opening the Toronto International Film Festival on 9 September as part of the Discovery section, the London Film Festival on 15 October, and the Denver International Film Festival on 15 November 2014.

=== Theatrical run ===
Prior to The Tribe's Cannes Critics' Week selection, Paris-based Alpha Violet, picked up the film.

CEO of Alpha Violet Virginie Devesa, stated that it was an advantage having the piece before the film's Cannes selection, due to it allowing the company to work with the producers on the trailer and other promotional materials, with her stating, "When we first watched the film, it was such as strong emotional 'shock' that we wanted to share these emotions and hoped for 'The Tribe' to be in Cannes."

On 26 May 2014, Alpha Violet was announced as handling the international sales of The Tribe, as well as speaking to potential buyers of the piece at the Cannes Film Festival, to which sales interest were spurred on by its critical reception. Jonathan Romney of The Guardian calling the piece "the great discovery of this year's festival." Eric Kohn of IndieWIRE spoke of the film as "an unprecedented cinematic accomplishment". Wendy Ide of The Times gave it five stars adding, "It takes a film like the Ukrainian drama 'The Tribe'to neatly encapsulate the festival's real raison d'etre: To discover and celebrate the most exciting, daring and outstanding films made around the world." Karel Och of the Karlovy Vary International Film Festival described it as "the cinematic event of the year". Devesa stated that territories such as the United States, United Kingdom and Hong Kong are being sewn up and currently under negotiation, with her stating, "This is the first time I've had this experience as a sales agent. I hope I live it again. The film is so radical, original, that you might have expected these results, but you never know." Later it was announced that UFO Distribution had acquired the rights to distribute the film within France, Atsuko Murata's Mimosa Films were confirmed to have acquired the Japanese distribution rights to The Tribe, Amstel Film picked up the distribution rights in the Netherlands and film rights in Denmark were confirmed to have been acquired by Ost For Paradis.

On 2 July 2014, Drafthouse Films acquired from Alpha Violet the distribution rights to The Tribe in the United States, with a planned 2015 theatrical release. Upon the acquisition, CEO of Drafthouse Films Tim League spoke highly of the piece and showered it with praise stating that he was witnessing "something truly special". Additionally he added, "Myroslav Slaboshpytskiy is a massive talent. I am confident that he will quickly become a world-renowned director, and I am excited and proud to be sharing his striking first feature with North America." At the news of the acquisition director Slaboshpytskiy stated, "I am very glad that my film will be released in the United States. I have always believed in the universality of film's language, and have always believed that dialogue and subtitles change the way different audiences perceive the film in different countries." On 6 July 2014, it was confirmed that MCF MegaCom had bought the distribution right to ex-Yugoslavia territories, Art Fest had obtained the film rights to Bulgaria, and Film Europe Media Co had acquired the distribution rights to Czech Republic and Slovakia. The announcement that Bíó Paradís had also acquired the right in Iceland marked the first time Alpha Violet has ever sold to the Icelandic territory directly. Alpha Violet was confirmed to be in negotiations for the United Kingdom, Scandinavian and Latin American territories to be collected.

On 28 October 2014, Metrodome Group had announced that it had picked up the United Kingdom rights for Slaboshpytskiy's film, with a planned 2015 release date. Giles Edwards, Head of Acquisitions at Metrodome, commented upon the acquisition, "Audacious, uncompromising and formally breathtaking, Miroslav Shlaboshpytskiy's shattering masterpiece takes the chilling saturnalia of the feral crime film and transposes it into an unnerving, singularly unforgettable landscape.", himself concluding, "It heralds the arrival of the most astonishing new filmmaking talent in years."

=== Home media ===
Drafthouse Films has announced for plans to release The Tribe in select theatres across North America in 2015, as well as additionally on a variety of VOD platforms and digital, DVD, and Blu-ray formats. Additionally it was announced that the deal was negotiated by Alpha Violet's Virginie Devesa and Keiko Funato, and Drafthouse Films's James Emanuel Shapiro and Tim League.

=== Top ten lists ===
The film appeared on several critics' lists of the ten best films of 2014.

Rank	Critic	Publication	Remarks
1	Jonathan Romney	Film Comment	"Poised, brutal, and entirely sui generis, this was one of those rare films in which a director follows a subject to its logical limits making us re-assess our watching and listening habits in the process."
7	James Quandt	Artforum	
7	Drew McWeeny	HitFix	"It is remarkable film craft above and beyond the use of sound, and features one of the year's most apocalyptic endings."
8	Jonathan Romney	Sight & Sound	"Set in a school for deaf teenagers, it reimagines the language of sight and sound (or the absence of sound) in cinema to startlingly original effect; you watch and listen in a way that's entirely fresh and unfamiliar."
10	Staff of Cine-Vue	Cine-Vue	"Cinema never ceases to surprise and amaze, and Slaboshpitsky's début is a film that will leave you literally speechless."

== Reception ==
The Tribe received acclaim from critics, audiences and at festivals all over the world. Film review aggregator Rotten Tomatoes reports an 88% rating, based on 132 critics’ reviews with an average score of 7.66/10, and with the consensus "A bleak, haunting drama whose wordless dialogue speaks volumes, The Tribe is a bold, innovative take on silent films for a contemporary audience." Metacritic, another review aggregator, assigned the film a weighted average score of 78 (out of 100) based on 27 reviews from mainstream critics.

Peter Bradshaw of The Guardian scored the piece four out of five, writing, "I can't stop thinking about it." while too praising Slaboshpytskiy's ability to "[draw] on Samuel Beckett or Peter Brook to create a universal language of anxiety", while concluding the sentiment, "What an intriguing film". Leslie Felperin of The Hollywood Reporter praised the piece, stating, "The use of sign language, deafness and silence itself adds several heady new ingredients to the base material, alchemically creating something rich, strange and very original." He also admired the film's "silky smooth steadicam" cinematography of Vasyanovych. As well as comparing the language of gestures and body posture as "akin to watching a ballet like Coppélia or The Nutcracker".

Justin Chang of Variety heralded the film and its director, Myroslav Slaboshpytskiy, by stating: "Actions, emotions and desperate impulses speak far louder than words in The Tribe, a formally audacious coup de cinema that marks a stunning writing-directing debut for Ukrainian filmmaker [Slaboshpytskiy]." Chang was most praiseworthy of Vasyanovych's cinematography, Stepanskiy's sound design as "vividly detailed" and described Odudenko's production designs as "harshly lit corridors and graffiti-strewn exteriors". He also admired Novikova's "fire and vulnerability" as Anya.

Jonathan Romney of Film Comment granted the piece high acclaim, "[...] it was a thrill to discover something so bold, innovative, and downright wayward", adding that it was "a magnificent example of long-take cinema", and calling it "an astonishing film". He continued by praising Slaboshpytskiy's risky endeavour, to which he "follows through with intrepidity and absolute rigor" as well as Vasyanovych's "precise compositions". Romney further adds, "The Tribe, in short, was the most surprising, most inventive, and in many ways most disturbing film I've seen in Cannes this year." He later named the film among the best movies of 2014.

Eric Kohn of indieWIRE gave the film an "A−" rating, adding, "While the specifics remain uncertain, it's never particularly difficult to keep up with the movie's pace, since their actions speak plainly enough -- and sometimes add far more expressiveness than any verbal exchanges could provide." Praising Slaboshpytskiy and Vasyanovych's usage of the steadicam approach, "capturing the actors' exchanges in their full-bodied entirety"; and Slaboshpytskiy as "brilliantly [developing] a suspenseful core through the mysteries of their conversations". He admired Grigory Fesenko's "body movements" and "precise details" through gestures.

Fred Topel wrote, in his review for CraveOnline, "The piece de resistance is a taboo subject that unfolds in an elaborate single take. It was so harrowing I would have applauded if it would not have been completely inappropriate for the subject matter to do so." Topel praised the cast as "made up of non actors but you wouldn't suspect that" adding, "They are full of life and energy"

Jessica Kiang of The Playlist gave the film an "A−" rating and wrote, "It might sound glib, but it's the literal truth: "The Tribe" left us speechless."

Electric Sheep Magazine's Greg Klymkiw granted the film a score of five out of five, stating "A sad, shocking and undeniably harrowing dramatic reflection of Ukraine with the searing truthful lens of a stylistic documentary treatment (at times similar to that of Austrian auteur Ulrich Seidl)". He continues by commending that, "Visuals and actions are what drive the film and ultimately prove to be far more powerful than words ever could be." Luke Y. Thompson of Topless Robot spoke most highly of the film, declaring, "Compelling, upsetting, brutal and brilliant, The Tribe is one of the best works of cinema of the year - a familiar template recreated in what, for most, will be an entirely new world." Too adding, "[...] this is a movie that will and should be used in cinema schools as a master class in how film is a visual medium."

== Accolades ==
Awards
Award	Date of ceremony	Category	Recipients and nominees	Result
Art Film Fest	29 June 2014	The City of Trencin Mayor's Award	Myroslav Slaboshpytskiy	Won
American Film Institute Festival	13 November 2014	VIZIO Visionary Special Jury Award	Myroslav Slaboshpytskiy	Won
Cannes Film Festival	22 May 2014	Nespresso Grand Prize	Myroslav Slaboshpytskiy	Won
Cannes Film Festival	22 May 2014	France 4 Visionary Award	Myroslav Slaboshpytskiy	Won
Cannes Film Festival	22 May 2014	Gan Foundation Support for Distribution Award	Myroslav Slaboshpytskiy	Won
Cannes Film Festival	22 May 2014	Caméra d'Or	Myroslav Slaboshpytskiy	Nominated
Cork Film Festival	27 October 2014	Spirit of the Festival Award	Myroslav Slaboshpytskiy	Won
Crested Butte Film Festival	28 September 2015	Outstanding debut performance in a feature film	Yana Novikova	Won
Denver Film Festival	14 November 2014	Krzysztof Kieślowski Award for Best Foreign Feature Film	Myroslav Slaboshpytskiy	Won
European Film Academy	13 December 2014	Prix FIPRESCI	Myroslav Slaboshpytskiy	Won
Fantastic Fest	18 September 2014	Next Wave Award for Best Director	Myroslav Slaboshpytskiy	Won
Flanders International Film Festival Ghent	13 October 2014	Explore Award		Won
Kinoshock International Film Festival	21 September 2014	Best Director	Myroslav Slaboshpytskiy	Won
Listapad Film Festival	7 November 2014	Grand Prix	Myroslav Slaboshpytskiy	Won
Listapad Film Festival	7 November 2014	Silver Award	Myroslav Slaboshpytskiy	Won
London Film Festival	18 October 2014	Sutherland Award	Myroslav Slaboshpytskiy	Won
London Film Festival	18 October 2014	Young Jury Award	Myroslav Slaboshpytskiy	Won
Manaki Brothers Film Festival	13 September 2014	Golden Camera 300	Valentyn Vasyanovych	Won
Milano Film Festival	4 September 2014	Best Feature Film Award	Myroslav Slaboshpytskiy	Won
Milwaukee International Film Festival	29 September 2014	Herzfeld Competition Award	Myroslav Slaboshpytskiy	Won
Motovun Film Festival	31 July 2014	Propeller	Myroslav Slaboshpytskiy	Won
National Board of Review Awards 2015	5 January 2016	Top 5 Foreign Language Films	The Tribe	Won
Online Film Critics Society	15 December 2014	Best Non-U.S. Release (non-competitive category)	The Tribe ('71, 10,000 km, Entre Nos, Han Gong-ju, Hard to Be a God, The Look of Silence, The Salt of the Earth, What We Do in the Shadows and Timbuktu)	Won
Palić Film Festival	19 July 2014	Grand Prix for Best Feature	Myroslav Slaboshpytskiy	Won
Philadelphia Film Festival	16 October 2014	Archie Award for Best First Feature	Myroslav Slaboshpytskiy	Won
REC Tarragona International Film Festival	3 December 2014	Opera Prima Award	Myroslav Slaboshpytskiy	Won
São Paulo International Film Festival	16 October 2014	Best Screenplay	Myroslav Slaboshpytskiy	Won
Sitges Film Festival	3 October 2014	Experimenta Award	Myroslav Slaboshpytskiy	Won
Tarkovsky International Film Festival	11 June 2014	Grand Prix	Myroslav Slaboshpytskiy	Won
Tbilisi Film Festival	1 December 2014	Golden Prometheus for Best Film	Myroslav Slaboshpytskiy	Won
Tbilisi Film Festival	1 December 2014	Sergej Parajanov Prize for Outstanding Poetic Vision	Myroslav Slaboshpytskiy	Won
Thessaloniki International Film Festival	9 November 2014	Best Director	Myroslav Slaboshpytskiy	Won
TOFIFEST International Film Festival	18 October 2014	The Golden Angel	Myroslav Slaboshpytskiy	Won
Yerevan International Film Festival	20 July 2014	Golden Apricot	Myroslav Slaboshpytskiy	Won
Yerevan International Film Festival	20 July 2014	FIPRESCI Jury Prize	Myroslav Slaboshpytskiy	Won
Warsaw Film Festival	10 October 2014	Competition 1-2 Award	Myroslav Slaboshpytskiy	Nominated

== See also ==
- List of films featuring the deaf and hard of hearing
- List of the 100 best films in the history of Ukrainian cinema
- One-shot film

== Sources ==
- De Clercq, Eva. (2019). Disability @ the Movies: Toward a Disability-Conscious Bioethics. In E. Mihailov, T. Wangmo, V. Federiuc, & B. Elger (Eds.), Contemporary Debates in Bioethics: European Perspectives (pp. 97–107). De Gruyter Open Poland. https://doi.org/10.2478/9783110571219-010
- Kenny, Oliver. (2020). Beyond Critical Partisanship: Ethical Witnessing and Long Takes of Sexual Violence. Studies in European Cinema, 19(2), 164–178. https://doi.org/10.1080/17411548.2020.1778846
- Shaw, Claire. (2015). Myroslav Slaboshpytskiy: The Tribe (Plemya, 2014). KinoKultura, 48. http://www.kinokultura.com/2015/48r-plemya-CS.shtml
