= Dani Moreno =

Dani Moreno may refer to:

- Daniele Moreno (born 1985), Brazilian actress
- Daniel Moreno (born 1981), Spanish former road bicycle racer
- Daniel Pérez Moreno, also known as Tonino (footballer)
- Moreno (footballer, born 1948), full name Daniel Euclides Moreno, Brazilian former footballer
- Daniel Moreno (Colombian footballer) (born 1995)
