= Dalal Achcar =

Brazilian dancer

- Born: Rio de Janeiro, Brazil
- Occupations: Ballet master choreographer Artistic director Theatrical producer

Dalal Achcar is a Brazilian ballet master, choreographer, artistic director and producer.

== Early life and education ==
Achcar was born in Rio de Janeiro, Brazil to Lebanese parents.

== Career ==
In the 1960s Achcar was the head of the Rio de Janeiro Ballet Association. She presented ninety shows in European capitals using music by Heitor Villa-Lobos and Cláudio Santoro, and contributions from Manuel Bandeira, Vinícius de Moraes, Di Cavalcanti and Burle Marx.

In 1962 Achcar founded, with Maria Augusta Morgenroth, the Ballet School of the Castro Alves Theater in Salvador. In 1968 this school developed into the Brazilian Ballet of Bahia, of which she became artistic director. She introduced the Royal Academy of Dance method in dance teaching throughout the country, guiding schools and academies.

In 1967, Achcar arranged performances of ballet dancers Margot Fonteyn and Rudolf Nureyev at the Maracanãzinho gymnasium to popularise ballet in Brazil.

In 1971 Achcar, with Maria Luisa Noronha, opened the Centro de Arte e Cultura Ballet Dalal Achcar, a school delivering ballet instruction to children and professionals, offering guidance in technical and artistic training for instructors, and maintaining an assistance program in the area of dance for needy children and teenagers in risky areas.

Achcar created the first higher dance professors training course in Brazil, at the Faculdade da Cidade (now UniverCidade) in Rio de Janeiro.

In the 1980s Achcar produced Brazilian classics, creating Floresta Amazônica (Amazon Forest) on Heitor Villa-Lobos music and featuring Gabriela, with author Jorge Amado, Caribé, Edu Lobo and choreographer Gilberto Motta.

In 1986 Achcar organised the II International Dance Festival in Rio de Janeiro and lectured on "The Latin American Ballet and its Development" at the II Latin American Conference of Experts on Ballet, in Caracas.

She was the artistic Director of the Ballet do Theatro Municipal do Rio de Janeiro, and twice president of the Fundação Theatro Municipal. She arranged the first performances in Brazil of international companies, including the Royal Ballet, the Ballet de l´Opéra de Paris, and the American Ballet Theatre. She founded the Association of Friends of Teatro Municipal, and developed the ´Education with Art` program at the Municipal, with music, opera and ballet performances accompanied by teaching materials; the performances were seen by thousands of students from Rio de Janeiro schools. She organised dance shows in the city parks to introduce the mass public to ballet. In association with Funarte, she inaugurated the Memory Series, preparing biographies of artists that made up the history of music, opera and dance at the Theatro Municipal; As of 2013 fifty books have been published.

In 2003 Achcar created the Companhia Jovem El Paso, which premiered in 2004 the show Superbacana: Dançando a Tropicália. Later the company changed its name to Companhia Jovem de Ballet do Rio de Janeiro. The company performs at the Theatro Municipal do Rio de Janeiro and tours Brazil with new dances by choreographers Eric Frederic, Vassili Sulich and Luis Arrieta.

Achcar developed several other choreographic works, among which are The Nutcracker, Don Quijote, Abelard and Heloise, and Something Special, staged in several international centers such as Los Angeles, San Francisco, New York, Hamburg, Stuttgart, Tokyo, La Habana and Santiago de Chile, with artists such as Natalia Makarova, Marcia Haydée and Fernando Bujones.

She has published several articles and books, among which are: Jornal da Dança (1972), Ballet – Arte, Técnica e Interpretação (A technical and didactic book – 1979), Ballet – Uma Arte, (1998), A Cultura no Terceiro Mundo – ABL (1999) and Istanbul – A Fascinating City (Guide of Istanbul, 2011)

== Awards and honours ==
- Chevalier de l'Ordre des Arts et des Lettres by the French Ministry of Culture, being subsequently promoted to the grade of Officier
- Ordem do Rio Branco, and the Ordem do Mérito Cultural (grade of Commander) by the Brazilian Government
- Alvorada Medal by the Government of the Federal District
- José Bonifácio Medal in the grade of Grand-Officer, by the University of Rio de Janeiro

Appointed by the Brazilian Dance Council official representative of Brazil at the UNESCO Conseil International de la Dance

In 2014 Achcar is a member of the council and vice-president of the Iberian-American Association of Dance Specialists, a body connected to the Organization of American States (OAS), and is a member of the Executive and Artistic Committee of the Royal Academy of Dance.

== Personal life ==
Achcar is the widow of federal deputy Luiz Fernando Bocayuva Cunha with whom she had a son. She is the first cousin once removed of the author Nassim Nicholas Taleb.

Dalal Achcar was portrayed by Camila Márdila in the 2024 Brazilian film I'm Still Here.
