= Paulo Vilhena =

Brazilian actor

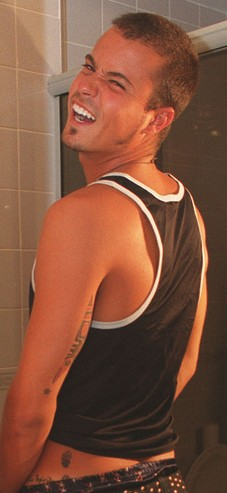
- Paulo in 2002
- Born: Paulo Eduardo Oliveira de Vilhena Moraes; January 3, 1979 (age 47); Santos, São Paulo, Brazil
- Occupations: Actor; Television presenter
- Years active: 1998–present
- Spouse: Thaila Ayala (m. 2011; div. 2014)

Paulo Eduardo Oliveira de Vilhena Moraes (born Santos, January 3, 1979), also known as Paulinho Vilhena, is a Brazilian actor and presenter. In 1998, he debuted in the series Sandy & Junior on Rede Globo, playing Gustavo, the heartthrob of the group. In 2000, he combined acting with work as a reporter for "Vídeo Show," where he stayed for two years. In 2002, after leaving the series, he debuted in his first soap opera, Coração de Estudante, playing the freshman agronomy student Fábio. In 2003 he took on his first leading role in Agora É que São Elas. That same year he joined the cast of Celebridade as the surfer Paulo César, who is involved in a love triangle while being pressured by his family to study for the medical school entrance exam. In 2005 he co-starred in A Lua Me Disse as the bohemian Adonias Goldoni, a character quite similar to his previous roles. In the same year he made his directorial debut with the play Quarto de Estudante.

In 2007 he landed his most mature role, playing wine expert Fred in Paraíso Tropical, delivering a highly dramatic performance. In 2008, he co-starred in the telenovela Três Irmãs as the surfer Eros. In 2009, he joined the second phase of Malhação (16th season) as the unscrupulous photographer Arthur. Simultaneously, he debuted as a presenter on the adventure game show Jogo Duro. In 2010, he joined the cast of the series A Vida Alheia, playing the paparazzo photographer Lírio, who specialized in capturing candid photos of celebrities. In 2011 he played the stuttering paleontologist Cristiano in Morde & Assopra. In 2014, he played his most prominent role, the schizophrenic painter Salvador in Império, who was exploited by a couple who sold his works and mistreated him.

== Career ==
=== 1998–06: Debut and first soap operas ===
In 1998, he made his television debut in the series Sandy & Junior on Rede Globo, playing Gustavo, the heartthrob of the group of friends, initially dating Clara in the first season and Sandy in the second, although he was always pursued by Patty. Around the same time, he made his theater debut starring in the musical Tutti-Frutti: The Musical, inspired by the 1960s, acting alongside some of the cast from the TV series. In 2000, he was invited by Dênis Carvalho to play Breno in Um Anjo Caiu do Céu (An Angel Fell from Heaven), which was scheduled to premiere in 2001, but he was not released by the series' direction, and the role ended up going to Henri Castelli. On December 1, 2000, he simultaneously debuted as a reporter for Vídeo Show, balancing his commute between Campinas and São Paulo. In June 2001, midway through the third season, he finally obtained permission to leave the cast of Sandy & Junior, aiming to separate work from personal life – given his relationship with Sandy in real life. On February 25, 2002, he debuted in his first soap opera, Coração de Estudante, playing Fábio, a freshman in agronomy, who arrives at a fraternity house full of chaos and partying. Soon after, he starred in the play Secrets of the Penis, a male version of the classic The Vagina Monologues, where he appeared in nude scenes.

In 2003, he took on his first leading role in Agora É que São Elas, playing the young Vitório, who experiences a turbulent love affair with a girl who is the complete opposite of his personality. After only 15 days of vacation, he joined the main cast of Celebridade, where he played Paulo César, who was forced by his mother to study for the medical school entrance exam, while what he really wanted was to be a surfer. In 2004, he made his film debut in Xuxa e o Tesouro da Cidade Perdida, and also voiced the protagonist in Shark Tale. In 2005 he co-starred in A Lua Me Disse as Adonias Goldoni, a bohemian young man who falls in love with the girl he previously snubbed and has to regain her trust. Furthermore, he made his directorial debut with the play Quarto de Estudante (Student's Room), starring José Trassi. At the end of that year, she starred in the play "Essa Nossa Juventude," a version of the Broadway classic This Is Our Youth, which ran until the following year, telling the story of young people in search of fame and fortune. In 2006 he participated in the series Minha Nada Mole Vida.

=== 2007–present: Maturation ===
In 2007, he had the chance to mature on screen by playing the wine expert Fred in Paraíso Tropical, a more serious young man with a complex backstory. In the same year, he starred in the film O Magnata about a rock star full of internal conflicts and without limits, inspired by the life of Chorão, the vocalist of the band Charlie Brown Jr.. Em participates in the drama Chega de Saudade. In the same year, he co-starred in the soap opera Três Irmãs as Eros, the best surfer on Praia Azul, who has a romance with one of the three sisters who give the work its title. Around the same time, he took on his most daring role in the theater drama O Arquiteto e o Imperador da Assíria, where the actors performed only in their underwear, using their bodies as instruments to tell the story. In 2009, he joined the second phase of the sixteenth season of Malhação (16th season) as the photographer Arthur, who arrives to charm the main character, without her knowing that he is actually a scoundrel who photographs naked people in their intimate moments and sells them as artistic work. Simultaneously, he debuted as a presenter on the adventure game show Jogo Duro. She also appeared in the films Quanto Dura o Amor? and As Melhores Coisas do Mundo. In 2010, she starred in the musical theater production Hedwig and the Angry Inch, a version of the Broadway classic Hedwig and the Angry Inch, which ran until the end of 2011.That same year he joined the cast of the series A Vida Alheia, playing Lírio, a photographer paparazzo specializing in candid shots of celebrities who works for the best-selling celebrity magazine.

In 2011, he played the stuttering Cristiano in Morde & Assopra, a clumsy paleontologist who only thinks about work. On January 28, 2014, he starred in the series A Teia as Marco Aurélio, an intelligent and cunning criminal who creates a web of lies to escape the federal police. That same year he landed the most prominent role of his career, playing Salvador the schizophrenic in Império, a talented but confused painter suffering from his illness, who is exploited by a couple who try to make money from his artwork and is unable to ask for help. Furthermore, he is part of the cast of the film Entre Nós, about a group of friends who reunite after ten years to read the letters they left for themselves when they were young, winning the award for best supporting actor at the Los Angeles Brazilian Film Festival. In 2015 she starred in the play Tô Grávida alongside Fernanda Rodrigues, which ran until February of the following year. In 2016, he starred in the film Um Namorado pra Minha Mulher. In December, the film Amor no Divã will be released, in which she stars alongside Fernanda Paes Leme. In 2017, he was confirmed in the cast of A Força do Querer, in which he would play Rubinho. However, shortly after, he gives up the character to play the antagonist in Pega Pega, scheduled to premiere in June. In addition, he is finalizing the films Como Nossos Pais and Talvez Uma História de Amor, with premieres scheduled for 2017.

== Personal life ==
In 1998, he passed the entrance exam for advertising and marketing at the Pontifical Catholic University of São Paulo (PUC-SP), but ended up dropping out after the first semester, since he had passed the auditions for the Sandy & Junior series. In April 2000, he started dating Sandy, taking the couple they formed on the show into real life. The two broke up in August, got back together days later, and continued their relationship until January 2001, when they had been together for eight months. In April 2002, he began a turbulent relationship with Luana Piovani, which lasted only a few months. That same year he had a brief romance with the model Maryeva Oliveira. In May 2004 he began dating Priscila Fantin, ending the relationship in January 2005. In June 2005, he began a relationship with fashion designer Roberta Alonso, which only became public knowledge in 2006. The two dated for three and a half years, breaking up in October 2008. In June 2009 he began dating actress Thaila Ayala. In 2010 he was godfather to Luísa, daughter of actors Fernanda Rodrigues and Raoni Carneiro, his friends since Agora É que São Elas.

In early 2011, Paulo and Thaila secretly married in a civil ceremony. The religious wedding ceremony for family and friends took place on November 21 of the same year on the beach in Fernando de Noronha, with Fernanda Paes Leme, Fernanda Rodrigues, and Raoni Carneiro among the wedding attendants. On January 13, 2014, they announced their separation after three years of marriage and five years of relationship. In the same year, due to premature baldness, he underwent a hair transplant surgery, which was unsuccessful and did not achieve the desired result, leaving a scar on his head.

== Filmography ==
=== Television ===
Year	Title	Character	Note
1998–01	Sandy & Junior	Gustavo Beltrão	
2000–02	Vídeo Show	Reporter	
2002	Coração de Estudante	Fábio Vaz	
2003	Agora É que São Elas	Vitório Augusto	
2003	Celebridade	Paulo César Assunção	
2005	A Lua Me Disse	Adonias Goldoni	
2006	Minha Nada Mole Vida	Líber Mantovani	Episode: "Hipnose do Amor"
2007	Paraíso Tropical	Frederico Navarro (Fred)	
2008	Três Irmãs	Eros Pascoli Pedreira	
2009	Jogo Duro	Presenter	
2009	Malhação	Arthur Montenegro	
2010	A Vida Alheia	Lírio	
2011	Morde & Assopra	Cristiano Cunha	
2014	A Teia	Marco Aurélio Baroni	
2014	(Des)encontros	Gael Domingues	Episódio: "Lara e Gael"
2014	Império	Domingos Salvador (Salvador)	
2017	Pega Pega	Evandro Torres	
2018	Treze Dias Longe do Sol	Vitor Baretti	
2018	O Sétimo Guardião	João Inácio Dias	
2023	No Limite: Amazônia	Participant	Season 7
2025–presente	Partiu Interior	Presenter	
2025	Tremembé	Gugu Liberato	Episode: "Assassinas na TV"

=== Cinema ===
Year	Title	Character	Note
2004	Shark Tale	Oscar	Voice
2004	O Tesouro da Cidade Perdida	Lisandro	
2007	O Magnata	André (Magnata)	
2008	Chega de Saudade	Marquinhos	
2009	Quanto Dura o Amor?	Nuno	
2010	As Melhores Coisas do Mundo	Marcelo	
2014	Entre Nós	Gustavo (Gus)	
2016	Um Namorado Para Minha Mulher	Gastão	
2016	O Amor no Divã	Miguel	
2017	Como Nossos Pais	Eduardo Vasconcellos (Dado)	
2018	Talvez uma História de Amor	João Paulo	
2019	Turma da Mônica: Laços	Cebolácio Menezes da Silva (Seu Cebola)	
2021	Turma da Mônica: Lições	Cebolácio Menezes da Silva (Seu Cebola)	
2023	Carga Máxima	Afonso Marques	
2024	Biônicos	Dário Castellani	

== Theater ==
As actor
Year	Title	Character
2000	Tutti-Frutti: O Musical	Betão
2002–03	Segredos do Pênis	Rafael
2005–06	Essa Nossa Juventude	Warren
2008–09	O Arquiteto e o Imperador da Assíria	Arquiteto
2010–11	Hedwig e o Centímetro Enfurecido	Hedwig
2015–16	Tô Grávida	Thales

As director
Year	Title
2005	Quarto de Estudante

== Awards and nominations ==
Year	Award	Category	Nominations	Result
2004	Prêmio Contigo! de TV	Melhor Par Romântico	Agora É que São Elas (with Débora Falabella)	Nominated
2010	Prêmio Qualidade Brasil	Melhor Ator de Série ou Projeto Especial de Televisão	A Vida Alheia	Nominated
2014	Prêmio Extra de Televisão	Melhor Ator Coadjuvante	Império	Nominated
2015	Prêmio Contigo! de TV	Melhor Ator Coadjuvante	Império	Nominated
2015	Los Angeles Brazilian Film Festival	Melhor Ator Coadjuvante	Entre Nós	Won
2017	Festival de Gramado	Melhor Ator	Como Nossos Pais	Won
