= National Board of Review Awards 2015 =

Annual US film awards ceremony

87th NBR Awards
Best Film: Mad Max: Fury Road

The 87th National Board of Review Awards, honoring the best in film for 2015, were announced on December 1, 2015.

== Top 10 Films ==
Films listed alphabetically except top, which is ranked as Best Film of the Year:

Mad Max: Fury Road

- Bridge of Spies
- Creed
- The Hateful Eight
- Inside Out
- The Martian
- Room
- Sicario
- Spotlight
- Straight Outta Compton

== Winners ==
Best Film:

- Mad Max: Fury Road

Best Director:

- Ridley Scott – The Martian

Best Actor:

- Matt Damon – The Martian

Best Actress:

- Brie Larson – Room

Best Supporting Actor:

- Sylvester Stallone – Creed

Best Supporting Actress:

- Jennifer Jason Leigh – The Hateful Eight

Best Original Screenplay:

- Quentin Tarantino – The Hateful Eight

Best Adapted Screenplay:

- Drew Goddard – The Martian

Best Animated Feature:

- Inside Out

Best Foreign Language Film:

- Son of Saul

Best Documentary:

- Amy

Best Ensemble:

- The Big Short

Breakthrough Performance (TIE):

- Abraham Attah, Beasts of No Nation
- Jacob Tremblay, Room

Best Directorial Debut:

- Jonas Carpignano, Mediterranea

William K. Everson Film History Award:

- Cecilia De Mille Presley

Spotlight Award:

- Sicario, for Outstanding Collaborative Vision.

NBR Freedom of Expression:

- Beasts of No Nation
- Mustang

== Top Foreign Films ==
Son of Saul

- Goodnight Mommy
- Mediterranea
- Phoenix
- The Second Mother
- The Tribe

== Top Documentaries ==
Amy

- Best of Enemies
- The Black Panthers: Vanguard of the Revolution
- The Diplomat
- Listen to Me Marlon
- The Look of Silence

== Top Independent Films ==
- '71
- 45 Years
- Cop Car
- Ex Machina
- Grandma
- It Follows
- James White
- Mississippi Grind
- Welcome to Me
- While We’re Young
