= O Fim do Mundo (TV series) =

Brazilian telenovela

- Genre: Telenovela
- Created by: Dias Gomes
- Starring: Paulo Betti; José Wilker; Bruna Lombardi; Lima Duarte; Vera Holtz; Ângela Vieira; Otávio Augusto; Paloma Duarte; Maurício Mattar; Guilherme Fontes; Patrícia França; Marcos Winter; Pedro Paulo Rangel; Totia Meireles; Mário Borges; Renata Dutra
- Opening theme: "O Último Dia"
- Composer: Paulinho Moska
- Country of origin: Brazil
- Original language: Portuguese
- No. of episodes: 35

Production
- Running time: 55 minutes

Original release
- Network: TV Globo
- Release: 6 May – 14 June 1996

Related
- Explode Coração; O Rei do Gado

O Fim do Mundo is a Brazilian telenovela produced and aired by TV Globo from 6 May to 14 June 1996 in 35 chapters. It replaced Explode Coração and was replaced by O Rei do Gado, being the 52nd "novela das oito" (eight o'clock novela) produced by the network.

Written by Dias Gomes with collaboration of Ferreira Gullar, with general direction of Paulo Ubiratan and Gonzaga Blota and core direction of Paulo Ubiratan. He had José Wilker, Paloma Duarte, Maurício Mattar, Paulo Betti, Guilherme Fontes, Vera Holtz, Patrícia França, Marcos Winter, Bruna Lombardi and Lima Duarte in the main roles of the plot.

It was rebroadcast between 15 August and 29 September 2000, only for the Federal District, Fernando de Noronha, and on analog satellite television in 40 episodes, immediately after Jornal Nacional, while in the rest of Brazil, free election advertising for the municipal elections was being shown.

== Production ==
Dias Gomes wrote the text to be presented as a miniseries but, because of the number of chapters, 35, and the traditional time at which it was presented at 8 pm, it was released as a mininovel, although it was in practice a miniseries. This was due to the fact that the predecessor novel, Explode Coração, was shortened in two months, at the author's own request, (Note: The author of Explode Coração, Glória Perez had to be released from her contract with Rede Globo at the beginning of May 1996 for the trial of Guilherme de Pádua and his wife Paula Nogueira Thomaz, murderers of Gloria Perez's daughter, actress Daniela Perez.) and her successor, O Rei do Gado, was not fully prepared. (Note: O Rei do Gado would only premiere on June 17, 1996, three days after the end of O Fim do Mundo.)

For the first time in a novel, objects and virtual animals were created on three computer platforms. For the recordings of the cataclysm a model was made, ten times smaller than the scenic city, which had 35 thousand square meters.

== Cast ==
Actor	Character
Paulo Betti	Joãozinho de Dagmar
José Wilker	Sebastião Socó (Tião)
Bruna Lombardi	Gardênia
Lima Duarte	Coronel Hildazário Junqueira
Ângela Vieira	Margarida Socó
Otávio Augusto	Tonico Laranjeira
Vera Holtz	Florisbela Mendonça (Belinha)
Paloma Duarte	Letícia Socó
Maurício Mattar	Rosalvo (Laudelino de Jesus Nogueira)
Guilherme Fontes	Josias Junqueira
Patrícia França	Lucilene Barbosa
Marcos Winter	Arnaldo Mendonça (Nado)
Pedro Paulo Rangel	Mudinho
Totia Meireles	Cacilda
Mário Borges	Joca Mendonça
Renata Dutra	Fabiana Mendonça
Eduardo Galvão	Dr. José Otávio
Tatiana Issa	Maria do Socorro Socó
Norton Nascimento	Frei Eusébio
Oswaldo Loureiro	Delegado Romildo Galvão
Alexia Dechamps	Valdete
Isabel Fillardis	Marialva
Luciana Coutinho	Jaciara
Lúcia Alves	Fafá Badaró
Cininha de Paula	Zizi Badaró
Ricardo Blat	Emiliano
Carlos Vereza	Dr. Pestana
Tamara Taxman	Clotilde
Tato Gabus Mendes	Vadeco
Marilu Bueno	Dagmar
Marcelo Faria	Maninho Junqueira
Bernadeth Lyzio	Elisa
Renata Lima	Dalva Junqueira
Carlos Gregório	Michel Renault
Tonico Pereira	Chico Veloso
Estelita Bell	Maria Chupeta
Ariel Coelho	Irana
Mário Lago	Frei Luiz
Fernanda Lobo	Helô
Denise Milfont	Bruna
Valter Santos	Juvenal
Cleyde Blota	Creusa
David Brasil	Gisele
Fátima Freire	Marieta
Rodolfo Bottino	promoter
