= Treze Dias Longe do Sol =

Brazilian television miniseries

- Genre: Drama
- Created by: Elena Soarez; Luciano Moura
- Directed by: Luciano Moura
- Starring: Selton Mello; Carolina Dieckmann; Paulo Vilhena; Lima Duarte; Débora Bloch; Fabrício Boliveira; Enrique Díaz; Camila Márdila; Antônio Fábio; Arilson Lopes; Démick Lopes; Rômulo Braga
- Country of origin: Brazil
- Original language: Portuguese
- No. of seasons: 1
- No. of episodes: 10

Production
- Production companies: O2 Filmes; Estúdios Globo

Original release
- Network: Globoplay; Rede Globo
- Release: 2 November 2017

Treze Dias Longe do Sol (English: Thirteen Days Away From the Sun) is a Brazilian miniseries co-produced by O2 Filmes and Estúdios Globo. It was originally released on 2 November 2017 on Globoplay, Globo's streaming platform. From 8 January 2018 to 19 January 2018, one episode per night aired from Monday to Friday on Rede Globo. Written by Elena Soarez and Luciano Moura with Sofia Maldonado, it is directed by Luciano Moura with Isabel Valiente.

The series follows a group of people trapped under a collapsed building as they struggle to survive and escape, the pain of their relatives and friends as they try to learn if they survived, and attempts by the company responsible for the building's construction to preserve their public image and hide irregularities which may have contributed to the collapse. It stars Selton Mello, with Carolina Dieckmann, Paulo Vilhena, Lima Duarte, Débora Bloch, Fabrício Boliveira and Enrique Diaz.

== Plot ==
A medical center collapses in the final stages of construction. The engineer responsible is the ambitious Saulo (Selton Mello), who becomes the target of the press and his business partners. He is trapped in the rubble with workers and Marion (Carolina Dieckmann), a physician who is the daughter of the medical center's owner and with whom he had a relationship which ended badly. On the surface, friends and relatives of the victims deal with the pain of not knowing their fate, and Saulo's company tries to avoid being accused of causing the collapse.

== Cast ==
- Selton Mello as Saulo Garcez
- Carolina Dieckmann as Marion Rupp
- Paulo Vilhena as Vitor Baretti
- Débora Bloch as Gilda
- Fabrício Boliveira as Marco Antônio
- Lima Duarte as Dr. Rodolfo Rupp
- Enrique Diaz as Newton da Nóbrega
- Camila Márdila as Yasmin
- Eucir de Souza as Rey Lopes
- Antônio Fábio as Jesuíno
- Arilson Lopes as Bené
- Démick Lopes as Zica
- Rômulo Braga as Daréu
- Pedro Wagner as Altair
- Marcos de Andrade as Messias
- Maria Manoella as Ilana Krieg
- Jiddu Pinheiro as Dr. Marcelo

=== Guest appearances ===
- Eucir de Souza as Captain Ney Lopes
- Emiliano Queiroz as Gilda's father
- Glauber Amaral as Dario
- Ana Carolina Godoy as Reporter

== Production ==
The series spent two years in production, and was filmed in São Paulo from December 2016 to April 2017. It featured actors from northeastern Brazil as construction workers, to give the story a realistic tone.

== Episodes ==
No.	Title	Original release date	Rede Globo air date	Brazil viewers (Rating points)
1	"Falha Estrutural" "Structural Failure"	2 November 2017	8 January 2018	31.4 (Note: Each point refers to 71,800 households in the greater São Paulo area, and 45,200 in greater Rio de Janeiro.)
Saulo (Selton Mello) works for Baretti, a large engineering company. One of his projects, a medical center, has been delayed and he is pressured to complete it. Augusto (Lima Duarte), the medical center's owner, asks his daughter Marion (Carolina Dieckmann) to visit the construction site one rainy day to check on its progress. Some workers spot a small leak and the building soon collapses, trapping Saulo, Marion and many workers under the rubble. The survivors try to awaken the unconscious Saulo in time to avoid being electrocuted by a live wire about to be reached by rising water. On the surface, Vitor (Paulo Vilhena) – Saulo's business partner – and Dilda (Débora Bloch) – the company's accountant – must deal with the chaos at Baretti after the collapse. A reluctant, suspended firefighter, Marco Antônio (Fabrício Boliveira), is sent to lead the rescue operation. Before the collapse, Yasmin (Camila Márdila) – daughter of union leader Jesuíno (Antônio Fábio) – informs him about her pregnancy, but he is bitter about it.
2	"Tem Saída" "There's a Way Out"	2 November 2017	9 January 2018	30.3
Saulo avoids the live wire, and the survivors mourn the death of their friends and brothers before looking for a way out. Saulo sees a plastic bag carried by the wind and tracks the airflow to its origin, finding a potential escape route. Jesuíno checks his phone and finds a message from Yasmin asking him to meet her at the building. Baretti charters a bus to return the remaining workers to their states of origin, since they are illegally employed. Augusto tells Vitor that he is not living up to his father's (the company's founder) example, and blames him for Marion's (presumed) death. Gilda and Vitor discuss the possibility of blaming the collapse on Newton da Nóbrega (Enrique Díaz), an engineering professor at a local university who was responsible for the construction calculations. Newton goes to the construction site, but the police block him and he leaves when journalists try to question him. He is watched by Altair (Pedro Wagner), a close friend of Zica (one of the victims).
3	"No Fundo do Poço" "At the Bottom of the Well"	2 November 2017	10 January 2018	25.9
The survivors begin climbing a ladder through a ventilation duct, but the rubble crumbles and separates the group; Jesuíno and two workers are trapped on the bottom level. Saulo, unable to regain his employees' trust, intends to leave no one behind and plans to use an elevator shaft to rescue them. Gilda makes it difficult for Newton to obtain the building's blueprints, which could prove his innocence. Newton's wife asks him to stay away from the family because their daughter is being bullied at school over the accident, and he is pressured by Llana (Saulo's ex-wife and head of the university's engineering department). Gilda starts compiling incriminating evidence and visit to Saulo's and Llana's apartments (where she finds the blueprints). Warned by Llana, Newton goes to the police to explain everything; however, he loses his temper and is arrested.
4	"Pais e Filhos" "Parents and Children"	2 November 2017	11 January 2018	29.2
A worker rescues Yasmin. Messias (Marcos de Andrade) talks to his priest, who tells him not to "follow the sinners", by phone on the floor below. Saulo and Daréu (Rômulo Braga) use ropes to go back for Jesuíno and the others. Zica drinks a bottle of cachaça, which makes him aggressive (frightening Marion and Yasmin). Saulo and Daréu reach the flooded bottom of the elevator shaft and open a door, letting more water in. Baretti holds a press conference and Vitor suggests that Saulo may have hired the inexperienced Newton out of friendship; the workers were under-qualified, which may explain why they were so quickly removed after the collapse. Newton is released from jail and tries to give his daughter a birthday gift, but his wife does not allow him in. A Hispanic woman and a crying baby are in an apartment. She drugs the baby so he sleeps, hails a taxi and asks the driver to bring her to the site. She abruptly leaves the cab to buy cigarettes; the driver, unable to pull over, has to go around the block and loses her. He goes to the construction site with the baby, and discovers that he is Marion's son.
5	"Não Siga os Pecadores" "Don't Follow the Sinners"	2 November 2017	12 January 2018	28.1
Saulo and Daréu find an underwater route to Jesuíno and the others. Messias, haunted by the priest's words, is behaving erratically and swims away from the group. Saulo follows him and finds him tangled in wires near the body of a drowned woman. On the upper floor, a drunk Zica plays with the ropes Saulo and Daréu used to climb down the shaft. Marion tries to retrieve them and he ends up falling down the shaft, begging for her help afterwards. Firefighter Rey Lopes (Eucir de Souza) arrives at the site and orders Marco to call off the rescue to make way for machines to remove the debris. Marco informs the victims' families of Lopes' decision. Rogério (Alexandre Cioletti) – Gilda's assistant – sees Altair, asks him why he has not left and gives him his phone to offer a deal. Augusto's lawyers mention Marion's recently-revealed son while discussing her estate; the maid tells him, despite his delicate health. Augusto goes to the site, and meets the child.
6	"Parem as Máquinas" "Stop the Machines"	2 November 2017	15 January 2018	31.4
Marion saves Zica; Saulo returns to the others and informs them of Messias's death. When the electricity goes down, he and Marion search for a way out while the others try to start the generator. Marion tells Saulo that she loves him and her son is his, and they make love. Vitor sells his share of Baretti, and is disappointed to learn that it dropped from R$300 million to R$20 million after the accident. Llana tells Newton that the department will assist him in his defense, which should focus on Baretti's hiding the blueprints. She and Dr. Marcelo (Jiddu Pinheiro) prepare a press conference for Newton to explain himself, but he misses it in order to confront Gilda at Baretti. Altair – who was collecting his money and his ticket back home – sees Newton, follows him to his car and stabs him to death to avenge Zica's (supposed) death. Augusto wants to be at the site to retrieve his daughter's body, although his lawyer advises against it on medical grounds. He shows the firefighters a picture of Marion, and says that he hopes that they know what they are doing. As the machines start working, the survivors feel tremors and turn the power back on. Antônio notices the generator working, and stops the machines.
7	"Contato Imediato" "Close Encounter"	2 November 2017	16 January 2018	30.2
Antônio turns the generator off and on to communicate with the survivors, and they acknowledge by doing the same. Lopes then reluctantly agrees to resume the rescue, and the news of possible survivors attracts widespread media attention. Llana and Marcelo conclude that Newton's calculations were correct, and are sorry that he died before he could prove it. Altair returns to the site, is overcome when he learns that there may be survivors in the rubble, and is subdued by the police. Vitor and Gilda meet with São Paulo's housing secretary, who is skeptical about their chances of honoring illegal deals made with him (and other politicians) because of the damage to the company's image. After the meeting, Vitor shows Gilda video of her leaving the building with the blueprints.
8	"Limbo" "Limbo"	2 November 2017	18 January 2018	29.0
The survivors hear the firefighters digging, but are running out of supplies. Saulo uses the elevator to reach a higher floor and search for food; the elevator falls and his fate is unknown, but his hallucinations of having a meal with two workers who died in the accident are seen. Vitor orders Baretti's security team not to allow Gilda into the building, and pressures Rogério for more information about her (supposed) schemes. Gilda withdraws all her money and brings her father (who has Alzheimer's disease) to the country, against his doctor's orders. Caring for her father proves too difficult, and she brings him back to the clinic before continuing her escape.
9	"Adeus, Perdão and O Sol Não Nasce Para Todos (Note: Globo aired these two episodes together as a special on 19 January 2018.)" "Goodbye, I'm Sorry and The Sun Doesn't Rise for Everyone"	2 November 2017	19 January 2018	29.4
10	"Adeus, Perdão and O Sol Não Nasce Para Todos" "Goodbye, I'm Sorry and The Sun Doesn't Rise for Everyone"	2 November 2017	19 January 2018	29.4
Gilda meets Vitor, and proposes that he make her his business associate; in return, she will help him frame Saulo for the collapse and deal with the press and the law. Vitor sells his share in the company for R$15 million so he can spend the rest of his life "doing nothing", and the new owner fires Gilda. The survivors drop the elevator to Saulo's floor, where they find him alone at the table where he earlier hallucinated. Antônio tries to contact them with the generator, but they can no longer reach it; although the firefighters are unsure of their current state, they keep excavating. Debris strikes gas tanks, causing an explosion; Jesuíno dies trying to save Yasmin (who soon gives birth), and a firefighter is severely injured. The survivors finally contact the firefighters by radio and discuss another rescue operation which will not disturb the rubble. A hole is drilled through unstable layers of debris; the survivors are rescued one by one, except for Saulo (who willingly remains to die).
