= Maybe a Love Story =

2018 Brazilian film

- Portuguese: Talvez Uma História de Amor
- Directed by: Rodrigo Bernardo
- Written by: Rodrigo Bernardo And Ben Frahm
- Produced by: Rodrigo Bernardo
- Starring: Mateus Solano; Thaila Ayala; Totia Meireles
- Cinematography: Hélcio Alemão Nagamine
- Edited by: Helena Chaves
- Music by: Armand Amar
- Production companies: Chocolate Filmes; 20th Century Fox; Warner Bros.
- Distributed by: Warner Bros. Pictures
- Release date: June 14, 2018
- Running time: 105 minutes
- Country: Brazil

Maybe a Love Story (Portuguese: Talvez uma História de Amor) is a 2018 Brazilian romantic comedy movie based on the novel The Discreet Pleasures of Rejection by Martin Page. It was produced in Brazil and New York in 2015, directed by Rodrigo Bernardo, and starring Mateus Solano. It was released in Brazil on June 14, 2018.

== Plot ==
Virgilio (Mateus Solano) is a single and lonely man but everything changes when he answers the call of Clara (Thaila Ayala).

== Cast ==
- Mateus Solano as Virgílio
- Thaila Ayala as Clara
- Totia Meireles as Marcia Bruner
- Dani Calabresa as Lisa
- Bianca Comparato as Katy
- Nathalia Dill as Fernanda
- Paulo Vilhena as João
- Juliana Didone as Melissa
- Isabelle Drummond as Cintia
- Jacqueline Sato as Carolina
- Marco Luque as Otavio
- Cynthia Nixon as Toni
- Genero Camilo as Antonio
- Elisa Lucinda as Simone
- Cláudia Alencar as Bianca
- João Côrtes as Lucas
- Flávia Botella as Denise
