= Salve Jorge =

Brazilian telenovela by Glória Perez

- Also known as: Brave Woman
- Genre: Telenovela
- Created by: Glória Perez
- Directed by: Marcos Schechtman; Fred Mayrink
- Starring: Nanda Costa; Giovanna Antonelli; Rodrigo Lombardi; Flávia Alessandra; Claudia Raia; Cleo Pires; Domingos Montagner; Dira Paes; Alexandre Nero; Murilo Rosa; Carolina Dieckmann; Paloma Bernardi; Ana Beatriz Nogueira; Leticia Spiller; Caco Ciocler
- Opening theme: "Alma de Guerreiro" by Seu Jorge
- Country of origin: Brazil
- Original language: Portuguese
- No. of episodes: Original run 179; Syndication; 140

Production
- Production locations: Rio de Janeiro; Istanbul
- Editors: George Hamilton Metal; Alberto Gouvea; Edson Melo; Rosemeire de Barros Oliveira
- Camera setup: Multi-camera
- Running time: 30-55 minutes
- Production company: Central Globo de Produção

Original release
- Network: Rede Globo
- Release: 22 October 2012 – 17 May 2013

Related
- Avenida Brasil; Amor à Vida

Salve Jorge (Literally: Hail George, International title: English: Brave Woman (Note: Official name in English.)) is a Brazilian primetime telenovela created by Glória Perez and directed by Marcos Schechtman.

It premiered on 22 October 2012 replacing Avenida Brasil and ended on 17 May 2013 on TV Globo at the 9 p.m. timeslot, and being followed by Amor à Vida.

A total of 179 episodes of 55 minutes (35 minutes on Wednesdays due to the 2012–2013 Football season broadcast) were produced and aired Mondays to Saturdays. However, when syndicated and sold to other countries the telenovela got the number of episodes reduced to 140 and the duration fixed at 45 minutes.

Starring Nanda Costa, Giovanna Antonelli, Carolina Dieckmann, Rodrigo Lombardi, Cláudia Raia, Flávia Alessandra, Alexandre Nero, Cléo Pires and Domingos Montagner.

== Plot ==
In Istanbul, Turkey, 18-year-old Morena (Nanda Costa) is auctioned by a group of wealthy and successful men. She ended up being sold for a U$3.500 bid. The next scene shows Morena running desperately through the streets, screaming for help. The scene flashes back to eight months earlier.

Morena is a single-mother who lives with her four-year-old son Junior (Luiz Felipe Mello) and her mom Lucimar (Dira Paes) helps her to support him. Though unemployed, she manages to garner strength and resolve in order to forge her own path.

Following the 2010 occupation of the Complexo do Alemão by the Brazilian Army, Morena meets Theo (Rodrigo Lombardi), a cavalry officer who is charmed by her spontaneity and sensuality. They fall in love, unaware that love does not conquer all.

Motivated by the prospect of a better future and facing eviction, Morena accepts a job offer to work in a coffeehouse in Istanbul for a few months. Her decision, however, not only ends her engagement to Theo, who disapproves of her trip, but leads to her being a victim of an international human trafficking ring.

Cunning Wanda (Totia Meireles), who offered Morena what turns out to be a fictitious job, works with Livia Marini (Cláudia Raia), a sophisticated, intelligent and seemingly irreproachable woman. The truth, however, tells a different story: although she claims to be a world-renowned talent agent, Livia is in fact head of an international human trafficking organization which generates billions of dollars every year.

Upon arriving in Turkey, Morena is forced to work at a dreary nightclub where Russo (Adriano Garib), head of security and member of the ring, constantly intimidates young women by threatening to harm their families in Brazil.

Despite being held captive, Morena refuses to accept her fate and decides to fight against the crime that victimized her. Together with her ill-fated companions, she counts on the help of Police Chief Heloísa (Giovanna Antonelli) to take down the ring's villainous scheme. On top of such difficulties, Morena also has to deal with another challenging mission: to regain Theo's love and trust. Theo still loves her but has since entered into a new romantic relationship and is determined to forget her. In the end Morena with the help of Mrs Heloisa will expose the traffic gangs then Morena and Theo will live happily.

== Cast ==
Actor	Character
Nanda Costa	Morena Ribeiro
Rodrigo Lombardi	Captain Théo Garcia
Giovanna Antonelli	Heloísa Sampaio Helô
Carolina Dieckmann	Jéssica Lima da Costa
Totia Meireles	Wanda Rodrigues (false identities: Djanira Araújo/Marta/Ivanna de Sousa/Jussara Guerra/Adalgisa Araújo Marques/Mercedes)
Cláudia Raia	Lívia Marini
Dira Paes	Lucimar Ribeiro
Flávia Alessandra	Lieutenant Érica Castro
Cléo Pires	Bianca Faber
Domingos Montagner	Zyah
Alexandre Nero	Stênio Alencar
Vera Fischer	Irina
Stênio Garcia	Arturo Vieira
Antônio Calloni	Mustafá Ayata
Nicette Bruno	Mrs. Leonor Flores Galvão
Jandira Martini	Grandma Farid
Nívea Maria	Isaurinha Vieira
Suzana Faini	Áurea Garcia
Walderez de Barros	Cyla
Eva Todor	Dália
Murilo Rosa	Élcio Azevedo
Dalton Vigh	Carlos Flores Galvão
Natália do Vale	Aída Flores Galvão
Ana Beatriz Nogueira	Rachel Flores Galvão
Letícia Spiller	Antônia Alcântara
Caco Ciocler	Celso Vieira
Zezé Polessa	Berna Ayata
Mariana Rios	Drika Alencar
Cristiana Oliveira	Yolanda Gomes
Betty Gofman	Sarila
Tania Khalill	Ayla
André Gonçalves	Miro
Otaviano Costa	Haroldo
Paula Pereira	Nilcéia Ribeiro
Solange Badim	Delzuíte de Sousa
Roberta Rodrigues	Maria Vanúbia
Nando Cunha	Pescoço
Neusa Borges	Diva
Walter Breda	Clóvis
Elizângela	Esma
Ernani Moraes	Kemal
Cissa Guimarães	Maitê Bittencourt
Lizandra Souto	Amanda Flores Galvão
Adriano Garib	Russo
Oscar Magrini	Colonel Geraldo Nunes
Rosi Campos	Cacilda
Odilon Wagner	Thompson
Marcello Airoldi	Humberto Barros
Sidney Sampaio	Ciro Bastos
Fernanda Paes Leme	Tenente Márcia
Paloma Bernardi	Rosângela
Cris Vianna	Julinha
Lucy Ramos	Sheila Laurindo
Isaac Bardavid	Tartan
Clarisse Derzié Luz	Fatma
Jonas Mello	Silveirinha
Flávia Guedes	Salete
Monique Curi	Lena
Duda Nagle	Caíque Flores Galvão
Leonardo Carvalho	Drago
Júlia Mendes	Zoe Kelebek
Brendha Haddad	Neuma
Ivan Mendes	Pepeu
Antônia Frering	Deborah
Sacha Bali	Beto
Bruna Marquezine	Lurdinha de Sousa
Mussunzinho	Sidney
Duda Ribeiro	Adam
Karina Ferrari	Samantha de Sousa
Anderson Müller	Murat
Francisco Carvalho	Galdino
Narjara Turetta	Buquê
Luci Pereira	Creusa
Luiz Felipe Mello	Júnior
Frederico Volkmann	Ekran
Mila Freitas	Carol Flores Galvão
Kíria Malheiros	Raíssa Alcântara
Yago Machado	Hassan
Tiago Abravanel	Demir
Dani Moreno	Aisha Ayata
Laryssa Dias	Waleska
Yanna Lavigne	Tamar
Thammy Miranda	Joyce Guimarães
Aimée Madureira	Rayanne
Alexandre Barros	Ricardo Motta
Jayme Periard	Garcez
José D'Artagnan Júnior	Aziz
Junno Andrade	Santiago
Murilo Grossi	Almir
Rita Elmôr	Riva

== Impact ==
=== Ratings ===
Timeslot	Episodes	Premiere		Finale		Rank	Season	Rating average
Timeslot	Episodes	Date	Viewers (in points)	Date	Viewers (in points)	Rank	Season	Rating average
Mondays—Saturdays; 9:15pm	179	22 October 2012	36	17 May 2013	46	2	2012–13	34

The first episode of Salve Jorge recorded a viewership rating of 36 points, peaking at 40 points with 60% share. Its predecessors Avenida Brasil and Fina Estampa, recorded 37:points with a 63% and 41 points respectively. The second episode registered 37 points in Greater São Paulo. Its first week it recorded a cumulative indices of 33 points.

On 28 January 2013, the show registered 39 points with a 64% audience share.

By episode 90, Salve Jorge had an average of 30.8 points, lower than the predecessor. For instance Avenida Brasil and Fina Estampa 37.7 and 38.8 respectively.

According to accumulated data by Ibope, its last episode that aired on 17 May 2013 registered 46 points with 76% audience share.

Accumulately it registered 33 points.

== Awards and nominations ==
Year	Award	Category	Nominated	Result	Source
2012	Melhores do Ano	Best Male Revelation	Tiago Abravanel	Won	
2012	Melhores do Ano	Best Child Actor or Actress	Luís Felipe Melo	Nominated	
2013	Prêmio Contigo! de TV	Best Telenovela	Glória Perez	Nominated	
2013	Prêmio Contigo! de TV	Best Actor	Rodrigo Lombardi	Nominated	
2013	Prêmio Contigo! de TV	Best Actor	Alexandre Nero	Nominated	
2013	Prêmio Contigo! de TV	Best Actor	Domingos Montagner	Nominated	
2013	Prêmio Contigo! de TV	Best Actress	Nanda Costa	Nominated	
2013	Prêmio Contigo! de TV	Best Actress	Giovanna Antonelli	Nominated	
2013	Prêmio Contigo! de TV	Best Actress	Cláudia Raia	Nominated	
2013	Prêmio Contigo! de TV	Best Supporting Actor	Antônio Calloni	Nominated	
2013	Prêmio Contigo! de TV	Best Supporting Actor	Murilo Rosa	Nominated	
2013	Prêmio Contigo! de TV	Best Supporting Actor	Oscar Magrini	Nominated	
2013	Prêmio Contigo! de TV	Best Supporting Actress	Carolina Dieckmann	Nominated	
2013	Prêmio Contigo! de TV	Best Supporting Actress	Letícia Spiller	Nominated	
2013	Prêmio Contigo! de TV	Best Supporting Actress	Totia Meireles	Won	
2013	Prêmio Contigo! de TV	Revelation	Tiago Abravanel	Nominated	
2013	Prêmio Contigo! de TV	Revelation	Yanna Lavigne	Nominated	
2013	Prêmio Contigo! de TV	Revelation	Daniele Moreno	Nominated	
2013	Prêmio Contigo! de TV	Best Child Actor	Frederico Volkmann	Nominated	
2013	Prêmio Contigo! de TV	Best Child Actor	Luís Felipe Melo	Nominated	
2013	Prêmio Contigo! de TV	Best Child Actress	Kiria Malheiros	Nominated	
2013	Prêmio Contigo! de TV	Best Child Actress	Mila Freitas	Nominated	
2013	Prêmio Contigo! de TV	Best Author	Glória Perez	Nominated	
2013	Prêmio Contigo! de TV	Best Director	Marcos Schechtman & Fred Mayrink	Nominated	
2013	Meus Prêmios Nick	Favorite Actress	Giovanna Antonelli	Won	
2013	Meus Prêmios Nick	Favorite Character	Helô (Giovanna Antonelli)	Nominated	
2013	Prêmio Extra de Televisão	Best Telenovela	Glória Perez	Nominated	
2013	Prêmio Extra de Televisão	Best Actress	Giovanna Antonelli	Won	
2013	Prêmio Extra de Televisão	Best Actress	Nanda Costa	Nominated	
2013	Prêmio Extra de Televisão	Best Supporting Actor	Alexandre Nero	Won	
2013	Prêmio Extra de Televisão	Best Supporting Actor	Nando Cunha	Nominated	
2013	Prêmio Extra de Televisão	Best Supporting Actress	Totia Meireles	Nominated	
2013	Prêmio Extra de Televisão	Best Male Revelation	Adriano Garib	Won	
2013	Prêmio Extra de Televisão	Best Male Revelation	Tiago Abravanel	Nominated	
2013	Prêmio Extra de Televisão	Best Female Revelation	Daniele Moreno	Nominated	
2013	Prêmio Extra de Televisão	Best Female Revelation	Solange Badim	Nominated	
2013	Prêmio Extra de Televisão	Best Female Revelation	Thammy Miranda	Nominated	
2013	Prêmio Extra de Televisão	Best Child Performance	Kíria Malheiros	Nominated	
2013	Prêmio Extra de Televisão	Best Child Performance	Luis Felipe Melo	Nominated	
2013	Prêmio Extra de Televisão	Best Musical Theme	"Dança Sensual" (MC Koringa)	Nominated	
2013	Prêmio Extra de Televisão	Best Musical Theme	"Esse Cara Sou Eu" (Roberto Carlos)	Won	
2013	Prêmio Extra de Televisão	Teen Idol	Bruna Marquezine	Nominated	
2013	Prêmios UOL	Best Telenovela	Glória Perez	Nominated	
2013	Prêmios UOL	Best Actress	Giovanna Antonelli	Won	
2013	Prêmios UOL	Best Actress	Nanda Costa	Nominated	
2013	Prêmios UOL	Best Actor	Alexandre Nero	Nominated	
2013	Prêmios UOL	Best Villain	Cláudia Raia	Nominated	
2013	Prêmios UOL	Best Couple	Giovanna Antonelli & Alexandre Nero	Nominated	
2013	Prêmios UOL	Best Male or Female Revelation	Thammy Miranda	Nominated	
2013	Prêmio Quem de Televisão	Best Actress	Cláudia Raia	Nominated	
2013	Prêmio Quem de Televisão	Best Actress	Giovanna Antonelli	Won	
2013	Prêmio Quem de Televisão	Best Actress	Nanda Costa	Nominated	
2013	Prêmio Quem de Televisão	Best Supporting Actor	Alexandre Nero	Won	
2013	Prêmio Quem de Televisão	Best Supporting Actress	Totia Meireles	Nominated	
2013	Prêmio Quem de Televisão	Revelation	Daniele Moreno	Nominated	
2013	Prêmio Quem de Televisão	Revelation	Nanda Costa	Nominated	
2014	Troféu Internet	Best Telenovela	Glória Perez	Nominated	
2014	Troféu Internet	Best Actress	Giovanna Antonelli	Won	
2014	Troféu Internet	Best Actress	Nanda Costa	Nominated	
2014	Troféu Internet	Revelation	Tiago Abravanel	Nominated	
