= Carolina Dieckmann =

Brazilian actress

Carolina Dieckmmann
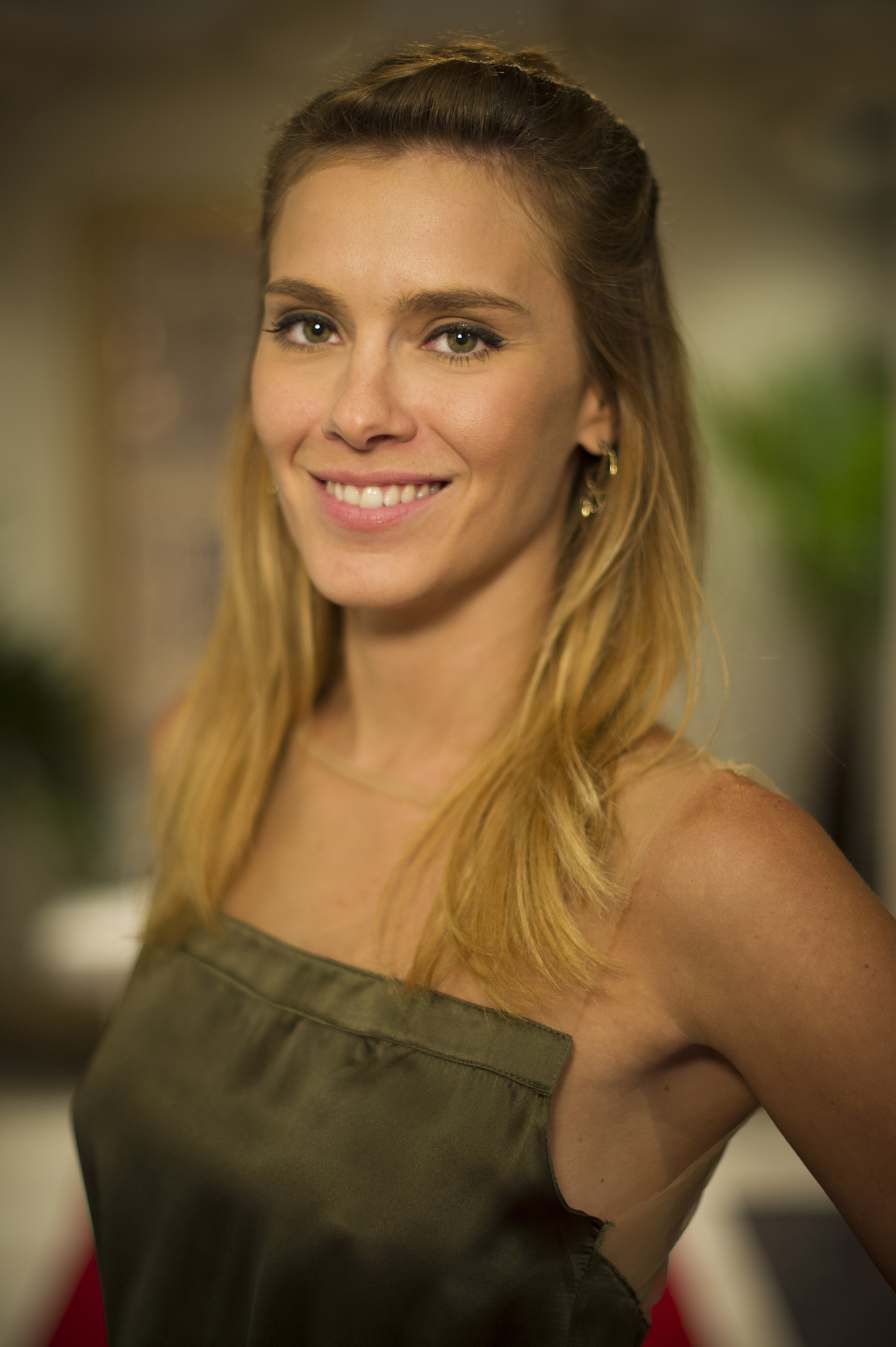
- Dieckmann in 2013
- Born: Carolina Dieckmmann; 16 September 1978 (age 47); Rio de Janeiro, Brazil
- Occupation: Actress
- Years active: 1993–present
- Spouses: Marcos Frota (m. 1997; div. 2003) Tiago Worcman (m. 2007)
- Children: 2

Carolina Dieckmmann Worcman (Brazilian Portuguese: [kaɾoˈlinɐ dʒikiˈmɐ̃n]; German: [ˈdiːkman]; born 16 September 1978) is a Brazilian actress. She has acted in telenovelas since 1993. A 2004 article in the Women's Wear Daily described Dieckmann as one of the "fastest-rising actresses" in Brazil.

She portrayed a person with leukemia in the telenovela Laços de Família; in response 23,000 marrow donations were given after the telenovela aired.

== Personal life ==
Dieckmann was born in Rio de Janeiro, Brazil. She is of German descent.

Carolina married Tiago Worcman on May 6, 2007, and they moved to Miami, Florida. She is demisexual.

== Filmography ==
=== Television ===
Year	Title	Role	Notes
1993	Sex Appeal	Cláudia (Claudinha)	
1993	Fera Ferida	Carolina	
1994	Tropicaliente	Açucena	
1995	Malhação	Juliana Siqueira (July)	
1996	Vira-Lata	Renata	
1997-98	Por Amor	Catarina Batalha Pereira (Cati)	
1997-98	Você Decide	Lídia	
1999	Você Decide	Raquel	
2000-01	Laços de Família	Camila Lacerda Ferrari	Troféu Imprensa for Best Actress; Nominated — Melhores do Ano for Best Actress
2001	Brava Gente	Marina	
2003	Mulheres Apaixonadas	Edwiges Batista	Kids' Choice Awards Brazil for Favorite Actress; Prêmio Contigo for Best Couple
2003	Cena Aberta	Tudinha	
2004	Da Cor do Pecado	Julia	
2004	Senhora do Destino	Isabel Esteves Tedesco / Lindalva Ferreira da Silva	
2004	Senhora do Destino	Maria do Carmo (Young)	
2006	Cobras & Lagartos	Leona Pasquim Montini	Kids' Choice Awards Brazil for Favorite Actress
2008	Três Irmãs	Suzana Jequitibá Aquila	
2010-11	Passione	Diana Rodrigues	
2011-12	Fina Estampa	Teodora Bastos da Silva	Nominated – Prêmio Contigo for Best Actress
2012-13	Salve Jorge	Jéssica Lima da Costa	Nominated – Prêmio Contigo for Best Supporting Actress
2013	Joia Rara	Iolanda Lopez Hauser	
2014	Eu Que Amo Tanto	Zeze	
2015	Globo de Ouro Axé	Presenter	
2015	A Regra do Jogo	Lara Ferreira da Silva	
2017	Treze Dias Longe do Sol	Marion Rupp	
2018-19	O Sétimo Guardião	Afrodite Zerzil	
2023	Vai na Fé	Lumiar Lorenzo	
2023	Angélica: 50 e Tanto	Herself	Episode: "Mulher"
2025	Vale Tudo	Leila Cantanhede	

=== Film ===
Year	Title	Role
2007	Onde Andará Dulce Veiga?	Márcia Francisca da Veiga Prado (Márcia Felácio)
2008	Sexo com Amor?	Luisa
2013	Sheep's Clothing	Lucia
2014	Julio Sumiu	Madá
2016	The Silence of the Sky	Diana

== Trivia ==
In 2012, the Brazilian government approved two cybercrime bills at once. One of them was named "Lei Dieckmann", meaning "Dieckmann Law", after the law got major traction from an incident where nude photos of her were exposed earlier that year.
