= Amor sem Igual =

- Genre: Telenovela
- Created by: Cristianne Fridman
- Written by: Alexandre Richard; Alexandre Teixeira; Aline Garbati; Camilo Pellegrini; Carla Piske; Jussara Fazolo; Jaqueline Correa; Sanderson Costa
- Directed by: Rudi Lagemann
- Starring: Day Mesquita; Rafael Sardão; Thiago Rodrigues; Juan Alba; Sthefany Brito; Heitor Martinez; Gabriel Gracindo; Barbara França; Guilherme Dellorto; Daniele Moreno; Michelle Batista; José Victor Pires; César Cardadeiro; Selma Egrei; Paulo Figueiredo
- Opening theme: "Amor sem Igual" by Banda Universos
- Country of origin: Brazil
- Original language: Portuguese
- No. of episodes: 148

Production
- Camera setup: Multi-camera
- Production companies: RecordTV; Casablanca

Original release
- Network: RecordTV
- Release: 10 December 2019 – 18 January 2021

Amor sem Igual (English title: Ultimate Love) is a Brazilian telenovela produced by RecordTV and Casablanca that premiered on 10 December 2019 and ended on 18 January 2021. The series is written by Cristianne Fridman and directed by Rudi Lagemann. It stars Day Mesquita, Rafael Sardão, Thiago Rodrigues, Juan Alba, Sthefany Brito, Heitor Martinez, Gabriel Gracindo and Barbara França in the main roles.

== Plot ==
In her childhood Angélica (Day Mesquita) was rejected by her father for being the result of an affair and abandoned by her mother. She was abused by older men, grew up in a miserable and loveless life and resorts to prostitution under the name of Poderosa to sustain herself. Her father is millionaire Ramiro (Juan Alba), owner of Bras Talentos Esportivos, an important company that provides agency for soccer players and trainers in the country. Ramiro is in need of a kidney transplant or else he will die. His legitimate children, Tobias (Thiago Rodrigues) and Fernanda (Bárbara França), are incompatible so he decides to look for his bastard daughter in the hope that she will be a donor, which irritates Tobias, who does not want to share the inheritance, counting on the help of Bernardo (Heitor Martinez) and Leandro (Gabriel Gracindo) to eliminate Angélica before and guarantee the death of his father. After almost being killed, Angélica is saved by Miguel (Rafael Sardão), an honest farmer from Mogi das Cruzes who works in the Municipal Market, flourishing a troubled romance, since she does not trust anyone or believes in love.

== Cast ==
- Day Mesquita as Angélica Silva Viana / Poderosa
- Rafael Sardão as Miguel Gonçalves Aguiar
- Thiago Rodrigues as Tobias Andrade Viana
- Juan Alba as Ramiro Viana
- Sthefany Brito as Donatella Ribeiro
- Heitor Martinez as Bernardo Rodrigues
- Gabriel Gracindo as Leandro Campello
- Barbara França as Fernanda Andrade Viana
- Guilherme Dellorto as Pedro Antônio Barros Cordeiro
- Daniele Moreno as Berenice Lima / Furacão
- Michelle Batista as Maria Antônia Barros Cordeir
- José Victor Pires as Hugo Alves
- César Cardadeiro as José Antônio Barros Cordeiro
- Selma Egrei as Norma Andrade
- Paulo Figueiredo as Geovani Ribeiro
- Françoise Forton as Emília Pinto Alvares / Olympia
- Ernani Moraes as Antônio Barros Cordeiro "Oxente"
- Andréa Avancini as Zenaide Barros Cordeiro
- Matheus Costa as Peppe Trovatelli
- Brenda Sabryna as Rosa Flor Moreti
- Miguel Coelho as Antônio Barros Cordeiro Júnior "Antônio Júnior"
- Juliana Lohmann as Cindy Lopes de Freitas
- Malu Falangola as Ioná Coutinho
- Manuela do Monte as Fabiana Braga Motta
- Henrique Camargo as Caio Lima
- Miguel Nader as Willian Souza "Duplex"
- Beth Zalcman as Augusta Guimarães / Carmem Maia
- Eduardo Lago as Luiggi Trovatelli
- Kika Kalache as Serena Trovatelli
- Pedro Nercessian as Roberto "Beto" de Bragança
- Marcela Muniz as Sônia Magalhães
- Iara Jamra as Yara Baldin
- Paulo Reis as Ernani Carvalho Baldin
- Castrinho as Bento Apolinário
- Thierry Figueira as Delegado Fonseca
- Camila Mayrink as Vânia Vilela
- Raphael Montagner as Juliano Gomes Santanna
- Thiago Amaral as Wesley
- Marcelo Batista as Alberto Nicolau "Mike Tyson"
- Marcio Elizzio as Santiago
- Isadora Cecatto as Bibiana Trovatelli
- Bernardo Mesquita as Mauro
- Yohama Eshima as Doctor Tatiana
- Nica Bonfim as Ludmila
- Carlos Takeshi as Takashi
- Jui Huang as Chang
- Alexandre Lino as Xavier
- Ivan Rios as Olavo
- Wiliam Melo as Nino
- Márcia di Milla as Marly
- Milton Filho as Enf. Chico
- Pablo Barros as Guilherme Dias "Cata Bola"

=== Guest cast ===
- Camila Rodrigues as Sophia Loren Alencar
- Felipe Cunha as Antonio Ramos Gonçalves
- Ariane Rocha as Young Amanda Silva
- Charles Paraventi as Danilo Gusmão
- Paulo Vilela as Geraldo
- Jonathan Nogueira as Tião
- Ed Oliveira as Matias
- Raul Labancca as Rubens
- Savio Moll as Dr. Fragoso
- André Melo as Edson
- William Vita as Jair
- Thiago Giacomini as Mosar
- Pablo Sobral as Almeida
- Eduardo Lassah as Oswaldo
- Ana Varello as Luciana
- Guilherme Mendonça as Nivaldo
- Leonardo Lima as Rodrigo
- Matheus Sampaio as Ivan
- Maju Rodrigues as Verônica
- Ju Fontana as Suelen
- Bruna Negendank as Child Fernanda
- Vanderlei Luxemburgo as Himself
- Luiz Bacci as Himself

== Production ==
Filming of the telenovela began on 15 October 2019. Exterior scenes were filmed between 14 and 22 November 2019 in Avenida Paulista, Rua Augusta, Rua Oscar Freire, Estação da Luz, Municipal Market of São Paulo and Rodovia Anchieta. On 16 March 2020, it was announced that filming of the telenovela was suspended for a week so that RecordTV could assess what action to take through the global crisis caused by the COVID-19 pandemic. The following day it was announced that the suspension would be extended indefinitely until the pandemic stabilized. On 26 March 2020, a rerun of Apocalipse was announced, temporarily replacing the telenovela during the filming suspension.

== Ratings ==
Season	Timeslot (BRT/AMT)	Episodes	First aired		Last aired	
Season	Timeslot (BRT/AMT)	Episodes	Date	Viewers (in points)	Date	Viewers (in points)
1	Mon–Fri 8:30pm	148	9 December 2019	9	18 January 2021	10
