= The Second Mother (2015 film) =

2015 film by Anna Muylaert

- Theatrical release poster
- Portuguese: Que Horas Ela Volta?
- Directed by: Anna Muylaert
- Written by: Anna Muylaert
- Produced by: Caio Gullane; Fabiano Gullane; Debora Ivanov; Anna Muylaert
- Starring: Regina Casé; Camila Márdila; Karine Teles; Lourenço Mutarelli; Michel Joelsas; Helena Albergaria
- Cinematography: Bárbara Alvarez
- Edited by: Karen Harley
- Music by: Fábio Trummer; Vitor Araújo
- Production companies: Gullane Filmes; Africa Filmes; Globo Filmes
- Distributed by: Pandora Filmes
- Release dates: 25 January 2015 (Sundance); 27 August 2015 (Brazil)
- Running time: 112 minutes
- Country: Brazil
- Language: Portuguese
- Budget: R$4 million
- Box office: $3 million

The Second Mother (Portuguese: Que Horas Ela Volta?, lit. 'When Is She Coming Back?') is a 2015 Brazilian drama film written and directed by Anna Muylaert. The film stars Regina Casé as Val, the housemaid of a wealthy family in São Paulo, and portrays the tensions that arise after her daughter Jéssica moves into the family's house in order to apply for an admission exam at the University of São Paulo.

The film premiered at the 2015 Sundance Film Festival and was later released theatrically in Brazil on 27 August 2015. It received critical praise in and outside Brazil and was selected as the Brazilian entry for the Best Foreign Language Film at the 88th Academy Awards but it was not nominated.

In 2015, the Brazilian Film Critics Association aka Abraccine voted The Second Mother the 71st greatest Brazilian film of all time, in its list of the 100 best Brazilian films.

== Plot ==
Val, a woman from Pernambuco, moves to São Paulo to provide a better life for her daughter, Jéssica. Val leaves her daughter with a caretaker while she moves to a different city. In São Paulo, Val works as a live-in housemaid for an affluent family where she also takes care of the family's only child, Fabinho. Though Fabinho and Val have a close relationship it comes at the expense of her relationship with her daughter who continues to live in Pernambuco and harbours anger towards her mother for always being away. Fabinho and Val's relationship is so close that it seems as if he is her own son.

When Jéssica is nearing eighteen, Val receives a call from her asking if she can stay with her briefly while she studies and takes the entrance exam to the University of São Paulo. Val is extremely shocked that she received this call from her daughter. Val is very surprised because she has not spoken to her daughter in years. Val, who lives in the house with the family she cleans for, asks them for permission to let Jéssica stay while she searches for an apartment for the two of them. Dona Barbara, the head of the house, grants her permission. Dona Barbara is hopeful that Jéssica will not stay at her home for too long.

When Val goes to pick up Jéssica from the airport there is immediate tension as Val hasn't seen Jéssica in ten years and fails to recognize her daughter. Jéssica also wants to go straight to Val's home without seeing her employers, and is shocked when she realizes that Val lives with her employers and expects her to stay in a cramped room with her. She refuses to stay in Val's cramped and small room when there is a guest room in the house.

When Jéssica arrives, there is awkwardness and slowly developed tension as her presence begins to challenge the social class boundaries present in the home. First, when Jéssica implies that she should stay in the guest room since she is a guest, then again when eating with Don Carlos at the same table partaking in their food. Val grows frustrated with her daughter and her obliviousness to the rules of the house while Jéssica, upset at the way that her mother is treated, continues to defy these rules. Jéssica will not understand why she must obey the social class boundaries. She continues to tell Val that they are all equal and there should be no social class boundaries. Secondly, the awkwardness continues when Don Carlos continues to get close to Jéssica. Unlike his wife, Don Carlos does not have any issue with Jéssica staying with them. He is the one that insists that she stay in the guest room, instead of the cramped servants room that Val lives in. It is heavily implied throughout the movie that Don Carlos has romantic feelings for Jéssica. When she reveals that she has an interest in architecture, Don Carlos offers to take her to the Edifício Copan. While they stand there looking out over São Paulo, Don Carlos tries to kiss Jéssica. She rejects his advances and the awkwardness is only broken by a call from Dona Barbara, who is in the hospital following an accident. Later that same night Don Carlos finds Jéssica alone in the kitchen. He gets down on one knee and abruptly proposes to her. In showing his own views about class, when she initially refuses his proposal he replies with promises of gifts and exotic vacations. When it appears that Jéssica will not consent to his proposal, he tries to make the entire ordeal seem like a joke. Jéssica goes along with it, but after her rejection, he also seems less content with her presence in the house.

The last straw of the situation happens when Jéssica is found in the pool playing with Fabinho and his friend. Dona Barbara is enraged and orders Val to control her daughter and make sure that she does not enter the other side of the kitchen door. Furious when she hears of this and upset that her mother did not defend her honor, Jéssica leaves and gets an apartment for herself. Later, Fabinho learns that he did not pass the test to get into the university of his choice, the same one that Jéssica tested for but got accepted to. Dona Barbara is jealous that Val's daughter passed the exam while her son did not. She tells her son that he must study harder for the next year. After such news, he decides to take six months off and spend it in Australia. Dona Barbara cannot bear the fact that her son has a closer relationship with Val than with her since she is his own mother. Val, sad that he is going away, decides to quit her job and be with her daughter, not wanting to remain in the household with the parents. When Dona Barbara asks Val why she cannot stay, Val informs her that she wants to care for her child. Despite Dona Barbara and Jéssica's issues, Dona Barbara indicates to Val that she understands the need Val feels to be there for her child. As a final act of rebellion before rejoining her daughter, Val enters the swimming pool that has been off-limits for her entire tenure in the home. She calls Jéssica gleefully, informing her that she is currently standing in the pool, which led to Jéssica's expulsion from the home. Val laughs and splashes around in the pool as she breaks the unspoken rules that have governed her existence for the last two decades. Moving in with her daughter right after, Val tells her daughter that they will be together forever and that she is not going anywhere this time. After a small argument, Val learns that she has a grandson, Jorge and that Jéssica is doing the same thing that she did with her. Val will not permit her daughter to do the same thing with her grandson because she personally understands how difficult it is to be away from her own child. Elated at the news, she tells Jéssica to go get her son from back home and to bring him back so that they can all live together as a family.

== Cast ==
- Regina Casé as Val
- Michel Joelsas as Fabinho
- Camila Márdila as Jéssica
- Karine Teles as Barbara
- Lourenço Mutarelli as José Carlos
- Helena Albergaria as Edna
- Luci Pereira as Raimunda

== Production ==
Muylaert originally envisioned it before the release of her first feature film, Durval Discos (2002), but she felt she was not capable of directing it at the time. Originally titled A Porta da Cozinha (The Kitchen Door), it was based on Muylaert's own experience with a nanny, who took care of Muylaert's son after leaving her own daughter. The screenplay was rewritten four times by her and Casé since its original conception because Muylaert felt it was "immature". Casé had an important role as she knew closely the reality of several Northeastern women who went to São Paulo to find a job, and Muylaert was cautious not to create a caricature of the central character. She said she wrote the story because taking care of other people's children is "sacred work that is very underrated." The film took nine months to make.

The main filming location of The Second Mother, shot in February 2014, was a mansion in Morumbi, an affluent neighborhood of São Paulo.

== Release ==
The Second Mother premiered at the 2015 Sundance Film Festival, in which Casé and Camila Márdila shared the World Cinema Dramatic Special Jury Award for Acting. Its European premiere took place in the Panorama section of the 65th Berlin International Film Festival, where it won the Panorama Audience Award. On 15 December 2014 The Match Factory acquired international rights to the film.

== Reception ==
=== Box office ===
The film grossed R$6.2 million ($1.3 million) in Brazil and a worldwide total of $3 million.

=== Critical reception ===
The Second Mother received critical acclaim. On the review aggregator website Rotten Tomatoes, the film holds an approval rating of 97% based on 93 reviews, with an average rating of 8/10. The website's critics consensus reads, "The Second Mother's compelling characters serve an artfully drawn, thought-provoking story that's beautifully brought to life by a talented cast." Metacritic, which uses a weighted average, assigned the film a score of 82 out of 100, based on 26 critics, indicating "universal acclaim".

=== Accolades ===
Year	Award	Category	Nominated work	Result	Ref.
2015	Berlin International Film Festival	C.I.C.A.E. Award	Anna Muylaert	Won	
2015	Berlin International Film Festival	Panorama Audience Award	Anna Muylaert	Won	
2015	Dallas–Fort Worth Film Critics Association Awards	Best Foreign Language Film	The Second Mother	Nominated	
2015	Sundance Film Festival	World Cinema - Dramatic	Regina Casé And Camila Márdila	Won	
2015	Sundance Film Festival	World Cinema - Dramatic	Anna Muylaert	Nominated	
2015	Seattle International Film Festival	Best Actress	Regina Casé	3rd runner-up	
2015	Lima Latin American Film Festival	Audience Award	Anna Muylaert	2nd place	
2015	Ljubljana International Film Festival	Best Feature	Anna Muylaert	Won	
2015	National Board of Review	Top Foreign Films	The Second Mother	Won	
2015	National Board of Review	Top Five Foreign Language Films	The Second Mother	Won	
2015	Women Film Critics Circle	Best Foreign Film by or About Women	The Second Mother	Won	
2015	Washington D.C. Area Film Critics Association	Best Foreign Language Film	The Second Mother	Nominated	
2015	RiverRun International Film Festival	Best Screenplay	Anna Muylaert	Won	
2015	Satellite Awards	Best Foreign Language Film	The Second Mother	Nominated	
2016	Critics' Choice Awards	Best Foreign Language Film	The Second Mother	Nominated	
2016	São Paulo Association of Art Critics Awards	Best Film	Anna Muylaert	Won	
2016	São Paulo Association of Art Critics Awards	Best Actress	Regina Casé	Won	

== See also ==
- List of submissions to the 88th Academy Awards for Best Foreign Language Film
- List of Brazilian submissions for the Academy Award for Best Foreign Language Film
