= Camila Márdila =

Brazilian actress (born 1988)

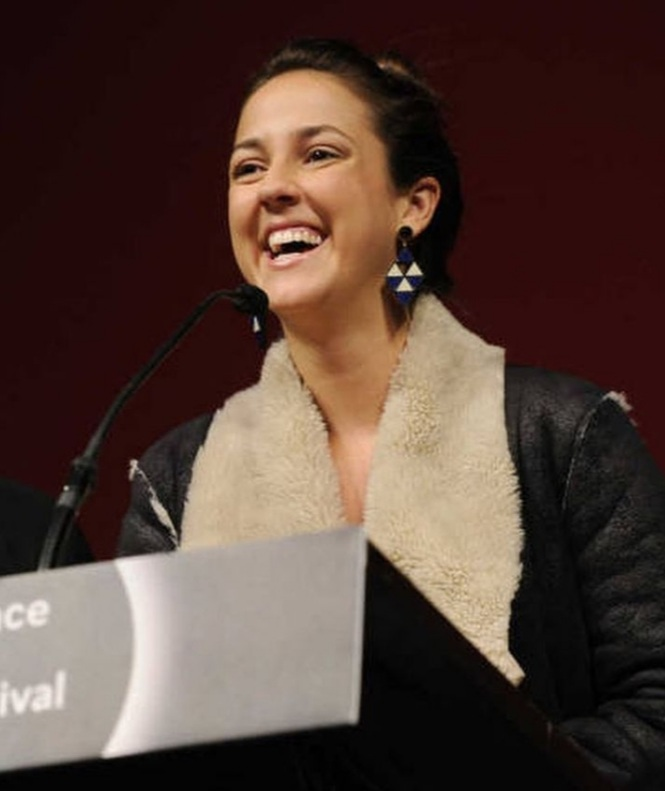
- Márdila at the 2015 Sundance Film Festival
- Born: 21 February 1988 (age 38); Taguatinga, Federal District, Brazil
- Education: University of Brasília
- Occupation: Actress
- Years active: 2008–present

Camila Márdila (Brazilian Portuguese: [kaˈmilɐ ˈmaʁdʒilɐ]; born 21 February 1988) is a Brazilian actress. Her credits include The Second Mother, Justiça and Amor de Mãe.

== Filmography ==
=== Film ===
Year	Title	Character
2008	32 Mastigadas: 16N e 16S	—N/a
2014	O Outro Lado do Paraíso	Sueli
2015	The Second Mother	Jéssica
2015	Tudo Bem Quando Acaba Bem	—N/a
2016	Altas Expectativas	Lena
2017	Cora Coralina – Todas as Vidas	Cora Coralina
2022	Charcoal (Carvão)	Luciana
2024	I'm Still Here	Dalal Achcar

=== Television ===
Year	Title	Character	Notes
2015	Psi	Ana	1 Episode
2016	Justiça	Regina Menezes	Premiere on open TV (miniseries)
2017	Treze Dias Longe do Sol	Yasmin	
2018	Onde Nascem os Fortes	Aldina	
2019	Amor de Mãe	Amanda	
2021	Onde Está Meu Coração	Vivian Rizo	
2022	Good Morning, Verônica	Gisele Cordeiro	
2024	Senna	Viviane Senna	
