= Nanda Costa =

Brazilian actress (born 1986)

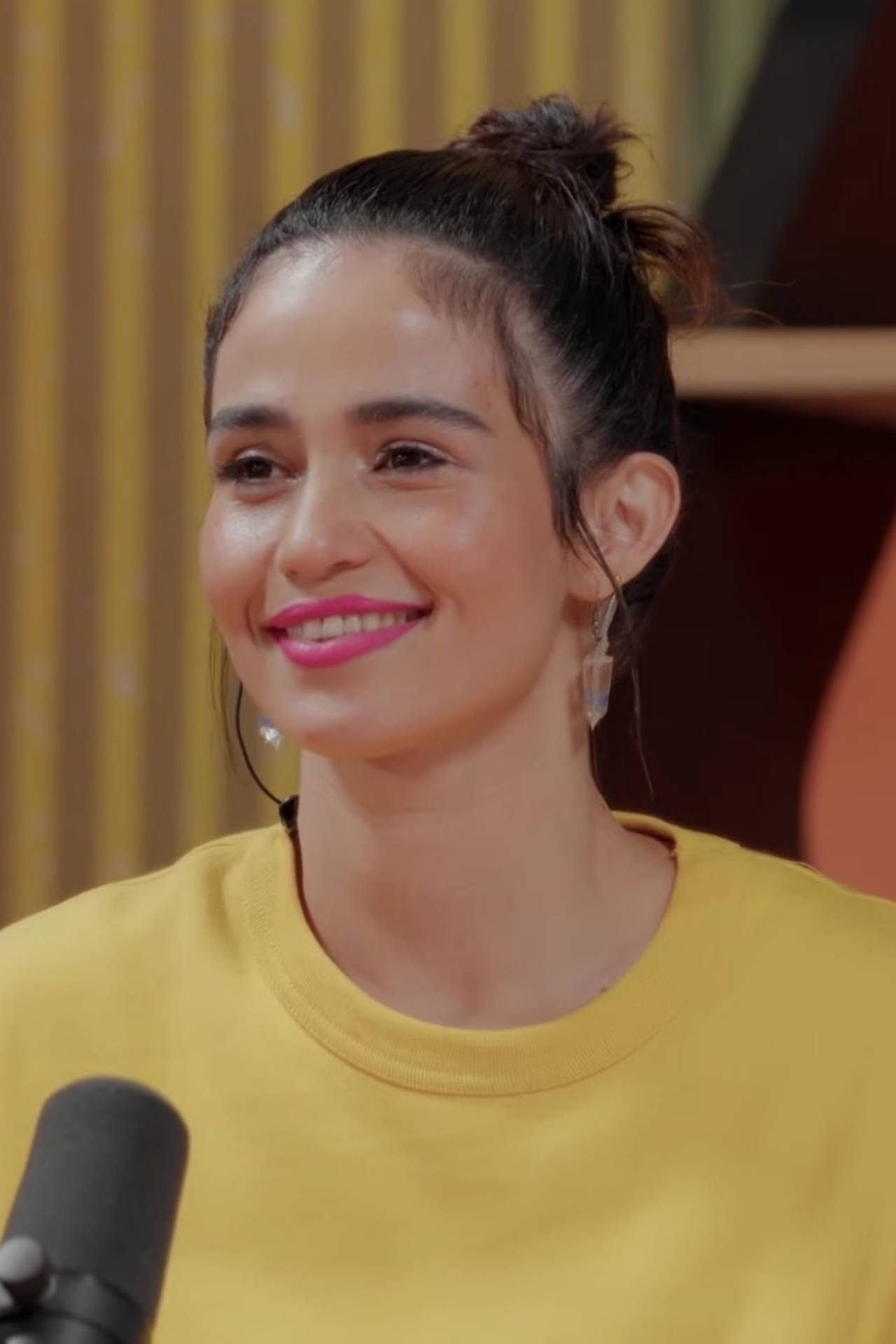
- Costa in 2023
- Born: Fernanda Costa Campos Cotote; 24 September 1986 (age 39); Paraty, Rio de Janeiro, Brazil
- Occupation: Actress
- Years active: 2006–present
- Spouse: Lan Lan (m. 2019)
- Children: 2

Fernanda Costa Campos Cotote (born 24 September 1986) is a Brazilian actress. She is most known for playing the lead role, Morena, in the telenovela Salve Jorge.

== Biography ==
Costa was born in Paraty, Rio de Janeiro state, She has Lebanese ancestry through her maternal grandmother. In interviews, she has stated that she is bisexual and has known since she was a teenager. Discreet in her personal life, she is rarely seen in the press. Nanda Costa discussed her 5-year relationship with Lan Lahn in an interview. Together they wrote a song titled 'Aponte,' which was recorded by the singer Maria Bethania in 2017. More recently Costa and Lanh wrote a song titled 'Não é Comum, mas é normal' that could be translated as 'It's not usual but it's normal,' about LGBTQ representation.

== Career ==
She played her first role in the 2006 Rede Globo telenovela Cobras & Lagartos, in which she starred as the antagonist Madá. After participating in 2008 in the Globo's special Por Toda Minha Vida and in one episode of Ó Paí, Ó. In 2009, she played in Viver a Vida as Soraia. Nanda Costa was nominated for several awards for her role as the prostitute Jéssica in the 2010 film Sonhos Roubados. Costa participated in the same year of one episode of Clandestinos - O Sonho Começou, character also named Nanda. In 2011, she played the antagonist Lilica in the telenovela Cordel Encantado by Duca Rachid and Thelma Guedes. Nanda Costa played the lead role, Morena, a victim of human trafficking, in the 2012 Rede Globo telenovela Salve Jorge by Glória Perez.

== Filmography ==
=== Television ===
Television
Year	Title	Role	Notes
2006	Cobras & Lagartos	Madá (Maria Madalena Padilha)	Antagonist
2008	Por Toda Minha Vida	Dolores Duran	Episode: "Dolores Duran"
2008	Ó Paí, Ó	Quenga	Episode: "A Quenga do Matagal"
2009	Viver a Vida	Soraia Villela	Antagonist
2010	Clandestinos - O Sonho Começou	Nanda	Episode: "Último Episódio"
2011	Amor em 4 Atos	Girl	Episode: "Folhetim & Vitrines"
2011	Cordel Encantado	Lilica (Lillian Desireé)	Antagonist
2012	Salve Jorge	Morena	Lead role
2014	O Caçador	Marinalva	
2014	Império	Tuane dos Santos	
2015	Malhação	Josefina Carrara	Season 22
2015	Romance Policial - Espinosa	Camila	
2017	Pega Pega	Sandra Helena	
2018	Segundo Sol	Maura	
2019	Segunda Chamada	Rita Maria de Cássia	
2019	Amor de Mãe	Érica dos Santos Silva	
2023	The Masked Singer Brasil	Vovó Tartaruga	Season 3
2024	Justiça	Milena Souza de Jesus	Season 2

=== Film ===
Film
Year	Title	Role
2007	Querô	Girl 3
2008	Sexo com Amor?	Juliana
2008	Bezerra de Menezes: O Diário de um Espírito	Lady
2009	Carmo	Rosália
2009	Um Homem Qualquer	Lia
2010	Sonhos Roubados	Jéssica
2011	Rat Fever	Eneida
2012	Gonzaga - de Pai pra Filho	Odaléia Guedes
2014	Love Film Festival	Camila
2014	Infância	Iracema
2020	Monster Hunter	Lea

=== Stage ===
Stage
Year	Title	Role
2009	Cravo e a Rosa - Musical	Rosicleide
2011	A República em Laguna	Anita Garibaldi

== Awards and nominations ==
- 2007 - (Nominated) Quality Award Brazil - Best Actress Breakthrough for Cobras & Lagartos.
- 2007 - (Nominated) Contigo Prize! TV - Best Actress Breakthrough for Cobras & Lagartos.
- 2008 - (Nominated) Quality Award Brazil - Best Actress Breakthrough for Bezerra de Menezes: O Diário de um Espírito.
- 2010 - Rio de Janeiro International Film Festival - Best Actress for Sonhos Roubados.
- 2010 - Brazilian Film Festival of Paris - best actress for Sonhos Roubados.
- 2010 - Brazilian Film Festival of Miami - Best Actress for Sonhos Roubados.
- 2010 - Festival of Biarritz - best actress for Sonhos Roubados.
- 2011 - Paulinia Film Festival - Best Actress for Febre do Rato.
- 2012 - (Nominated) Guarani Brazilian Cinema Award - best actress for Febre do Rato.
- 2013 - (Nominated) Grand Prix of Brazilian Cinema - best actress for Febre do Rato.
- 2013 - (Nominated) for Contigo Award ! TV - best actress for Salve Jorge.
- 2013 - (Nominated) for Extra Award for Television - best actress for Salve Jorge.
- 2013 - (Nominated) for UOL awards - best actress for Salve Jorge.
- 2013 - (Nominated) Award Quem de Televisão - best actress for Salve Jorge.
- 2014 - (Nominated) Troféu Internet award - best actress for Salve Jorge.
- 2018 - (Nominated) 19th Latin Grammy Awards - best portuguese language song for "Aponte".
