= Daniele Moreno =

Brazilian actress

Dani Moreno
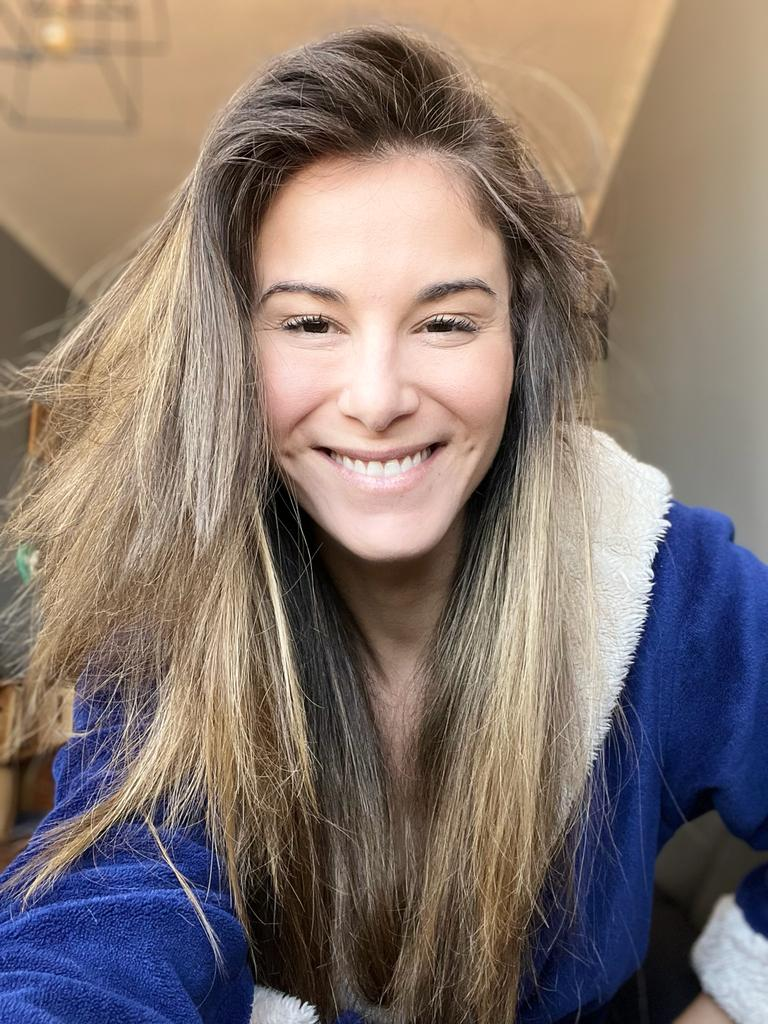
- Dani Moreno in 2022
- Born: Daniele Morato Moreno; November 4, 1985 (age 39); São Paulo, São Paulo, Brazil
- Occupation: Actress
- Years active: 2005–present

Daniele Morato Moreno (born November 4, 1985), commonly known as Dani Moreno, is a Brazilian actress.

== Career ==
Born in São Paulo, Dani Moreno made her stage debut in 2005, being part of the cast for the play A Dança dos Signos, by Oswaldo Montenegro.

In 2006 Moreno starred in the play O Banquete da Vida. She later worked on several classic plays, such as Twelfth Night, Our Town and Three Sisters.

Moreno made her television debut in 2011, after being called to interpret the character Martha in the telenovela Amor e Revolução, for SBT.

In 2012 she was contracted by Rede Globo to be part of the cast of Salve Jorge, where she interpreted Aisha.

In 2015 she returned to SBT, for the role of Safira in Cúmplices de um Resgate, the novela's main villain.

In 2019 she moved to RecordTV to work on the telenovela Amor sem Igual.

== Personal life ==
Moreno is a vegan, having swapped to the diet in 2019. Besides her acting career, she also works on campaigns for the Brazilian Vegetarian Society since 2020.

In 2021 Moreno was diagnosed with ankylosing spondylitis. She revealed her diagnosis through an Instagram post.

== Filmography ==
=== Television ===
Year	Title	Character	Notes	Broadcaster	Ref.
2010	Tribunal na TV	Nerita	Episode: "12 de novembro"	Band TV	
2011	Amor e Revolução	Martha		SBT	
2012	Salve Jorge	Aisha Ayata / Regina		TV Globo	
2015	Cúmplices de um Resgate	Safira Meneses		SBT	
2018	Jesus	Marta de Betânia		RecordTV	
2019	Amor sem Igual	Berenice Lima / Furacão		RecordTV	
2021	Gênesis	Aolibama	Phase: Jacó	RecordTV	
2022	Além da Ilusão	Anastácia Lobato	Special appearance	TV Globo	

== Theater ==
Year	Title
2005	A Dança dos Signos
2006–07	O Banquete da Vida
2009	Noite de Reis
2009	As Três Irmãs
2010–11	Nossa Cidade
2013	33 Dedos bem aquecidos
2014–15	Retratos e Canções
2016	O Livro de Tatiana
2017	Pessoas Brutas
2017	Mequetrefe Sorrateiro
2019	O Bote da Loba
2021	Clareana
2022	E o Zé, quem é?

== Awards and nominations ==
Year	Award	Category	Recipient	Outcome	Ref.
2012	Melhores do UOL e PopTevê	Melhor Atriz Revelação	Salve Jorge	Nominated	
2013	Prêmio Contigo! de TV	Revelação da TV	Salve Jorge	Nominated	
2013	Prêmio Quem de Televisão	Melhor Revelação	Salve Jorge	Nominated	
2013	Prêmio Extra de Televisão	Atriz Revelação	Salve Jorge	Nominated	
2020	Prêmio Noticias de TV	Melhor Atriz Coadjuvante	Amor sem Igual	Won	
