= Sheep's Clothing =

2013 film directed by Paulo Morelli

Entre Nós
- Theatrical release poster
- Directed by: Paulo Morelli; Pedro Morelli
- Produced by: Cristina Abi; Paulo Morelli
- Starring: Júlio Andrade; Caio Blat; Carolina Dieckmann; Martha Nowill; Maria Ribeiro; Lee Taylor; Paulo Vilhena
- Cinematography: Gustavo Hadba
- Edited by: Lucas Gonzaga
- Production company: O2 Filmes
- Distributed by: Downtown Filmes
- Release dates: 3 October 2013 (Rio International Film Festival); 27 March 2014 (Brazil)
- Running time: 100 minutes
- Country: Brazil
- Language: Portuguese

Sheep's Clothing (Portuguese: Entre Nós) is a 2013 Brazilian drama film directed by Paulo Morelli and Pedro Morelli, starring Júlio Andrade, Caio Blat, Carolina Dieckmann, Martha Nowill, Maria Ribeiro, Lee Taylor and Paulo Vilhena.

== Plot ==
Seven young writers friends traveling to a farmhouse to celebrate the publication of the first book of the group. There, they write letters to be opened ten years later. The trip ends in tragedy after the death of one of the friends. Even then, they meet ten years later to read the letters.

== Cast ==
- Júlio Andrade as Cazé
- Caio Blat as Felipe
- Carolina Dieckmann as Lucia
- Martha Nowill as Drica
- Maria Ribeiro as Silvana
- Lee Taylor as Rafa
- Paulo Vilhena as Gus
