= Empreguetes =

Fictional Brazilian musical group

- Origin: Rio de Janeiro; Brazil
- Genres: Dance, Electropop, Pop
- Years active: 2012-present
- Members: Leandra Leal; Taís Araújo; Isabelle Drummond

Empreguetes is a fictional group appearing in the Brazilian telenovela Cheias de Charme. It is formed by Penha (Taís Araújo), Rosário (Leandra Leal) and Cida (Isabelle Drummond). In the telenovela, the group was formed by chance. On a night where the three employees were spending the night at the home of the singer Chayene (Cláudia Abreu), who was traveling, Rosário woke up in the middle of the night and decided to write a song called "Empreguete's Life". The next morning, Rosário called Kleiton (Fabio Neppo) to record the song with the participation of Penha and Cida in Chayene's studio. They eventually recorded a video clip the same day, using Chayene's clothes and home in it. The clip was posted on the internet on May 19, 2012. The clip went viral, and the singers were ultimately arrested for their unauthorized use of Chayene's belongings.

The group is inspired by American group Destiny's Child.

== Discography ==
- 2012 - Cheias de Charme

== Singles ==
- 2012- Vida de Empreguete (Life of employees) (could also be interpreted as “life of maids” due to the maid-like imagery in the MV)
- 2012- Marias Brasileiras (Brazilian Marias)
- 2012 - Nosso Brilho (Our Glow)
