= Arlindo Lopes =

Brazilian actor and director (born 1979)

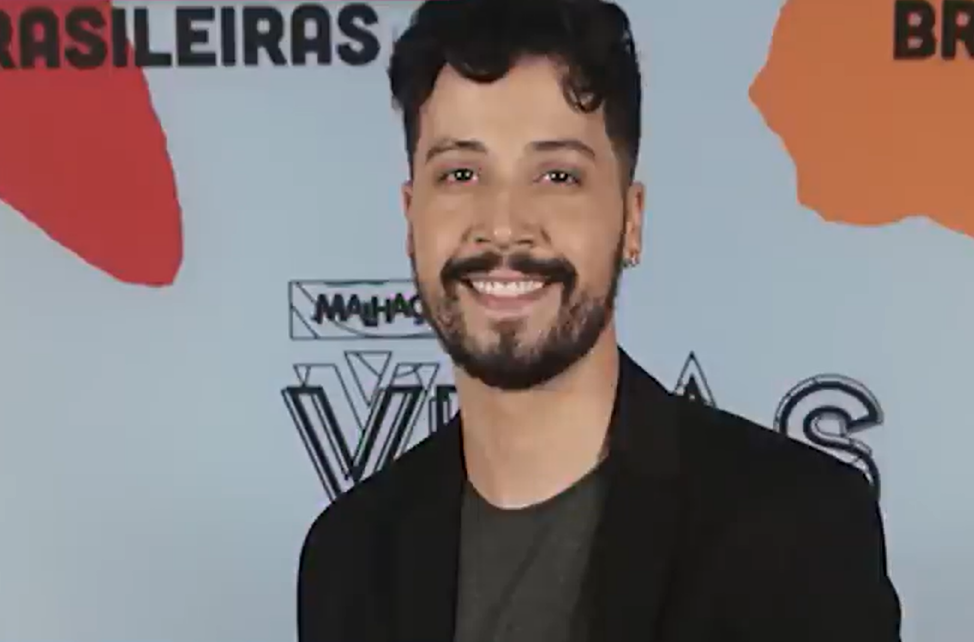
- Lopes in 2018
- Born: 7 March 1979 (age 47); Rio de Janeiro, Brazil
- Occupations: Actor; theatre director; producer
- Years active: 1999–present
- Partner: Gilberto Filho

Arlindo Lopes (born 7 March 1979) is a Brazilian actor, producer, and theatre director who has been active on stage as well as in national telenovelas and some film productions, including the 2002 film City of God.

== Career ==
Lopes was born in Rio de Janeiro on 7 March 1979. He showed interest in acting as early as the age of five and started taking acting classes when he was 13. Lopes stated that he suffered from bullying during his time at school and that he was not able to socialise with other children, often hiding during the recess to avoid being harassed by fellow students.

He began his television career by taking part in the cast of Malhação and later acted in telenovelas like Sabor da Paixão (2002), Da Cor do Pecado (2004), Geração Brasil (2014), and A Lei do Amor (2016). In television series or miniseries, Lopes has been featured in A Grande Família (2002), A Diarista (2005), Faça Sua História (2008), and Louco por Elas in 2013.

In 2007, Lopes was involved in a theatre production along with actress Glória Menezes in the stage adaptation of the 1971 American film Harold and Maude, where Lopes plays the role of a 19-year-old man in a relationship with a 79-year-old woman. The play was relaunched in 2015 again with Lopes and Menezes and in 2022 with Lopes and actress Nívea Maria replacing Menezes. The original release of the play received several awards at the 2008 Prêmio Qualidade Brasil and Prêmio APTR ceremonies. The 2022 version was directed by João Falcão and made its debut at Teatro Porto in Campos Elíseos, a review highlighted the chemistry between Lopes and Maria. When interviewed in September 2022, Maria commented that Lopes was a "young man who fights to keep theatre plays afloat," adding that Lopes is a "guy who does everything" in reference to his work as theatre director and producer.

Lopes has also developed a career within cinema, taking part in the cast of the Brazilian film City of God in 2002 in a minor role. He also appeared in the 2004 film Cazuza: O Tempo Não Pára, the Portuguese-Brazilian comedy film Alguém como Eu (2017), the Argentine-Brazilian drama production A Voz do Silêncio (2018) and the thriller Ninguém Sai Vivo Daqui in 2023.

In 2021, Lopes was cast for the drama thriller television series Colônia, which recounts the story of a psychiatric hospital in Minas Gerais in the early 1970s where more than 60,000 patients died over the span of several decades. Lopes plays the role of a gay man who shares the facility with others like an alcoholic man, a prostitute woman, an elderly lady and others deemed "undesirable" by society. The series drew a comparison between the Aktion T4 scheme of the Nazis and what happened at the Minas Gerais hospital, with Lopes pointing to the fact that most of the patients at the facility did not have an actual or active mental health disorder. Journalist Heloisa Tolipan noted that around 70% of people who go through commitment to a mental hospital are not mentally ill.

== Personal life ==
Lopes is gay and in a relationship with publicist Gilberto Filho. They live together in Laranjeiras, Rio de Janeiro, and have a pet dog. In January 2019, Lopes and Filho celebrated their anniversary on a cruise ship trip along the coast of South America, including a visit to Buenos Aires. Actress Leandra Leal and her young daughter accompanied the couple on the trip.

== Selected roles ==
=== Television ===
Year	Title	Role	Ref.
2001	Malhação	Adalberto (Beto)	
2002	Sabor da Paixão	Zezinho	
2002	A Grande Família		
2004	Da Cor do Pecado	Cecinha	
2005	A Diarista	Nurse	
2005–2007	Tecendo o Saber	Ezequiel	
2008	Faça Sua História	Passenger	
2013	Adorável Psicose	Felipe	
2014	Now Generation (Geração Brasil)	Davendra Ananda	
2016–2017	A Lei do Amor	Sansão	
2021	Colônia	Gilberto	

=== Film ===
Year	Title	Role	Ref.
2002	City of God	Young man	
2004	Cazuza: O Tempo Não Pára	Dé Palmeira	
2017	Alguém Como Eu	Fred	
2018	A Voz do Silêncio		
2018	O Beijos no Asfalto		
2023	Ninguém Sai Vivo Daqui	Gilberto	

=== Stage ===
Year	Title	Role	Ref.
1999	Um Homem Chamado Shakespeare	Romeo	
2000	Fauso Gastrônomo	Anjo Bom	
2001	Marat-Sade	Robespierre	
2001	Through the Looking-Glass	Lagarta	
2002	Trainspotting	Tommy	
2002	A Clockwork Orange	Chaplain	
2006–2007	Cauby! Cauby!	Alexandre	
2007–2022 (Note: In 2007 and 2015 along actress Glória Menezes and in 2022 with actress Nívea Maria.)	Ensina-me a Viver (Harold and Maude)	Harold Chasen	
2008	A Ver Estrelas	Jonas	
2013	The Secret Garden	Gregório (Colin Craven)	
2013	Academia do Coração	Alex	
2021	The Normal Heart		
