= Isabelle Drummond =

Brazilian actress (born 1994)

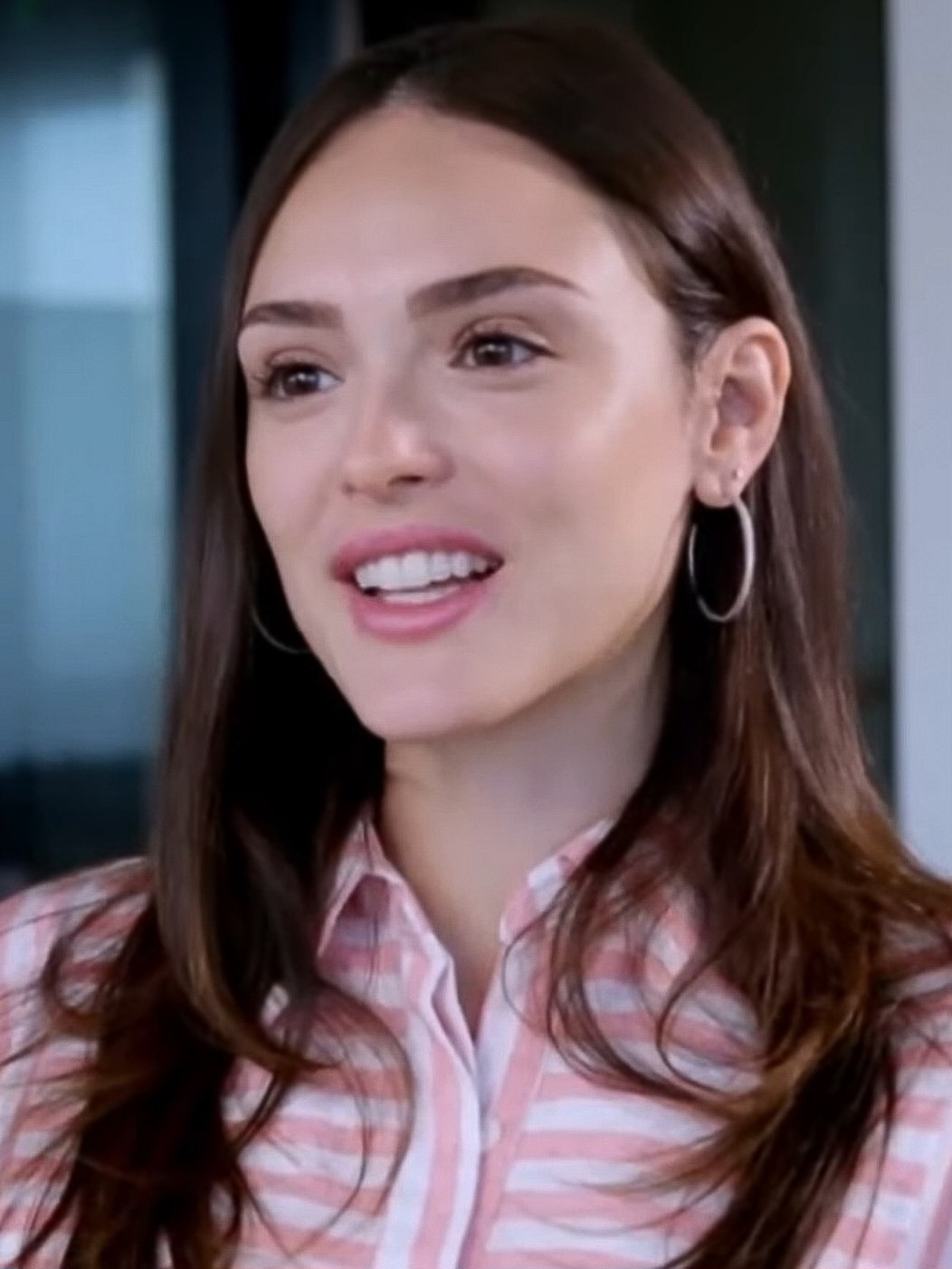
- Drummond in 2021
- Born: Isabelle Christine Lourenço Gomes Drummond; 12 April 1994 (age 32); Niterói, Rio de Janeiro, Brazil
- Occupation: Actress
- Years active: 2000–present

Isabelle Christine Lourenço Gomes Drummond (born 12 April 1994) is a Brazilian actress. She became known as a child actress when she played the rag doll Emília in the children's series Sítio do Picapau Amarelo, joining the cast for six consecutive years. Still on TV Globo, she continued to gain notoriety by starring in several prominent characters in telenovelas such as Bianca in Caras & Bocas, Cida in Cheias de Charme, Giane in Sangue Bom and Manuzita in Verão 90.

== Early life ==
Isabelle Drummond was born on 12 April 1994, and is the daughter of Damir Drummond and gas station manager Fernando Luiz Drummond Xavier, who was killed in February 2007 in Niterói, shot outside a bank. The actress is distantly related to the poet Carlos Drummond de Andrade.

== Career ==
Debuted on TV with a novel rapid participation in Laços de Família and on the series Linha Direta in 2000. In the same year she participated in the film Xuxa Popstar.

The following year, she played the small Rosicler, the daughter of Ana Paula Arósio character in the miniseries Os Maias. In the same year, became the show's child Sítio do Picapau Amarelo. as Emilia joining the cast for six consecutive years. Being nominated twice for the best of the year as best child actress.

In 2007, she played Gina in the telenovela Eterna Magia and in 2008 made a contribution of two chapters in the novel A Favorita. as Carla

in 2009 was the winner of the first season of Super Chefinhos and starred in the feature film Se Eu Fosse Você 2 playing the role of Bia, the daughter of the main couple, Tony Ramos and Gloria Pires, Cláudio and Helena respectively, girl pregnant early boyfriend who hid from his father.

In addition, she participated in several special year-end of the station and also starred in the special Rede Globo celebrating 40 years of the channel, A História de Rosa.

In 2009 and 2010, she played Bianca in Caras & Bocas, one of the main characters of the story. Her character exploded in the media and launched the slogans "É a Treva !", "Sou muito experiente", "Sou a rainha dos biscoitos de Polvilho", which fell to the popular taste. winning the Capricho award for "Best juvenile actress" and being nominated for the "Contigo Award".

In 2011, she was scheduled to join the cast of six novel Globo Cordel Encantado.

In 2012, she starred alongside actresses Taís Araújo and Leandra Leal in the telenovela Cheias de Charme.

In 2013, she starred in the telenovela Sangue Bom of Maria Adelaide Amaral and Vincent Villari, where she played Giane, a hardcore Corinthians fan.

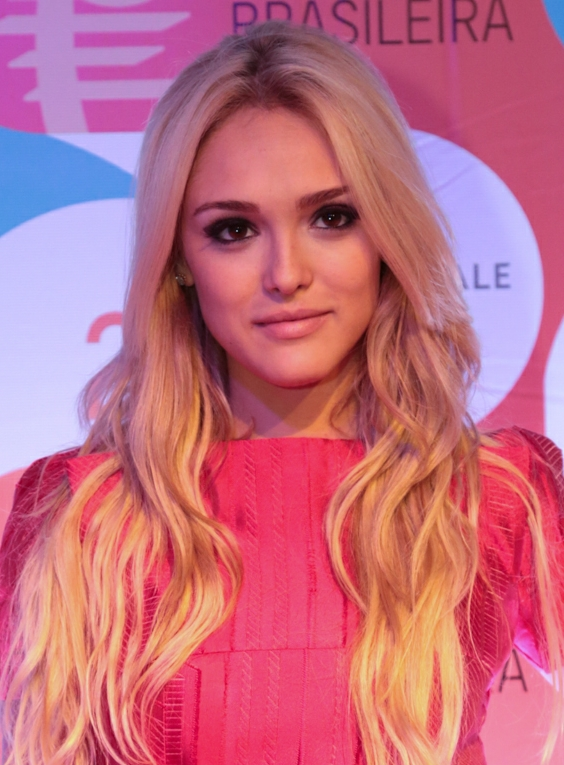
Drummond in 2014

In 2014, she played her third main role, as Megan in Geração Brasil, repeating the partnership with the authors Filipe Miguez and Izabel de Oliveira.

In 2015, she joined the cast of the soap opera Sete Vidas, alongside Jayme Matarazzo, Domingos Montagner and Débora Bloch. In 2016, she starred in the first phase of the soap opera A Lei do Amor, playing Heloísa. In 2017, she played the protagonist Anna Millman in the soap opera Novo Mundo. In 2019, she starred in the 7 p.m soap opera, Verão 90, playing the character Manuela Renata, "Manuzita". At the end of the 2010s, Isabelle starred in 6 soap operas in a row, being among the actresses who got the most prominent roles in the decade.

In 2021, Isabelle participated in the thirteen-episode series As Crianças Que Amamos, on Canal Viva, which features testimonials from actors who began their careers as children and continue in their artistic lives.

Still in 2021, Isabelle joined the live-action universe of Turma da Mônica as Tina in Turma da Mônica: Lições. In 2022, the comedy Minha Família Perfeita, a film directed by Felipe Joffily, starred Denise in cinemas.

Currently, Isabelle works as a producer and continues analyzing proposals as an actress.

== Philanthropy ==
Isabelle also created and is the leader of an NGO called Casa 197, which is dedicated to various social projects to help communities and people in need, support other entities and organize the distribution of meals to homeless people. In 2019, she called on some close friends to help her renovate the house of a humble family that was set on fire in the Rio city of Duque de Caxias. From then on, her social work was recognized by Forbes Brazil, which included her in the 30 Under 30 list, Third Sector category.

== Personal life ==
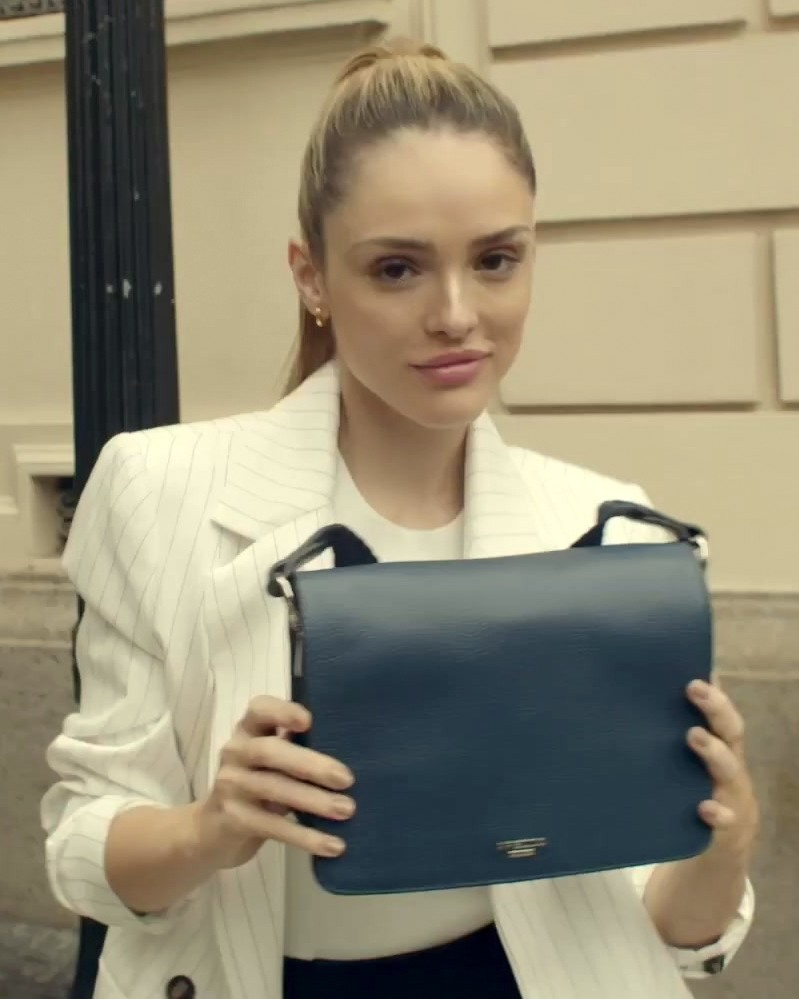
Drummond in an advertising campaign

Drummond is evangelical. In February 2014, she began dating singer Tiago Iorc, which only became official in April, at the launch party for the soap opera Geração Brasil. The relationship came to an end in September 2015, after almost two years together. In 2016, she became vegan for reasons of animal ideology. In 2016 and 2017, she opened an agency called HD7 and a healthy food delivery company called Levê Pocket.

Isabelle confirmed that she was related to the poet Carlos Drummond de Andrade, as Carlos was her paternal grandmother's cousin; "I don't know the level, I never went into this family research in depth. She exchanged several letters with him, my grandmother loves to write", revealed Isabelle.

On 22 November 2023, Isabelle was robbed in the South Zone of Rio. She was in Leblon when she was captured by the criminals. She, her friend and the driver were in the car, and their belongings were taken by four criminals. According to the actress's press office, "the car, an Audi, was not taken due to the thieves' inability to start the car." None of them suffered any type of aggression.

== Filmography ==
=== Television ===
Year	Title	Role	Notes
2000	Laços de Família	Pet shop customer	Cameo
2001	Linha Direta	Bento's daughter	Cameo
2001	Os Maias	Rosicler	Cameo
2001–2006	Sítio do Picapau Amarelo	Emília	Main role
2005	A História de Rosa	Young Rosa	Globo Special 40 Year
2007	Eterna Magia	Angelina "Gina" Ferreira O'Neill	
2008	A Favorita	Carla	Cameo
2009	Super Chefinhos	Herself	Season 1
2009–2010	Caras & Bocas	Bianca Bastos Conti da Silva	Main role
2011	Cordel Encantado	Rosa Alfredo Bezerra Ávila de Seráfia	Cameo
2012	Cheias de Charme	Maria Aparecida "Cida" dos Santos	Main role
2013	Sangue Bom	Giane de Souza	Main role
2014	Now Generation	Megan Lily Parker-Marra	Antagonist
2015	Sete Vidas	Júlias de Moraes Brandão	Main role
2016	A Lei do Amor	Heloísa "Helô" Martins	Main role (first phase)
2017	Novo Mundo	Anna Millman	Main role
2019	Verão 90	Manuela "Manuzita" Renata Andrade	Main role
2021	As Crianças Que Amamos	Herself	Episode: "Isabelle Drummond"
2026	Coração Acelerado	Naiane Sampaio Amaral	

=== Film ===
Year	Title	Role
2000	Xuxa Popstar	Ju
2009	Se Eu Fosse Você 2	Bia
2012	Rise of the Guardians	Tooth fairy (Brazilian voice dubbing)
2014	Amazonia	Gaia (Brazilian voice dubbing)
2015	As Aventuras do Pequeno Colombo	Mab
2018	Talvez uma História de Amor	Cíntia
2021	Turma da Mônica: Lições	Tina
2022	Minha Família Perfeita	Denise

== Internet ==
Year	Title	Role	Notes
2022	Novelei	Camila Lacerda Ferrari	Episode: "Laços de Família"

== Theater ==
Year	Title	Character
2004	Cosquinha	Girl
2024	Tina – Respeito	Tina

== Singles ==
Soundtrack

In November 2012, the DVD "Os Grandes Sucessos Musicais da Novela Cheias De Charme" was released, containing songs recorded by the protagonists, as well as appearances by the soap opera's cast and guest singers. In addition to participating in the DVD, Isabelle recorded on the Roberto Carlos Special Program, shown on 25 December 2012 where she sang along with other actresses and Roberto himself.

Title	Artist	Artist(s) extra(s)
Vida de Empreguete	Empreguetes	Leandra Leal and Taís Araújo
Maria Brasileira	Empreguetes	Leandra Leal and Taís Araújo
Forró das Curicas	Empreguetes	Leandra Leal and Taís Araújo
Nosso Brilho	Empreguetes	Leandra Leal and Taís Araújo
Cha Lá Lá	Empreguetes	Leandra Leal and Taís Araújo
Lê Lê Lê	Empreguetes	Leandra Leal Taís Araújo and João Neto & Frederico
Ex Mai Love	Empreguetes	Leandra Leal Taís Araújo Cláudia Abreu and Ricardo Tozzi
É Meu, É Meu, É Meu (The Mine Song)	Roberto Carlos and Empreguetes	Leandra Leal Taís Araújo Roberto Carlos Cláudia Abreu and Titina Medeiros

== Awards and nominations ==
Year	Ceremony	Category	Work nominated	Result
2001	Prêmio TV Press	New Revelation	Sítio do Picapau Amarelo	Won
2002	Prêmio Contigo! de TV	Best Child Actress	Sítio do Picapau Amarelo	Nominated
2002	Melhores do Ano	Best Child Actress	Sítio do Picapau Amarelo	Nominated
2002	Prêmio Master	Child Revelation	Sítio do Picapau Amarelo	Won
2002	Prêmio Austregésilo de Athayde	Child Revelation	Sítio do Picapau Amarelo	Won
2003	Melhores do Ano	Best Child Actress	Sítio do Picapau Amarelo	Nominated
2008	Prêmio Contigo! de TV	Best Child Actress	Eterna Magia	Nominated
2009	Capricho Awards	Best National Teen Actress	Caras & Bocas	Won
2009	Prêmio Extra de Televisão	Supporting Actress	Caras & Bocas	Nominated
2010	Troféu Imprensa	Revelation Of the Year	Caras & Bocas	Nominated
2010	Prêmio Contigo! de TV	Best Telenovela Actress	Caras & Bocas	Nominated
2012	Prêmio Extra de Televisão	Teen Idol	Cheias de Charme	Won
2012	Capricho Awards	Best National Actress	Cheias de Charme	Nominated
2013	Prêmio Contigo! de TV	Best Telenovela Actress	Cheias de Charme	Nominated
2013	Meus Prêmios Nick	Favorite Actress	Sangue Bom	Nominated
2014	Prêmio Contigo! de TV	Best Telenovela Actress	Sangue Bom	Nominated
2014	Meus Prêmios Nick	Favorite Actress	Now Generation	Nominated
2014	Meus Prêmios Nick	Pretty Girl Of the Year	Herself	Won
2019	Troféu AIB de Imprensa	Best Actress	Verão 90	Nominated
2022	Festival Sesc Melhores Filmes	Best National Actress	Turma da Mônica: Lições	Nominated
