= Now Generation =

Brazilian television series

- Genre: Telenovela; Science fiction
- Created by: Filipe Miguez; Izabel de Oliveira
- Directed by: Denise Saraceni; Maria de Médicis; Natália Grimberg
- Starring: Murilo Benício; Cláudia Abreu; Chandelly Braz; Humberto Carrão; Taís Araújo; Renata Sorrah; Isabelle Drummond; Ricardo Tozzi; Lázaro Ramos; Luís Miranda; Fiuk; Leandro Hassum; Titina Medeiros; Joaquim Lopes; Aracy Balabanian see more
- Opening theme: "País do Futebol" by MC Guimê
- Country of origin: Brazil
- Original language: Portuguese
- No. of episodes: 155 (105 international version)

Production
- Running time: 50 minutes

Original release
- Network: TV Globo
- Release: 5 May – 31 October 2014

Now Generation (Portuguese: Geração Brasil; stylized as G3R4Ç4O BR4S1L; literally "Brazil Generation") is a Brazilian telenovela produced and broadcast by TV Globo. It was created by Filipe Miguez and Izabel de Oliveira. The series discussed topics and issues surrounding technology usage, such as open-source software, drones, and programming as part of an education system.

The series starred Murilo Benício, Cláudia Abreu, Chandelly Braz, Humberto Carrão, Taís Araújo, Isabelle Drummond, Ricardo Tozzi, Luís Miranda, Lázaro Ramos, and Renata Sorrah. Geração Brasil's. The writers were advised by academics and consultants, such as Ronaldo Lemos and Hermano Vianna.

== Plot ==
Jonas Marra (Murilo Benício) is a Brazilian computer engineer and entrepreneur who lives in Silicon Valley, California. He left Brazil at a very young age in search of financing for his invention called The Brow, which is a low-cost computer that eventually revolutionized the global computer industry during the 1980s.

Once in the United States, Jonas created the Marra Corporation. Along with Marra's professional success, he married Pamela Parker (Claudia Abreu), who was an America's sweetheart and heir to the largest TV channel in the country.

For 20 years, Marra ran his company and lived happily with his family. The couple raised a daughter, Megan (Isabelle Drummond). Megan was the biological daughter of Pamela and her past boyfriend, a French playboy killed in a car accident before Megan was born. She was, however, more of a wild, rebellious girl and her controversial escapades are daily fixtures of the gossip newspapers. Marra and his wife had to work hard keeping Megan out of trouble.

Through the years Marra became an icon, and his position and decisions within the tech industry had never been questioned. However, one day, Marra Corporation's shareholders decided that the company needed new talents to allow themselves to cope and compete in a rapidly changing tech industry. For this purpose, they requested that Marra would retire.

After this announcement, Jonas, drawing from his vast 42 years of experience, transferred the Marra Corporation headquarters to Brazil. The decision became headline news from around the world. In a move that further shocked the world, Marra revealed that he would search for a computer engineering genius in his home country to become his successor.

Meanwhile, in Rio de Janeiro, the young Davi (Humberto Carrão) was working hard to gain traction for his project. Like Jonas, he was also of humble origins and believed that access to information should be democratized. Thus, he created Junior, a tool that taught computer programming. All the inspiration for the invention came from Plugar, an NGO dedicated to the digital inclusion of disadvantaged children, located in Gambiarra, a fictitious district of Rio's West Zone. Through Plugar, Davi had his first contact with a computer, where he began teaching himself computer engineering. Davi also wanted to create better opportunities for children to learn about technology, so he developed the ABC of computer programming with Herval, founder of Plugar.

In Recife, in search of so-called "angels", Davi packed a bag with Junior looking for a chance to show it off to investors. Upon arrival at Recife Digital Davi knows Manu (Chandelly Braz), beautiful recifense, and very much skilled in computer and games. It is in the world of games that the two will be closer than they might think. Behind their avatars and nicknames, they will be impressed with the opponent's skills, not realizing who is on the other side of the screen. The two will be very close when they are selected to participate in the Marra Brazil contest. With over 12 young people, Davi and Manu will go through several technological challenges, having to prove their capabilities to Jonas. In the final bout, Manu and Davi had to face each other in creating a killer app. Breaking rules and by now in love, the two have a single project, putting Jonas against the wall: either hire the two, or hire neither.

Angry with the handling and amazed at the ability of the duo, Jonas proposes an extra challenge: their app will have to blow up within the short deadline until the final stage of the competition.

== Cast ==
Actor/Actress	Character
Murilo Benício	Jonas Marra
Cláudia Abreu	Pamela Parker-Marra
Chandelly Braz	Manuela Yanes (Manu)
Humberto Carrão	Davi Reis
Renata Sorrah	Gláucia Beatriz Pacheco Marra
Taís Araújo	Verônica Monteiro
Isabelle Drummond	Megan Lily Parker-Marra
Ricardo Tozzi	Herval Domingues
Luís Miranda	Dorothy Benson
Luís Miranda	Dorival Benson
Lázaro Ramos	Brian Roberto Benson
Gisele Fróes	Rita de Cássia Ferreira
Luiz Carlos Vasconcelos	Frederico Yanes (Fred)
Luís Carlos Miele	Jack Parker
Aracy Balabanian	Iracema Avelar
Leandro Hassum	Haroldo Barata Filho (Barata)
Titina Medeiros	Marisa Pinto Marra
Luis Henrique Nogueira	Sílvio Pacheco Marra
Rodrigo Pandolfo	Shin-Soo
Mônica Torres	Susana Avelar
Miguel Roncato	Danilo Pinto Marra
Débora Nascimento	María Vergara
Fiuk	Alex Torres
Joaquim Lopes	Domênico Navarro
Felipe Abib	Ernesto Avelar
Marcello Airoldi	Elias Avelar
André Gonçalves	Mário Aparecido dos Santos (Cidão)
Nando Cunha	Dante Ferreira
Samuel Vieira	Igor Yanes
Max Lima	Vicente Monteiro
Ana Terra Blanco	Luene Michelle Almeida (Lu N)
Débora Lamm	Edna Bentes
Ellen Rocche	Ludmila Santini
Arlindo Lopes	Devendra Ananda (Murphy)
Isabel Wilker	Evangelina Rosa
Bernardo Marinho	Vander Soares
Danilo Santos Ferreira	Matias Ferreira
Valentina Bandeira	Danusa Pinto Marra
Elisa Pinheiro	Lara Avelar
Theodoro Cochrane	Gaspar Cardoso
Fagundes Emanuel	Ubirajara Soares Filho (Mosca)
Jéssica Ellen	Alice Romão
Johnny Hooker	Thales Salgado
Julia Konrad	Janaína Lima (Jana)
Marília Martins	Débora
Nado Grimberg	Pereira (Tommy Lee)
Susana Ribeiro	Sandra Schmidt
Andréa Dantas	Valdeci
David Júnior	Tonhão (Will Smith)
Juliana Martins	Joana Sá (Jojo)
Cláudio Mendes	Leonel Moreira
Fabio Neppo	Ubirajara Soares (Bira)
Antônio Fragoso	Edimilson Rocha
Thiago de Los Reyes	Zac Vírus
Flávio Pardal	Bóris Roma
Pedro Inoue	Fabrício San Marino
Laura Prado	Tatiana Furtado
Larissa Murai	Hana Massuda
Gabriel Palhares	Tomás Avelar
Gustavo Henzel	Adriano Almeida
Felipe Kannenberg	Solano Pimentel
Emílio de Mello	Professor Fernando
Daisy Lúcidi	Madalena (Madá)
Lady Francisco	Marlene
Tuninho Menucci	Vesgo
Matheus Pinto	Eliéser
Sérgio Maciel	Nacho González
Alexandre Davi	Caolho
Mitsu Kusume	Hélio Miura
Manuela Simões	Dora

== Guest stars ==
Actor/Actress	Character
Grazi Massafera	Jéssica Malta
Thiaguinho	Himself
Dudu Azevedo	Arthur
Lucinha Araújo	Herself / Cazuza's mother
Fernanda Souza	Herself
Marcius Melhem	Gino D'Agostini
Jacqueline Laurence	Bérénice (Megan's French grandmother)
