= Rio Belongs to Us =

2013 film directed by Ricardo Pretti

- Theatrical poster
- Directed by: Ricardo Pretti
- Written by: Ricardo Pretti
- Starring: Leandra Leal; Jiddu Pinheiro; Mariana Ximenes
- Cinematography: Ivo Lopes Araújo
- Edited by: Guto Parente; Luiz Pretti
- Production companies: Alumbramento; Daza Cultural; TB Produções
- Distributed by: Canal Brasil
- Release date: 26 January 2013 (IFFR)
- Running time: 75 minutes
- Country: Brazil
- Language: Portuguese

Rio Belongs to Us (Portuguese: O Rio nos Pertence!) is a 2013 Brazilian drama-thriller film written and directed by Ricardo Pretti, starring Leandra Leal, Mariana Ximenes and Jiddu Pinheiro. It premiered at the 42nd International Film Festival Rotterdam.

The film is part of the "Operation Sonia Silk", a series of three feature-length films produced cooperatively, with the same cast and crew, co-produced by Canal Brasil and Teleimage.

== Plot ==
After receiving a strange postcard, Marina, a 30-year-old woman, decides to return to Rio de Janeiro, her hometown, after an absence of 10 years. Marina doesn't know exactly why: she searches responses for the strange happenings, but everything appears to be increasingly confused.

== Cast ==
- Leandra Leal as Marina
- Jiddu Pinheiro as Mauro
- Mariana Ximenes
