= Harmonica's Howl =

2013 film directed by Bruno Safadi

- Theatrical poster
- Directed by: Bruno Safadi
- Written by: Bruno Safadi
- Starring: Mariana Ximenes; Leandra Leal; Jiddu Pinheiro
- Cinematography: Ivo Lopes Araújo
- Edited by: Guto Parente; Luiz Pretti
- Production companies: Alumbramento; Daza Cultural; TB Produções
- Distributed by: Canal Brasil
- Release date: 26 January 2013 (IFFR)
- Running time: 72 minutes
- Country: Brazil
- Language: Portuguese

Harmonica's Howl (Portuguese: O Uivo da Gaita) is a 2013 Brazilian drama film directed by Bruno Safadi. It stars Mariana Ximenes, Leandra Leal and Jiddu Pinheiro. The film premiered at the 42nd International Film Festival Rotterdam.

The film is part of the "Operation Sonia Silk", a series of three feature-length films produced cooperatively, with the same cast and crew, co-produced by Canal Brasil and Teleimage. It tells the story of Antônia and Pedro, a couple that is facing problems in the relationship after the arrival of Luana. The two women fall in love and live a love story.

== Cast ==
- Mariana Ximenes as Antônia
- Leandra Leal as Luana
- Jiddu Pinheiro as Pedro

== Production ==
=== Filming ===
Filming took place in Rio de Janeiro, shooting locations included the port of Rio de Janeiro, the Casa das Canoas designed by Oscar Niemeyer and a beach in Niterói.
