= Minha Família Perfeita =

2022 film directed by Felipe Joffily

- Directed by: Felipe Joffily
- Written by: Leandro Matos; Saulo Aride
- Starring: Isabelle Drummond; Rafael Infante; Julia Dalavia
- Production companies: Telecine; Total Entertainment
- Distributed by: Buena Vista International
- Release date: September 8, 2022
- Country: Brazil
- Language: Portuguese

Minha Família Perfeita is 2022 Brazilian comedy film, directed by Felipe Joffily and starring Isabelle Drummond and Rafael Infante, based in a foreign script.

The movie was released theatrically in Brazil on September 8, 2022 by Walt Disney Studios Motion Pictures under the Buena Vista International label.

== Plot ==
Fred is a successful advertising to search for the woman of your dreams. One day he meets Denise, who after some time together, accepts only be sought in marriage after meeting Fred's relatives, which is ashamed to present his eccentric Italian family. No choice, he makes a date in their work, but Denise confuses the actors of an advertisement by Fred 's family, who hires them to represent them . But he did not expect the new family would be worse to deal with than his real family.

== Cast ==
- Isabelle Drummond as Denise
- Rafael Infante as Fred
- Julia Dalavia as Debora
