= Dhu Moraes =

Brazilian actress and singer (born 1953)

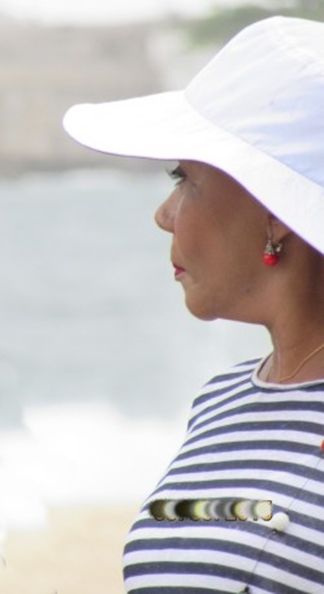
- Moraes in 2015
- Born: Dulcilene Moraes; 22 January 1953 (age 73); Rio de Janeiro, Brazil
- Other name: Dudu Moraes
- Occupations: Actress; singer
- Years active: 1970–present
- Known for: Tia Nastácia in Sítio do Picapau Amarelo
- Spouse: Carlos Alberto Carvalho (m. 1980; div. 2007)

Dulcilene Moraes (born 22 January 1953 in Rio de Janeiro), known professionally as Dhu Moraes, is a Brazilian actress and singer. She began her career using the stage name Dudu Moraes, later adopting the name Dhu Moraes.

She was member of the vocal group As Frenéticas and also member of the groups Mucamas do Painho and Radio Stars, both consequences of her participations in programs of Chico Anysio, Chico Anysio Show. In the 1970s, beyond having taken part of the producing of the Hair, took part of a group "Sublimes", inspired in The Supremes. From 2001 until 2006, she represented the character Tia Nastácia in the series Sítio do Picapau Amarelo of Rede Globo.

== Filmography ==
=== Television ===
Year	Title	Role	Notes
1970	Irmãos Coragem	Helena "Leninha"	
1985	Tenda dos Milagres	Rosa de Oxalá	
1985	Roque Santeiro	Dona Maricota	
1986	Sinhá Moça	Maria das Dores	Guest star
1991	Escolinha do Professor Raimundo	Baunilha	
1994	Escolinha do Professor Raimundo	Maria Menina	
2000	Você Decide	Cida	Episode: "Transas de Família: Parte 5"
2001	O Direito de Nascer	Mamãe Dolores	
2001–2006	Sítio do Picapau Amarelo	Tia Nastácia	
2004	A Diarista	Herself	Episode: "Aquele do Projac"
2007	Luz do Sol	Neusa	
2009	Caras & Bocas	Dirce Nunes Paiva	
2011	Morde & Assopra	Janice	
2012	Cheias de Charme	Valdelice Araújo "Valda"	
2016	Êta Mundo Bom!	Manuela dos Santos	
2017	Novo Mundo	Idalina	
2022–present	Encantado's	Marlene Ponza	
2023	Amor Perfeito	Carminha Laranjeira	Guest star
2025–2026	Êta Mundo Melhor!	Manuela dos Santos	
