= Novo Mundo (TV series) =

Brazilian period telenovela

- Genre: Telenovela; Period drama
- Created by: Thereza Falcão; Alessandro Marson
- Directed by: Vinícius Coimbra
- Starring: Isabelle Drummond; Chay Suede; Letícia Colin; Gabriel Braga Nunes; Ingrid Guimarães; Caio Castro; Vivianne Pasmanter; Agatha Moreira; Rodrigo Simas; Caco Ciocler; Júlia Lemmertz; Ricardo Pereira
- Opening theme: "Novo Mundo" (instrumental) by Sacha Amback
- Country of origin: Brazil
- Original language: Portuguese
- No. of episodes: 160

Production
- Production location: Rio de Janeiro
- Camera setup: Multi-camera
- Running time: 33–41 minutes
- Production company: Entretenimento Globo

Original release
- Network: Rede Globo
- Release: 22 March – 25 September 2017

Related
- Nos Tempos do Imperador

Novo Mundo (English: New World) is a Brazilian telenovela produced and broadcast by TV Globo. It is created by Alessandro Marson and Thereza Falcão, and directed by Vinícius Coimbra. It premiered on 22 March 2017 replacing Sol Nascente, ran for twenty-seven weeks, with a total of 160 episodes and ended its run on 25 September 2017.

Isabelle Drummond and Chay Suede portray the protagonists of the plot; Drummond plays an English teacher Anna and Suede portrays a Portuguese-Brazilian actor Joaquim, both fell in love in Europe and find themselves again in Brazil, where they decide to fight for their love, having to face obstacles from an officer that she possessively wants her and a false marriage with a Portuguese actress. The cast also features Gabriel Braga Nunes, Ingrid Guimarães, Agatha Moreira, Vivianne Pasmanter, Guilherme Piva, César Cardadeiro, Caio Castro and Letícia Colin.

The story of Novo Mundo continues in the 2021 telenovela Nos Tempos do Imperador.

== Plot ==
Set in 1817, Anna Millman (Isabelle Drummond) is an English woman who teaches Portuguese who gets involved with the Portuguese-Brazilian actor Joaquim Martinho (Chay Suede) as both travel to Brazil in the ship that brings Archduchess Maria Leopoldina of Austria (Letícia Colin) to her bethroted, Prince Pedro (Caio Castro). Despite their love for each other, they suffer from the threats of Thomas Johnson (Gabriel Braga Nunes), an English officer who wants to have Anna for himself, and Elvira (Ingrid Guimarães), a Portuguese actress in a fake marriage with Joaquim, causing her to flee from the shrew when entering the ship that would leave for Brazil. The telenovela also features Brazil's struggle for independence.

== Cast ==
Actor	Character
Isabelle Drummond	Anna Millman
Chay Suede	Joaquim Martinho
Caio Castro	Prince Pedro, later Emperor Pedro I
Letícia Colin	Princess Maria Leopoldina, later Empress Maria Leopoldina
Ingrid Guimarães	Elvira Matamouros
Gabriel Braga Nunes	Thomas Johnson
Léo Jaime	King João VI
Débora Olivieri	Queen Carlota Joaquina
Rodrigo Simas	Piatã
Giullia Buscacio	Jacira
Agatha Moreira	Domitila de Castro, Marchioness of Santos
Rômulo Estrela	Francisco Gomes da Silva (Chalaça)
Luisa Micheletti	Noémi Thierry
Vivianne Pasmanter	Germana
Guilherme Piva	Licurgo
Felipe Camargo	José Bonifácio
Sheron Menezzes	Diara
Jonas Bloch	Wolfgang
Júlia Lemmertz	Greta
Vanessa Gerbelli	Maria Amália
Daniel Dantas	Padre Olinto
Leopoldo Pacheco	Fred Sem Alma
Paulo Rocha	Jorge de Avilez
Joana Solnado	Dulcina
Ricardo Pereira	Ferdinando
Maria João Bastos	Letícia
Caco Ciocler	Peter
Larissa Bracher	Benedita
Dhu Moraes	Idalina
Babu Santana	Jacinto
Bruce Gomlevsky	Felício
Isabella Dragão	Cecília
Felipe Silcler	Libério
Renan Monteiro	Matias
Jurema Reis	Jurema
Allan Souza Lima	Ubirajara
Thiago Thomé	Hassan
Luana Tanaka	Miss Liu
Márcia Cabrita	Narcisa

== Soundtrack ==
Novo Mundo - Instrumental

Soundtrack album by Various artists
- Released: 13 April 2017
- Label: Som Livre

No.	Title	Artist(s)	Length
1.	"Abertura Novo Mundo"	Sacha Amback	1:03
2.	"Anna"	Sacha Amback	2:43
3.	"Anna Iluminada (Versão Suspense)"	Sacha Amback	1:15
4.	"Anna Iluminada"	Sacha Amback	2:04
5.	"Joaquim"	Sacha Amback	2:11
6.	"Paixão de Anna e Joaquim"	Sacha Amback	2:15
7.	"Leopoldina"	Sacha Amback	1:59
8.	"Pedro"	Rafael Langoni	3:40
9.	"Sir Thomas"	Sacha Amback	3:29
10.	"Elvira"	Rafael Langoni	1:18
11.	"Piatã"	Sacha Amback	2:01
12.	"Cantiga de Amália"	Sacha Amback	1:54
13.	"Trovão"	Sacha Amback	1:39
14.	"Amor"	Sacha Amback	2:34
15.	"Piratas"	Sacha Amback	1:57
16.	"Taberna Primeiro Movimento"	Sacha Amback	2:01
17.	"Taberna Terceiro Movimento"	Sacha Amback	1:00
18.	"Domitila"	Rafael Langoni	1:35
19.	"Sir Thomas (Versão Suspense)"	Sacha Amback	1:31
20.	"Anna (Versão Piano)"	Sacha Amback	2:36
21.	"Índios 1"	Marcos Suzano and Carlos Malta	2:16
22.	"O Oceano"	Rafael Langoni	2:09
23.	"A Terra"	Rafael Langoni	2:29
24.	"Anna Iluminada (Versão Piano)"	Sacha Amback	2:15
25.	"Tänze Des Brassilianischen Ballfestes"	Rafael Langoni	12:16
26.	"Meu Amor Marinheiro (bonus track)"	Carminho	3:04
Total length:			1:04:15

== Reception ==
=== Ratings ===
Timeslot (ATZ)	# Ep.	Premiered		Ended		TV season	Rank	Average viewership
Timeslot (ATZ)	# Ep.	Date	Viewers (in points)	Date	Viewers (in points)	TV season	Rank	Average viewership
Monday—Saturday 6:20 p.m.	160	22 March 2017	23	25 September 2017	29	2017	TBA	23.80

Preceded by Sol Nascente; 29 August 2016–21 March 2017	Globo 6 p.m. timeslot telenovela 22 March 2017–25 September 2017	Succeeded by Tempo de Amar; 26 September 2017–19 March 2018
