= Fala Sério, Mãe! =

2017 film directed by Pedro Vasconcelos

- Directed by: Pedro Vasconcelos
- Written by: Dostoiewski Champangnatte; Paulo Cursino; Ingrid Guimarães
- Produced by: André Carreira
- Starring: Ingrid Guimarães; Larissa Manoela; Marcelo Laham; João Guilherme Ávila
- Distributed by: Downtown Filmes; Paris Filmes
- Release date: December 28, 2017 (Brazil)
- Running time: 79 minutes
- Country: Brazil
- Language: Portuguese
- Box office: $11,616,161

Fala Sério, Mãe! is a 2017 Brazilian comedy film, directed by Pedro Vasconcelos, starring Ingrid Guimarães, Larissa Manoela, Marcelo Laham and João Guilherme Ávila.

== Plot ==
Ângela Cristina (Ingrid Guimarães), mother of teenager Maria de Lourdes (Larissa Manoela), has to deal with the difficulties and delights of guiding her daughter during one of the most complicated stages of life.

== Cast ==
- Ingrid Guimarães as Ângela Cristina Siqueira Paz
- Larissa Manoela as Maria de Lourdes Siqueira Paz (Malu)
  - Vitória Magalhães as Maria de Lourdes (10 years old)
  - Duda Batista as Maria de Lourdes (5 years old)
- Marcelo Laham as Armando Paz
- João Guilherme Ávila as Nando
- Kaik Brum as Mário Márcio Siqueira Paz
  - Raphael Tomé as Mário Márcio Siqueira Paz (4 years old)
- Carolina Dumani as Malena Siqueira Paz
- Giovanna Rispoli as Alice
- Cristina Pereira as Fátima Paz
- Luisa Bastos as Luna
- Sofia Leão as Sofia
- Catherine Beranger as Aline
- Thalita Rebouças as Store owner
- Júlio Calasso as Seu Edgar
- Fábio Júnior as himself
- Paulo Gustavo as himself

== Reception ==
After three weeks, Fala Sério, Mãe! reached the mark of 2 million spectators. In total the film surpassed the mark of 3 million spectators, being a success in box office.
