= Mister Brau =

- Genre: Comedy; Musical
- Created by: Jorge Furtado
- Directed by: Maurício Farias
- Starring: Lázaro Ramos; Taís Araújo; Fernanda de Freitas; George Sauma; Luís Miranda; Kiko Mascarenhas; Cláudia Missura; Guta Stresser; Leonardo Lima; Brunna Oliveira; Sérgio Rufino
- Opening theme: "Meu Nome é Brau" by Lázaro Ramos (seasons 1–3); "Meu Nome é Brau e Eu Sou Michele Brau" by Lázaro Ramos & Taís Araújo (season 4)
- Country of origin: Brazil
- Original language: Portuguese
- No. of seasons: 4
- No. of episodes: 54

Production
- Production location: Brasília
- Running time: 32–45 minutes

Original release
- Network: Rede Globo
- Release: 22 September 2015 – 12 June 2018

Mister Brau is a Brazilian musical comedy television series created by Jorge Furtado that originally aired from 22 September 2015 to 12 June 2018, on Rede Globo. The series aired over four seasons with a total of 54 episodes and 3 specials. The series centers on the two leads: Lázaro Ramos and Taís Araújo.

== Premise ==
The plot revolves around a popular singer, Mr. Brau (Lázaro Ramos) and his wife Michele (Taís Araújo), a businesswoman and his choreographer. Michelle alludes to the fact that, "behind a great man has a great woman".

Mister Brau and Michele also value what is priceless: friendship. He remains faithful to Lima (Luis Miranda), his partner and adviser since the beginning of his career, and Michele relies on Gomes (Kiko Mascarenhas), her advisor, butler and personal advisor.

== Cast ==
- Lázaro Ramos as Mister (Mr.) Brau / Braulio
- Taís Araújo as Michele Maria Brau
- Fernanda de Freitas as Andréia Tolledo de Menezes
- George Sauma as Henrique Tolledo de Menezes
- Luís Miranda as Lima
- Kiko Mascarenhas as Fernando Gomes
- Cláudia Missura as Catarina
- Marcelo Flores as Lieutenant Marques
- Leonardo Lima as Egídio Brau
- Brunna Oliveira as Lia Brau
- Sérgio Rufino as Carlito Brau
- Fernanda Montenegro as Mrs. Rosita Gomes
