= Cheias de Charme =

Brazilian telenovela

- Also known as: Sparkling Girls; Encantadoras
- Genre: Telenovela; Musical; Comedy drama
- Created by: Filipe Miguez; Izabel de Oliveira
- Directed by: Denise Saraceni
- Starring: Taís Araújo; Leandra Leal; Isabelle Drummond; Cláudia Abreu; Ricardo Tozzi; Malu Galli; Marcos Palmeira; Jonatas Faro; Humberto Carrão; Bruno Mazzeo; Tato Gabus Mendes; Alexandra Richter; Simone Gutierrez; Rodrigo Pandolfo; Giselle Batista
- Opening theme: "Ex Mai Love" by Gaby Amarantos
- Country of origin: Brazil
- Original language: Portuguese
- No. of episodes: 143

Production
- Editors: Ubiraci de Motta; Carlos Roberto Mendes; José Carlos Monteiro; Rodrigo Clemente
- Running time: 45 minutes

Original release
- Network: TV Globo
- Release: 16 April – 28 September 2012

Cheias de Charme (English: Sparkling Girls) is a Brazilian musical telenovela produced and broadcast by TV Globo. It premiered on 16 April 2012 and ran for 143 episodes, with the finale airing on 28 September 2012, replacing Aquele Beijo and preceding Guerra dos Sexos.

It is created and written by Filipe Miguez, Izabel de Oliveira in collaboration with Daisy Chaves, Isabel Muniz, João Brandão, Lais Mendes Pimentel, Paula Amaral and Sérgio Marques. The telenovela is directed by Allan Fiterman, Maria de Médicis, Natália Grimberg and Denise Saraceni.

Features performances by Taís Araújo, Cláudia Abreu, Leandra Leal, Isabelle Drummond, Ricardo Tozzi, Malu Galli, Marcos Palmeira and Jonatas Faro.

== Plot ==
The plot tells the story of three maids - Maria da Penha, Maria Aparecida (Cida) and Maria do Rosario who, by luck or talent, will change their lot. Penha is a 34-year-old woman, hardworking, who raised her siblings Alana and Elano, after their parents abandoned them. Penha is wife of Sandro, a trickster who does not want to work and is addicted to football. Penha and Sandro have a son, little Patrick. Penha works as a maid in the house of the singer Chayene, an eletroforró tecnobrega diva and bitter woman who has a bad phase, this she attributes to a nonexistent overweight. Chayene is an evil woman who mistreats all her employees. One day Chayene physically assaults Penha, after she accidentally burned her dress. Penha goes to the police station to report the employer.

Rosario is a cook, who dreams of being a singer and is passionate about singer Fabian. She finally gets to go to one of his shows, but gets into tremendous trouble. The singer's bodyguards catch her and take her to the police station. Rosario knows Inácio, a simple man, who looks exactly like Fabian, and therefore hates him. Inácio suffers from being confused with the singer by his crazy fans. Rosario falls for him. But Inácio just wants to have a family, and doesn't endorse Rosario's dream of being a singer.

Cida is a 19-year-old girl who lives with her godmother, Valda, in her employer's house, Sônia, a rich woman rich married to Ernani. She has two daughters: Ariela and Isadora. Cida's mother, Dolores, was Sônia's maid, before she died. Cida and her godmother work as domestic servants and are very mistreated by employers. Cida catches her boyfriend, Rodinei, with another woman in a nightclub and gets into trouble. She is also taken to the police station.

Penha, Cida and Rosario end up in jail for contempt. They meet in jail and sympathize with each other. The three maids make a pact: "Employee by day, lady by night." Rosario will work in Chayene's house instead of Penha. Penha in turn, will work for Lygia, a good hearted lawyer. Cida falls for Conrado Werneck, a rich man without character, who doesn't know she is an employee. Isadora arrives from travelling, and Conrado discovers the entire truth. Isadora is bad and envious and plans to separate Cida from Conrado and stay with him, which proves successful as Conrado and Isadora later get married. Despite his love for Cida, Conrado marries Isadora only to please his father, Otto. Cida suffers greatly at the hands of her employers, especially with Sônia and Isadora, who humiliate her constantly. Mother and daughter are the villains of her story. Ariela is the eldest daughter of Sônia and being overweight tries several crazy diets. Ariela is engaged to Humberto, and is somewhat snobbish and thus a comical villain.

One day, Rosario called Penha and Cida to Chayene's house, while her employer is outside. The three decide to have fun and with the help of Kleiton, create a song "Vida de Empreguete." There, the video clip is shot, with the girls using Chayene's clothes. The clip is a success and they decided to form a band, "Empreguetes." They write new songs like "Marias Brasileiras", "Forro das Curicas" among others. The Empreguetes start being more and more successful, which excites the entrepreneur Tom Bastos and Fabian, who wants, at all costs, to separate Rosario and Inácio. The success of Empreguetes also arouses the envy of Chayene, who with the help of her maid, Socorro, is obsessed with the singers and will make all the she can to harm the trio.

As the trio becomes more and more famous, Chayene becomes less famous and always lands into trouble but with the help of Laércio, her assistant, she always finds a way out. Her lack of success is due to the harm that she tries to inflict on them.

After Penha, Rosario and Cida become popular, surprising events begin to occur.

Valda reveals to Ernani Sarmento that Cida is his daughter after he becomes broke when his company collapses due to Conrado's malice. When Cida finds out about this, she is in pain at first but, later rejoices over it. She moves in with the broke Sarmento's while her apartment is being renovated. During one night, Cida encounters Conrado on her way to the kitchen and Conrad kisses her. Unfortunately, Isadora catches them and is dismayed. Conrado leaves the house immediately but before he does, he acknowledges that he is still in love with Cida. Isadora becomes furious and gets revenge by tearing all of Cida's clothes and steals her credit card and goes shopping with her mother. When Cida finds out that her card was stolen, she wants to put them behind bars but Ernani doesn't let her do so. She instead turns Isadora and Sônia into maids.

She brings in changes and this includes letting her godmother, Valda, be treated as a guest. Her move into the Sarmento house brings much dismay to Olano, who is in love with Cida and thinks that she moves there to be with Conrado.

== Release ==
Reruns are currently airing on TV Globo.

== Cast ==
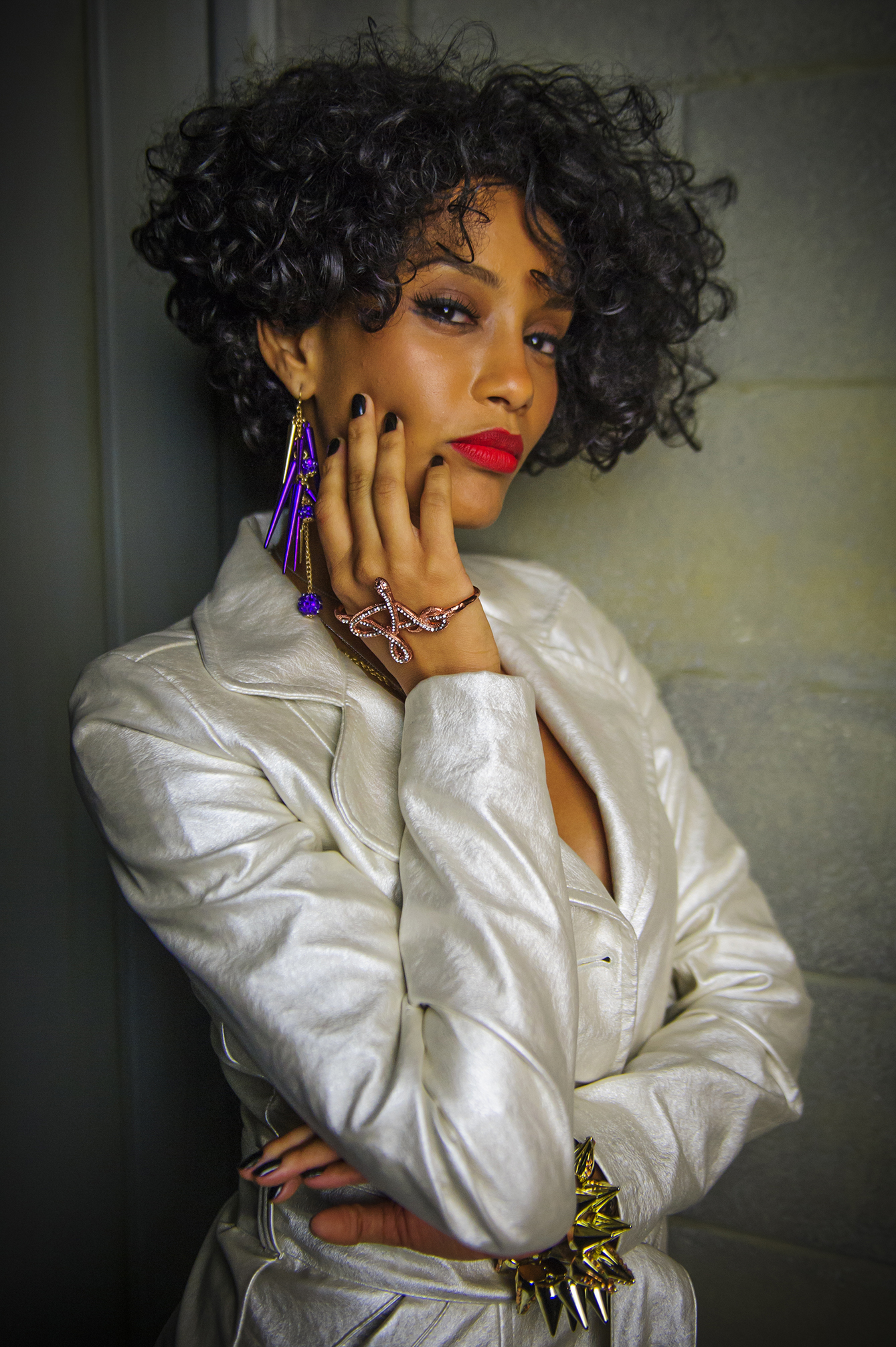
Taís Araújo as Penha Fragoso.

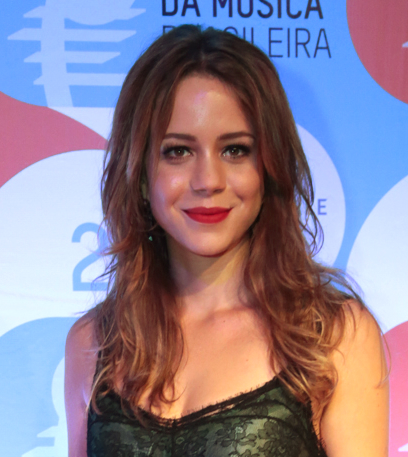
Leandra Leal as Rosário Monteiro.

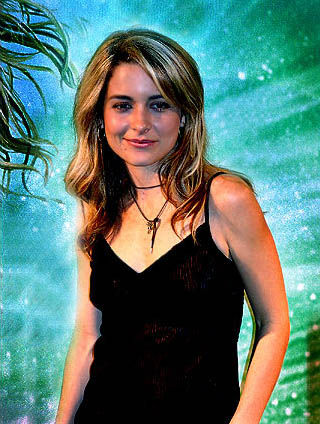
Cláudia Abreu as Chayene.

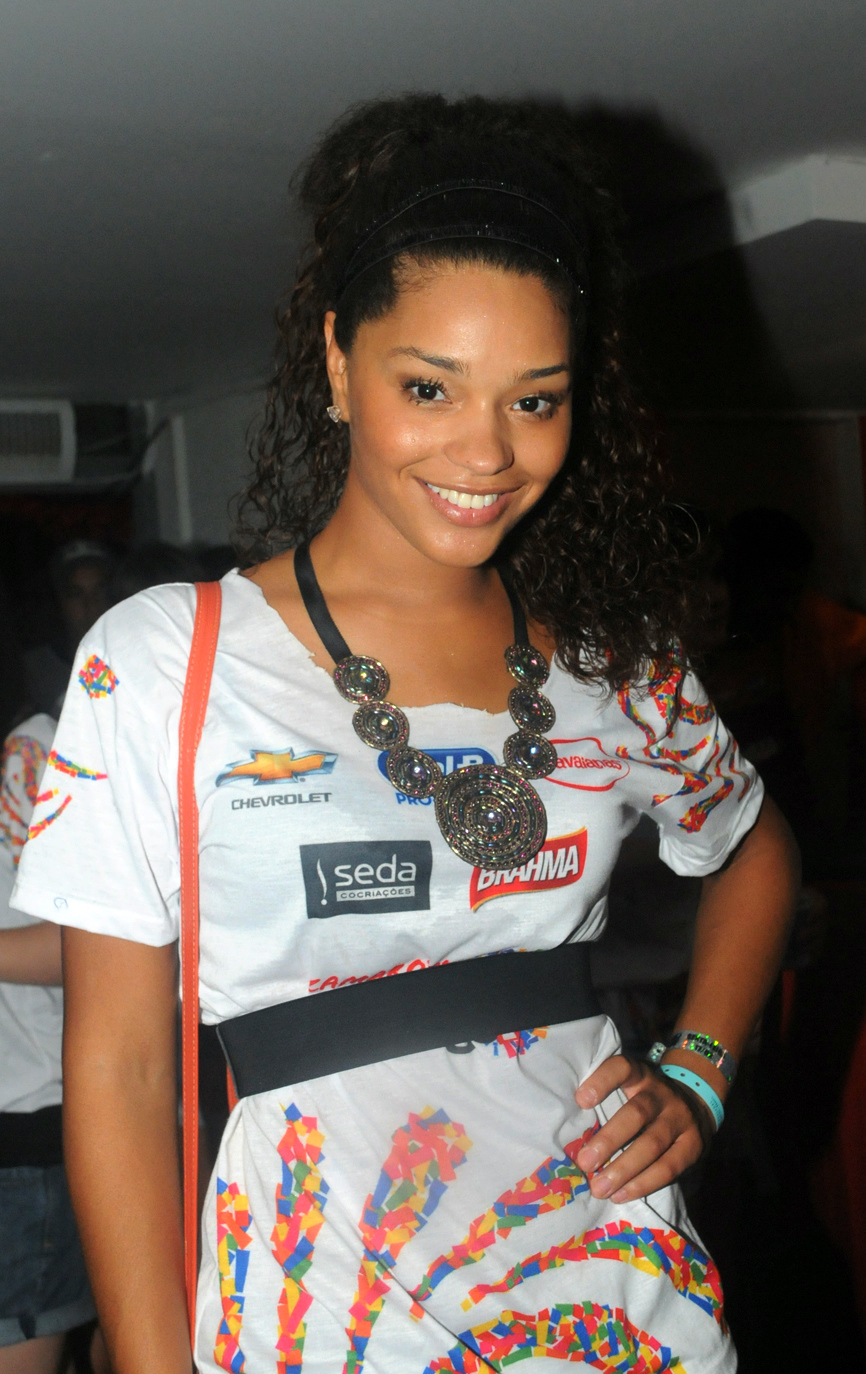
Juliana Alves as Dinha.

| Actor | Character |
|---|---|
| Taís Araújo | Maria da Penha Fragoso Barbosa (Penha) |
| Leandra Leal | Maria do Rosário Monteiro da Silva Paixão (Rosário) |
| Isabelle Drummond | Maria Aparecida dos Santos Souza Fragoso (Cida) |
| Cláudia Abreu | Jociléia Imbuzeiro Migon (Chayene) |
| Ricardo Tozzi | Fabianilson Brunini (Fabian)/Inácio Paixão |
| Marcos Palmeira | Sandro Barbosa |
| Humberto Carrão | Elano Fragoso |
| Titina Medeiros | Maria do Perpétuo Socorro Cordeiro de Jesus (Socorro/Lady Praga) |
| Malu Galli | Lygia Mariz Ortega |
| Alexandra Richter | Sônia Muniz Lyra Sarmento |
| Tato Gabus Mendes | Ernani Sarmento |
| Giselle Batista | Isadora Muniz Lyra Sarmento |
| Jonatas Faro | Conrado Tilman Amaro Werneck |
| Aracy Balabanian | Máslova Tilman |
| Bruno Mazzeo | Antonio Bastos (Tom) |
| Maria Helena Chira | Dália |
| Chandelly Braz | Brunessa de Almeida dos Anjos |
| Jayme Matarazzo | Rodinei Maximiliano de Lima (Rodi) |
| Tainá Müller | Liara Mariz |
| Simone Gutierrez | Ariela Sarmento Jordão |
| Rodrigo Pandolfo | Humberto Jordão |
| Luiz Henrique Nogueira | Laércio Migon |
| Marília Martins | Simone Brunini |
| Dhu Moraes | Valdelice Araújo (Valda) |
| Daniel Dantas | Sidney Monteiro |
| Juliana Alves | Diana Moreira (Dinha) |
| Day Mesquita | Stela |
| Lady Francisco | Madame Kastrup |
| Miguel Roncato | Samuel Mariz Motta |
| Marcos Pasquim | Gilson Motta Filho |
| Fábio Lago | Rivonaldo José Cordeiro de Jesus |
| Leopoldo Pacheco | Otto Amaro Werneck |
| Christiana Kalache | Ivone dos Anjos |
| Mônica Torres | Branca Plastino |
| Sérgio Malheiros | Niltinho |
| Olívia Araújo | Jurema |
| Gustavo Gasparani | Gentil Soares |
| Lidi Lisboa | Maria das Graças (Gracinha) |
| Pablo Bellini | Alejandro Ortega |
| Edney Giovenazzi | Seu Messias |
| Sérgio Menezes | Kleiton Lopes |
| Ilva Niño | Maria Epifânia Cordeiro de Jesus |
| Aramis Trindade | Valmir |
| Cláudio Tovar | Seu Malaquias |
| Maria Pompeu | Voleide Lopes |
| Analu Prestes | Tia Romana Paixão |
| Alexandre David | Zaqueu |
| Breno Nina | Wanderley |
| Sylvia Nazareth | Alana Fragoso |
| Millene Ramalho | Ticiane |
| Nado Grimberg | Ruço |
| Rafaela Amado | Marisette |
| Nicolas Paixão | Patrick Fragoso Barbosa |
| Bia Passos | Manuela Mariz Ortega |
| Izak Dahora | Heraldo |

== Original Music ==
- Vida de Empreguete (Life of Empreguete) - Played by Empreguetes
- Marias Brasileiras (Brazilian Marias) - Played by Empreguetes
- Forro das Curicas - Played by Empreguetes
- Nosso Brilho (Our Glow) - Played by Empreguetes
- Voa, Voa Brabuleta (Fly, Fly Brutterfly) - Played by Chayene
- Vida de Patroete (Life Of Patroete) - Played by Chayene
- Se Você Me Der (If You Give Me) - Played by Fabian

== Reception ==
=== Ratings ===
| Timeslot | # Eps. | Premiere | | Finale | | Rank | Season | Average viewership |
| Timeslot | # Eps. | Date | Viewers (in points) | Date | Viewers (in points) | Rank | Season | Average viewership |
|---|---|---|---|---|---|---|---|---|
| Monday—Saturday; 7:30 pm | 143 | 16 April 2012 | 35 | 28 September 2012 | 33 | #1 | 2012 | 30 |

| Preceded by Aquele Beijo; 17 October 2011–13 April 2012 | TV Globo 7 p.m. timeslot telenovela 16 April 2012–28 September 2012 | Succeeded by Guerra dos Sexos; 1 October 2012–26 April 2013 |
