= Caras & Bocas =

Brazilian telenovela by Walcyr Carrasco

- Also known as: Watercolors of Love
- Genre: Telenovela
- Created by: Walcyr Carrasco
- Starring: Flávia Alessandra; Malvino Salvador; Ingrid Guimarães; Isabelle Drummond; Henri Castelli; Fúlvio Stefanini; Deborah Evelyn; Fernanda Machado and big cast
- Opening theme: "Caras & Bocas" by Chicas
- Country of origin: Brazil
- Original language: Portuguese
- No. of episodes: 232

Production
- Production locations: South Africa & Brazil
- Camera setup: Multiple-camera setup
- Running time: 50–80 minutes
- Production company: Central Globo de Produção

Original release
- Network: Rede Globo
- Release: 13 April 2009 – 8 January 2010

Caras & Bocas (English: Watercolors of Love) is a Brazilian telenovela produced and broadcast by TV Globo, which premiered on 13 April 2009 and ended on 8 January 2010. It was the second-most watched telenovela in Brazil.

== Cast ==
Actor/actress	Character
Flávia Alessandra	Dafne Bastos Conti da Silva
Malvino Salvador	Gabriel Batista da Silva
Deborah Evelyn	Judith Silveira Lontra
Ingrid Guimarães	Simone Meirelles
Marcos Pasquim	Denis Batista de Azevedo
Elizabeth Savalla	Maria do Socorro Batista da Silva (Socorro)
Henri Castelli	Vicente Foster
Isabelle Drummond	Bianca Bastos Conti da Silva
Ary Fontoura	Jacques Michel Conti
Fúlvio Stefanini	Frederico Foster
Sidney Sampaio	Benjamin Abraham (Benny)
Ana Lúcia Torre	Ester Abraham
Marco Pigossi	Cássio Amaral
Maria Zilda Bethlem	Leandra Silveira Lontra (Léa)
Miguel Rômulo	Felipe Nunes Paiva
Fernanda Machado	Laís Molinari Vasconcellos
Sérgio Marone	Nicholas Silveira Lontra (Nick)
Sheron Menezzes	Milena Nunes Conti
Otaviano Costa	Adenor Cosme de Lima
Rachel Ripani	Tatiana Fischer
Bete Mendes	Maria da Piedade Batista Azevedo Conti (Piedade)
Danieli Haloten	Anita Batista da Silva
Cristina Mutarelli	Zoraide Molinari
Marcos Breda	Pelópidas Travassos
Thalma de Freitas	Magaly Franco
Carmem Verônica	Josefa (Jojô)
David Lucas	Bruno Guimarães de Azevedo (Espeto)
Fábio Lago	Fabiano Barros Ferreiro
Suzana Pires	Ivonete Barros Ferreira
Júlio Rocha	Edgar Pereira
Renata Castro Barbosa	Cléo Foster
Sophie Charlotte	Vanessa Barros Ferreira (Vanessinha)
Wagner Santisteban	Anselmo
Dhu Moraes	Dirce Nunes Paiva
Joelson Medeiros	Padre Guilherme
Roney Facchini	Ernani Molinari
Pedro Garcia Netto	Galeno Pellozini
Jaime Leibovitch	Rabino Mendel Abraham
Rafael Zulu	Carlos Vasconcellos (Caco)
Alexandre Slaviero	Tadeu Molinari
Ricardo Duque	André Di Francesco
Hilda Rebello	Nereide Di Francesco
Marcelo Barros	Jandir
Carina Porto	Ísis Molinari
Alexandre Moreno	Aluísio Leal
Sônia de Paula	Edineide
Ludoval Campos	Nélson
Guilherme Duarte	Samuel
Francisco Fortes	Tatá
Amanda Azevedo	Ada Franco Leal
Gabriel Kaufmann	Valdemir Barros Ferreira
Júlia Lund	Hannah Foster
Alice Assef	Beth
Maria Clara Gueiros	Liliana Guimarães de Azevedo (Lili)
Guilhermina Guinle	Amarilys Di Francesco
Neusa Maria Faro	Mercedes
Dener Pacheco	Renan
Júlia Ruiz	Clotilde Foster (Clô)
Rodrigo Andrade	Teodoro (Téo)
Marco Antônio Gimenez	Sargento Lucas Rios
Theodoro Cochrane	Isaac

== Soundtrack ==
=== National ===
Cover: The telenovela logo

1. "Caras e Bocas" - Chicas
2. "C'est si bon" - Rita Lee and Roberto de Carvalho
3. "Meu Sonho" - Os Paralamas do Sucesso
4. "Quando" - Myllena
5. "Um Dia De Domingo" - Ana Carolina and Celso Fonseca
6. "Mais Uma Vez" - Marisa Monte
7. "Vem Andar Comigo" - Jota Quest
8. "É só você" querer – Elba Ramalho
9. "Simplesmente Mulher" - Silvia Machete
10. "Saudade da Bahia" - Moinho
11. "Vem Na Minha" - Kelly Key
12. "Amor Perfeito" - Gé Cardoso e Lilach Davioff
13. "Nada Além" - Roberto Frejat
14. "No Ordinary Love" - João Pinheiro
15. "Antes De Você" - Titãs
16. "Vida" - Padre Fábio de Melo
17. "Te Amo" - Wanderléa
18. "De Volta Ao Planeta dos Macacos" - Jota Quest
19. "Além do Paraíso" - Jussara Silveira

=== International ===
Cover: Flávia Alessandra

1. "Lucky" - Jason Mraz feat. Colbie Caillat
2. "Already Gone" - Kelly Clarkson
3. "Don't Wanna Miss" - Lia Weller
4. "The Fear" - Lily Allen
5. "Stand by Me" - Seal
6. "No Other Love" - John Legend feat. Estelle
7. "Funky Bahia" - Sérgio Mendes part. will.i.am
8. "Fell In Love" - Alain Clark
9. "Invece no" - Laura Pausini
10. "If" - Daniel Boaventura
11. "Ahava" (É o Amor) – Gê and Lilaz
12. "I'll be there" - Av Project feat. Itauana Ciribelli and Dan Torres
13. "Your Heart Is As Black As Night" - Melody Gardot
14. "Lovin' You" - Rosanah Fiengo
15. "Bewitched" - Ronaldo Canto e Mello
16. "All about our Love" - João Pinheiro feat. Marjorie Philibert

=== Instrumental ===
1. "Tango moo"
2. "Chapliniana"
3. "Frederico"
4. "Na Galeria (suspense)"
5. "Caretas 1"
6. "Caretas 2"
7. "Afrika 1"
8. "Afrika 2"
9. "Afrika 3"
10. "No Boteco"
11. "Ongsong"
12. "Judaica moo"
13. "Judaica moo (suspense)"
14. "Mitzva Party"

Preceded by Três Irmãs; 15 September 2008–10 April 2009	Globo 7 p.m. timeslot telenovela 13 April 2009–8 January 2010	Succeeded by Tempos Modernos; 11 January 2010–16 July 2010
