= Danieli Haloten =

Brazilian lawyer and former actress

- Born: Danieli Haloten; February 21, 1980 (age 46); Curitiba, Parana, Brazil
- Occupations: Actress, journalist

Danieli Haloten (born in Curitiba on February 21, 1980) is a Brazilian lawyer and former actress, noted for being the first blind actress to play a major role in a Brazilian soap opera, Caras & Bocas, broadcast by the Globo Network.

Haloten is blind since the age of 17 due to a glaucoma.

Willing to land a role in a telenovela, Haloten contacted TV writer Walcyr Carrasco, who created a character specifically for her in Caras & Bocas. She would go to the production studios with her guide dog Higgans. In a 2025 interview, she revealed she struggled with the production team, whom she claimed treated her poorly, as well as a few actors, especially because of her dog, which was eventually kept in a room while she was shooting.

Following this experience, and due to her difficulty in landing more roles in television, she gave up her acting career and went to law school. In 2025, she was working at the Santa Catarina labour court and keeping a profile on Instagram where she talks about accessibility and people with disabilities.
