= Ingrid Guimarães =

Brazilian actress, comedian and TV presenter

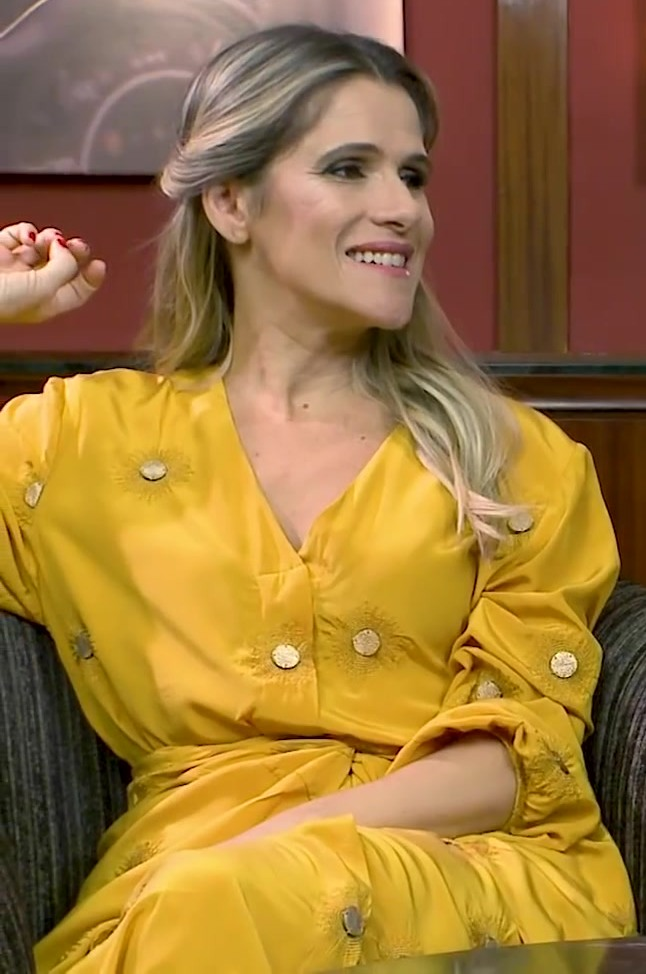
- Guimarães in 2019
- Born: Ingrid da Silva Guimarães; July 5, 1972 (age 54); Goiânia, Goiás, Brazil
- Occupations: Actress, comedian
- Partner: Renê Machado (2006–present)
- Children: 1
- Relatives: Reginaldo Faria (uncle); Marcelo Faria (cousin); Regis Faria (cousin)
- Website: www.ingridguimaraes.com

Ingrid da Silva Guimarães (born July 5, 1972) is a Brazilian actress, comedian and television presenter.

== Personal life ==
Since 2006, she has been married to artist Renê Machado and they have a daughter, Clara (born in 2010).

She is the niece of actor Reginaldo Faria and cousin of actor Marcelo Faria and director, producer and screenwriter Regis Faria (both sons of Reginaldo Faria). According to Ingrid, both her grandmother and Marcelo and Regis' grandmother were sisters.

== Filmography ==
=== Television ===
- 1993 - Mulheres de Areia .... Jurema
- 1996 - Chico Total .... Reporter
- 1997 - Por Amor .... Tereza
- 1999 - Você Decide, O Príncipe da Feira
- 1999 - Você Decide, Meu Passado Condena
- 1999 - Você Decide, O Dilema de Rosane
- 2001 - Sai de Baixo, Um Louro Chamado Desejo .... Zildete
- 2001 - Os Normais, Cair na Rotina é Normal .... Denise
- 2001 - Escolinha do Professor Raimundo .... Leandra Borges
- 2003 - Kubanacan .... Rosita
- 2003 - Zorra Total .... Leandra Borges
- 2003 - Sob Nova Direção .... Pit (2003–2007)
- 2007 - Mulheres Possíveis .... Presenter (2007-2009)
- 2008 - Casos e Acasos, O Encontro, O Assédio e O Convite .... Camila
- 2008 - Casos e Acasos, O Encontro, o Homem Ideal e a Estréia .... Nina
- 2008 - Fantástico .... Leandra Borges
- 2009 - Caras & Bocas .... Simone
- 2010 - Fantástico .... Herself
- 2010 - Os Caras de Pau .... Tati
- 2010 - Batendo Ponto (Pilot) .... Val (Valquíria)
- 2011 - Batendo Ponto .... Val (Valquíria)
- 2011 - Macho Man .... Helô Fragoso Fraga
- 2011 - Aventuras do Didi .... Herself
- 2012 - A Grande Família, O Pai do Serginho .... Lili Pessanha
- 2012 - 220 Volts, Fama
- 2013 - Sangue Bom .... Tina Leão
- 2013 - Sai de Baixo, Quem Casa Quer Caco .... Henriqueta do Rego Amado
- 2017 - Novo Mundo .... Elvira Matamouros
- 2019 - Bom Sucesso .... Silvana Nolasco
- 2022 - Nos Tempos do Imperador .... Elvira Matamouros

=== Film ===
- 1997 - Amar
- 1998 - Alô?! .... Valentina
- 2002 - Avassaladoras .... Paula
- 2004 - Um Show de Verão .... Jaqueline
- 2005 - Depois Daquele Baile .... Beth
- 2008 - Polaroides Urbanas .... Verley
- 2010 - De Pernas pro Ar .... Alice Segretto
- 2011 - Gnomeo & Juliet .... Nanette (Brazilian voice dubbing)
- 2012 - Totalmente Inocentes .... Raquel
- 2012 - De Pernas pro Ar 2 .... Alice Segretto
- 2013 - Minha Mãe é uma Peça .... Soraya
- 2016 - Entre Idas e Vindas .... Amanda
- 2017 - Fala Sério, Mãe! .... Ângela Cristina Siqueira Paz
- 2026 - Minha Melhor Amiga

=== Theater ===
- 1987 - Jardim das Borboletas
- 1992 - Confissões de Adolescente
- 1995 - The Diary of Anne Frank
- 1997 - Duas Mãos
- 1998 - Os Sete Gatinhos
- 2000 - Duas Mãos
- 2000 - A Espera
- 2000 - Laboratório de Humor
- 2001 - Cócegas
- 2002 - Cosquinha
- 2012 - Reasons to Be Pretty .... Steph
