= A Lei do Amor =

- Also known as: Wounded Past
- Genre: Telenovela
- Created by: Maria Adelaide Amaral; Vincent Villari
- Directed by: Natália Grimberg
- Creative director: Denise Saraceni
- Starring: Cláudia Abreu; Reynaldo Gianecchini; Vera Holtz; José Mayer; Grazi Massafera; Tarcísio Meira; Thiago Lacerda; Cláudia Raia; Camila Morgado; Ricardo Tozzi; Heloísa Périssé; Isabella Santoni; Humberto Carrão; Alice Wegmann
- Opening theme: "O Trenzinho Caipira" by Ney Matogrosso; "Llegaste tú" by Jesse y Joy (International version)
- Composer: Ricardo Leão
- Country of origin: Brazil
- Original language: Portuguese
- No. of episodes: 155 (145 on the International version)

Production
- Production locations: Paraty; Rio de Janeiro; São Paulo
- Editors: Fabricio Ferreira; Willian Alves Correia; Rodrigo Clemente; Claudio Ferri; Renato Fernandez
- Camera setup: Multi-camera
- Running time: 29-57 minutes

Original release
- Network: TV Globo
- Release: 3 October 2016 – 31 March 2017

A Lei do Amor (English title: Wounded Past; literal meaning: The Law of Love) is a Brazilian telenovela produced and broadcast by TV Globo. It premiered on 3 October 2016, replacing Velho Chico, and ended on 31 March 2017, being replaced by A Força do Querer.

Created by Maria Adelaide Amaral and Vincent Villari, the telenovela is directed by Natalia Grimberg and Denise Saraceni.

It features performances by Cláudia Abreu, Reynaldo Gianecchini, Vera Holtz, Grazi Massafera, Tarcísio Meira, José Mayer, Ricardo Tozzi, Thiago Lacerda, Claudia Raia, Isabella Santoni, Humberto Carrão, Alice Wegmann and Heloísa Périssé in the main roles.

The plot features the story of Heloísa and Pedro, who, after years of separation, meet once again and realize the feelings they had for each other, and the efforts of Tião and Magnólia to separate them. It also features politics, power, seduction, comedy, envy, and family drama in the fictitious town of São Dimas, where the characters' lives intertwine to create cohesion and conflicts.

== Plot ==
The story begins in 1995 in a fictitious city of São Dimas, a metropolitan region of São Paulo, which is a typical picture of society and politics. A medium-sized town that has its main source of income from a weaving factory headed by businessman Fausto (Tarcísio Meira) and his wife Magnólia (Vera Holtz), known to many simply as Mág, whom the city's population has real veneration.

What most people don't know is that Mág, behind the veneer of false tenderness which all tend to view, hides her true nature; she is arrogant, authoritarian, always thirsty for power, and without any scruples. By using various tricks to get what she wants, no matter who gets hurt, and trying to use these as justification that everything she does is to keep his family together. Fausto married Mág shortly after her first wife's death, who was Pedro's (Chay Suede/Reynaldo Gianecchini) mother. They have two other children, Hércules and Vitória.

Pedro meets Heloísa, a young woman who lives a quiet life with her parents; her mother, Cândida, who has leukemia, and the unemployed and alcoholic father, Jorge. In an act of desperation, her father tries to rob the textile company owned by Fausto but ends up being indicted and arrested; in prison, there is a rebellion, and the latter dies. Later, his mother also passed on from her disease for lack of proper treatment.

With Helô and Pedro's relationship, which started prior to the unfortunate events, Mág and Fausto cultivate a plan to separate the two. They hire Gabriela, a new secretary of Mág, to seduce and lure Pedro to bed, and they also contract Helô to a modeling agency run by Mág's trusted friend and confidante, Gigi. In cahoots with Mág, Gigi sends Helô away from São Dimas for modeling, leaving Pedro vulnerable to Suzana. At the same time, they cut communication between the two, and Pedro felt that Helô had moved on without him. On the night of Helô's surprise return, Pedro got drunk and fell asleep. Mág demands that Suzana seduce Pedro. Helô finds the naked Suzana with Pedro and believes that Pedro betrayed her (even though nothing really happened between the two and Pedro never knew about it till years later). During the anger episode, Helô leaves São Dimas indefinitely to be a professional model, where she meets Tião, a man whom she marries, and Pedro lives in France due to the pain he felt by Helô's absence.

Years later, Helô has seemingly moved on with her powerful Tião (José Mayer) who has apparently become distant over the years, with their two children: Letícia, who suffers the same ailment the grandmother had, and Edu, who has a difficult relationship with his father. Pedro returns to São Dimas, and their romance with Helô is rekindled, once more putting each other to the test as the forces that are set to separate them are reinforced.

== Cast ==
- Cláudia Abreu as Heloísa "Helô" Martins Bezerra
  - Isabelle Drummond as Young Helô
- Reynaldo Gianecchini as Pedro Guedes Leitão
  - Chay Suede as Young Pedro
- Vera Holtz as Magnólia Costa Leitão
  - Ana Carolina Godoy as Young Magnólia
- José Mayer as Sebastião "Tião" Bezerra
  - Thiago Martins as Young Sebastião
- Isabella Santoni as Letícia Martins Bezerra
- Humberto Carrão as Tiago Leitão
- Sophia Barclay as Sara Garcia de Oliveira
- Alice Wegmann as Isabela Dias
- Tarcísio Meira as Fausto Leitão
- Thiago Lacerda as Ciro Noronha
  - Maurício Destri as Young Ciro
- Camila Morgado as Vitória Costa Leitão Noronha
  - Sophia Abrahão as Young Vitória
- Grazi Massafera as Luciane Leitão
- Danilo Grangheia as Hércules Costa Leitão
  - João Vítor Silva as Young Hércules
- Ricardo Tozzi as Augusto Tavares
  - Hugo Bonemer as Young Augusto
- Claudia Raia as Salete
- Daniel Rocha as Gustavo
- Emanuelle Araújo as Yara Garcia
  - Bruna Moleiro as Young Yara
- Heloísa Périssé as Mileide Rocha
- Arianne Botelho as Aline Garcia de Oliveira
- Bianca Müller as Ana Luiza Costa Leitão
- Matheus Fagundes as Eduardo "Edu" Martins Bezerra
- Bruna Hamú as Camila Leitão
- Tuca Andrada as Misael de Oliveira
  - Acauã Sol as Young Misael
- Otávio Augusto as César Venturini
- Maurício Machado as Arlindo Nacib
- Gil Coelho as Wesley
- Regiane Alves as Beth Tavares
- Ana Rosa as Zuleika "Zuza" Pessoa
- Maria Flor as Flávia
- Danilo Ferreira as Zelito
- Titina Medeiros as Ruty Raquel Rocha
- Armando Babaioff as Bruno Pessoa
- Gabriel Chadan as Robinson
- Érico Brás as Jader Azevedo
- Pierre Baitelli as Antônio Ferrari
- João Campos as Élio Bataglia
  - Theo Medon as Young Élio
- Tato Gabus Mendes as Olavo Maciel
- Marcella Rica as Jéssica
- Bia Montez as Leila de Oliveira

=== Guest stars ===
- Regina Duarte as Suzana Rivera
  - Gabriela Duarte as Young Suzana
- Denise Fraga as Cândida Martins
- Daniel Ribeiro as Jorge Martins
- Bianca Salgueiro as Carmen da Silva Leitão

== Soundtrack ==
=== Volume 1 ===
- Cover: Cláudia Abreu, Reynaldo Gianecchini, Chay Suede and Isabelle Drummond

A Lei do Amor - Vol. 1

Soundtrack album by Various artists
- Released: 14 October 2016
- Label: Som Livre

No.	Title	Artist(s)	Length
1.	"Bachianas Brasileiras N2 (O Trenzinho do Caipira)"	Ney Matogrosso
2.	"Blue"	Blubell
3.	"No Meu País (ft. Xande de Pilares)"	Zélia Duncan
4.	"Step by Step"	New Kids on the Block
5.	"Meu Recado"	Alice Caymmi
6.	"Lovesong"	Edson Cordeiro
7.	"Chuva no Mar (ft. Marisa Monte)"	Carminho
8.	"Estado de Poesia"	Chico César
9.	"What's Up?"	4 Non Blondes
10.	"Levanta"	Renata Jambeiro
11.	"Folgado"	Marília Mendonça
12.	"Partículas do Amor"	Márcia Castro
13.	"Por Enquanto"	Cássia Eller
14.	"The Rip Tide"	Beirut

=== Volume 2 ===
- Cover: Alice Wegmann and Humberto Carrão

A Lei do Amor - Vol. 2

Soundtrack album by Various artists
- Released: 17 February 2017
- Label: Som Livre

No.	Title	Artist(s)	Length
1.	"Don't Wanna Fight"	Alabama Shakes
2.	"Water Under the Bridge"	Adele
3.	"Maior (by Milton Nascimento)"	Dani Black
4.	"A Distância Roberto Carlos"	Roberto Carlos
5.	"Aos Meus Pés"	João Bosco
6.	"Pessoa"	Marina Lima
7.	"Duele el corazón" (with Wisin)"	Enrique Iglesias
8.	"É Bom Para o Moral"	Rita Cadillac
9.	"Fogo"	Gaby Amarantos
10.	"Estrela Blue"	Simone Mazzer
11.	"Miracle"	Above & Beyond
12.	"Não Demora"	Adriana Calcanhotto
13.	"Fogueira"	Angela Ro Ro
14.	"Perdóname"	Pablo Alborán
15.	"Grito de Alerta"	Gonzaguinha and Maria Rita
16.	"Era Pra Ser"	Maria Bethânia
17.	"O Que Aconteceu Com o Nosso Amor?"	Andrea Marquee
18.	"Quem Leva a Vida Sou Eu"	Lenine
19.	"Cowboy Fora da Lei"	Raul Seixas
20.	"Happy, Happy Birthday, Baby (Bonus track)"	The Tune Weavers
21.	"O Calhambeque (Road Hog)" (Bonus track)"	Roberto Carlos

== Ratings ==
Timeslot	# Eps.	Premiere		Finale		Rank	Season	Average viewership
Timeslot	# Eps.	Date	Viewers (in points)	Date	Viewers (in points)	Rank	Season	Average viewership
Monday—Saturday; 9:10 pm	155	3 October 2016	30	31 March 2017	37	TBD	2016—17	TBD

The first episode of A Lei do Amor registered a viewership rating of 30 points in Greater São Paulo, the lowest viewership for the 8/9 pm telenovela premiere.

== See also ==
- Carlos Gomes Square - filming location
