= Aruanas =

Brazilian television series

- Genre: Drama
- Created by: Estela Renner; Marcos Nisti
- Starring: Débora Falabella; Taís Araújo; Leandra Leal; Camila Pitanga; Luiz Carlos Vasconcelos; Thainá Duarte; Vitor Thiré
- Opening theme: "Se Identifica", A's Trincas
- Country of origin: Brazil
- Original language: Portuguese
- No. of seasons: 2
- No. of episodes: 20

Production
- Producers: Pryka Almeida; Marcos Nisti; Luana Lobo; Estela Renner
- Cinematography: Breno Cunha
- Production companies: Estúdios Globo; Maria Farinha Filmes

Original release
- Network: Globoplay
- Release: July 2, 2019 – present

Aruanas is a Brazilian thriller drama web television series created by Estela Renner and Marcos Nisti and produced by Estúdios Globo in association with Maria Farinha Filmes for Globoplay.

The series is centered on Luiza (Leandra Leal), Natalie (Debora Falabella) and Verônica (Taís Araújo) who are the founders of an NGO for environmental protection. Together with intern Clara (Thainá Duarte), they start investigating an anonymous tip that points to a series of evidence linking a powerful mining company to illegal miners in the Amazon rainforest.

The first season, consisting of 10 episodes, became available for streaming on July 2, 2019. With the technical advisor of Greenpeace and the support of other ENGOs, the series is the first original production of Globoplay that was released internationally through a Vimeo-powered platform. The second season premiered on November 25, 2021.

== Cast and characters ==
- Débora Falabella as Natalie Lima Melo
- Taís Araújo as Verônica Muniz
- Leandra Leal as Luiza Laes
- Camila Pitanga as Olga Ribeiro
- Luiz Carlos Vasconcelos as Miguel
- Thainá Duarte as Clara
- Vitor Thiré as André

== Production ==
=== Conception ===
The co-producer Ana Lúcia Villela stated that the inspiration for the series came from the concern with climate change and the Amazon rainforest. Written by Estela Renner and Marcos Nisti, with the collaboration of Pedro Barros, the production intended to focus mainly on the role of activists. Under the artistic direction of Carlos Manga Jr., and the direction of Estela, the series relied on Greenpeace consultancy and with the support of other 28 human and environmental rights organizations with global presence.

=== Casting ===
In July 2018, Débora Falabella, Taís Araújo and Leandra Leal were announced as being cast for the lead characters. In November 2018, Ravel Andrade, Marcos de Andrade, Daniel Ribeiro, Gustavo Falcão and Bruno Padil joined the cast of the series. In December, Camila Pitanga had joined the cast as the villain character Olga.

== Reception ==
The President of the United Nations General Assembly, María Fernanda Espinosa, praised the production. "We must all be an Aruana, sentinels of our forests. The series shows the strength and determination of women and the need for everyone to get involved with sustainability, to live a life with dignity based on generosity with the others and with other species of our planet".

== Marketing ==
Aruanas had a presentation panel at the Comic Con Experience in São Paulo on December 7, 2018, with the presence of the protagonists Débora Falabella, Leandra Leal, Camila Pitanga and Taís Araújo alongside the director Carlos Manga Jr and the writers Marcos Nisti and Estela Renner.

Several screenings of the series took place prior to its release. The first screening took place at the Electric Cinema, Notting Hill in London, on June 18, 2019, with the presence of actress Debora Falabella. The exhibition was followed by a panel that counted with the participation of representatives from Greenpeace, Amnesty International and the United Nations Environment Programme. The second screening took place at Angelika Film Center in New York City, on June 24, 2019, with the presence of actress Taís Araújo.
