= Confia em Mim =

2014 film directed by Michel Tikhomiroff

- Theatrical release poster
- Directed by: Michel Tikhomiroff
- Screenplay by: Fabio Danesi
- Starring: Mateus Solano; Fernanda Machado; Bruno Giordano; Fernanda D`Umbra
- Production companies: Globo Filmes; Mixer
- Distributed by: Downtown Filmes
- Release date: March 28, 2014 (Brazil)
- Running time: 85 minutes
- Country: Brazil
- Language: Portuguese

Confia em Mim is a 2014 Brazilian thriller film directed by Michel Tikhomiroff. It is the first feature film directed by Tikhomiroff.

== Plot ==
Mari, a promising chef, works hard to save her economies to open her own restaurant. Recently separated she now engages with Caio, an investor who will help her to realize her dream. However things won't be easy as she thinks.

== Cast ==
- Mateus Solano as Caio
- Fernanda Machado as Mari
- Bruno Giordano as Vicente
- Fernanda D'Umbra as Teresa
