= Cazuza: O Tempo Não Pára =

2004 film by Sandra Werneck and Walter Carvalho

- Theatrical release poster
- Directed by: Sandra Werneck; Walter Carvalho
- Screenplay by: Fernando Bonassi; Victor Navas
- Based on: Cazuza: Só as Mães São Felizes by Lucinha Araújo
- Produced by: Daniel Filho
- Starring: Marieta Severo; Reginaldo Faria; Emílio de Mello; Daniel de Oliveira; Andréa Beltrão; Leandra Leal; André Gonçalves; Cadu Fávero; Arlindo Lopes; Dudu Azevedo; André Pfeffer
- Cinematography: Walter Carvalho
- Edited by: Sérgio Mekler
- Music by: Cazuza; Guto Graça Mello
- Production companies: Lereby Produções; Globo Filmes; Cineluz Produções
- Distributed by: Columbia TriStar
- Release date: 11 June 2004 (Brazil)
- Running time: 98 minutes
- Country: Brazil
- Language: Portuguese
- Box office: R$21.2 million

Cazuza: O Tempo Não Pára (Cazuza: Time Doesn't Stop) is a 2004 Brazilian biographical musical drama film directed by Sandra Werneck and Walter Carvalho, about the life of singer Cazuza. It stars Daniel de Oliveira as Cazuza. The film is based on the 1997 biography Cazuza: Só as Mães São Felizes by Cazuza's mother, Lucinha Araújo. The film won a Best Actor Award from the São Paulo Association of Art Critics Awards. It was one of the most successful films of the year in Brazil.

== Synopsis ==
Focusing on Cazuza's personal life, the film chronicles his early career, his subsequent success, his drug use and his promiscuous lifestyle. It starts out in the early 1980s in Rio de Janeiro, showing his usual day-to-day life until he joins the band which would become Barão Vermelho. It then shows the band's rise to fame and its frequent "mutinies" which led him to pursue a solo career. Later, it depicts his struggle against the AIDS virus and his final days.

== Cast ==
- Daniel de Oliveira as Cazuza
- Marieta Severo as Lucinha Araújo
- Débora Falabella as Dani
- Reginaldo Faria as João Araújo
- Emílio de Mello as Ezequiel Neves
- Cadu Fávero as Frejat
- Arlindo Lopes as Dé
- Dudu Azevedo as Guto
- André Pfeffer as Maurício
- Leandra Leal as Bebel Gilberto
- Andréa Beltrão as Malu
- André Gonçalves as Maneco
- Eduardo Pires as Serginho
- Pierre Santos as Tonico
- Vitor Hugo as Bené
- Maria Mariana as Talita
- Augusto Garcia as Carlos
- Maria Flor as girl from Bauru
- Fernanda Boechat as girl on bridge
- André Moraes as guitar player
