= Fernanda Machado =

Brazilian actress

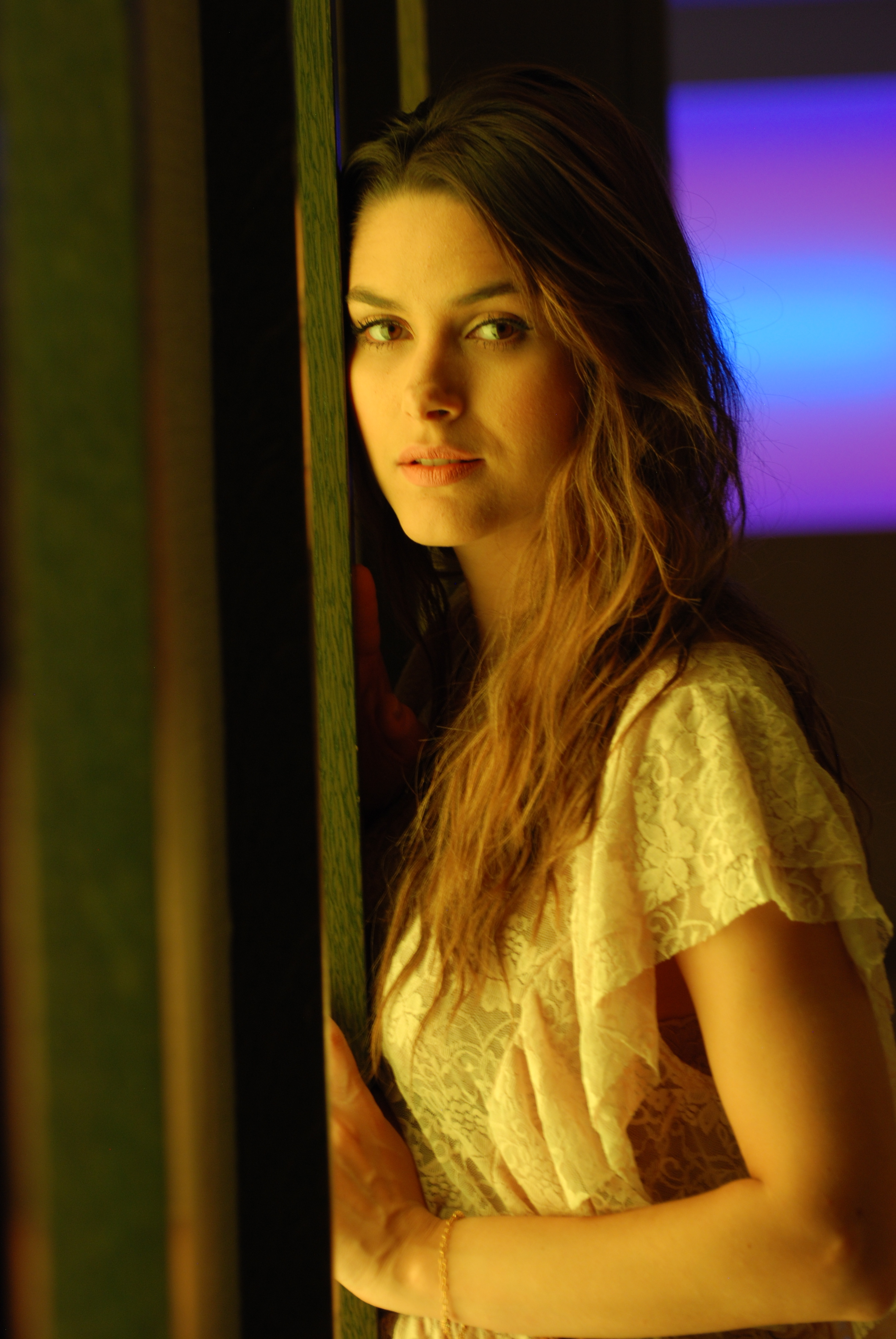
- Machado in 2011
- Born: Fernanda Arrias Machado; 10 October 1980 (age 44); Maringá, Paraná, Brazil
- Occupation: Actress
- Years active: 1998–present
- Spouse: Robert Riskin (m. 2014)
- Children: 2

Fernanda Arrias Machado (born 10 October 1980) is a Brazilian actress. She is best known for her role as Maria in the film Tropa de Elite.

== Career ==
Her first television work was in 2004, when she played Sonya in Rede Globo's telenovela Começar de Novo, by Antônio Calmon and Elizabeth Jhin.

She played Dalila in 2005 Rede Globo's telenovela Alma Gêmea and Joana in 2007's telenovela Paraíso Tropical. where she won the 2007 best supporting actress of TV Globo. Fernanda Machado played the role of Laís in Rede Globo's 2009 telenovela Caras & Bocas, by Walcyr Carrasco.

She had previously worked with him in Alma Gêmea. Fernanda Machado starred in the same year as Maria in Tropa de Elite which won the Berlin Film Festival in 2008.

She was part of the cast of 2011 Rede Globo's telenovela Insensato Coração, playing the role of Luciana. Her character was killed in a plane crash on January 25, 2011's episode. In 2013 returns in the novels Amor à Vida, the plot she will live the villain Leila. After closing the filming of the film A Menina Índigo, in 2016, Machado decided to give a career break to dedicate to motherhood.

== Personal life ==
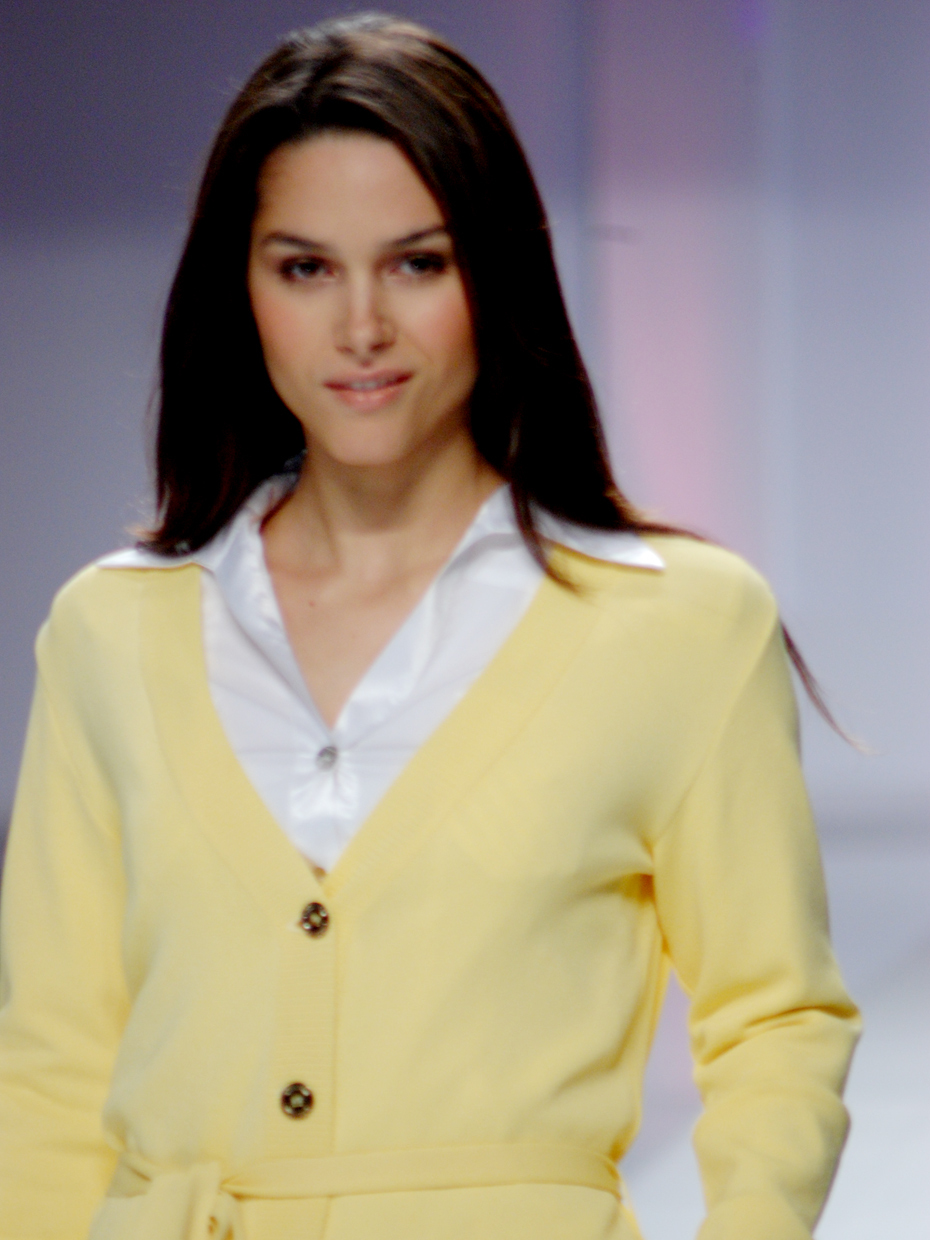
Machado (2008)

On 2 February 2014, Fernanda married American entrepreneur Robert Riskin in São Luís Gongaza Chapel, Maringá. On 22 June 2015, she gave birth to Lucca, the couple's first child. He was born in Santa Barbara, California.

== Filmography ==
=== Television ===
Year	Title	Role	Notes
2004	Começar de Novo	Sonya Karamazov	
2005	Alma Gêmea	Dalila Santini da Silva	
2007	Paraíso Tropical	Joana Veloso Schneider	
2008	Queridos Amigos	Lorena Vianna	
2008	Dicas de um Sedutor	Júlia	Episode: "Falta Homem"
2008	Casos e Acasos	Adriana	Episode: "O Encontro, o Homem Ideal e a Estréia Confusa"
2008	Casos e Acasos	Fabíola	Episode: "O Ultimato, o Vândalo e a Pensão"
2009	Superbonita	Guest Presenter	Episode: "September 13, 2009"
2009	Caras & Bocas	Laís Molinari	
2011	Insensato Coração	Luciana Alencar	Episodes: "January 17–25, 2011"
2011	Macho Man	Drª Rosany	Episode: "Nelson Sofre um Acidente que Muda sua Vida"
2013	Amor à Vida	Leila Melo Rodriguez	

=== Film ===
Year	Title	Role	Notes
2007	Inesquecível	Wife	
2007	Tropa de Elite	Maria	Film won Berlin Film Festival in 2008
2008	Inverno	Paula	Short film
2009	Flordelis - Basta uma Palavra para Mudar		
2011	Mentiras Sinceras	Beth	
2011	Amanhã Nunca Mais	Solange	
2013	Man Camp	Lúcia	
2014	Confia em Mim	Mari	
2016	A Menina Índigo	Sofia's mother	

== Theater ==
Year	Title	Role	Ref
1998	Hara Kiri		
1999	Adágio Número 6		
2000	Lagrimas Puras Em Olhos Pornograficos	Alice	
2001	Senhora		
2002	O Homem Elefante	Ana	
2003	A Longa Viagem Do Comandante Fulano De Tal	Evelyn	
2004	A Metamorforse	Grace	
2006	O Beijo no Asfalto	Selminha	
2010	Mente Mentira	Beth	
