= Luiz Carlos Vasconcelos =

Brazilian actor (born 1954)

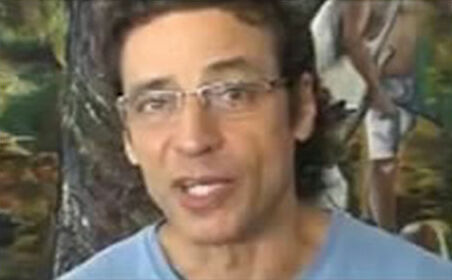
- Vasconcelos in 2009
- Born: 25 June 1954 (age 72); Umbuzeiro, Paraíba, Brazil
- Occupation: Actor
- Years active: 1976–present

Luiz Carlos Vasconcelos (born 25 June 1954) is a Brazilian actor.

== Selected filmography ==
=== Film ===
List of film appearances, with year, title, and role shown
Year	Title	Role	Notes
1996	Perfumed Ball	Lampião	
1998	Midnight	João	
2000	Me You Them	Ciro	
2001	Behind the Sun	Salustiano	
2003	Carandiru	Drauzio Varella	
2006	Árido Movie	Jurandir	
2013	Time and the Wind	Maneco	
2019	Marighella	Almir	

=== Television ===
List of television appearances, with year, title, and role shown
Year	Title	Role	Notes
2002	Pastores da Noite	Pé de Vento	4 episodes
2004	Senhora do Destino	Young Sebastião	3 episodes
2005	Carandiru, Outras Histórias	Drauzio Varella	7 episodes
2007	A Pedra do Reino	Arésio	5 episodes
2008	Queridos Amigos	Ivan	25 episodes
2015	Além do Tempo	Bento	3 episodes
2016	Justiça	Euclydes Menezes	20 episodes
2019	A Dona do Pedaço	Miroel Matheus	5 episodes
2019	Aruanas	Miguel Kiriakos	10 episodes
2020	Amor de Mãe	Januário Silva	16 episodes
2023	New Bandits	Deocleciano Maleiro	
2025	Guerreiros do Sol	Bosco	
2026	Alucinação – Belchior	Belchior	
