= Leandra Leal =

Brazilian actress (born 1982)

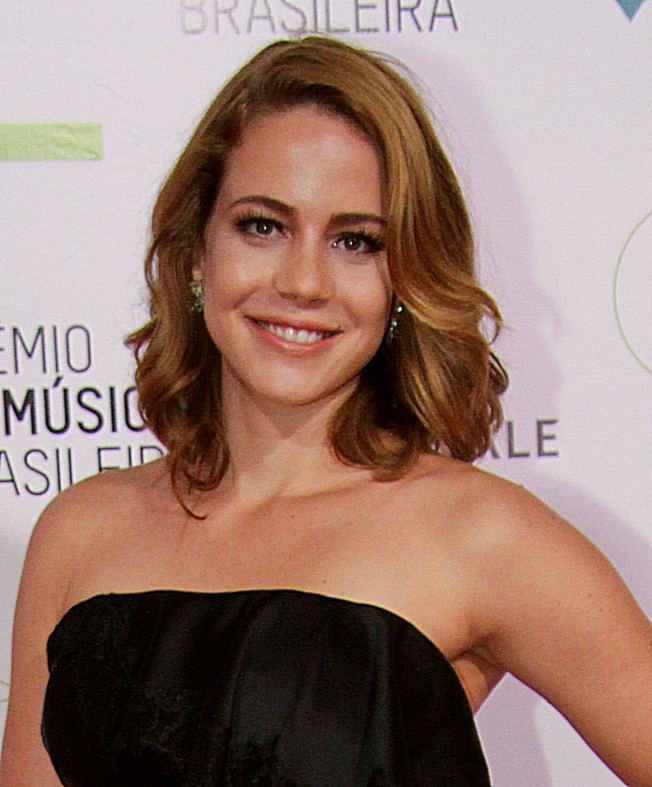
- Leal in 2015
- Born: Leandra Rodrigues Leal Braz e Silva; 8 September 1982 (age 43); Rio de Janeiro, Brazil
- Occupations: Actress; singer; film director; producer; playwright
- Years active: 1990–present
- Spouses: José Paes de Lira (m. 2003; div. 2010) Alê Youssef (m. 2010; div. 2018) Guilherme Burgos (m. 2023)
- Children: 2
- Parent: Ângela Leal (mother)
- Relatives: Américo Leal (grandfather)

Leandra Rodrigues Leal Braz e Silva (born 8 September 1982) is a Brazilian actress, singer, film director, producer, and playwright.

== Biography ==
She is the granddaughter of the cultural producer Américo Leal and daughter of actress Ângela Leal. She started in drama at the age of seven, and eight on television, when she participated in the last chapter of the soap opera Pantanal, in which her mother also worked. An only child, one may assume she was influenced by her mother in her career choice, because since she was a little girl she has been living among artists and was fascinated by the art of interpretation.

In 2000 she co-starred in the miniseries A Muralha and then the soap opera O Cravo e a Rosa, emerging in both rather prominently. In 2002, she participated in the Pastores da Noite miniseries, and in 2002, she was present in a season of children's series Sítio do Picapau Amarelo. She also came to participate in some episodes of A Grande Família, as Viviane, one of Tuco's girlfriends.

In 2004, she acted in the soap opera Senhora do Destino, gaining the sympathy of the audience by clashing with the villain Nazaré, played by Renata Sorrah. Later that year, she also acted in the film Cazuza - O Tempo Não Pára, as Bebel, singer's best friend.

In 2008, she co-starred in the remake of Ciranda de Pedra as Elzinha. At the end of the year, she debuted as a director in the Mercadorias e Futuro goods and theatrical spectacle, with José Paes de Lira.

She is the flagship holder of the largest block of Carnival in Rio de Janeiro, the Cordão do Bola Preta.

In 2011, she was part of the cast of the film Estamos Juntos, participated in the last chapter of the soap opera Insensato Coração, and also participated of a framework called the Fantástico, A História do Amor, in which she played 64 different characters on the side the actor Daniel de Oliveira.

In 2012, she was in the episode "A Sexóloga de Floripa" in series As Brasileiras. And the soap opera is Cheias de Charme, playing Maria do Rosário. In 2013 was cast in the remake of Saramandaia, which give life to veterinary Zélia, one of the central characters of trama.

== Works ==
=== Television ===
Year	Títle	Role	Note
1990	Pantanal	Maria Marruá Leôncio	Cameo
1990	A História de Ana Raio e Zé Trovão		Cameo
1994	Confissões de Adolescente	Mariana	
1995	Explode Coração	Yanka	
1996	Você Decide		ep: "Um Mundo Cão"
1997	A Indomada	Lúcia Helena	1ª Phase
1998	Você Decide		ep: "Seria Trágico, Se Não Fosse Cômico"
1998	Pecado Capital	Clarelis Batista	
2000	A Muralha	Beatriz Ataíde Olinto	
2000	Brava Gente	Margarida	Cameo
2000	O Cravo e a Rosa	Bianca Batista	
2002	Sítio do Picapau Amarelo	Wallet Disguised By Cuca	ep: "Perigo no Reino das Águas Claras"
2002	Pastores da Noite	Otália	
2003	Sítio do Picapau Amarelo	Guinevere	ep: "A Lenda do Rei Arthur"
2003	A Grande Família	Viviane	12 episode (2003-2005)
2004	Um Só Coração	Ucha	
2004	Senhora do Destino	Maria Cláudia Tedesco	
2006	Páginas da Vida	Sabrina Marcondes	
2008	Ciranda de Pedra	Elza Carmelo	
2009	Decamerão - A Comédia do Sexo	Isabel	
2010	Passione	Agostina Mattoli	
2011	Insensato Coração	Adriana	Cameo
2011	A História do Amor	64 different characters	Board of Fantástico
2012	As Brasileiras	Rosa Maria	Ep: "A Sexóloga de Floripa"
2012	Cheias de Charme	Maria do Rosário Monteiro da Silva	
2013	Saramandaia	Zélia Vilar	
2014	Império	Cristina dos Anjos Bastos de Medeiros	
2016	Justiça	Kellen Aparecida	
2019	Aruanas	Luiza	
2026	Coração Acelerado	Zilá Garcia Sampaio Amaral	

=== Films ===
Year	Title	Role	Notes
1997	The Oyster and the Wind	Marcela	
1999	Traveller	Sinhá	
2000	O Melhor		
2000	O Maior		Short film
2001	Dias de Nietzsche em Turim		
2003	O Homem Que Copiava	Sílvia	
2003	Chatô, O Rei do Brasil	Lola	
2004	Cazuza - O Tempo Não Pára	Bebel Gilberto	
2006	Zuzu Angel	Sônia	
2007	Nome Próprio	Camila	
2008	Bonitinha, Mas Ordinária	Ritinha	
2009	Se Nada Mais Der Certo	Georgina	
2009	Insolação	Liuba	
2009	Antes da Noite		
2011	Estamos Juntos	Carmem	
2012	Boca	Silvia	
2013	Éden	Karine	
2013	Harmonica's Howl	Luana	
2013	Rio Belongs to Us	Marina	
2013	A Wolf at the Door	Rosa	
2013	The Dognapper	Zoé	
2014	Divinas Divas	Herself	Just as director
2017	Bingo: The King of the Mornings	Lúcia	
2017	O Rastro	Leila	
2024	Carnival is Over	Regina	

== Singles ==
Title	Artist	Artist(s) extra(s)
Vida de Empreguete	Empreguetes	Isabelle Drummond and Taís Araújo
Maria Brasileira	Empreguetes	Isabelle Drummond and Taís Araújo
Forró das Curicas	Empreguetes	Isabelle Drummond and Taís Araújo
Nosso Brilho	Empreguetes	Isabelle Drummond and Taís Araújo
