= Sophia Barclay =

Brazilian performer (born 2000)

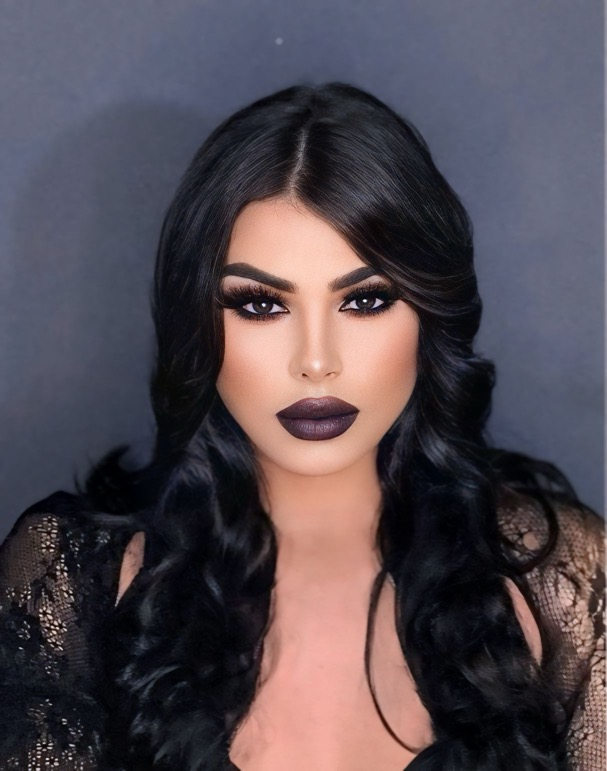
- Born: Sophia Barclay Gomes Claudino; 28 April 2000 (age 26); Guarulhos, São Paulo, Brazil
- Occupation: Actress

Sophia Barclay Gomes Claudino (born April 28, 2000) is a Brazilian transgender actress, digital influencer, and singer.

== Early and personal life ==
Sophia Barclay Gomes Claudino was born in Guarulhos, São Paulo on April 28, 2000, the eldest child of Ana Paula Gomes and Sérgio Claudino.

She is married to musician Gabriel Miranda and currently resides in the West Zone of Rio de Janeiro.

== Career ==
In 2016, she had a special participation as a highlight of the samba school Acadêmicos de Santa Cruz in the Rio de Janeiro carnival. In 2021, she portrayed 'Coral' in the film Doce Encanto, directed by the Brazilian filmmaker Cássio Pereira dos Santos.

In 2025, she announced her pre-candidacy for federal deputy for the new party (NOVO).

== Filmography ==
=== Films ===
Year	Title	Role
2021	Doce Encanto	Coral

== Controversies ==
In 2020, she suffered verbal abuse and discrimination from members of the Universal Church of the Kingdom of God. At the time, she was accompanying a friend with a disability who was having difficulties using the restroom. When she tried to intervene, due to her makeup and profession as a Drag queen, she was targeted for retaliation by those present, including security personnel. The incident garnered nationwide attention, leading to an investigation by the social communication and institutional relations department of the Universal Church, ultimately resulting in a formal apology.

In 2022, she accused actor Thomaz Costa of engaging in transphobia during their romantic involvement, stating that he proposed a confidentiality agreement. Following the exposure of the case, she faced intense criticism and chose to share a farewell letter with her fans. Barclay accused Flávio Bolsonaro of having been involved in sexual activities with a transgender friend during a party, resulting in Flávio Bolsonaro filing a legal suit against her.
