= Taís Araújo =

Brazilian actress, TV host and model (born 1978)

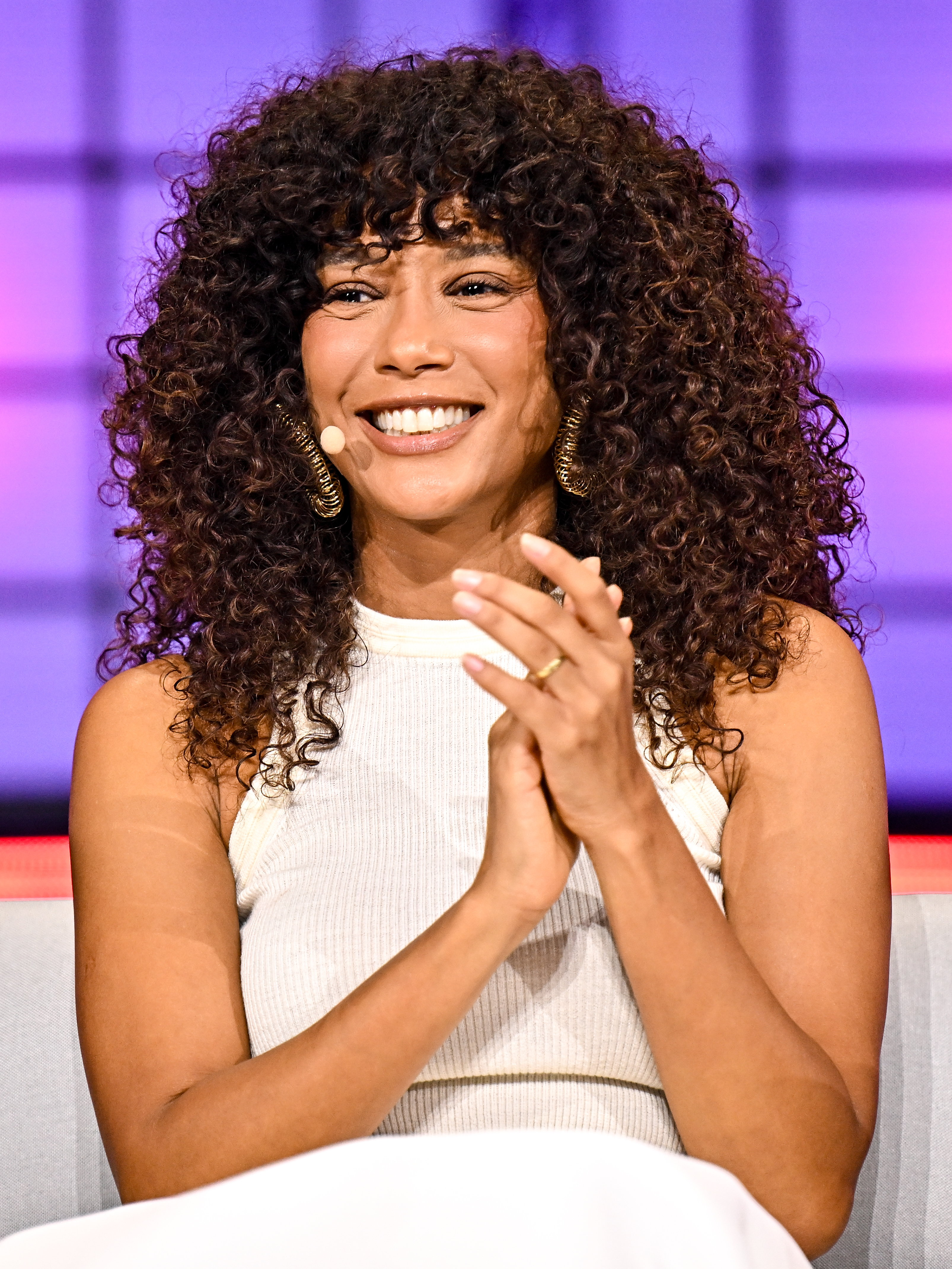
- Taís in 2025
- Born: Taís Bianca Gama de Araújo; November 25, 1978 (age 47); Rio de Janeiro, Brazil
- Education: Estácio de Sá University
- Occupations: Actress; model; television host
- Years active: 1995–present
- Spouse: Lázaro Ramos (m. 2007)
- Children: 2

Taís Bianca Gama de Araújo Ramos (Portuguese pronunciation: [taˈiʒ biˈɐ̃kɐ ˈɡɐ̃mɐ dʒi aɾaˈuʒu]; born November 25, 1978) is a Brazilian actress, TV host and model. Described by the media and general public as one of the great Brazilian actresses for her versatility in playing comedic and dramatic characters, in addition to being a very famous celebrity in Brazil.

Her first prominent role on television was in 1996 as protagonist of the Brazilian telenovela Xica da Silva by Walcyr Carrasco, in the Rede Manchete. In 2004, she portrayed Preta in Da Cor do Pecado created by João Emanuel Carneiro and she played Ellen, comic antagonist in the telenovela Cobras & Lagartos in 2006. In 2009, she player her first role as protagonist in primetime of Globo, one of the Helenas created by Manoel Carlos in the telenovela Viver a Vida—making her the first black woman to star in a prime time telenovela.

In 2012 she played Maria da Penha in the telenovela Cheias de Charme, the fourth lead role in her career. Her sixth leading role was playing the journalist Verônica Monteiro in technology oriented television series Geração Brasil, as part of the main trio of the plot, alongside Cláudia Abreu and Murilo Benício.

In 2015 she took the lead of the musical comedy television series Mister Brau opposite her husband Lázaro Ramos. Taís is still touring the country with the play O Topo da Montanha, which debuted in São Paulo in 2015 and earned her a nomination for the Shell Award for Best Actress. As a television host takes part in the program Saia Justa aired at the GNT network.

In 2016 an opinion poll (Pesquisa Qualibest) pointed out Taís Araújo as the woman most admired by young people between the ages of 13 and 20, the fifth most influential artist in television and internet in the country, according to the newspaper Meio & Message in partnership with Instituto Datafolha in 2016, and the fourth most influential in 2017.

In 2017 she was elected one of the 100 most influential personalities of the world under 40 years of age by MIPAD, and for this reason she participated in a debate at Columbia University in New York. In 2015, in the matter of the English newspaper The Guardian on the series Mister Brau, the pair Taís Araújo and Lázaro Ramos was quoted like featured in the Brazilian television. Also was chosen one of the most warlike and stylish women by the American magazine Vogue. She and her husband Lázaro Ramos were shortlisted out as the most powerful of the national showbizz, in the cover of Veja magazine published in March 2017. On July 3, 2017, she was appointed as the Defender of Rights of Black Women by UN Women Brazil, a United Nations entity for gender equality and women's empowerment.

== Life and career ==
Taís Araújo was born in Rio de Janeiro on November 25, 1978, as a premature birth of seven months. She is of African, Austrian and Portuguese descent. She is daughter to Ademir de Araújo, an economist and Mercedes de Araújo, an educationist. Araújo is the second daughter of her parents and her sister, Cláudia Araújo—a doctor—seven years older than her. She is also cousin to actor and singer Marcello Melo Jr. During her childhood, she lived with her family in Méier, neighbourhood in the North Zone of Rio de Janeiro. Until the age of 8, Araújo mainly studied in private institutions. From her younger years through her large extent of her adolescence and youth she lived in Barra da Tijuca. She studied journalism in Estácio S.A. On June 18, 2011, she gave birth to her first son João Vicente de Araújo Ramos, a fruit of her marriage to Lázaro Ramos. On August 7, 2014, Araújo announced that she was with child-a girl.

Her first character in telenovelas was in Tocaia Grande in 1995, directed by Walter Avancini. A few months later, Walter Avancini was set to direct the telenovela Xica da Silva, of 1996, and chose Araújo to be the lead, in Rede Manchete. The telenovela was exported to a good number of countries. In 2000, she was voted add one of the 50 most beautiful faces in the world by the Spanish version of People magazine. In 1997, she moved to Rede Globo to star in Anjo Mau, playing Vivian. That same year, he met the director Denise Saraceni, with whom he would return to work other times in his career. In 2004, she received Kikito's Best supporting actress at the Festival de Gramado for her work on The Daughters of the Wind.

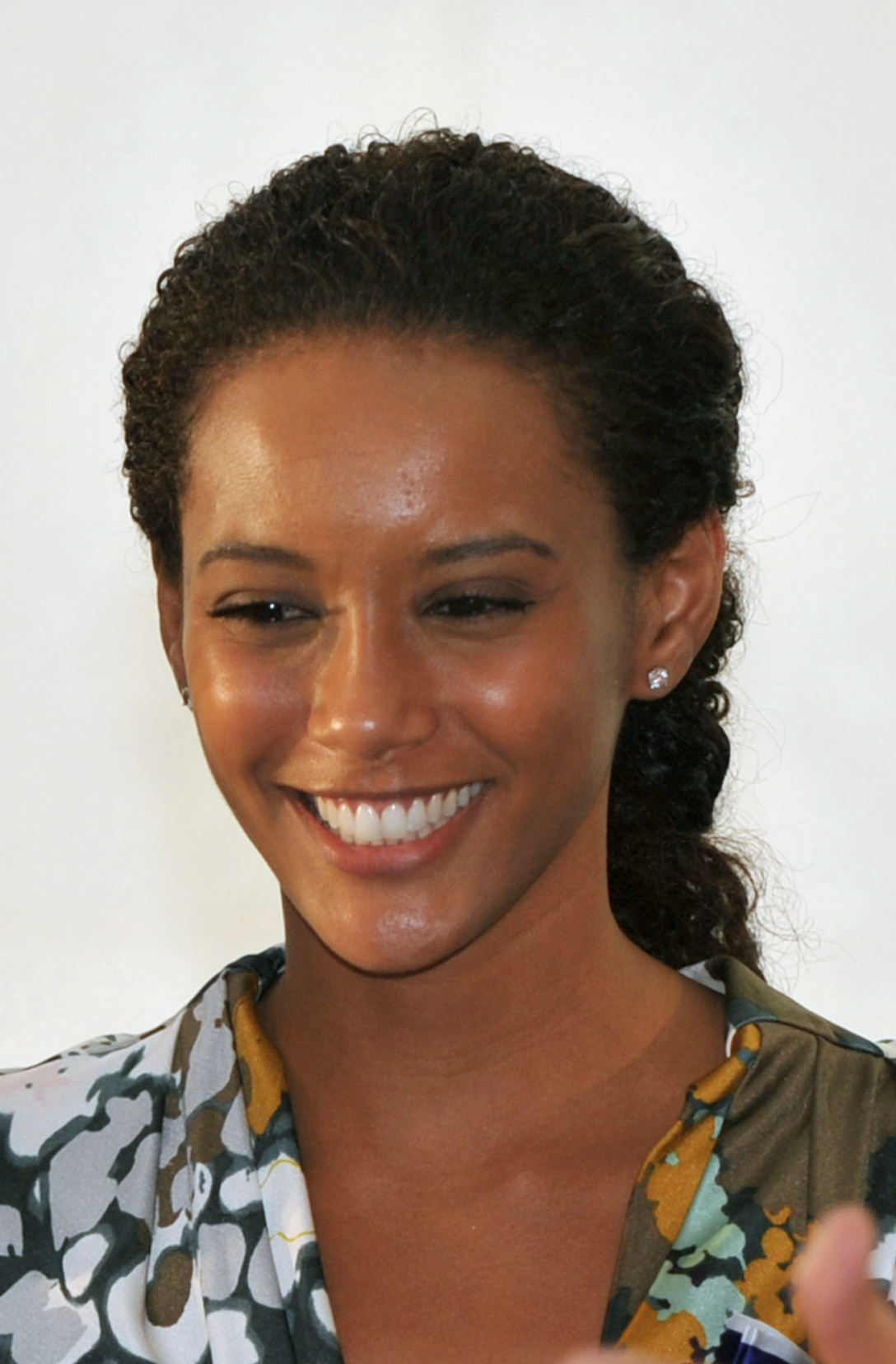
In 2004, in the role of Preta, was also the first black protagonist of a telenovela produced by Globo TV in Da Cor do Pecado created by João Emanuel Carneiro

In 2006 she played the comic villain Ellen in Cobras & Lagartos, also created by Carneiro; she had an onscreen romance with then boyfriend Lázaro Ramos. In 2006, she was the first black presenter of the program Superbonita of the channel GNT, where it would remain by three years, until 2009. In 2008, she returned to work with João Emanuel Carneiro, in A Favorita; portraying Alicia, daughter of a corrupt deputy played by Milton Gonçalves, who for the second time, consecutively, was his father in a telenovela, the first one in Cobras & Lagartos. After the end of A Favorita's recordings in January 2009, the actress wrote her first article in the Folha de S. Paulo newspaper, in which she reported the inauguration of President Barack Obama. Separated from her husband Lázaro Ramos, she moved to Paris, with an intention to study French. She got an offer from Manoel Carlos, making her the first black actress in Brazilian television history to be the protagonist of a primetime novel—the 8 pm telenovelas that garner a large viewership—a role of Helena that has been portrayed by a number of actresses before. The telenovela Viver a Vida was not as successful, and the role of Helena was marked as the biggest failure in Araújo's career, with the total rejection of the character, being criticized by the media and the viewers. At the time, and she came to think that it would be the end of her blossoming career, going through depression for a period of two years.

In 2012 Araújo played the maid who turns singer, Maria da Penha, in the 7 pm comedy drama telenovela, Cheias de Charme, Created by Filipe Miguez and Izabel de Oliveira. In addition to film and television, she has also performed in the theater. In 2013, she lived the secretary Sheila in the series O Dentista Mascarado, a character of dubious character, owner of many facets, known in the square by various names.

In 2014 portrayed journalist Veronica in the Geração Brasil, working again with the creators Filipe Miguez and Izabel de Oliveira. Taís was cast to play Michele in the series Mister Brau, with her spouse Lázaro Ramos. In 2015, alongside Lázaro Ramos, she made her debut in the play the Top of the Mountain that earned her nomination for the contest Shell Prize of Better Actress, and took more than 100 thousand people to the theater. In 2016 starred in her seventh film, The Cup Steal, in the role of Dolores inspired by Adele Fatima.

== Personal life ==
Taís dated the singer and television host Netinho de Paula while he was a member of the group Negritude Júnior in the late 1990s until the early 2000s. After the relationship with Netinho ended, Taís dated and became engaged to the jiu-jitsu fighter Marcio Feitosa, with whom they broke up in 2004. Shortly thereafter, she began dating Lázaro Ramos, whom she married in January 2007. In March 2008, the actors decided to separate amicably. Araújo got into a relationship with Allan Espinosa, son of football coach Valdir Espinosa. Months later, rumors began circulating that she and Ramos had reconciled. They announced their reconciliation in April 2009. On June 18, 2011, her first son, João Vicente, was born. In mid 2014, Araújo announced that she was expectant. Her daughter Maria Antônia was born on January 23, 2015, exactly at 8:45 am in the maternity ward of Barra da Tijuca, in the West Zone of Rio; Claudia Araújo—Araújo's sister and obstetrician gynecologist—was one of the doctors who did the surgery.

On the night of October 31, 2015 the actress's Facebook page was the subject of racist comments, and she stated in a posting: "I will not be intimidated, I will not lower my head either." The hashtag #SomosTodosTaísAraújo became a trending topic on the morning of November 1. The same case occurred with the journalist Maria Júlia Coutinho and also the actresses Sheron Menezes and Cris Vianna, victims of cyberbullying. The Office of the Prosecutor for Crimes of Informatics launched an investigation to determine the crime. In 2016, for her fight against racism, she received the honor in the Trip Transformadores Prize, of Trip Magazine.

In 2017 she was invited to participate in a Tedx lecture in São Paulo, telling an audience of about nine thousand people about her experiences in social activism in the struggle for equal rights in society. Also in 2017, she was elected one of the 100 most influential Afro-descendant personalities in the world under the age of 40, and received the award in New York City. Also in 2017, received a tribute in the Award Claudia promoted by the Claudia Magazine, of Editora Abril, in São Paulo, in the category hors concours, honor granted to the people that act by the equality of rights in the society.

She and her husband Lázaro Ramos have two children.

== Filmography ==
=== Television ===
Year	Title	Role	Notes
1994	Pátria Minha	Appeared at the opening	
1995	Tocaia Grande	Bernarda Saruê	
1996	Xica da Silva	Francisca da Silva de Oliveira "Xica da Silva" / Joana da Silva	Main role
1997	Anjo Mau	Vívian dos Santos Ribeiro	
1998	Meu Bem Querer	Edivânia	
1999	Yo soy Betty, la fea	Herself	Episodes: "13–15 November"
1999	Você Decide	Kika	Episode: "O Dragão e a Borboleta"
2000	Mulher	Dalila	Episode: "Jogos Proibidos"
2000	Uga-Uga	Emilinha	Episode: "13 July"
2001	Porto dos Milagres	Selminha Aluada	
2002	O Quinto dos Infernos	Dandara	
2002	Brava Gente	Beatriz	Episode: "Um Capricho"
2002	A Grande Família	Maria da Graça	Episode: "Vai Pra Casa, Beiçola"
2004	Da Cor do Pecado	Preta de Souza Lambertini	Main role
2004	Correndo Atrás	Solange Arruda / Laís	
2005	América	Nossa Senhora Aparecida	Episode: "20 October"
2006	Cobras & Lagartos	Ellen dos Santos	Main role
2006–2009; 2020–2021	Superbonita	Presenter	Seasons 7–10 Seasons 20–21
2007	Casos e Acasos	Gabriela Machado	Episode: "Piloto"
2008–2009	A Favorita	Alícia Rosa	130 episodes
2009	Viver a Vida	Helena Toledo	Main role
2011	Passione	Herself	Episode: "14 January"
2012	Cheias de Charme	Maria da Penha Fragoso "Penha"	Main role
2013	O Dentista Mascarado	Sheila Vidal "Shaly"/ Paladina Justiceira	
2014	Now Generation	Verônica Monteiro	Main role
2015–2018	Mister Brau	Michele Maria Pederneiras "Michele Brau"	Main role
2016	Tá no Ar: a TV na TV	Helena Toledo	Episode: "5 April"
2016	Globo de Ouro Palco VIVA Samba	Presenter	
2017	Rock Story	Michele Maria Pederneiras "Michele Brau"	Episode: "1 March"
2017	Detetives do Prédio Azul	Miss Holly / Bruxilda Nilda	Episode: "O Anel da Berenice"
2017	Saia Justa	Presenter	
2018–2019	Popstar	Presenter	
2019–2021	Aruanas	Verônica Muniz	Main role
2019–2021	Amor de Mãe	Vitória Amorim	Main role
2020	Amor e Sorte	Tabata Saboia	Episode: "Linha de Raciocínio"
2020	Falas Negras	Marielle Franco	
2021–2024	The Masked Singer Brasil	Juror	
2022–2023	Cara e Coragem	Clarice Gusmão / Anita Lopes	
2023	Projeto Led:Luz na Educação	Juror	
2023	Vem Que Tem	Host	
2024	Falas Femininas	Host	Episode: "Louca"
2025	Vale Tudo	Raquel Gomes Accioli	
2025	Tributo	Herself	Episode: "Walcyr Carrasco"

=== Film ===
Year	Film	Role	Ref.
1998	Caminho dos Sonhos	Ana Cavalcante	
1998	Drama Urbano		
2003	Garrincha – Estrela Solitária	Elza Soares	
2005	As Filhas do Vento	Cida	
2006	The Greatest Love of All	Luciana	
2006	Nzinga	Nzinga	
2008	A Guerra dos Rocha	Carol	
2016	O Roubo da Taça	Dolores	
2019	Spies in Disguise	Marcy Keppel (voice)	
2020	Executive Order	Capitú	
2021	Pixinguinha – Um Homem Carinhoso	Albertina Nunes Pereira / Beti Vianna	
2023	Ritmo de Natal	Inês	
2023	Minha Irmã e Eu	Herself	
2024	Kung Fu Panda 4	The Chameleon (voice)	
2024	O Auto da Compadecida 2	Nossa Senhora da Conceição Aparecida	
2024	Sinfonia de Natal	Fernanda Soares	
2025	Chuck Billy and the Marvelous Guava Tree	Dona Goiabeira	
2025	Doutor Monstro	Cláudia Ferreira	

=== Music video ===
Year	Song	Artist	Ref.
2017	"Esse Brilho é Meu"	Iza	

== Theatre ==
Theatre
Year	Title	Ref
1997	Orfeu da Conceição	
2003	Personalíssima Isaurinha Garcia	
2005	Liberdade para as Borboletas	
2007	Solidores	
2007	O Método Gronholm	
2010	Gimba, o Presidente dos Valentes	
2011	Amores, Perdas e Meus Vestidos	
2013	Sangue na Caixa de Areia	
2015–2020	O Topo da Montanha	

== Awards and nominations ==
Awards and nominations
Year	Awards	Category	Nominated work	Result	Ref.
1997	Troféu Imprensa	Revelação do Ano	Xica da Silva	Won	
1999	Festival de Cinema Brasileiro de Miami	Best Actress	Caminho dos Sonhos	Won	
2004	Festival de Cinema Brasileiro de Miami	Best Actress	Garrincha – Estrela Solitária	Won	
2004	Festival de Gramado	Best Supporting Actress	As Filhas do Vento	Won	
2004	Prêmio Contigo! de TV	Best Actress	Da Cor do Pecado	Nominated	
2004	Prêmio Contigo! de TV	Best in Romantic Couple (with Reynaldo Gianecchini)	Da Cor do Pecado	Won	
2004	Troféu Raça Negra	Best Actress	Da Cor do Pecado	Won	
2006	Melhores do Ano	Best Actress	Cobras & Lagartos	Won	
2007	Troféu Imprensa	Best Actress	Cobras & Lagartos	Nominated	
2007	Meus Prêmios Nick	Favorite Actress	Cobras & Lagartos	Won	
2007	Prêmio Contigo! de TV	Best Actress	Cobras & Lagartos	Nominated	
2007	Prêmio Contigo! de TV	Best Romantic Couple(with Lázaro Ramos)	Cobras & Lagartos	Nominated	
2012	Prêmio Quem de Televisão	Best Actress	Cheias de Charme	Nominated	
2012	Prêmio Extra de Televisão	Best Actress	Cheias de Charme	Nominated	
2014	Prêmio Quem de Televisão	Best Actress	Geração Brasil	Nominated	
2015	Prêmio Quem de Televisão	Best Actress	Mister Brau	Pending	
2015	Melhores do Ano	Best Actress in a Series or Miniseries	Mister Brau	Nominated	
2015	Prêmio F5	Actress of the Year	Mister Brau	Pending	
2016	Prêmio Shell	Best Actress	O Topo da Montanha	Nominated	
2016	Prêmio Cenym de Teatro	Best Actress	O Topo da Montanha	Nominated	
2016	Prêmio Qualidade Brasil de Teatro	Best Actress Drama	O Topo da Montanha	Nominated	
2016	Melhores do Ano	Best Actress in a Series or Miniseries	Mister Brau	Nominated	
2016	Prêmio Trip Transformadores	Homenagem – Trip Transformadores do Ano	Herself	Won	
2016	Geração Glamour – Glamour	Cool woman of the year	Herself	Won	
2016	Man of the Year – GQ Brasil	Woman of the year	Herself	Won	
2017	Troféu Internet	Best Actress	Mister Brau	Nominated	
2017	Prêmio Claudia – Claudia	Homenagem – Ativismo social	Herself	Won	

== See also ==
- List of Afro-Latinos
