= Cláudia Abreu =

Brazilian actress (born 1970)

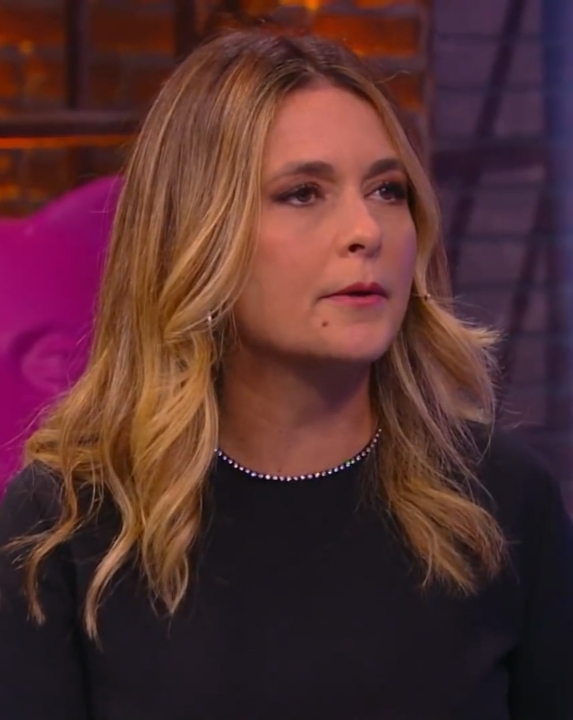
- Abreu in 2021
- Born: Cláudia Abreu; 12 October 1970 (age 56); Rio de Janeiro, Brazil
- Education: Pontifical Catholic University of Rio de Janeiro
- Occupations: Actress, screenwriter, producer
- Years active: 1986–present
- Spouses: Guilherme Fontes (m. 1989; div. 1994) José Henrique Fonseca (m. 1997; div. 2022)
- Children: 4

Cláudia Abreu (Brazilian Portuguese: [ˈklawdʒ(ɐ) aˈbɾɛw]; born 12 October 1970) is a Brazilian actress, screenwriter and producer.

== Filmography ==
=== Film ===
Year	Title	Role	Notes
1996	Tieta of Agreste	Leonora Cantarelli	Director: Carlos Diegues
1997	Four Days in September	Renée / Vera Sílvia Magalhães	Director: Bruno Barreto
1997	Guerra de Canudos		Director: Sérgio Rezende
1997	Ed Mort	Cibele	Director: Alain Fresnot
2001	A Samba for Sherlock	Baroness Maria Luiza	Director: Miguel Faria Jr.
2003	The Man of the Year	Cledir	Director: José Henrique Fonseca
2003	The Middle of The World	Rose	Director: Vicente Amorim
2008	Os Desafinados		Director: Walter Lima Jr.
2014	Rio, I Love You	Felicia	Director: Various

=== Television ===
Year	Title	Role	Notes
1986	Hipertensão	Luzia	
1987	O Outro	Maria José de Mattos (Zezinha)	
1989	Fera Radical	Ana Paula Flores	
1989	Que Rei Sou Eu?	Princesa Juliette de Avillan	
1990	Barriga de Aluguel	Clara Ribeiro	
1992	Anos Rebeldes	Heloísa	
1994	Pátria Minha	Alice Proença Pellegrini Laport	
1998	Labirinto	Liliane	
1999	Força de um Desejo	Olívia / Ana Tambellini	
2001	Brava Gente	Mulher do Zé	Episode: "O Diabo Ri Por Último"
2002	O Quinto dos Infernos	Amélie of Leuchtenberg	
2003	Celebridade	Maria Laura Prudente da Costa	
2005	Belíssima	Vitória Rocha Assumpção	
2008	Três Irmãs	Dora Jequitibá Áquila	
2012	Cheias de Charme	Jociléia Imbuzeiro Migon (Chayene)	
2014	Now Generation	Pamela Parker-Marra	
2016	A Lei do Amor	Heloísa "Helô" Martins Bezerra	
2020	Unsoul	Ignes Skavronski Burko	
2025	Dona de Mim	Filipa Campelo Boaz	
