= List of Brazilians of Black African descent =

Black Brazilian Brasileiros Pretos
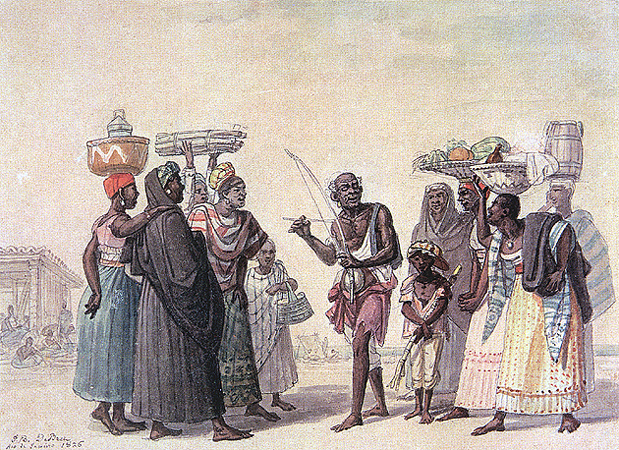

Total population
- 20,656,458; 10.2% of the Brazilian population (2022 Census)

Regions with significant populations
- Brazil

Languages
- Portuguese

Religion
- Predominantly Christianity (majority Roman Catholic)

Related ethnic groups
- Brazilian People, Black People, African American, Afro Chilean, Afro Argentine, Afro-Cuban, african-Ecuadorian, Afro-Latin American, Afro-Mexican, Afro-Peruvian, Afro-Trinidadian, Black Canadian, African Australian, Afro-Jamaicans, Afro-Costa Rican, Afro-Uruguayan.

Black Brazilian is a term used to categorise by race or color Brazilians who are black. 10.2% of the population of Brazil consider themselves black (preto). Though, the following lists include some visually mixed-race Brazilians, a group considered part of the black population by the Brazilian Black Movement.

== List of black Brazilians by occupation ==
=== Business ===
- Francisco Paulo de Almeida, Baron of Guaraciaba

=== Football ===
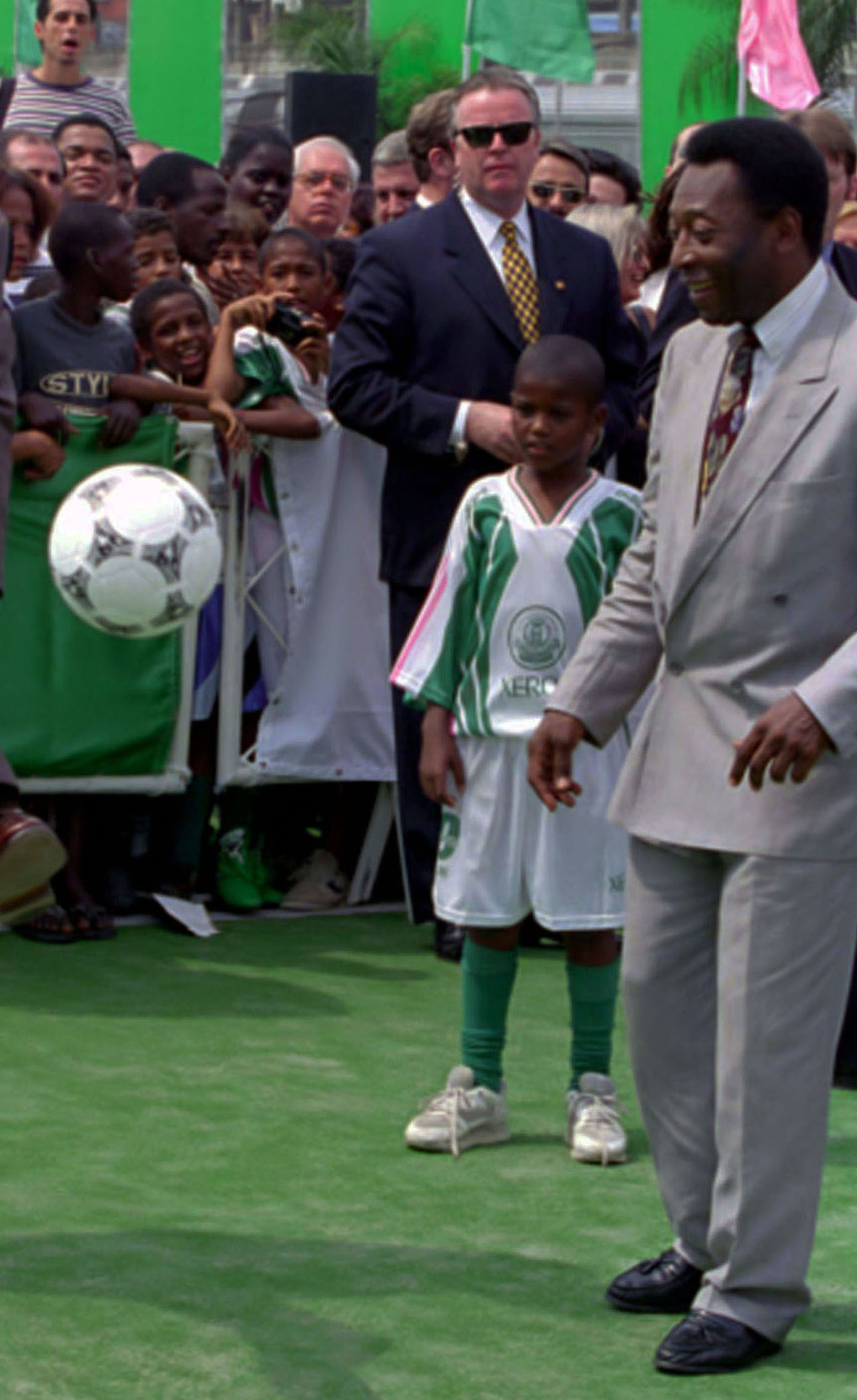
Pelé

- Adaílton Da Silva Santos
- Adaílton
- Adalberto Machado
- Adílio
- Adriana
- Adriano
- Ailton Ferreira Silva
- Alan - naturalized Chinese citizen
- Aldair
- Alessandro Santos - naturalised Japanese footballer
- Alex
- Alex Oliveira
- Alexsandro
- Allano
- Amanda Gutierres
- Anderson Salles
- André
- André Bahia
- André Luís Leite
- Andrey Santos
- Andrezinho
- Ângelo Gabriel
- Antônio Géder
- Ari - naturalised Russian footballer
- Arouca
- Arthur Friedenreich
- Arthur
- Ary Borges
- Baiano
- Betao
- Bill
- Boison Wynney, through his mother
- Brenner Alves Sabino
- Breno Lopes
- Bruno Cantanhede
- Bruno Cortez
- Bruno
- Bruno Peres
- Bruno Viana
- Cacau - naturalised German footballer
- Camila
- Carla
- Carlāo
- Carlinhos
- Carlos Santos
- Carlos Alberto
- Carlos Alberto Torres
- Vinícius
- César Sampaio
- Chay
- Cicinho
- Claudinho
- Cacapa
- Cléber
- Dalbert Henrique
- Daniel Carvalho
- Daniel dos Anjos
- Danilo Pereira
- Danilo
- Danilo dos santos
- Danilo Barbosa
- Danilo
- Dankler
- Dante
- David
- Denilson
- Denilson Costa
- Didi
- Diego Costa
- Diego Tardelli
- Diogo Rincón
- Diogo Rincón
- Dirceu Lopes
- Djalma Santos
- Djalminha
- Dodo
- Dodo
- Donizete Pantera
- Douglas
- Douglas Teixeira
- Douglas Luiz
- Douglas
- Douglas Tanque
- Dudinha
- Dyego Sousa
- Edcarlos
- Éder Militão
- Edílson
- Eduardo - naturalised Croatian footballer
- Elber
- Emerson
- Emerson Royal
- Emerson Sheik - naturalised Qatari footballer
- Endrick
- Enio
- Eric Ramires
- Erick
- Erison
- Estêvão Willian
- Evander
- Evanilson
- Everaldo
- Ewerthon
- Fabinho
- Fábio Simplício
- Felipe Melo
- Felipe Santana
- Fernando
- Fernando
- Flávio Conceição
- Franklin
- Gabriel
- Gabriel Magalhães
- Gabriel Silva
- Gabriel Veron
- Garrincha
- Geovanni
- Gerson
- Geyse
- Gil
- Giva
- Gladstone
- Gleison Bremer
- Gökçek Vederson - naturalized Turkish citizen
- Gregore
- Guilherme Arana
- Guilherme guedes
- Guilherme
- Guly Do Prado
- Gustavo Assunção
- Gustavo Bochecha
- Helinho
- Helton Da Silva
- Henrique
- Hilton Moreira
- Hugo Souza
- Hulk
- Humberlito Borges
- Igor Julio
- Isael
- Ivana Fuso
- Jacksen F. Tiago
- Jackson
- Jailson
- Jairzinho
- Jajá
- Jefferson
- Jeffinho
- Jemerson
- Jhonson
- Jô
- João Gomes
- Joao Mendes
- João Pedro
- Joao Victor
- Joaquim Henrique
- Joelinton
- John Kennedy
- Jonas Toró
- Jonata
- Cafu
- Jonathan Reis
- Jonathas de Jesus
- Jordi Martins
- Jorge
- José Kléberson
- Juan Jesus
- Jucilei
- Junior Baiano
- Brandão
- Júnior Brumado
- Junior Messias
- Junior Dos Santos
- Júnior
- Júnior Urso
- Jussiê
- Kaio Jorge
- Kaká
- Kanu
- Kayky
- Kaylane Vieira
- Kelvin
- Everton Kempes
- Kerolin
- Kim
- Klebinho
- Laís Araújo
- Léo Júnior
- Léo Lelis
- Letícia Izidoro
- Liédson
- Lincoln
- Lincoln
- Lino
- Lorran
- Luany
- Lucas
- Lucas Sena
- Luciana
- Luciano Oliveira
- Luciano
- Ludmila
- Luís Fabiano
- Luís Oliveira
- Luis Phelipe
- Luiz Gustavo
- Luis Henrique
- Lulinha
- Maicon
- Maicosuel
- Marcelinho
- Marcelo
- Márcio Amoroso
- Márcio Nobre
- Márcio Senna
- Marcos Assunçao
- Marcos Leonardo
- Marcos Senna - naturalised Spanish footballer
- Marcos Vinicius
- Mariano
- Marinho
- Marlon
- Marquinhos
- Marquinhos Cipriano
- Matheus Babi
- Matheus Cunha
- Matheus Davó
- Matheus Fernandes
- Matheus Nunes
- Matheus Salustiano
- Matheuzinho
- Mauro Júnior
- Mayke
- Mazinho
- Mehmet Aurelio - naturalised Turkish footballer
- Micael
- Michel Bastos
- Michel
- Miguel Silveira
- Moacir Barbosa
- Müller
- Muralha
- Murilo Costa
- Naldo
- Neymar, through his father
- Nikão
- Nilton Santos
- Obina
- Patrick de Paula
- Paulão
- Paulo Assunção
- Paulo Henrique
- Paulo Sergio
- Pedrinho
- Pelé
- Rafael
- Rafael Silva
- Rafaelson - naturalised Vietnamese footballer
- Raphinha
- Raul Gustavo
- Rayanne Machado
- Reginaldo Ferreira
- Reinaldo
- Reinier Jesus
- Renan Lodi
- Renyer
- Ricardo Oliveira
- Richard
- Rick
- Riquelme Fillipi
- Rivaldo
- Rodrigo Moreno - naturalised Spanish footballer
- Rodrigo Becão
- Rodrigo Freitas
- Rodrigo Muniz
- Rodrygo
- Romarinho
- Ronaldão
- Ronaldo Názario
- Ronan Falcão
- Roque Junior
- Rwan Seco
- Samir
- Samuel Lino
- Samuel Xavier
- Savio
- Sidao
- Somalia
- Tainá
- Taina Maranhão
- Tainara
- Taison
- Talisca
- Talison
- Talles Costa
- Talles Magno
- Tayla
- Taylon Correa
- Tchê Tchê
- Tetê
- Thaís
- Thaís Lima
- Thiago
- Thiago Mendes
- Tinga
- Vampeta
- Vanderlan
- Vinicius Tobias
- Viola
- Vitor Roque
- Vlademir
- Washington Alves
- Marcos Wendel
- Wendell
- Weslen Júnior
- Wesley Ribeiro
- Wesley Moraes
- William Matheus
- Willians
- Zizinho
- Alex Rodrigo Dias da Costa
- Alex Teixeira
- Anderson
- Antony
- Carlos Miguel
- David Neres
- Dida
- Douglas Costa
- Eduardo Bauermann
- Fernandinho
- Formiga
- Fred
- Gabriel Jesus
- Gilberto
- Gilberto Silva
- Grafite
- Juan
- Júlio Baptista
- Júlio César
- Kléber
- Leonidas da Silva
- Lucas Ribeiro
- Luiz Adriano
- Malcom
- Marcelo
- Marcos de Paula
- Mineiro
- Moisés
- Paulinho
- Raíssa Bahia
- Ramires
- Richarlison
- Roberto Carlos
- Robinho
- Robson Bambu
- Rodrigo
- Roger Machado
- Ronaldinho
- Sammir - naturalised Croatian footballer
- Sidnei
- Tarciane
- Vágner Love
- Vinícius Júnior
- Vitória Yaya
- Willian
- Yago Pikachu
- Yasmim
- Zé Roberto

=== Capoeira ===
- Amen Santo
- Mestre Bimba
- Manuel dos Reis Machado
- Cobra Mansa
- João Grande
- João Pereira dos Santos
- Pedro Moraes Trindade
- Vicente Ferreira Pastinha
- Pé de Chumbo

=== Other sports ===
- Adhemar Ferreira da Silva – athlete, won two olympic gold medals on the triple jump
- Daiane dos Santos – gymnast
- Rebeca Andrade – gymnast
- Anderson Silva – mixed martial arts fighter, former UFC middleweight champion
- Leandro Barbosa – basketball player
- Nenê – basketball player
- Adílson Rodrigues – boxer
- Janeth Arcain – basketball player
- Adriano Moraes – mixed martial artist and former ONE Flyweight World Champion
- Jadel Gregório – athlete
- Nelson Prudêncio – athlete
- Zuluzinho – mixed martial arts fighter
- Diogo Silva – Taekwondo gold medal in 2007 Panamerican Games
- Robson Caetano – athlete
- Rafaela Silva – judoka
- Rayssa Leal – skateboarder
- Rei Zulu – vale-tudo fighter
- Joice Silva – freestyle wrestler
- Rosângela Santos – track and field sprint athlete
- Beatriz Souza – judoka
- Fabiana Claudino – volleyball player
- Fernanda Garay – volleyball player
- Cristiano Felício – basketball player
- Héritier Lumumba – australian rules footballer
- Eugenio Tadeu – mixed martial arts fighter
- Valdemar Santana – martial artist

=== Actors ===
- Alexandre Rodrigues
- Alice Braga
- Camila Pitanga
- Darlan Cunha
- Dhu Moraes
- Douglas Silva
- Eliezer Gomes
- Grande Otelo
- Isabel Fillardis
- Leandro Firmino
- Lourdes de Oliveira
- Lázaro Ramos
- Milton Gonçalves
- Preta Gil
- Ronnie Marruda
- Thiago Martins
- Ruth de Souza
- Seu Jorge
- Sônia Braga
- Taís Araújo
- Yaya DaCosta
- Zeze Motta
- Lateef Crowder dos Santos
- Abdias do Nascimento

=== Fashion ===
- Deise Nunes
- Emanuela de Paula
- Lais Ribeiro
- Monalysa Alcântara
- Raissa Santana
- Deise Nunes

=== Music ===
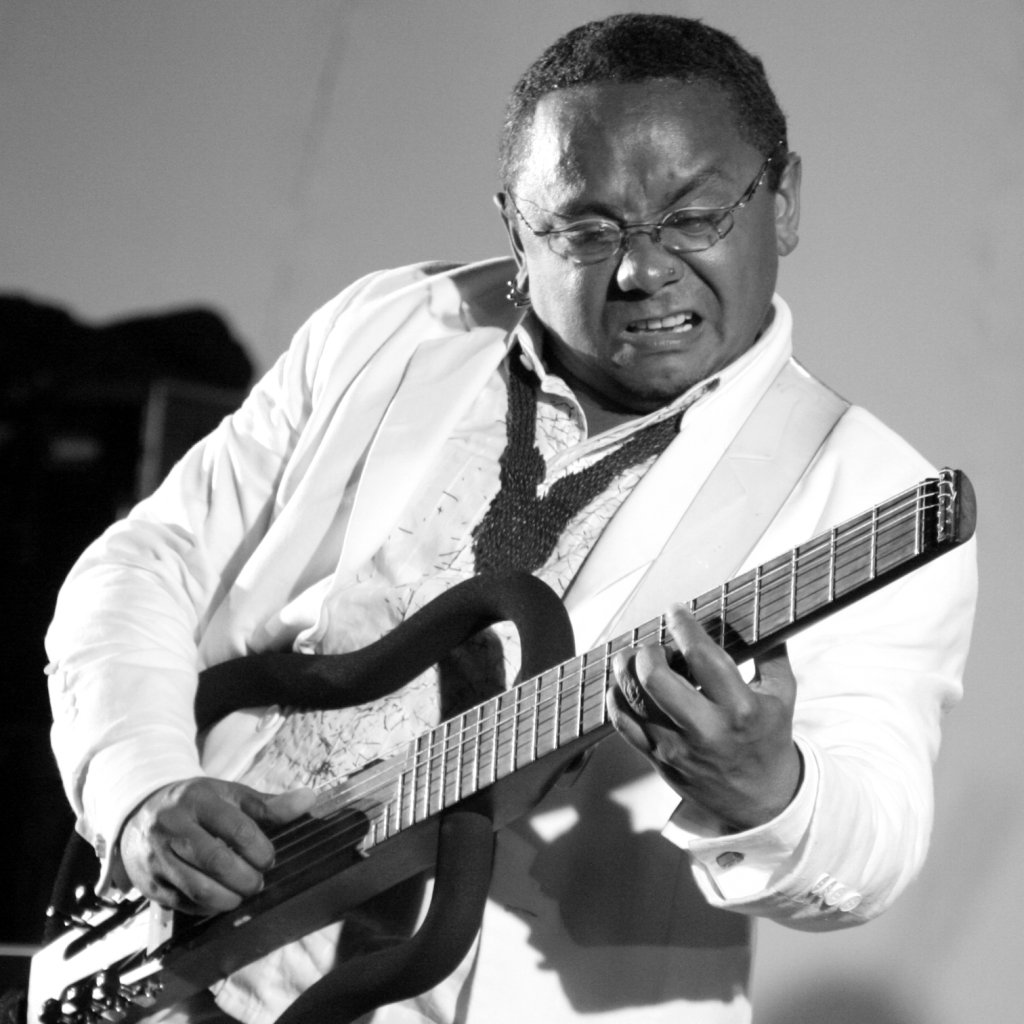
Chico César

- Alcione
- Alexandre Pires
- Almir Guineto
- Any Gabrielly
- Bezerra da Silva
- Carlinhos Brown
- Cartola
- Chico César
- Clara Nunes
- Marco Antonio Silva
- Wagner Borges Ribeiro de Souza
- Djavan
- Elza Soares
- Emicida
- Emilio Santiago
- Gilberto Gil
- Jair Oliveira
- Jared Gomes
- Jorge Aragão
- Jorge Ben
- Jovelina Pérola Negra
- Karol Conká
- Leci Brandão
- Luciana Mello
- Ludmilla
- Luiz Melodia
- Alex Pereira Barbosa
- Marcelo Maldonado Gomes Peixoto
- Margareth Menezes
- Marisa Monte
- Martinho da Vila
- Mauro Diniz
- Milton Nascimento
- Nelson Cavaquinho
- Nelson Sargento
- Nei Lopes
- Noca da Portela
- Os Tincoãs
- Paula Lima
- Paulinho da Viola
- Pixinguinha
- Péricles
- Racionais MC's
- Rappin' Hood
- Sandra de Sá
- Jorge Mário da Silva
- Sérgio Mendes
- Taio Cruz
- Tati Quebra Barraco
- Tim Maia
- Vanessa da Mata
- Wilson Moreira
- Zé Keti

=== Politics ===
- Alceu Collares - Rio Grande do Sul State Governor (1991–1994)
- Abdias do Nascimento - Federal Deputy and Nobel Prize for Peace nominee
- Benedita da Silva - first female senator in Brazil, Rio de Janeiro State Governor (2002), Minister of Social Action
- Celso Pitta - São Paulo City Mayor (1997–2000)
- João Alves Filho - Sergipe State Governor (1983–1987; 1991–1994)
- Francisco de Sales Torres Homem, Viscount of Inhomirim - Minister of Finance (1858–1859, 1870–1871)
- Francisco José do Nascimento (1839–1914) - Abolitionist
- Paulo Paim - Federal Deputy and Senator
- Otavio Mangabeira - Governor of Bahia, and Minister of Foreign Affairs (1926–1930)
- Carlos Marighella - politician, writer and guerrilla fighter
- Romário - Federal Senator from Rio de Janeiro
- Erika Hilton - Federal Deputy for São Paulo

=== Supreme Court Justices ===
- Joaquim Benedito Barbosa Gomes (since 2003)

=== Military ===
- Henrique Dias - military leader during the Dutch–Portuguese War, was knighted for his services during the two Battles of Guararapes.

=== Writers ===
- Machado de Assis
- Lima Barreto
- Cruz e Sousa
- Joel Rufino dos Santos
- Luís Gama
- Tânia Martins
- José do Patrocínio
- Lourdes Teodoro

=== Science and Technology ===
- Sonia Guimarães - professor and first black Brazilian woman to receive a doctorate in physics
- André Rebouças - engineer
- Milton Santos - geographer, received the Vautrin Lud International Geography Prize in 1994

=== Religion ===
- Dom José Maria "Dom Pelé" Pires - Emerit Archbishop of Paraíba
- Helvécio Martins - first Black to be called as a general authority of the Church of Jesus Christ of Latter-day Saints
- Valdemiro Santiago - evangelical pastor and founder and leader of the Igreja Mundial do Poder de Deus

== Photo-gallery of famous Black Brazilians ==
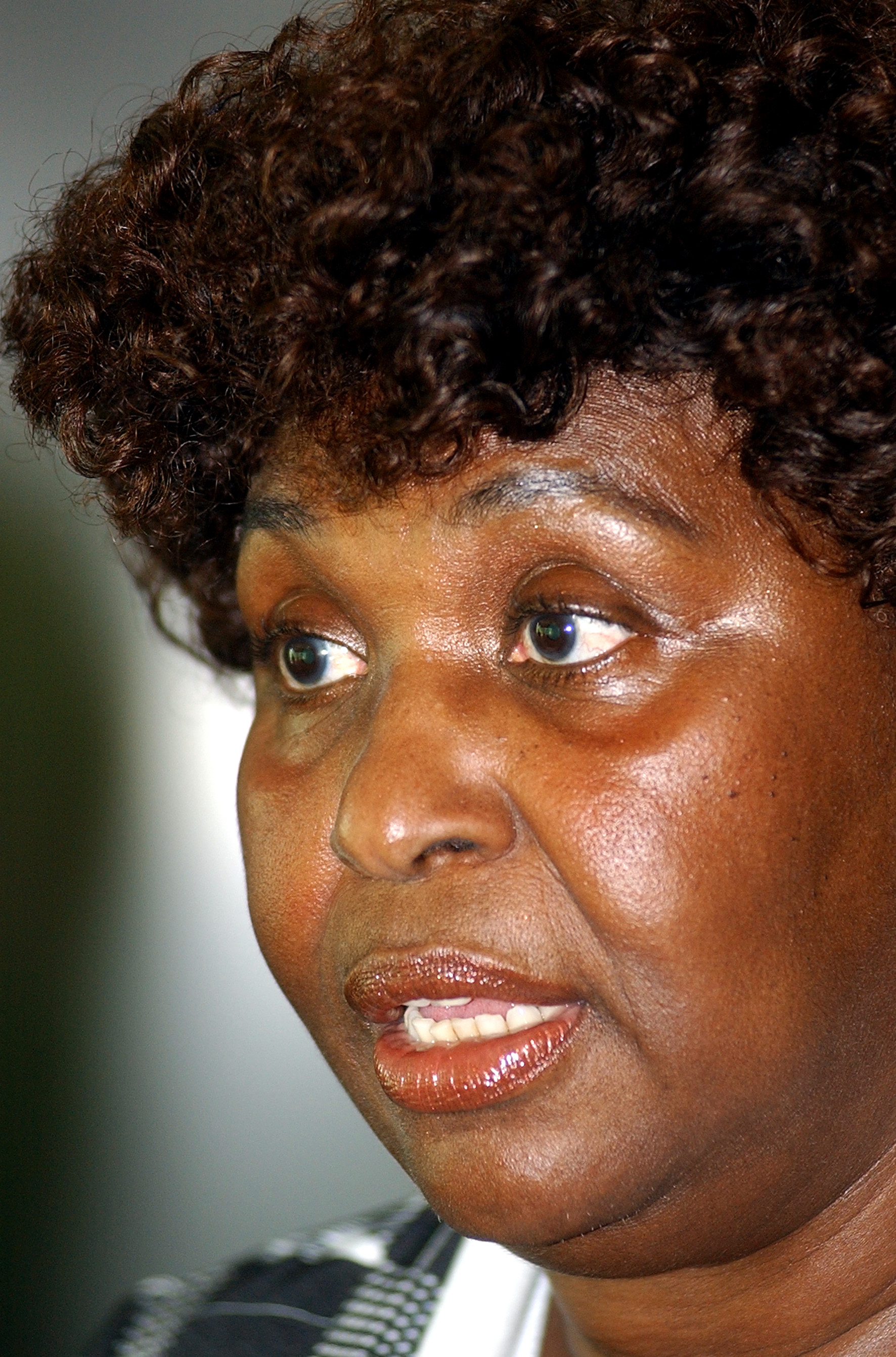
Benedita da Silva

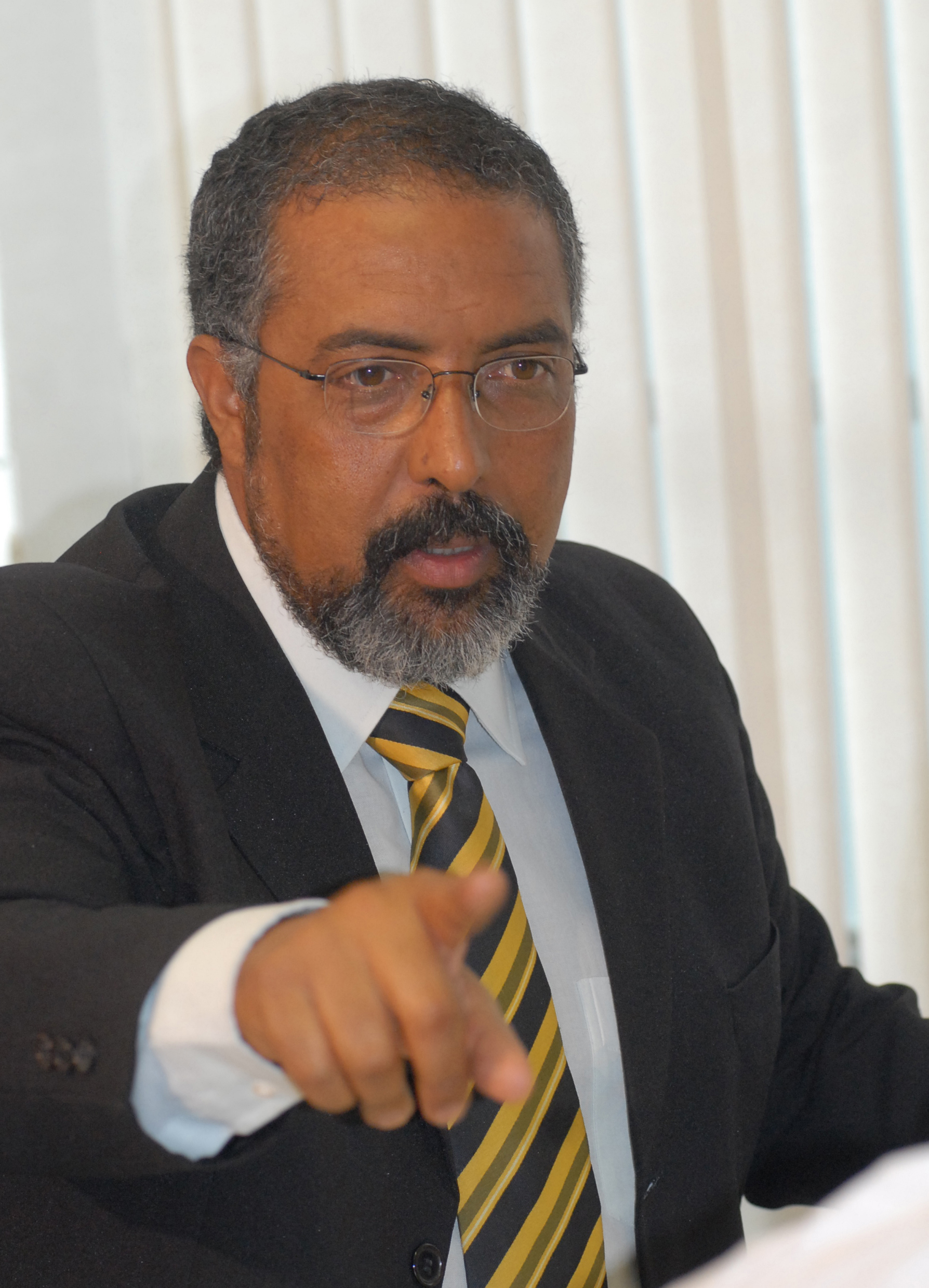
Paulo Paim

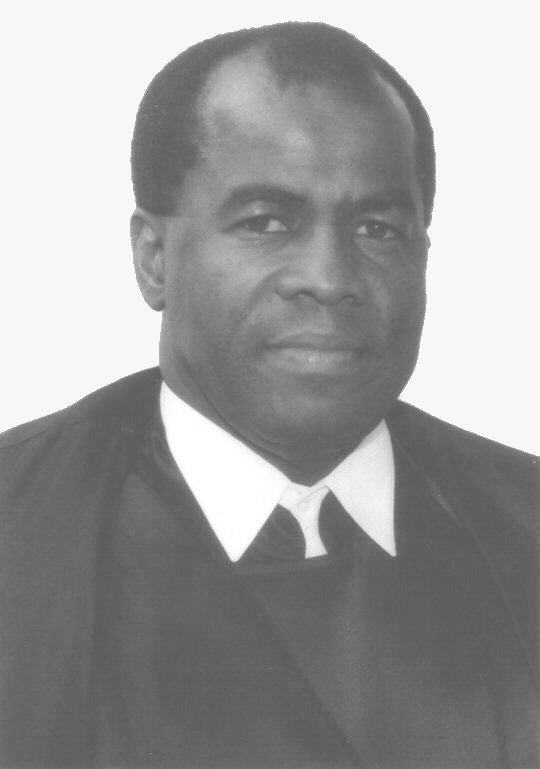
Joaquim Barbosa

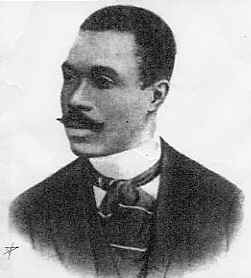
Cruz e Sousa

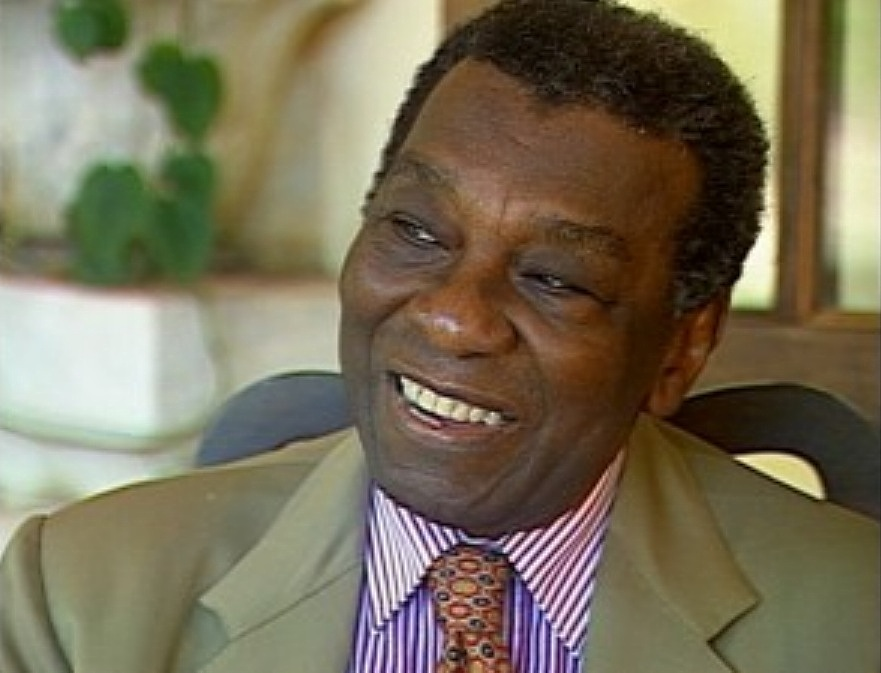
Milton Santos

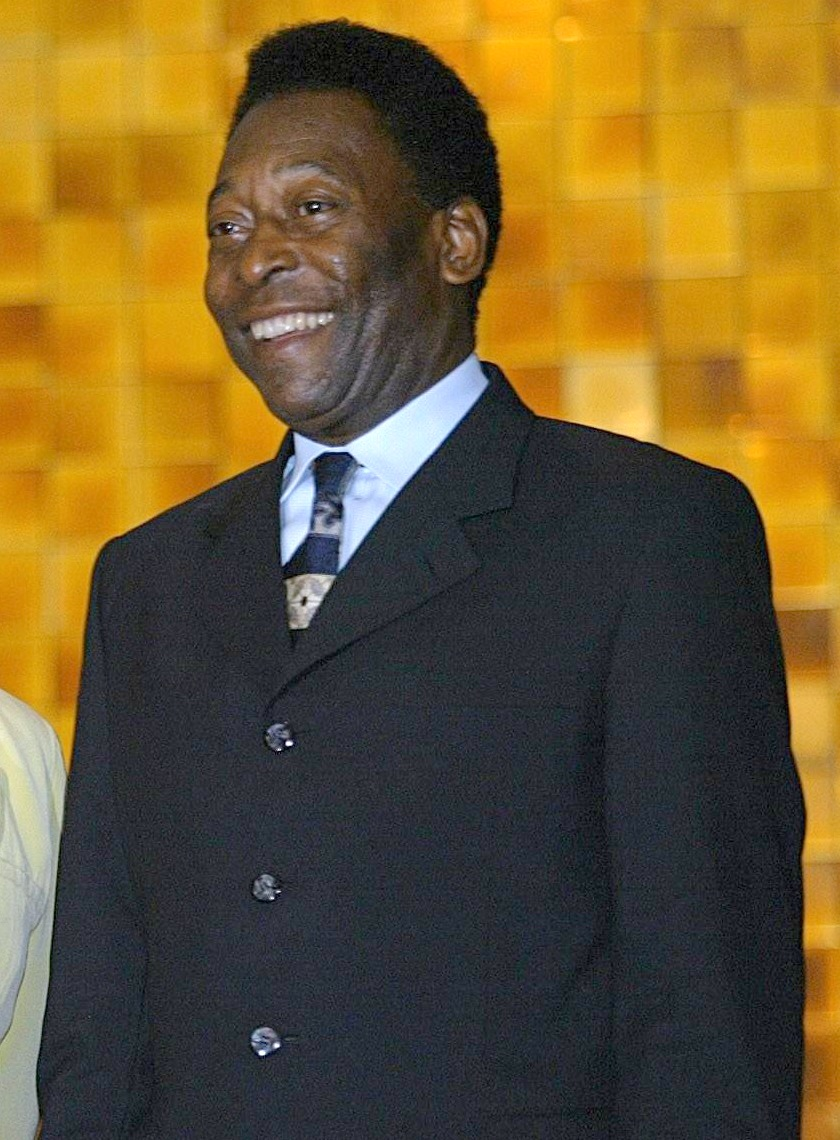
Pelé

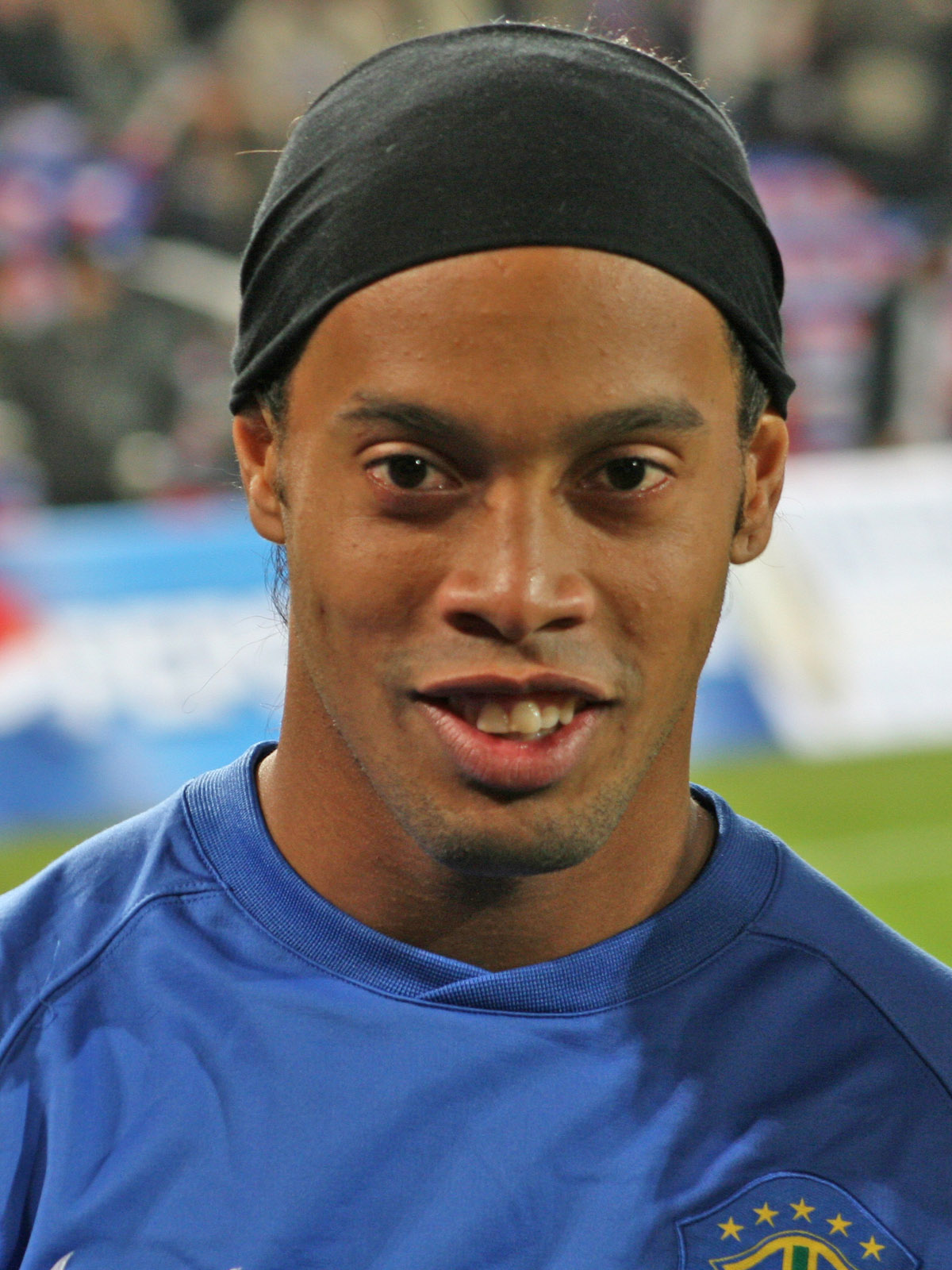
Ronaldinho

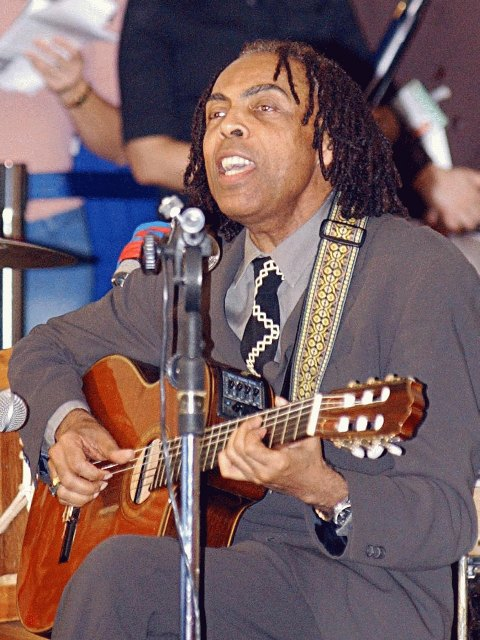
Gilberto Gil

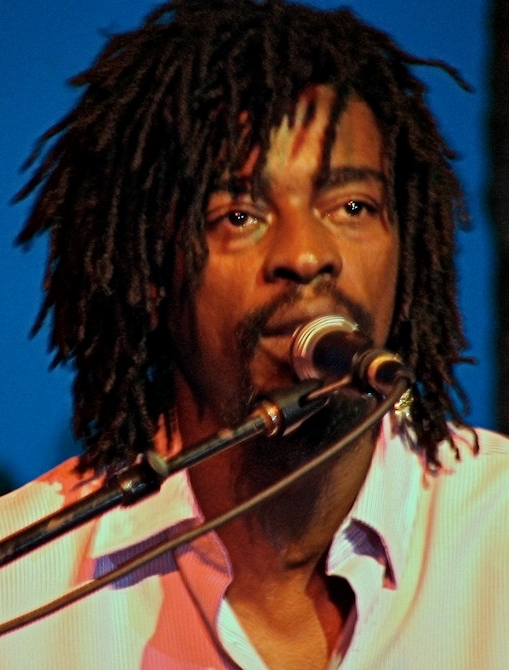
Seu Jorge

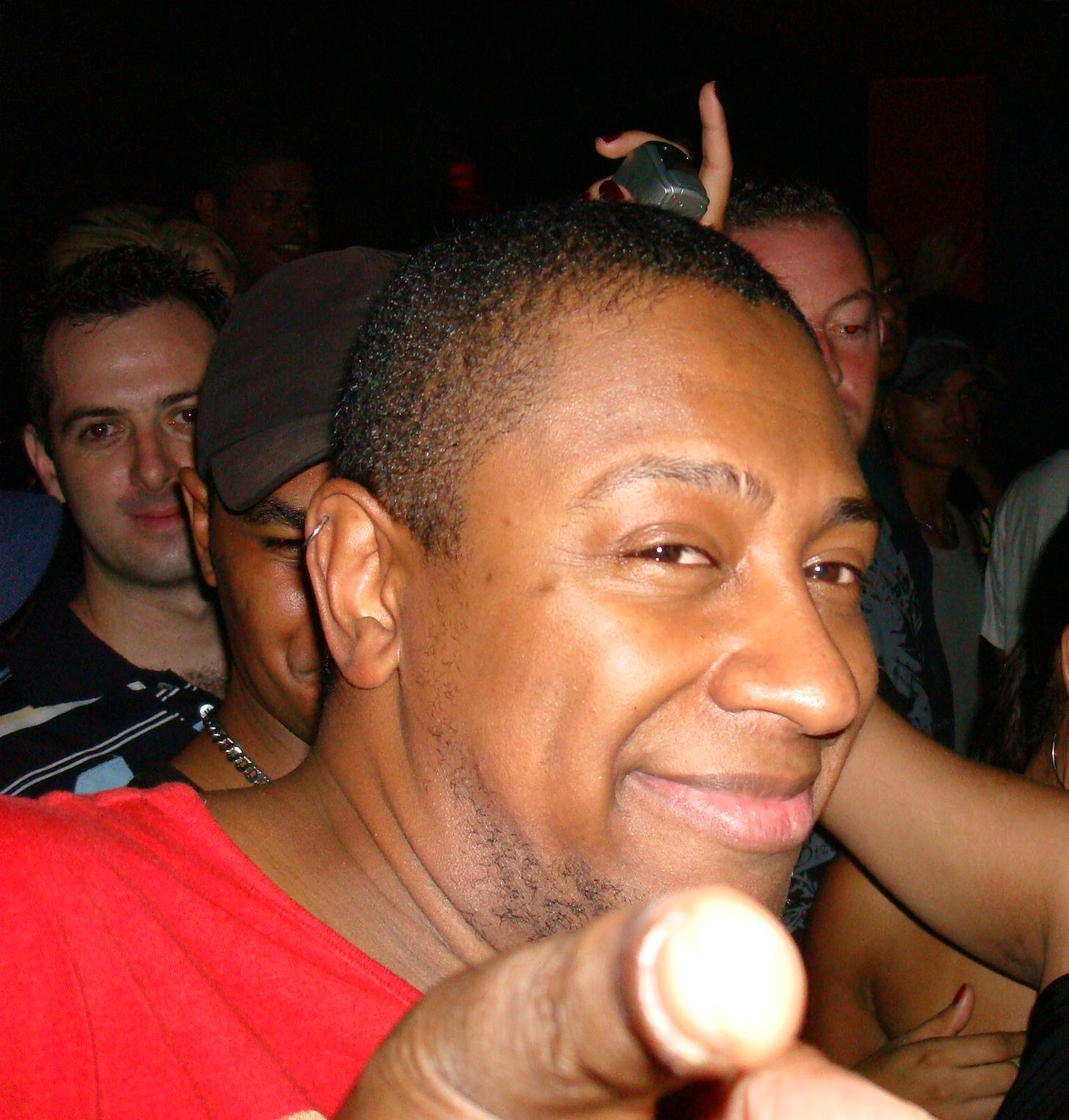
DJ Marky

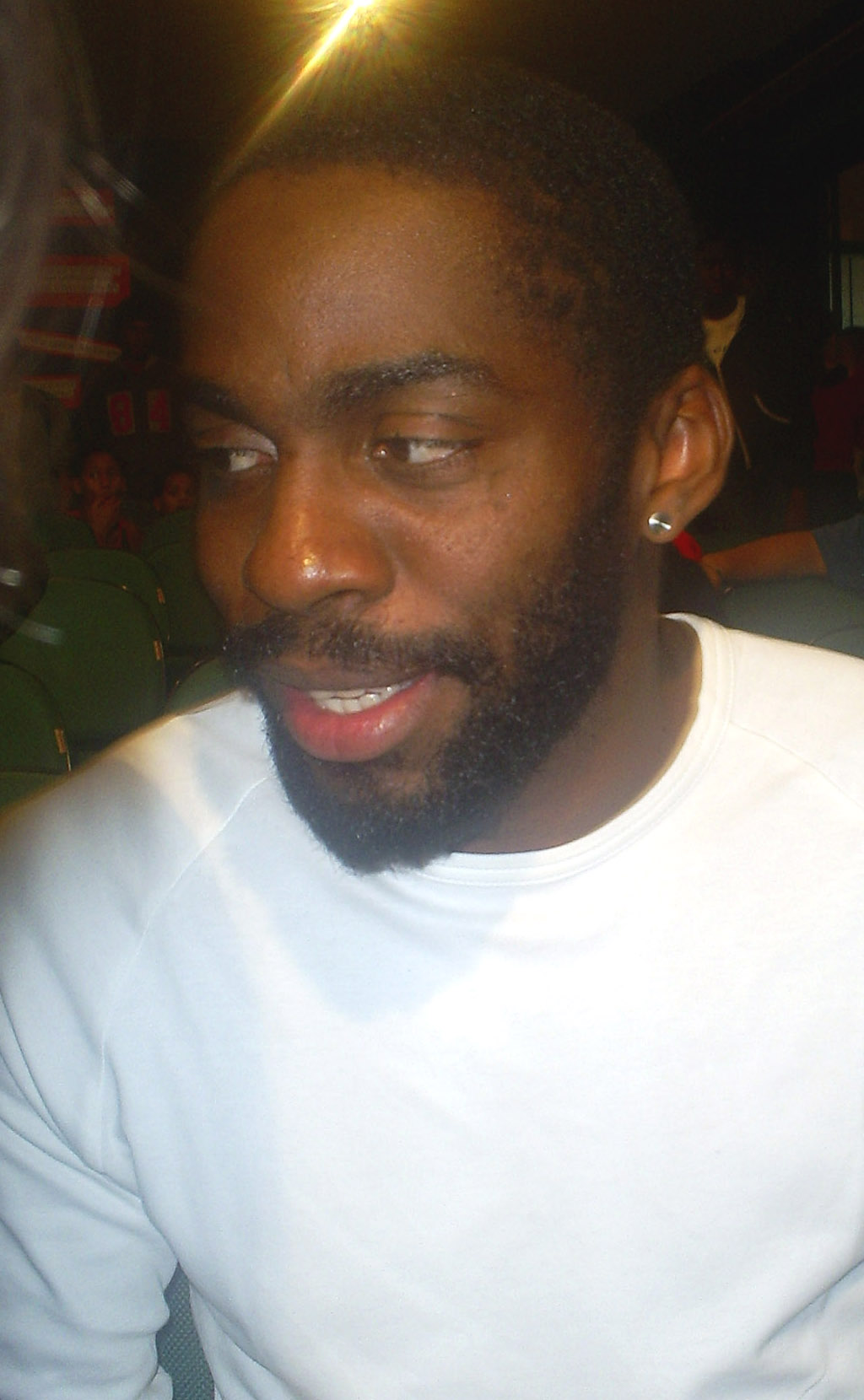
Lázaro Ramos

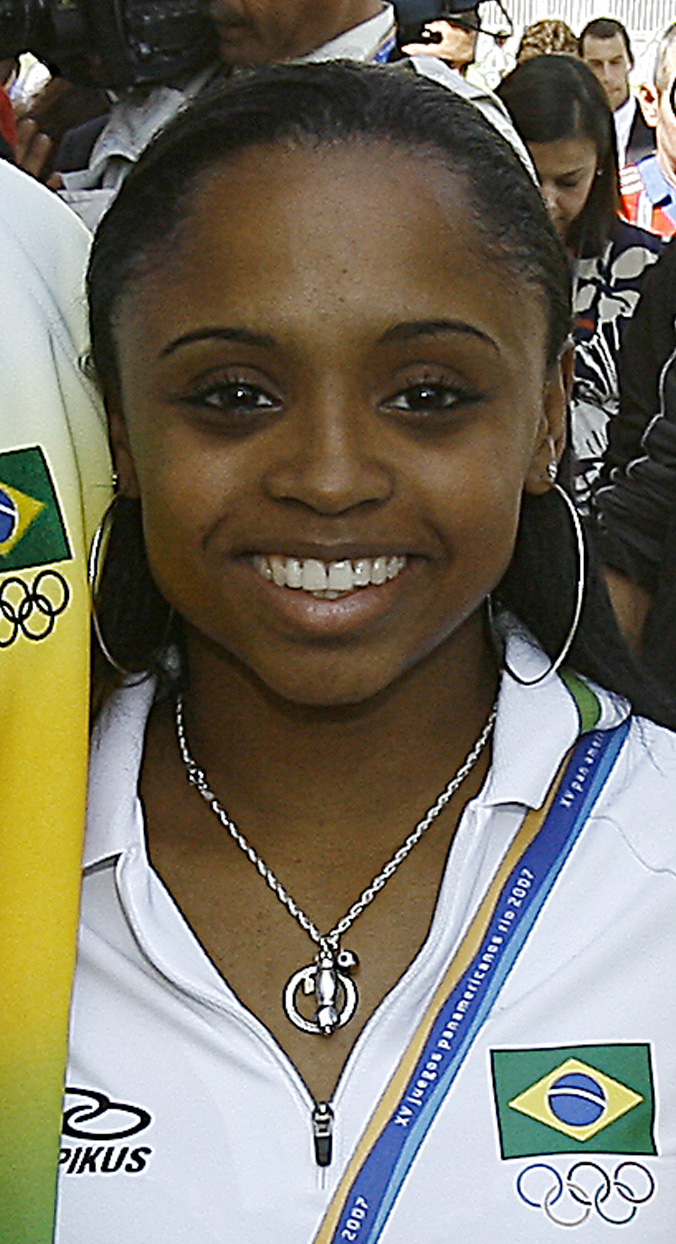
Daiane dos Santos

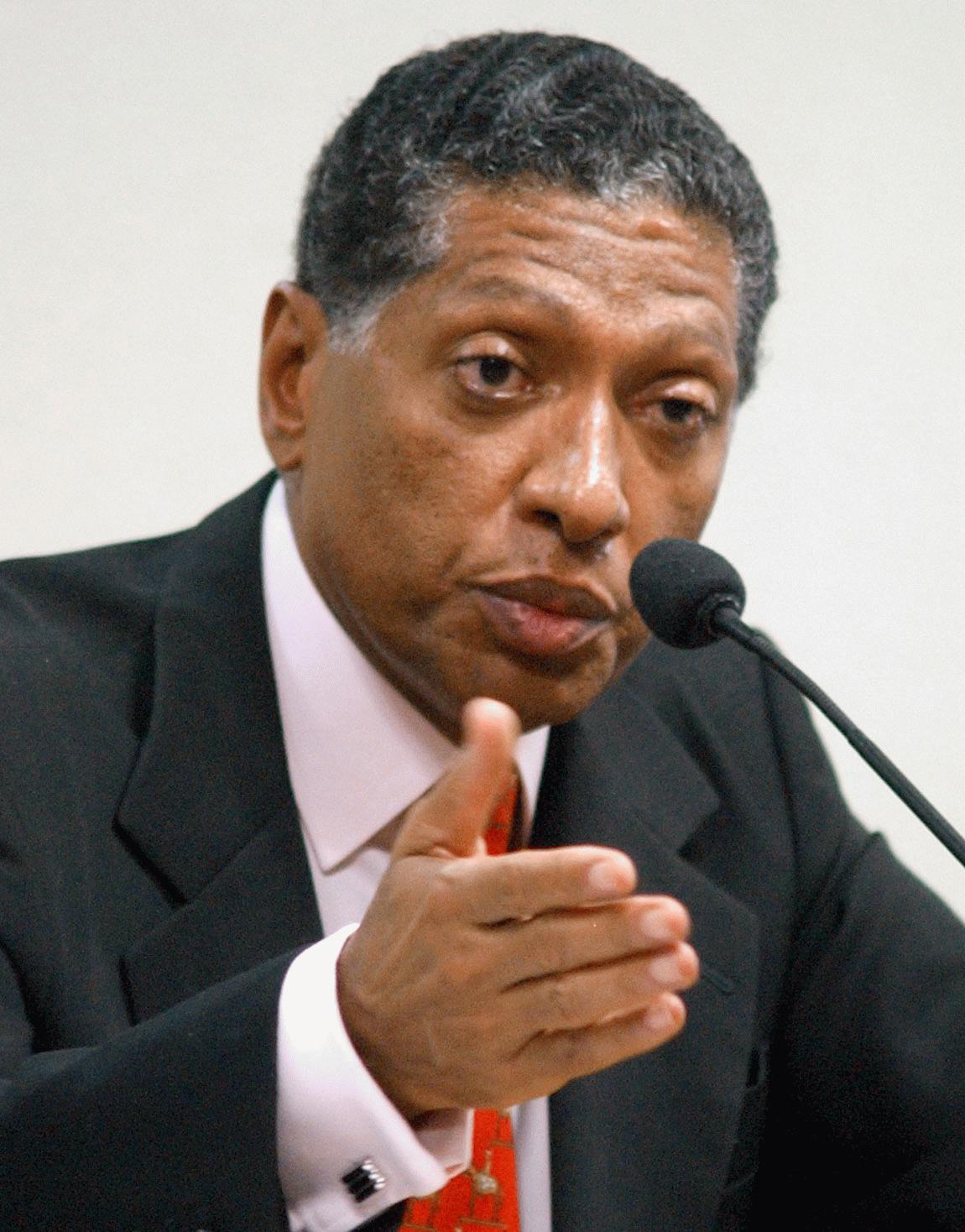
Celso Pitta

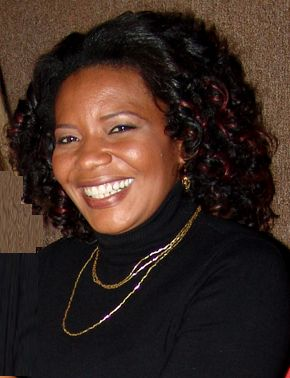
Margareth Menezes

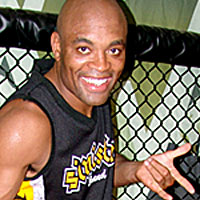
Anderson Silva

== See also ==
- List of topics related to the Black Diaspora
- List of Afro-Latinos
- Race in Brazil
- Demographics of Brazil
- Pardo
- Slavery in Brazil

Other groups

- African American
- Afro-Arab
- Afro-Belizean
- Afro-Cuban
- Afro-Ecuadorian
- Australians of African descent
- Afro-Germans
- Afro-Irish
- Afro-Latino
- Afro-Mexican
- Afro-Peruvian
- Afro-Puerto Rican
- Afro-Trinidadian and Tobagonian
- Black British
- Afro-Caribbean American
- Black Canadians
- Afro-European
- Beta Israel
