= List of Afro-Latinos =

Afro-Latinos or Afro–Latin Americans are Latin Americans who are descended from African slaves brought to Latin America and the Caribbean region during the trans-Atlantic slave trade, who made up 95% of all Africans brought to the Americas.

Afro-Brazilians, Afro-Cubans, Afro-Dominicans, Afro-Hondurans, Afro-Panamanians, Afro–Puerto Ricans, Afro-Colombians, Afro-Mexicans and other Latin Americans are from these African slaves.

The first Africans brought to the New World arrived on the island of Hispaniola (now divided between the Dominican Republic and Haiti). The majority were taken to Brazil. Only 5% of the Africans brought to the Americas went to North America, from whom African Americans are descended.

== Afro–Latin Americans and Afro-Latinos ==
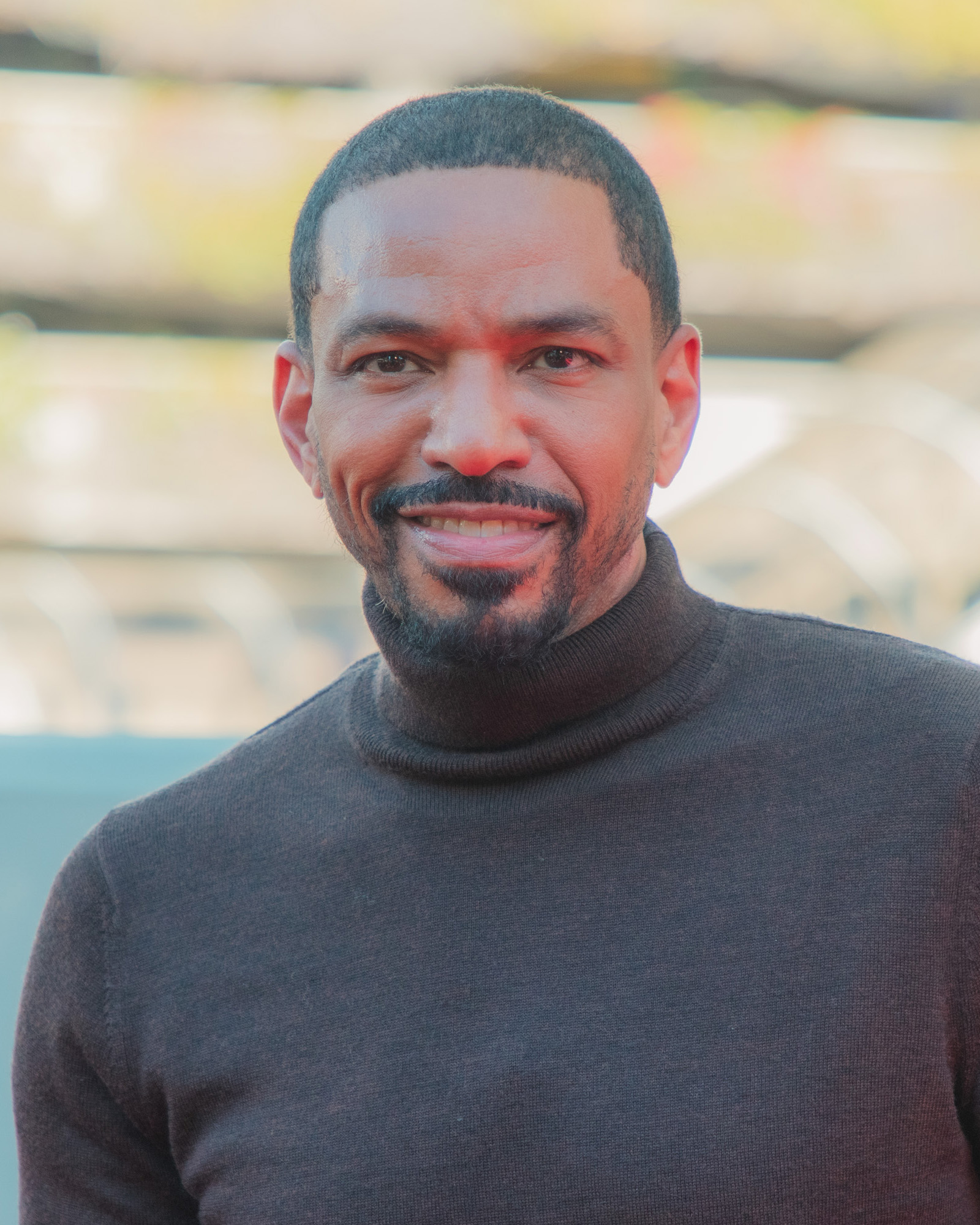
Laz Alonso

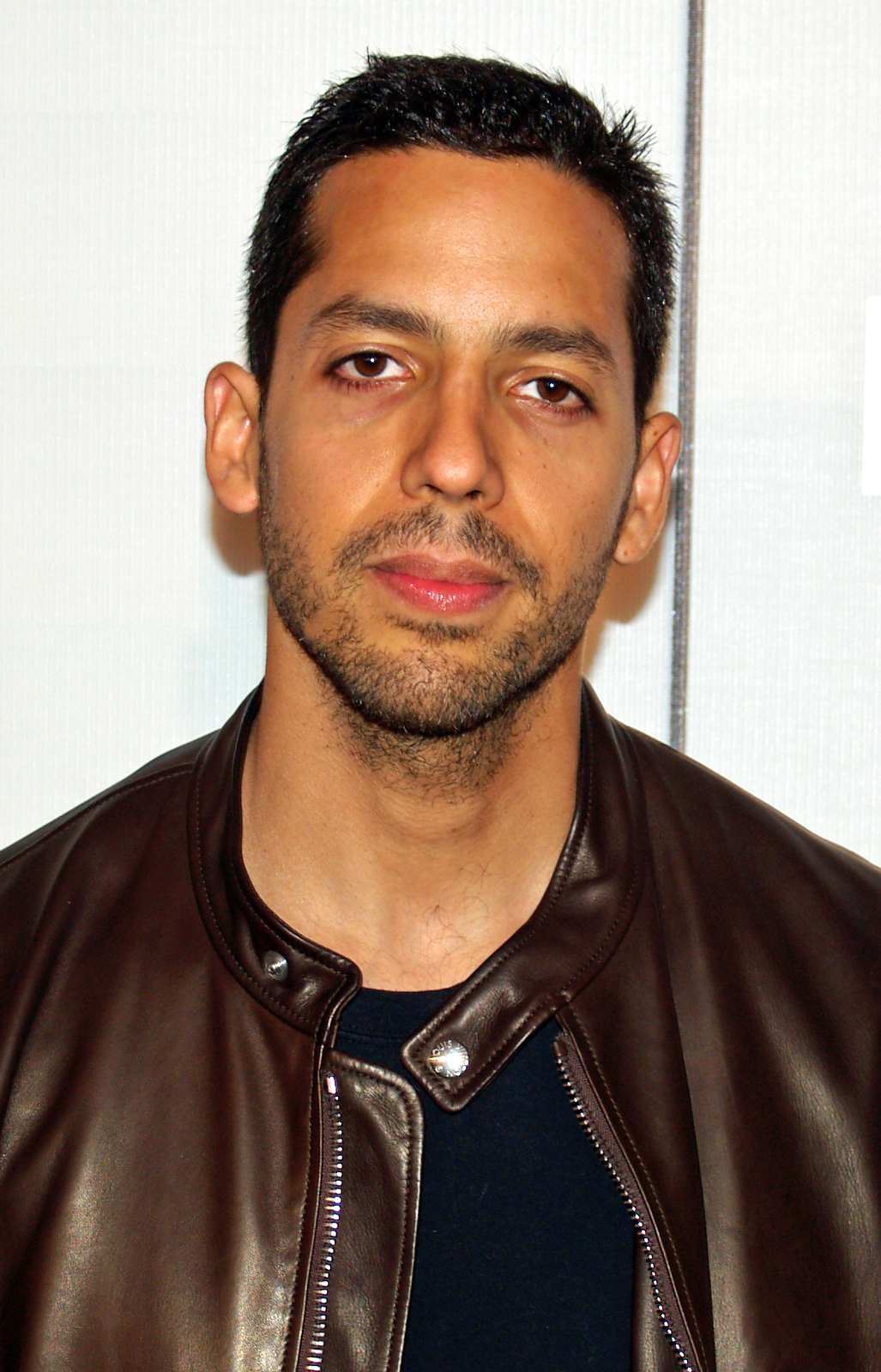
David Blaine

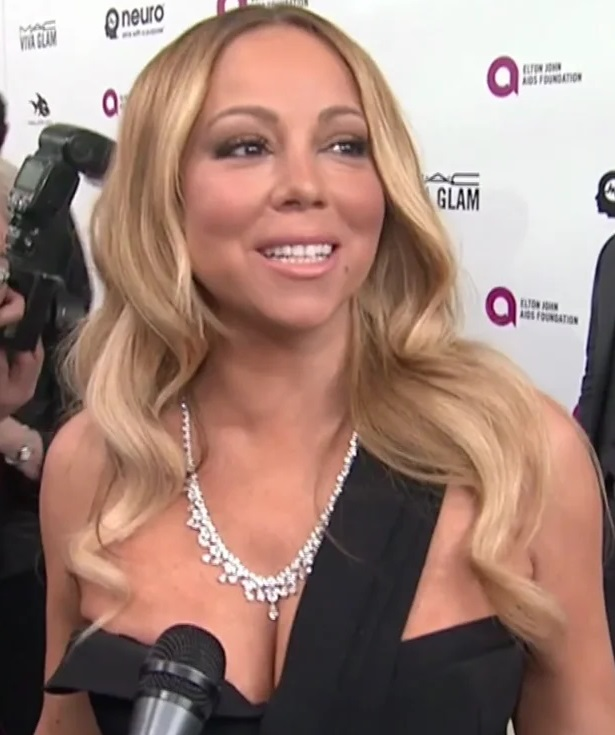
Mariah Carey

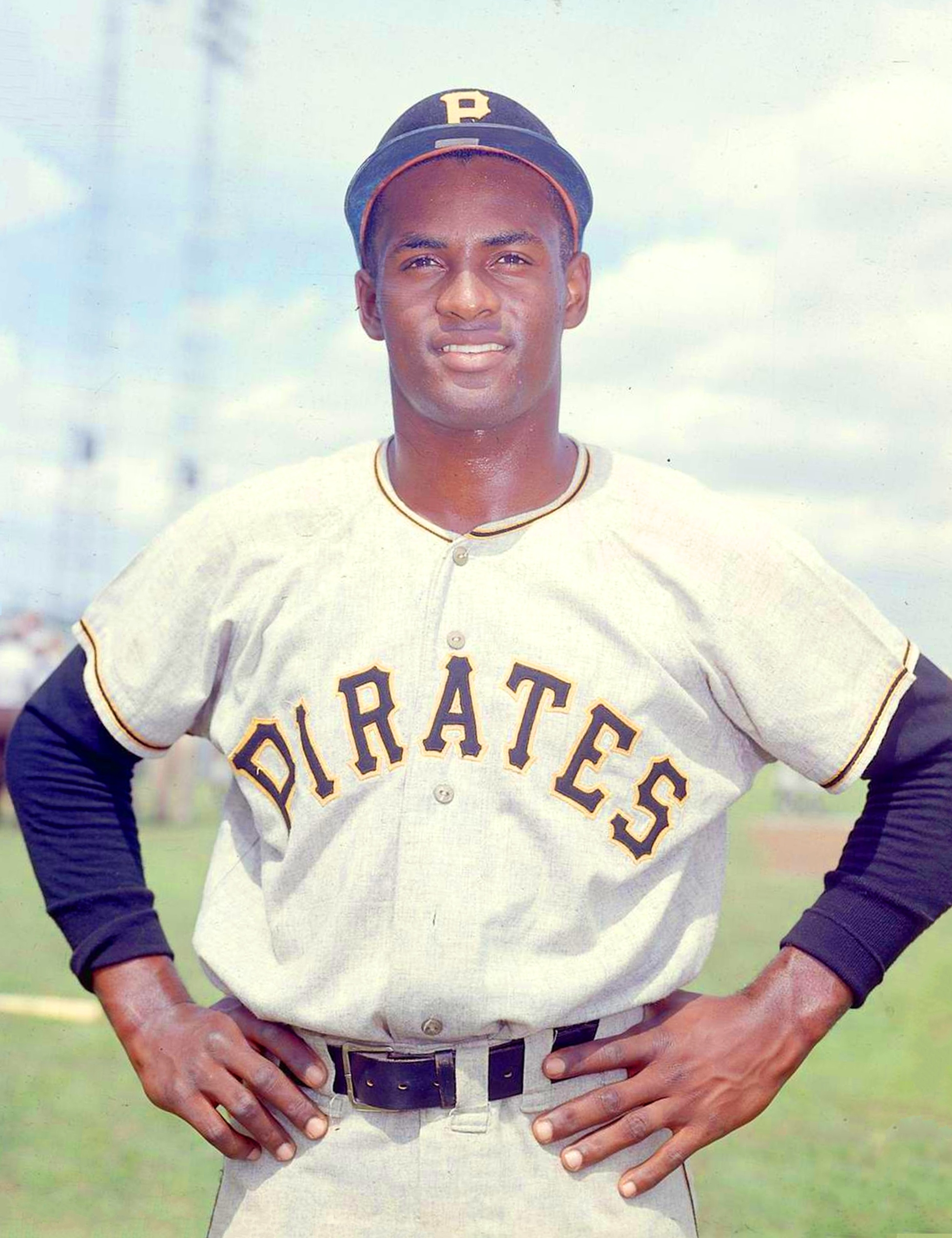
Roberto Clemente

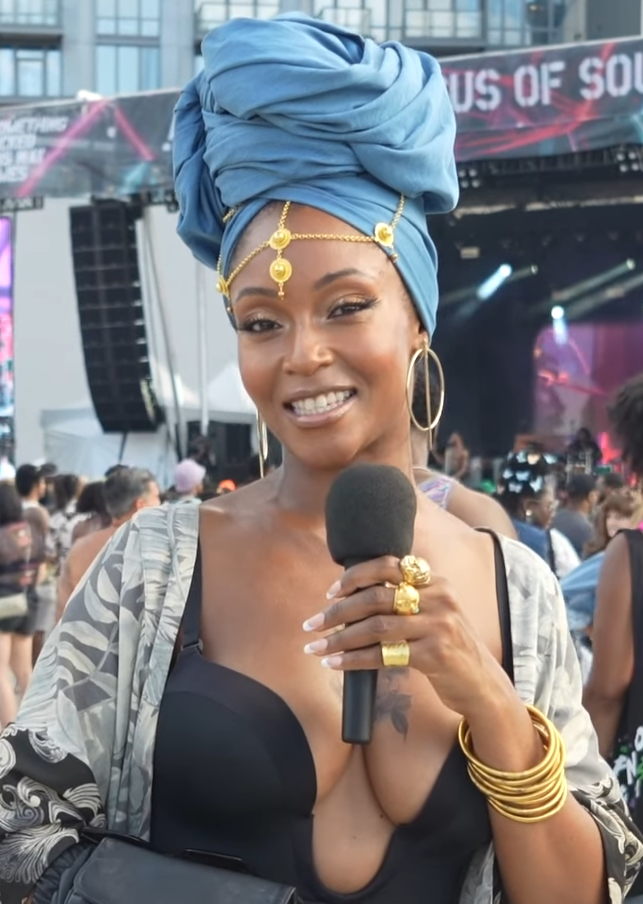
Yaya DaCosta

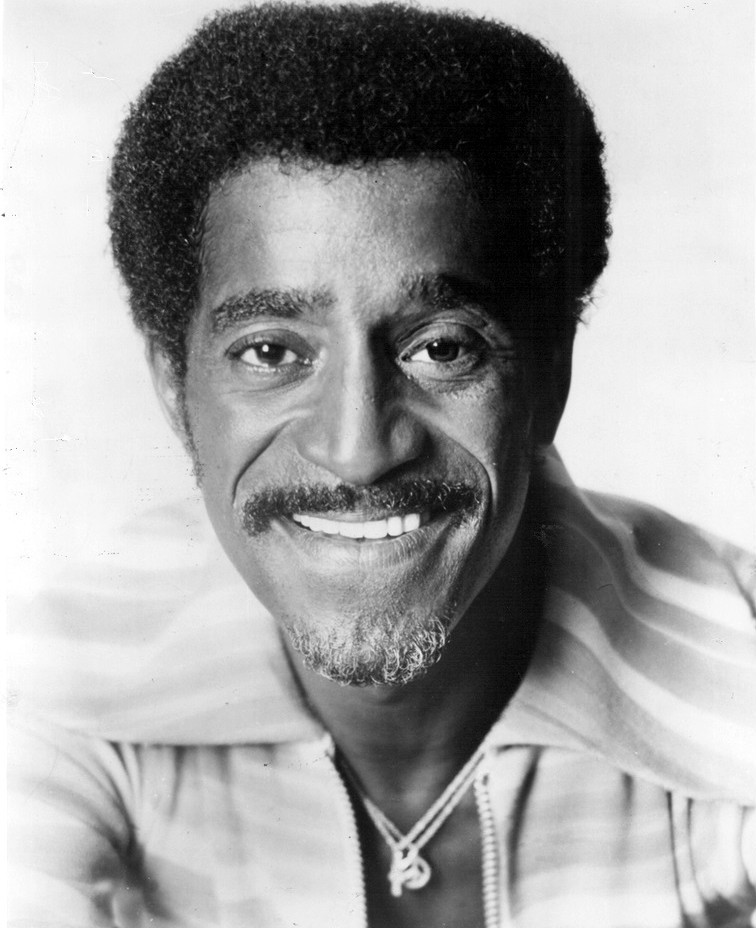
Sammy Davis Jr.

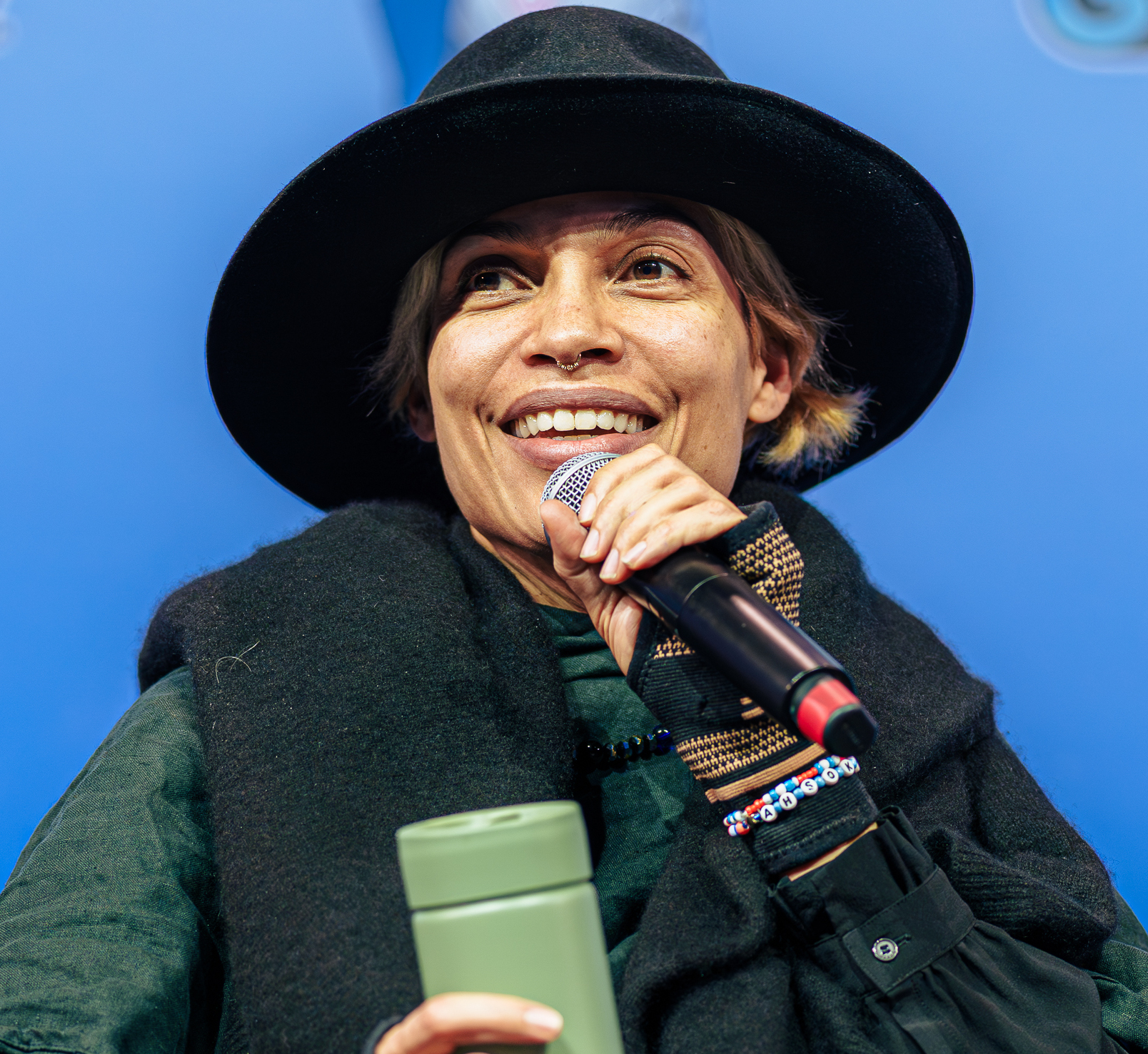
Rosario Dawson

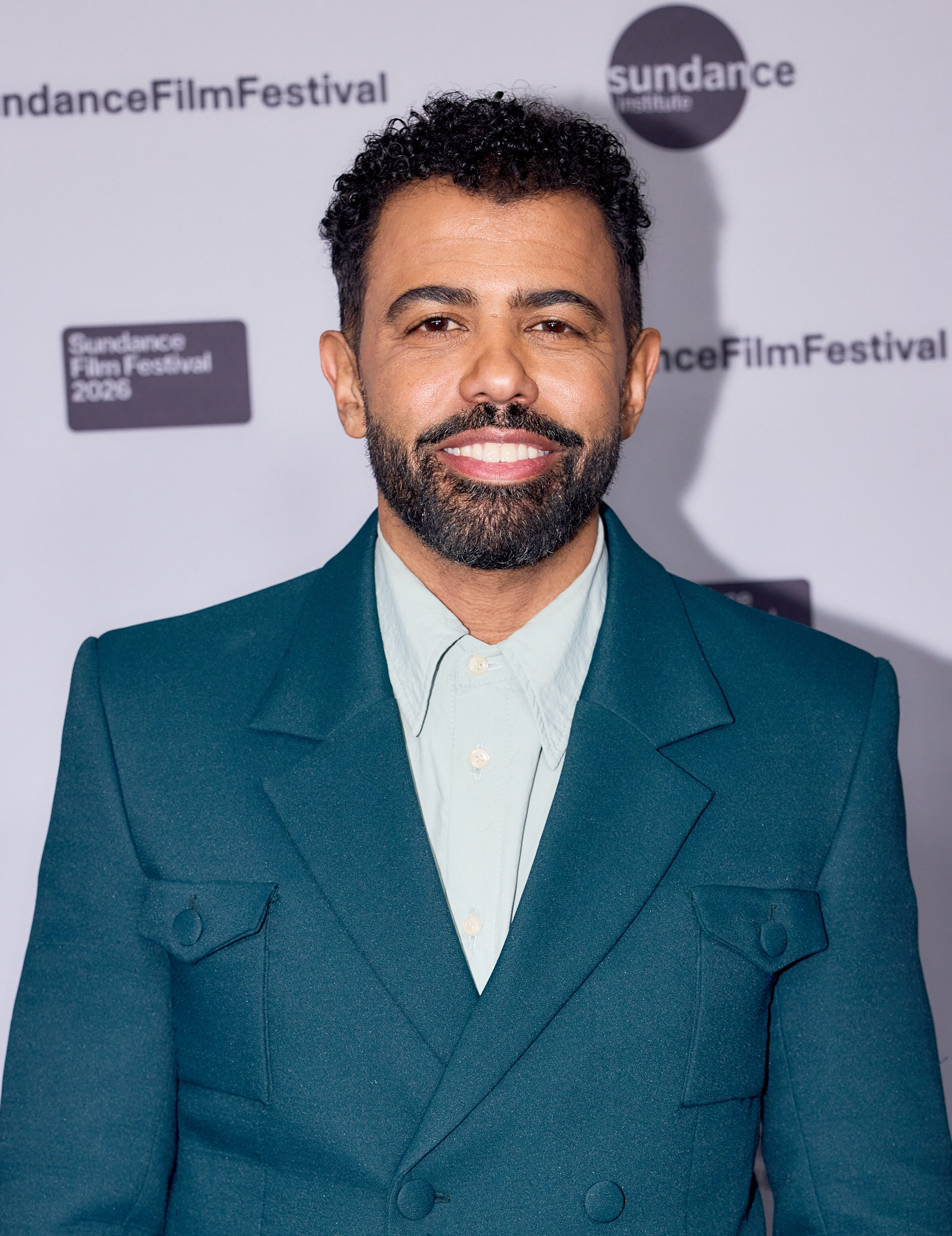
Daveed Diggs

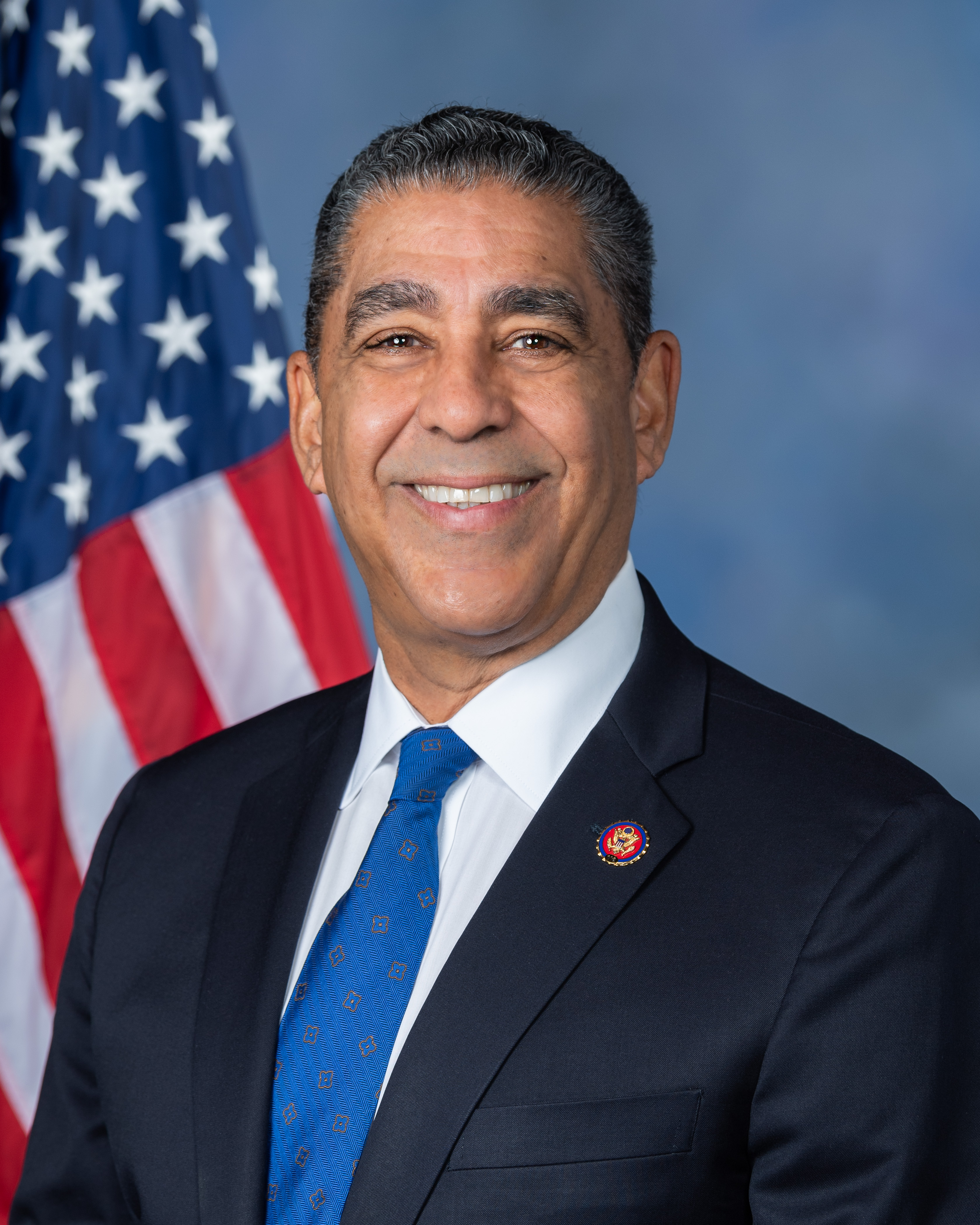
Adriano Espaillat

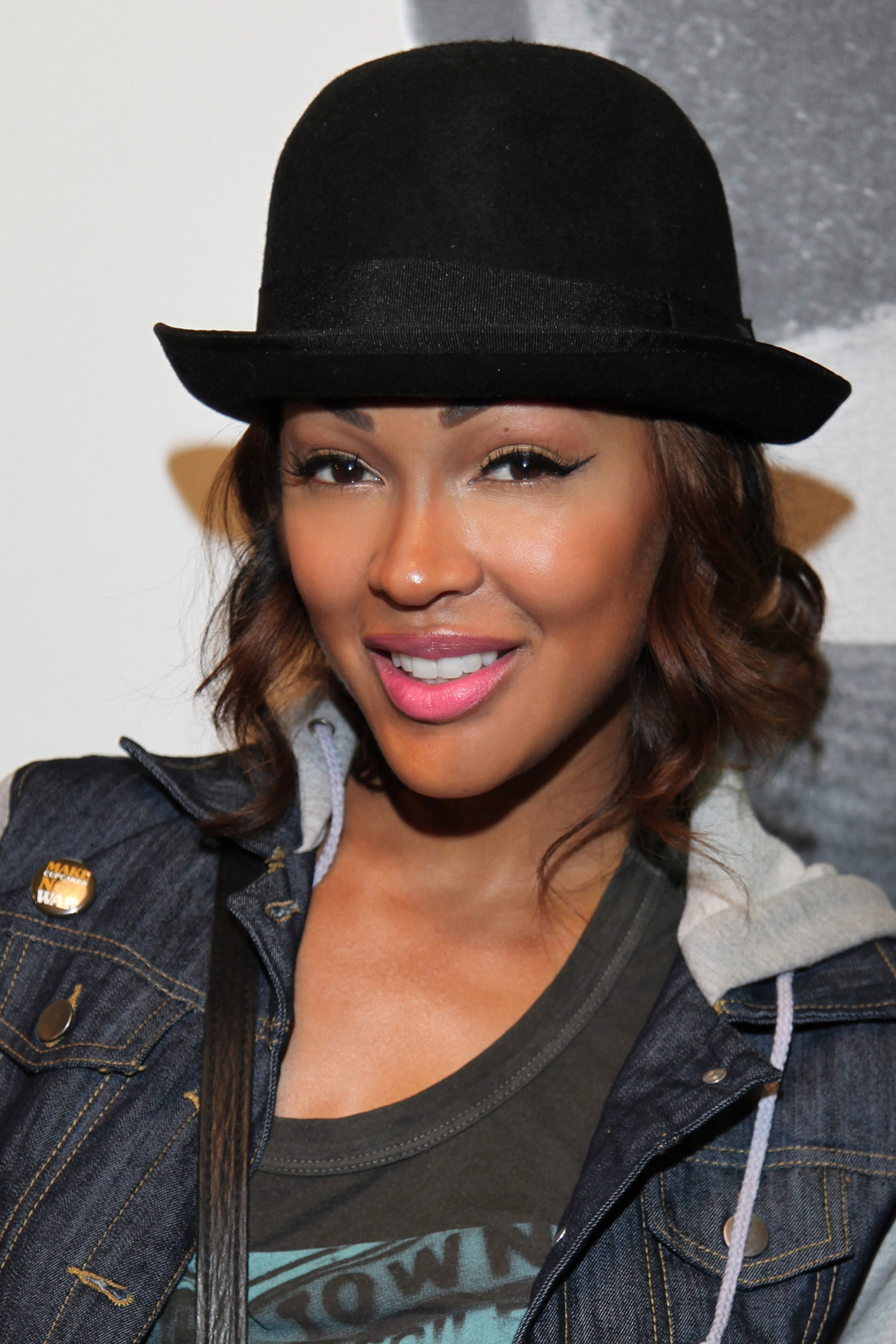
Meagan Good

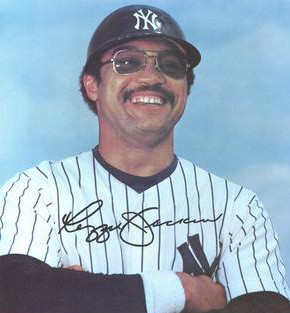
Reggie Jackson

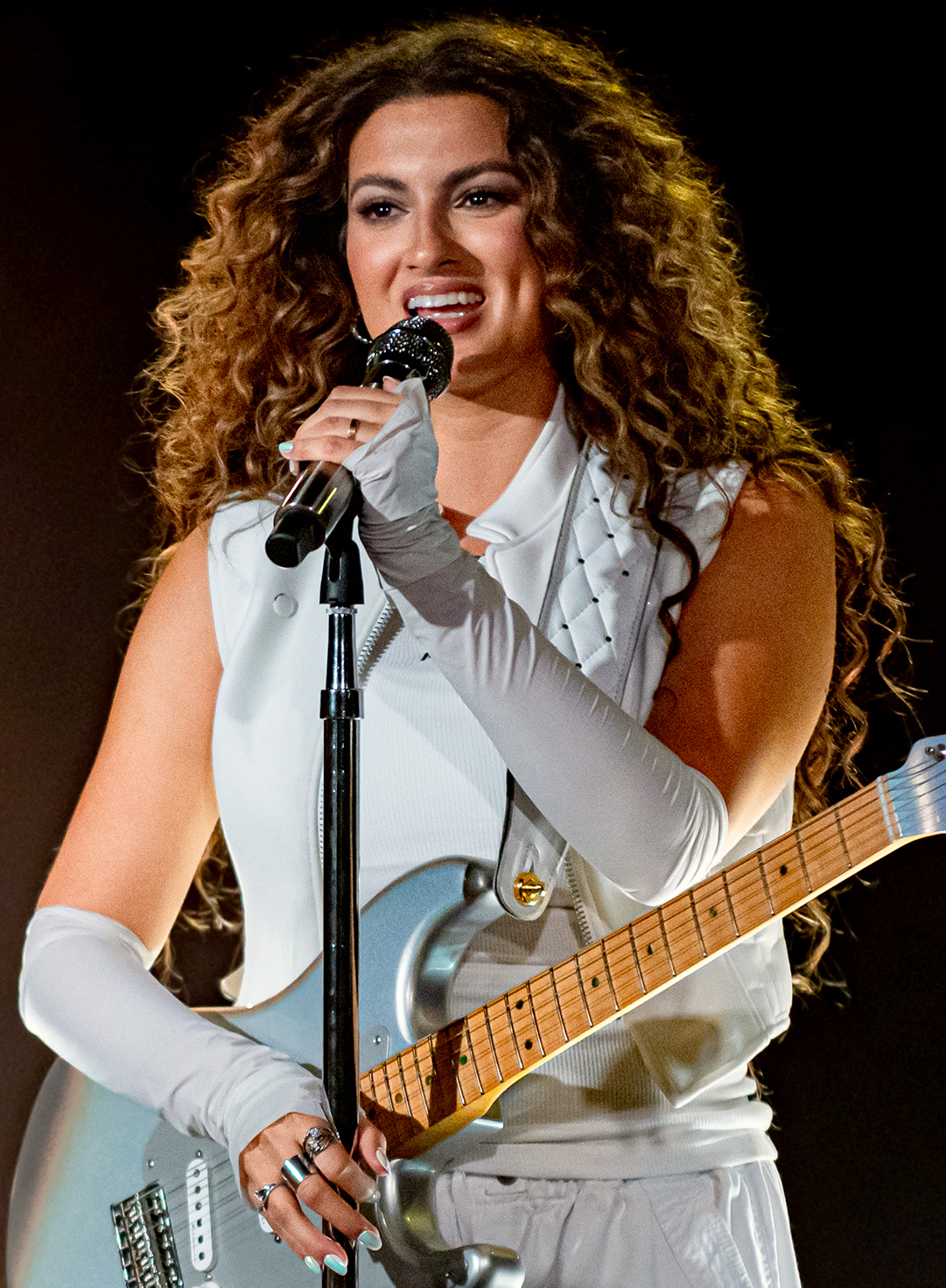
Tori Kelly

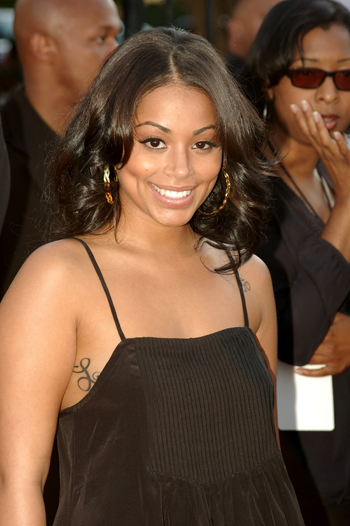
Lauren London

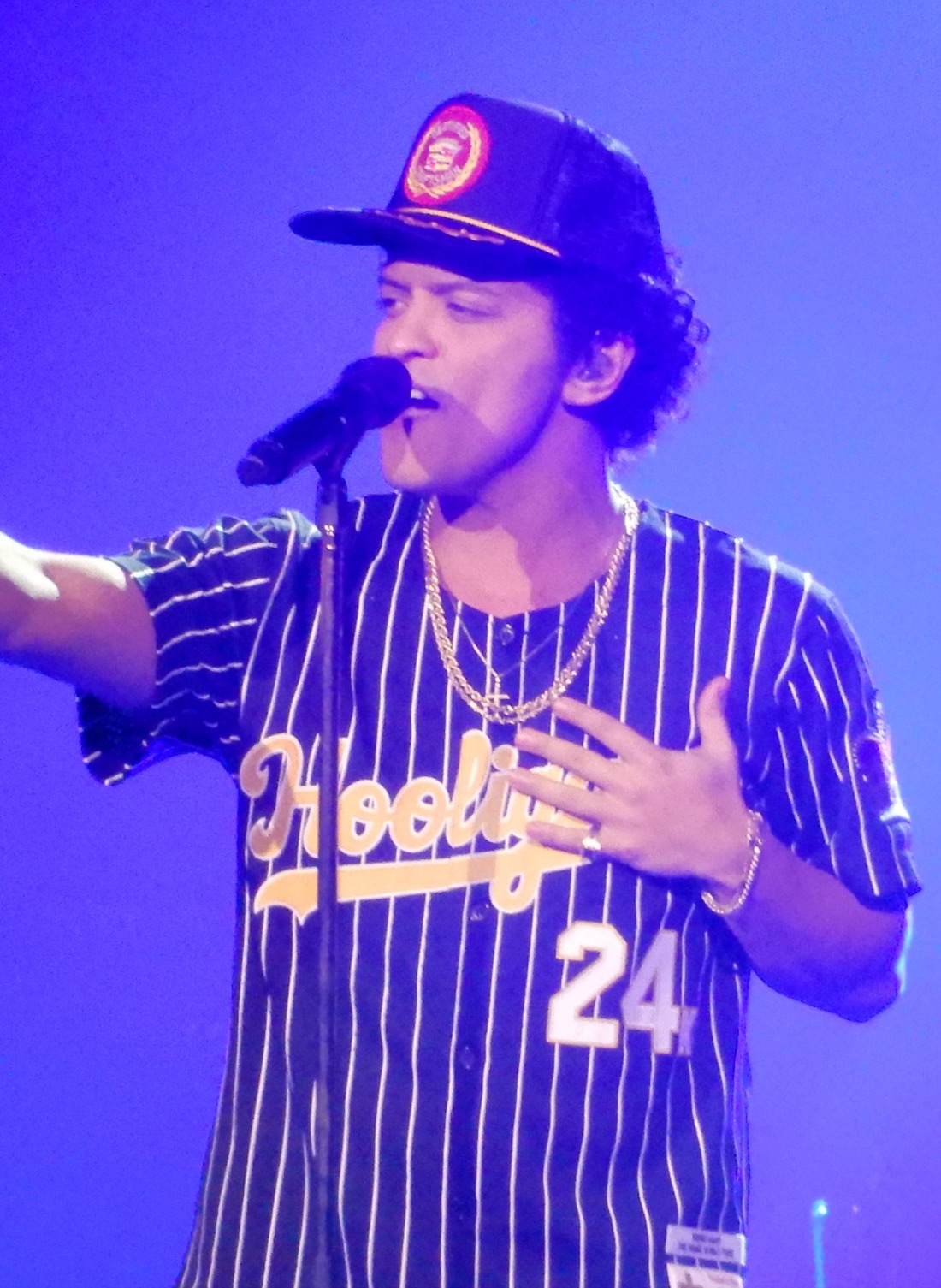
Bruno Mars

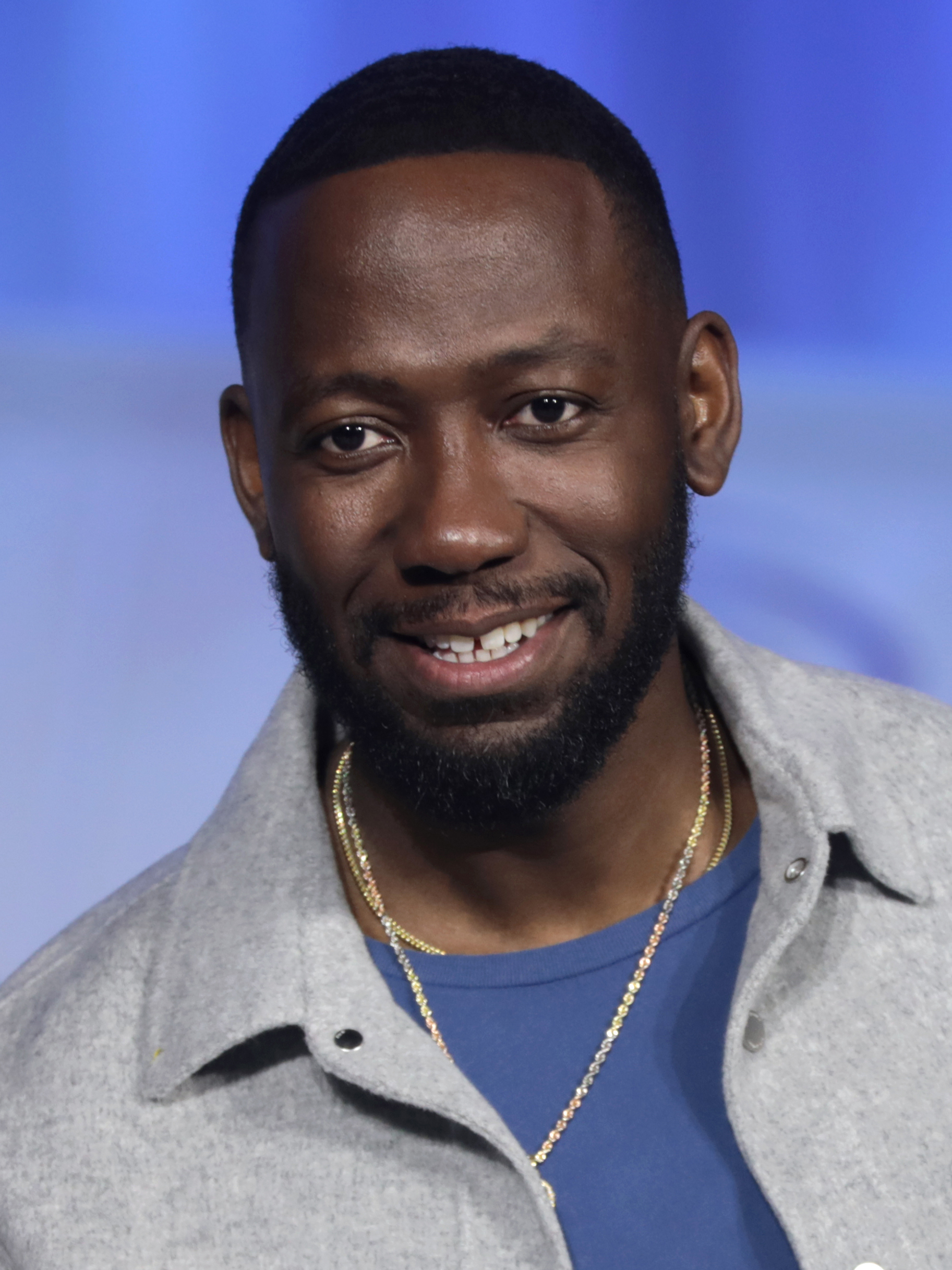
Lamorne Morris

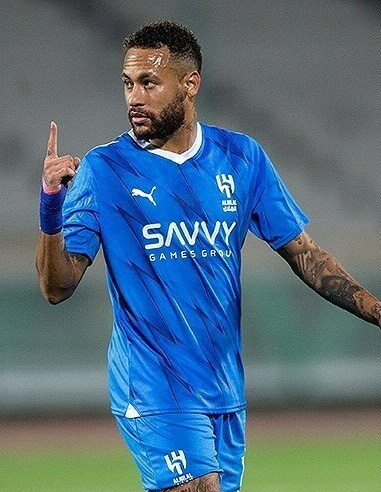
Neymar

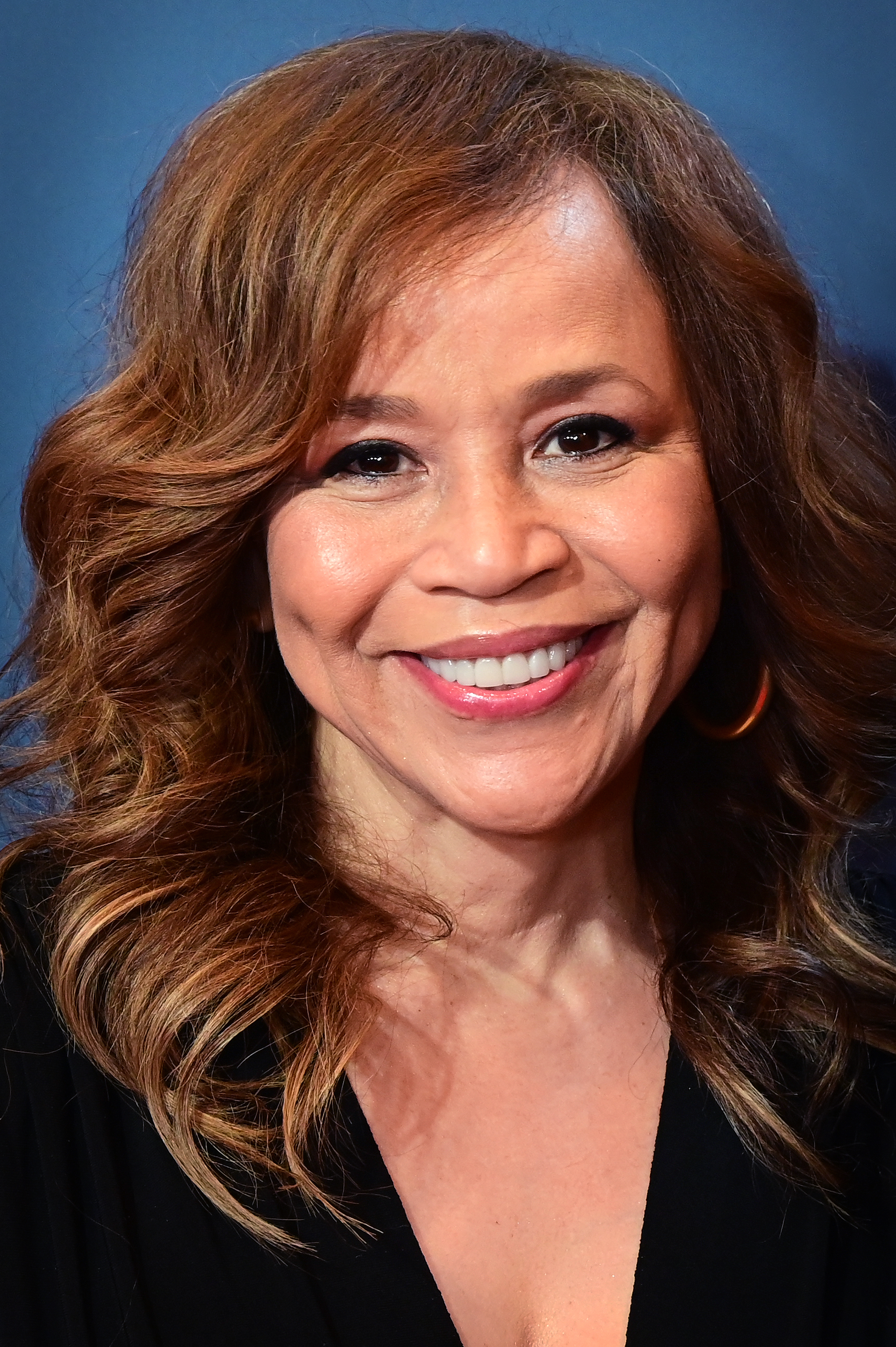
Rosie Perez

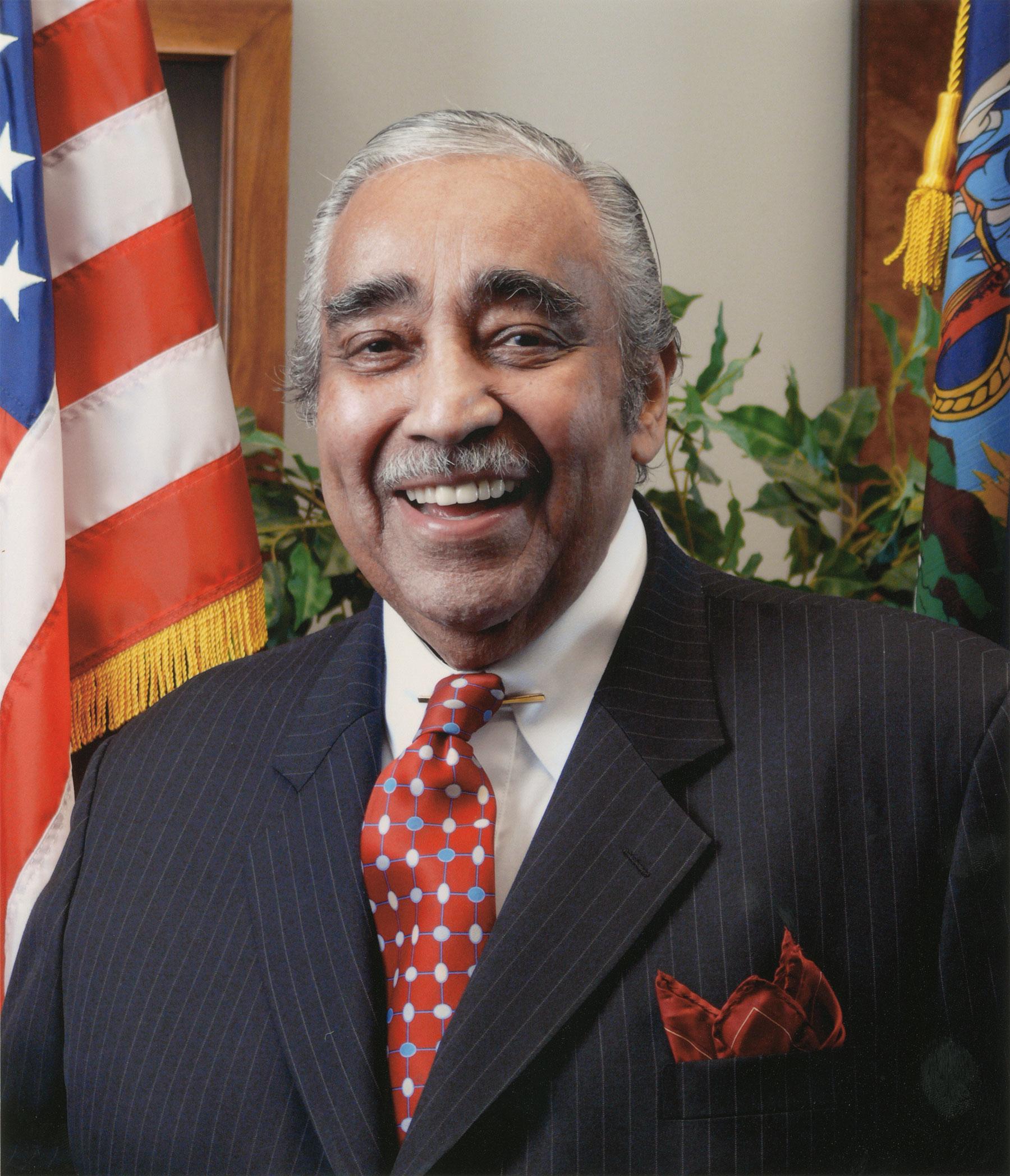
Charles Rangel

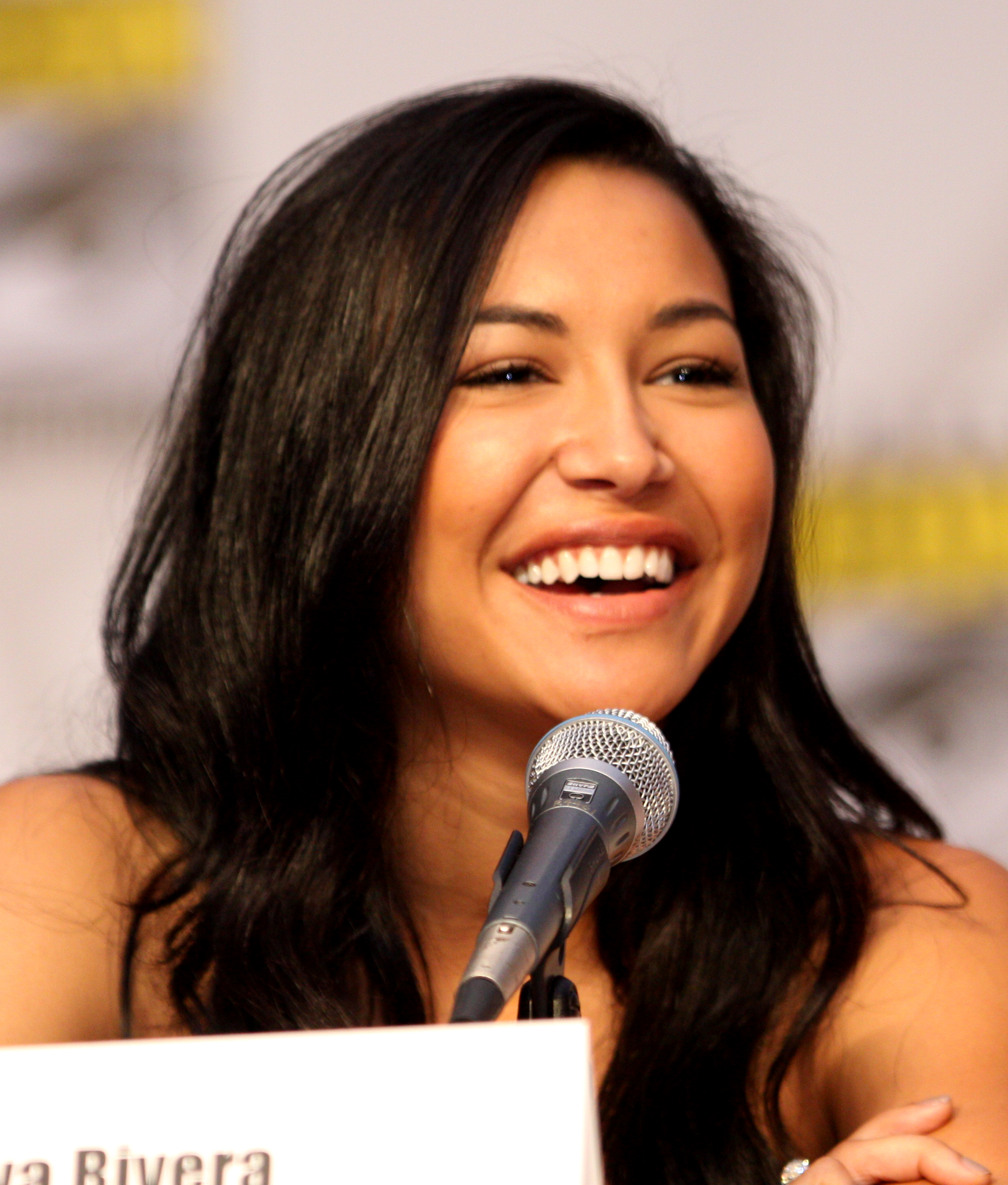
Naya Rivera

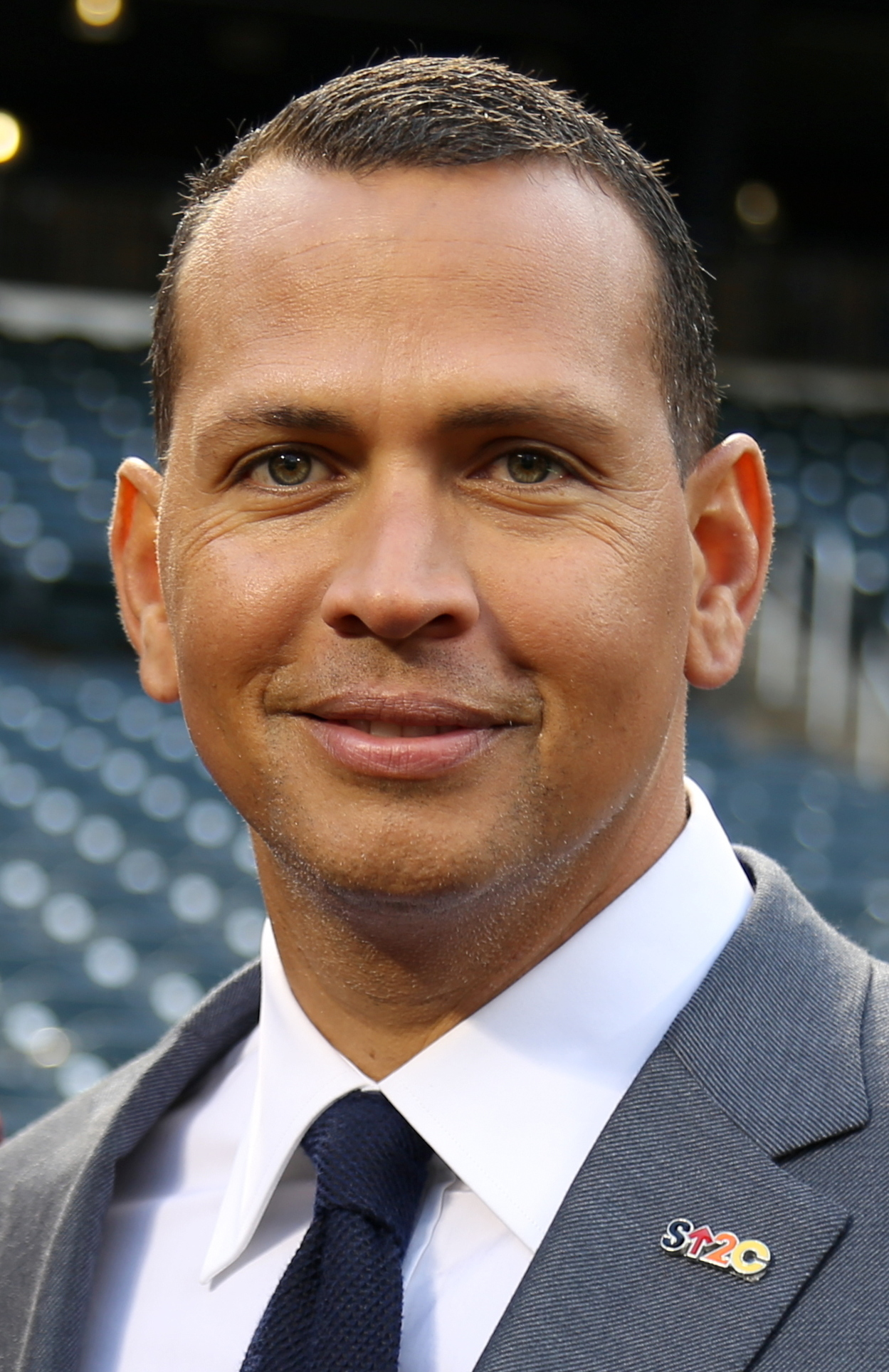
Alex Rodriguez

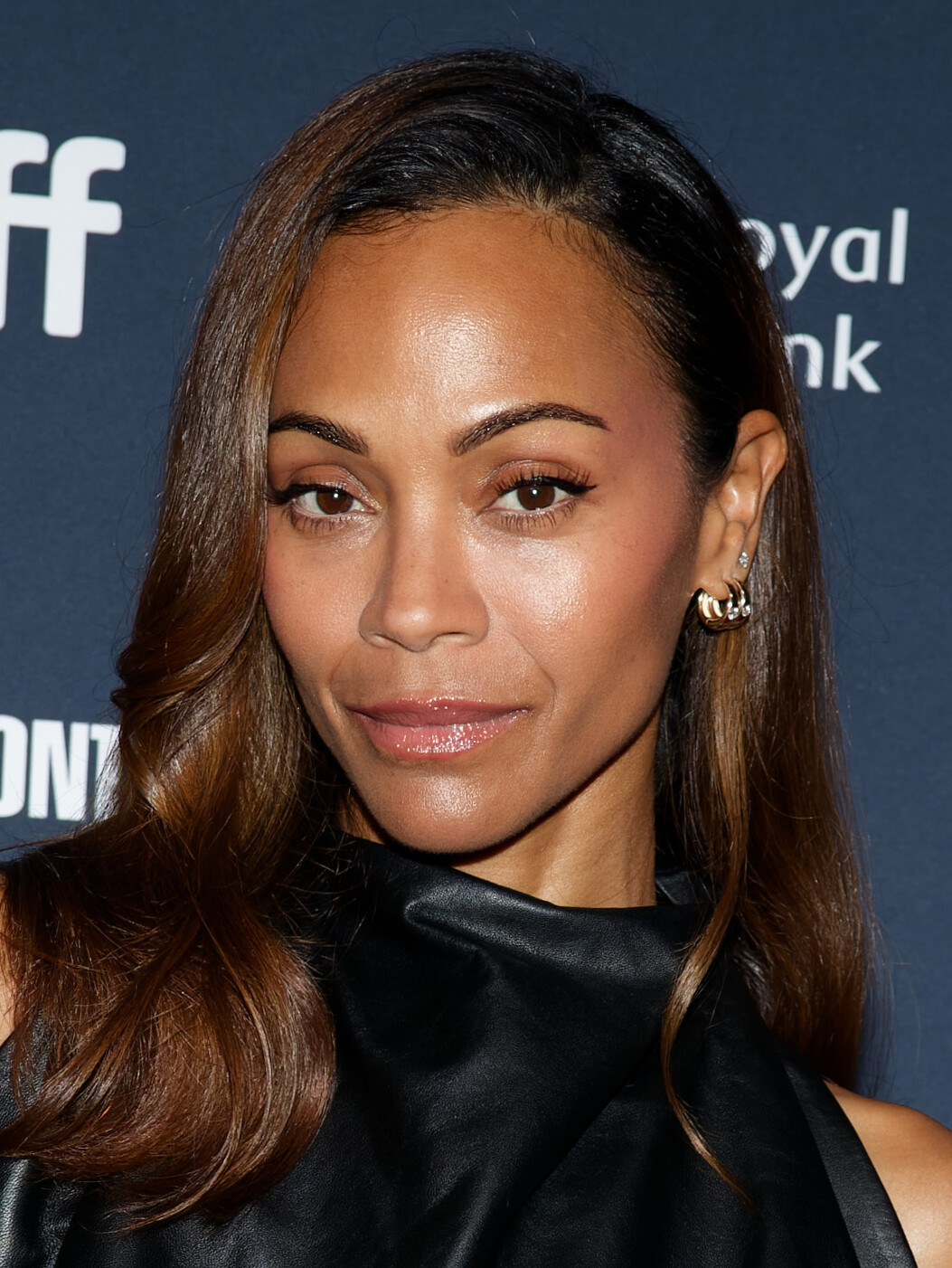
Zoe Saldaña

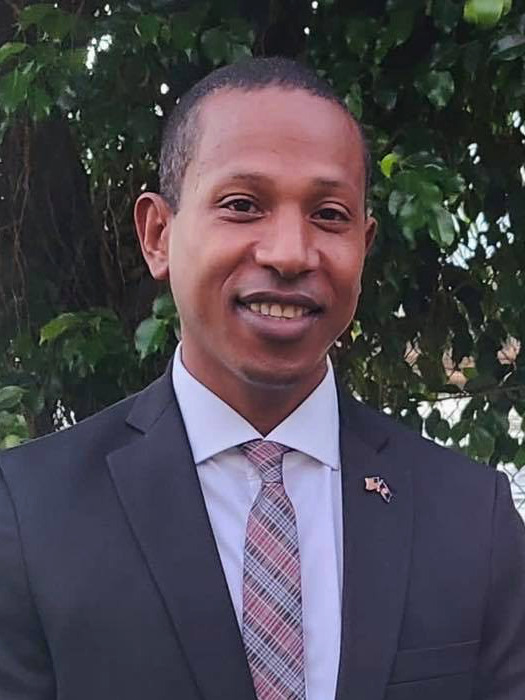
Shyne

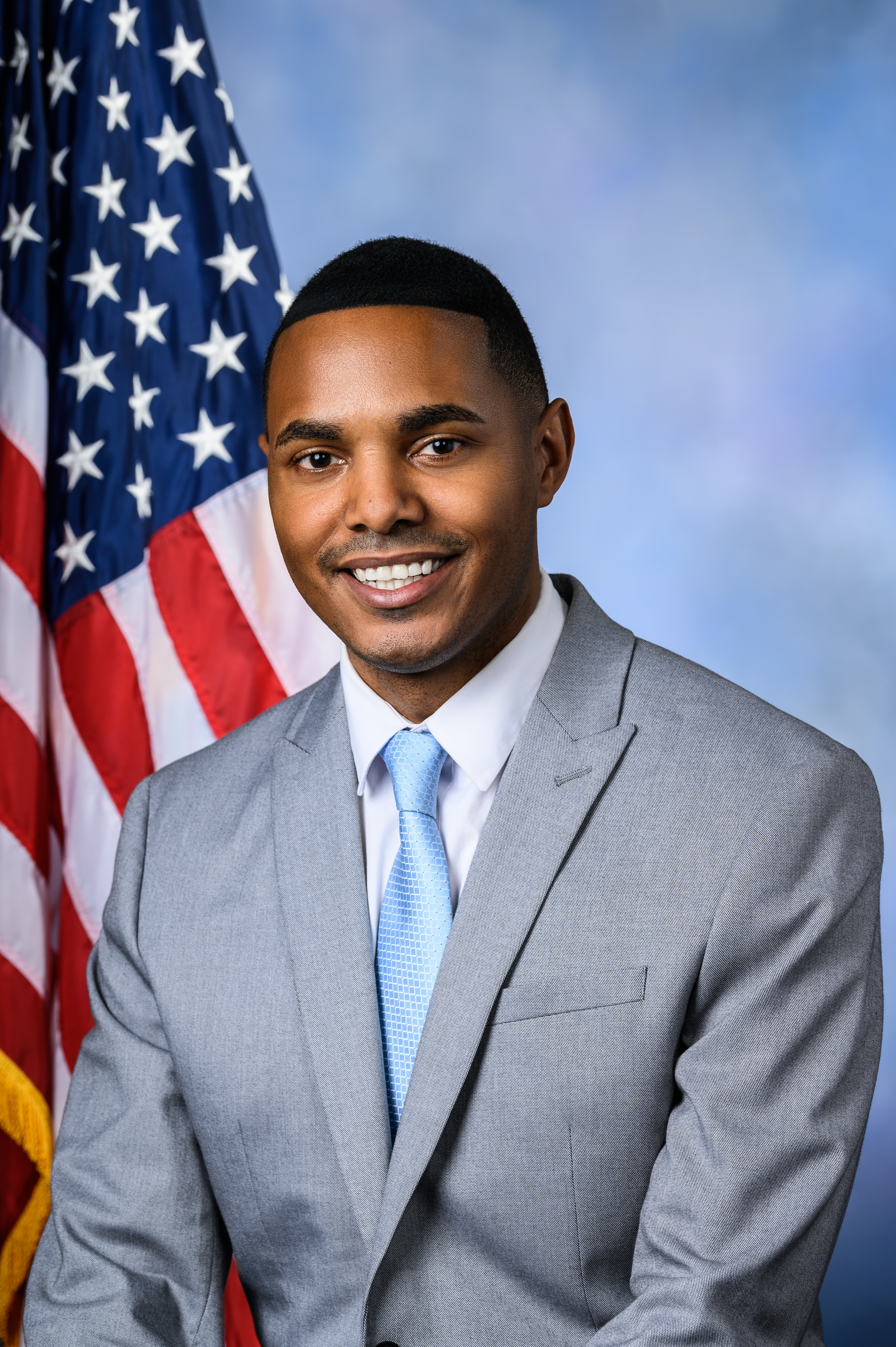
Ritchie Torres

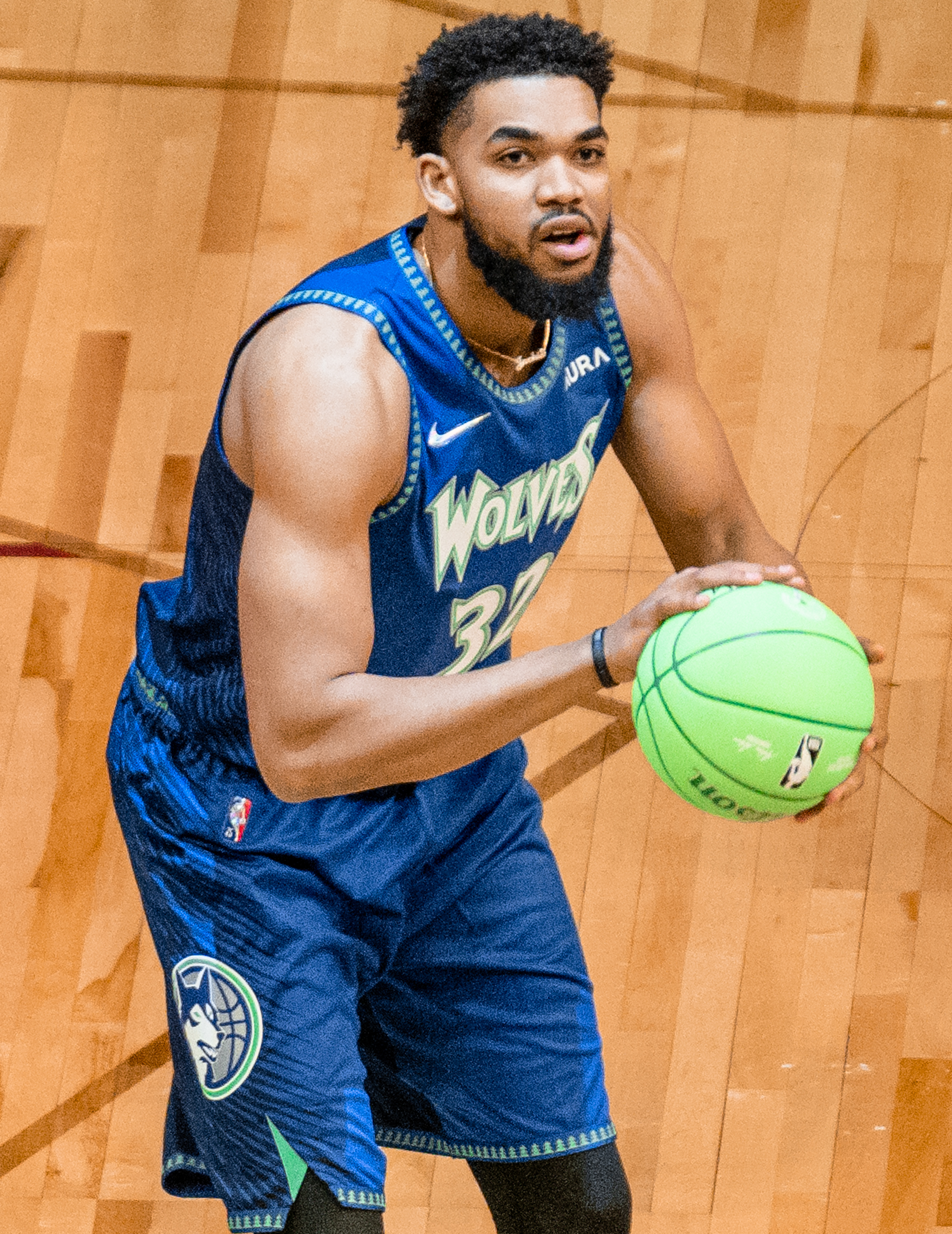
Karl-Anthony Towns

- Miguel Algarín – Puerto Rican poet, writer, and professor
- Roberto Alomar – Puerto Rican Major League Baseball Hall of Fame player, regarded highly as a second baseman
- Laz Alonso – Cuban-American film and television actor, best known for playing Tsu'tey in James Cameron-directed sci-fi film Avatar and Fenix Calderon in the film Fast & Furious
- Anitta – Brazilian singer, song-writer, and actress; half Afro-Brazilian
- La La Anthony – American former MTV VJ, television personality and actress, wife of former NBA basketball player Carmelo Anthony
- Taís Araújo – Brazilian actress, tv host, and model
- Karan Ashley – American actress, singer, and talk show host, best known for her role as Aisha (Yellow Ranger) on Mighty Morphin Power Rangers
- Eva Ayllón – Peruvian composer and singer
- AZ – American rapper
- Cardi B – American rapper
- Susana Baca – Peruvian singer-songwriter and ethnomusicologist
- Lloyd Banks – American rapper
- Jean-Michel Basquiat – American artist, musician
- Julissa Bermudez – American former BET television personality (106 & Park)
- Aloe Blacc – American singer-songwriter, rapper, and record producer
- David Blaine – American magician, mentalist, and endurance performer
- Karamo Brown – American television host, actor, and author
- Julia de Burgos – Puerto Rican poet, journalist, and activist for Puerto Rican independence
- Ursula Burns – American business executive
- Miguel Cabrera – Venezuelan Major League Baseball player
- Ilia Calderón – Colombian journalist
- Tego Calderón – Puerto Rican reggaeton singer-songwriter, rapper, and actor
- Francis Lewis Cardozo – American clergyman, politician, and educator; when elected Secretary of State of South Carolina in 1868, he was the first African American to hold a statewide office in the U.S.
- Mariah Carey – American musician, record producer, and actress; has won six Grammy Awards,19 World Music Awards, 10 American Music Awards, and 14 Billboard Music Awards
- John Carlos – American former sprinter, best known for his 1968 Olympics Black Power salute
- Matt Cedeño – American actor and former model
- Orlando Cepeda – former Puerto Rican Major League Baseball Hall of Fame player player
- Keshia Chanté – Canadian singer-songwriter, television host, and actress
- Aroldis Chapman – Cuban-born American Major League Baseball player
- Hugo Chávez – former Venezuelan President
- Roberto Clemente – former Puerto Rican Major League Baseball Hall of Fame player
- Ismael Cruz Córdova – Puerto Rican actor
- Kid Cudi – American rapper, record producer, and actor
- Celia Cruz – Cuban-American salsa singer and performer (1925-2003)
- Victor Cruz – American football player and former NFL wide receiver for the New York Giants
- Wilson Cruz – American actor
- Yaya DaCosta – American actress and model
- Stacey Dash – American actress
- Sammy Davis Jr. – American singer, actor, comedian, dancer, and musician; Grammy Lifetime Achievement Award; National Rhythm & Blues Hall of Fame.
- Rosario Dawson – American actress, musician, and activist
- Kristinia DeBarge – American singer-songwriter and actress
- Ariana DeBose – American singer and actress
- Melissa De Sousa – American actress
- Carlos Delgado – former Puerto Rican Major League Baseball player
- Kat DeLuna – American musician
- Rocsi Diaz – Honduras-born American model, actress, and former BET television personality (106 & Park)
- Samantha Diaz – American singer-songwriter; nicknamed "Just Sam" (American Idol)
- Daveed Diggs – American actor, rapper, and singer-songwriter
- Graciela Dixon – Panamanian, former Chief Justice of the Supreme Court of Panama
- Sheila E. – American percussionist, singer-songwriter, and actress
- Dave East – American rapper
- Dina Eastwood – American reporter and actress
- Arlen Escarpeta – Belizean-born American actor, best known for playing Sam Walker in the television drama American Dreams
- Adriano Espaillat – Dominican-American U.S. Congressman for NY; first Dominican-American, and first formerly undocumented immigrant, to serve in Congress
- Fabolous – American rapper
- Antonio Fargas – American actor
- Cheo Feliciano – Puerto Rican singer and composer of salsa and bolero music
- Leonel Fernández – former President of the Dominican Republic
- Tony Fernández – former Dominican Major League baseball player
- Dom Flemons – American musician and singer-songwriter
- Brian Flores – Honduran-American NFL defensive coordinator for the Minnesota Vikings; formerly Head Coach of the Miami Dolphins (2019-2021)
- Juan Flores – American historian, professor, Afro-Latino Studies scholar
- Arian Foster – American NFL football player, running back for the Houston Texans, musical artist
- Kevin Gates – American rapper and songwriter
- O. T. Genasis – American rapper
- Rónald Gómez – Costa Rican current Manager for CD Achuapa football club
- Meagan Good – American actress and model
- Herizen Guardiola – American actress and singer
- Gunplay – American rapper
- Severiano de Heredia – Cuban-born French politician, president of the municipal council of Paris from 1879 to 1880, first mayor of African descent of a Western world capital
- Al Horford – Dominican NBA basketball player; the son of NBA basketball player Tito Horford
- Quiara Alegría Hudes – American playwright, producer, lyricist and essayist; 2012 Pulitzer Prize for Drama for Water by the Spoonful
- Gwen Ifill – American journalist, television newscaster and author
- Iza – Brazilian pop singer-songwriter and dancer
- J.I. the Prince of NY – American rapper, singer, and songwriter
- Reggie Jackson – American Major League Baseball Hall of Fame player
- Shar Jackson – American actress, best known for her role as Niecy Jackson on the UPN sitcom Moesha
- Skai Jackson – American actress
- Jharrel Jerome – American actor, best known for his role in Moonlight
- Kalimba – Mexican singer and actor
- Kelis – American singer-songwriter
- Tori Kelly – American singer-songwriter
- Erick Kolthoff – Associate Justice of the Supreme Court of Puerto Rico
- Lisa "Left Eye" Lopes – American rapper and singer-songwriter; member of R&B girl group TLC (1971-2002)
- Amara La Negra – American singer, actress, dancer, author, and television host
- Jorge Lendeborg Jr. – American actor
- Selenis Leyva – American actress
- Adriana Lima – Brazilian model
- Lauren London – American actress
- Olivia Longott – American R&B singer
- Faizon Love – Cuban-born American actor and comedian
- La Lupe – Cuban singer of boleros, guarachas, and Latin soul
- Saoul Mamby – American boxer; World Boxing Council super lightweight champion
- EJ Manuel – NFL quarterback
- Juan Marichal – former Dominican Major League Baseball Hall of Fame pitcher
- Bruno Mars – American singer-songwriter, record producer, and dancer; 16 Grammy Awards, 14 American Music Awards, 5 Brit Awards, 14 Soul Train Music Awards, and 10 Guinness World Records
- Pedro Martínez – former Dominican Major League Baseball Hall of Fame pitcher
- Miguel – American singer-songwriter and record producer; specializes in contemporary and alternative R&B
- Christina Milian – American singer-songwriter, and actress
- Minnie Miñoso – former Cuban Major League Baseball Hall of Fame player; nicknamed "the Cuban Comet"
- Naima Mora – American fashion model (America's Next Top Model)
- Benny Moré – Cuban singer-songwriter and bandleader
- Lamorne Morris – American actor and comedian
- Rico Nasty – American rapper and singer
- Neymar – Brazilian footballer for Campeonato Brasileiro Série A club Santos, which he captains, and the Brazil national team
- N.O.R.E. – American rapper and podcaster
- Amaury Nolasco – Puerto Rican actor
- Lupita Nyong'o – Kenyan-Mexican actress
- Soledad O'Brien – American broadcast journalist, executive producer, and philanthropist
- Don Omar – Puerto Rican rapper, singer-songwriter, record producer, and actor
- Claudette Ortiz – American singer, model, and television personality (City High)
- David Ortiz – Dominican Major League Baseball Hall of Fame player
- Ozuna (real name is Juan Carlos Rosado) – Puerto Rican reggaeton and Latin trap singer
- Johnny Pacheco – Dominican musician, arranger, composer, bandleader, and record producer; founder of the Fania All-Stars; coined the term "Salsa"
- Peedi Peedi – American rapper
- Tony Peña – Dominican Major League Baseball player, manager, and coach
- Jacob "Princeton" Perez – American singer-songwriter, dancer, and actor (Mindless Behavior)
- Rosie Perez – American actress, dancer, choreographer, director and community activist
- Miguel Piñero – Puerto Rican playwright, poet, and actor; co-founder of the Nuyorican Poets Café
- Dascha Polanco – Dominican actress, best known for her role as Dana Diaz in the Netflix dramedy Orange is the New Black
- Reagan Gomez-Preston – American television, film, and voice actress
- Albert Pujols – Dominican-American Major League Baseball player; manager of the Estrellas Orientales of the Dominican Professional Baseball League
- Dania Ramirez – Dominican actress
- Manny Ramirez – Dominican Major League Baseball player
- Charles Rangel – former U.S. Congressman for New York
- Gina Ravera – American actress
- Judy Reyes – American actress, model, and producer
- Lais Ribeiro – Brazilian model
- Lauren Ridloff – American deaf actress
- Mychal Rivera – American NFL football player, tight end, Oakland Raiders
- Naya Rivera – American actress, best known for her role as Santana Lopez in the musical comedy Glee (1987-2020)
- Alex Rodriguez – Dominican-American Major League Baseball player; nicknamed "A-Rod"
- Samuel Rodriguez – American Evangelical Christian leader
- Sabi – American pop singer-songwriter, and dancer
- Zoe Saldaña – American actress; recipient of an Academy Award, a BAFTA Award, two Critics Choice Awards, a Golden Globe Award, a SAG Award, and a Cannes Film Festival Award.
- Manny Sanguillén – former Panamanian Major League Baseball player
- Juelz Santana – American rapper
- Antony Santos – Dominican bachata singer
- Romeo Santos – American singer-songwriter and record producer
- Jon Secada – Cuban-American singer
- Arturo Alfonso Schomburg – Puerto Rican historian, writer, and activist in the United States; founder of the Schomberg Center for Black Research
- Sech – Panamanian reggaeton artist and record producer
- Shyne – Belizean politician and former rapper
- Luis Guillermo Solís – Costa Rican president, political scientist, and historian; and mulatto
- Pop Smoke – American rapper of Afro-Panamanian descent (1999-2020)
- Sammy Sosa – former Dominican Major League Baseball player
- Esperanza Spalding – American bassist, singer-songwriter, and composer
- Jeremy Suarez – American former child actor
- Schoolboy Q – American rapper
- Cecilia Tait – Peruvian politician and former volleyball player; the first Afro-Peruvian elected to Peru's Congress
- Arnaldo Tamayo Méndez – Cuban military officer, legislator, and former cosmonaut
- Tessa Thompson – American actress
- Anuel AA – Puerto Rican reggaeton artist born to an Afro-Puerto Rican father and White Puerto Rican mother
- Melody Thornton – American singer-songwriter and dancer (The Pussycat Dolls)
- Luis Tiant – Cuban former MLB starting pitcher, Cleveland Indians and Boston Red Sox; nicknamed "El Tiante"
- Gina Torres – American actress
- Ritchie Torres – U.S. Congressman for New York; the first openly gay Afro-Latino elected to Congress
- Karl-Anthony Towns – Dominican-American basketball player for the New York Knicks of the NBA
- Toya – American R&B singer
- Trina – American rapper
- María Urrutia – Colombian politician and former weightlifter; won the first-ever gold medal for Colombia at the Summer Olympic Games
- Salvador Valdés Mesa – First Vice President of Cuba, former trade union leader, Political Bureau of the Communist Party of Cuba
- Amirah Vann – American actress and singer
- Danielle Vega – American actress
- Lauren Vélez – American actress
- Cassie Ventura – American singer, dancer, actress, and model
- Johnny Ventura – Dominican singer and band leader of merengue and salsa
- Fred Warner – American NFL football player for the San Francisco 49ers
- Tristan Wilds – American actor, singer-songwriter, and record producer
- Hype Williams – American music video and film director, film producer, and screenwriter
- Juan Williams – Panamanian-American journalist and political analyst
- DeAndre Yedlin – American soccer player who plays as a defender for Major League Soccer club Real Salt Lake and on the U.S. Men’s National Team
- Daddy Yankee – Puerto Rican reggaeton artist and pioneer in reggaeton music born to an Afro-Puerto Rican father and White Puerto Rican mother

== See also ==
- Lists of people:
  - List of Afro-Argentines
  - List of Afro-Bolivians
  - List of Brazilians of Black African descent
  - List of Afro-Cubans
  - List of Afro-Chileans
  - List of Afro-Colombians
  - List of Afro-Dominicans
  - List of Afro-Ecuadorians
  - List of Afro-Mexicans
  - List of Afro-Nicaraguans
  - List of Afro-Panamanians
  - List of Afro-Peruvians
  - List of Afro-Puerto Ricans
  - List of Afro-Uruguayans
  - List of Afro-Venezuelans
- Afro-Latin Americans
- African diaspora
- African diaspora in the Americas
- List of topics related to Black and African people
