= Franklin (footballer, born 1999) =

Brazilian footballer (born 1999)

Personal information
- Full name: Franklin Joseph Tochukwu Onwudiwe
- Date of birth: 23 February 1999 (age 27)
- Place of birth: São Paulo, Brazil
- Height: 1.83 m (6 ft 0 in)
- Position: Defender

Team information
- Current team: Paraná

Youth career
- –2018: Corinthians

Senior career*
Years	Team	Apps	(Gls)
2019	Lokomotiva	0	(0)
2020	Metta	24	(1)
2021	Panevėžys	2	(0)
2022–	Paraná	12	(0)
- * Club domestic league appearances and goals

Franklin Joseph Tochukwu Onwudiwe (born 23 February 1999) is a Brazilian professional footballer who plays as a defender for Paraná.

== Club career ==
Before the second half of 2018–19, Franklin signed for Croatian side Lokomotiva. Before the 2020 season, he signed for Metta in Latvia. Before the 2021 season, he signed for Lithuanian club Panevėžys. Before the 2022 season, Franklin signed for Paraná in Brazil. On 23 January 2022, he debuted for Paraná during a 1–0 loss to Athletico.

== Personal life ==
Born in Brazil, Franklin is of Nigerian descent through his father.
