= List of Brazilian films of 2022 =

This is a list of Brazilian films released in 2022.

== Films ==
Title	Director	Cast	Notes	Ref
Charcoal (Carvão)	Carolina Markowicz	César Bordón, Rômulo Braga, Jean de Almeida Costa, Maeve Jinkings, Camila Márdila		
Christmas Full of Grace (Um Natal Cheio de Graça)	Pedro Antonio	Sérgio Malheiros, Gessica Kayane, Vera Fischer, Leticia Isnard, Monique Alfradique, Leticia Isnard, Heitor Martínez, Diogo Defante, Valéria Vitoriano, Nando Cunha, Gabriel Louchard, Flávia Reis, Marianna Armellini, Cezar Maracujá, Noemia Oliveira, Valentina Vieira, Victor Meyniel		
Fever (Fiebre)	Elisa Eliash	Lautaro Cantillana Teke, Nora Catalano, Macarena Teke, Néstor Cantillana, José Soza, Tita Iacobelli, Agatha Simunovic, Luciano Jadrievich, Gabriel Urzua, Paula Zuñiga, Paula Bravo, Camilo Egaña	An international co-production with Chile and Peru Based on the 2017 short film Un poco de fiebre by Elisa Eliash	
Fogaréu	Flávia Neves	Bárbara Colen	Won Best Actress (Bárbara Colen) at 22nd Havana Film Festival New York	
My Big Big Friend - The Movie (Meu AmigãoZão - O Filme)	Andrés Lieban	Fernanda Ribeiro, Alice Lieban, Pablo Barros, Marcio Simões, Lina Mendes, Sérgio Stern, Bia Barros, Bruno Bonatto, Josy Bonfim, Guilherme Briggs, Anna Rita Cerqueira, Eduardo Drummond, Isadora Infante		
Pornomelancholia	Manuel Abramovich			
La Provisoria	Melina Fernández da Silva & Nicolás Meta	Andrés Ciavaglia, Ana Pauls, Juan Chapur, Sol Bordigoni, Nicolás Juárez, Albertina Vázquez	An international co-production with Argentina, Chile, Colombia & France	
Three Tidy Tigers Tied a Tie Tighter (Três tigres tristes)	Gustavo Vinagre			
Welcome to Quixeramobim (Bem-vinda a Quixeramobim)	Halder Gomes	Monique Alfradique, Max Petterson, Silvero Pereira, Edmilson Filho, Falcão		
Rule 34 (Regra 34)	Julia Murat	Sol Miranda, Lucas Andrade, Lorena Comparato, Isabela Mariotto		
