= Mestre do Sabor season 2 =

Mestre do Sabor
- Season 2
- Hosted by: Claude Troisgros; João Batista; Monique Alfradique
- Judges: José Avillez; Kátia Barbosa; Leo Paixão; Rafael Costa e Silva
- No. of contestants: 18
- Winner: Dário Costa

Release
- Original network: TV Globo; GNT
- Original release: April 30 – July 23, 2020

Season chronology
- ← Previous; Season 1 Next → Season 3

The second season of Mestre do Sabor premiered on Thursday, April 30, 2020, at 10:30 p.m. / 9:30 p.m. (BRT / AMT) on TV Globo.

Actress Monique Alfradique joined the show as a new co-host, replacing Maria Joana. In addition, the team sizes were reduced from eight to six.

Due to the COVID-19 pandemic, master José Avillez decided to left the show midway through filming of the season in order to travel to Lisbon, where he resides, to be quarantined with his family. As a result, he was replaced by Rafael Costa e Silva for the remaining of the season.

On March 12, 2020, TV Globo suspended all live audiences for their shows due to the pandemic in Brazil, shifting the season into a less-crowded production for its final weeks of shooting. Taping was completed on March 20, 2020.

On July 23, 2020, Dário Costa from Team Kátia won the competition over Ana Zambelli (Team Leo), Junior Marinho (Team Kátia) and Serginho Jucá (Team Leo), and took home the grand prize of R$250.000.

Dário previously competed on the first season of MasterChef Profissionais in 2016, but was eliminated in the semifinals, finishing in third place.

== Teams ==
Key
Winner
Runner-up
Eliminated

Masters	Top 18 contestants		
Rafael Costa e Silva José Avillez (episodes 1–4)			
Rafael Costa e Silva José Avillez (episodes 1–4)	Gi Nacarato	Kaywa Hilton	Caio Soter
Rafael Costa e Silva José Avillez (episodes 1–4)	Millena Barros	Claudia Krauspenhar	Mel Freitas
Kátia Barbosa			
Kátia Barbosa	Dário Costa	Junior Marinho	Francisco Pinheiro
Kátia Barbosa	Arthur Pendragon	Jackie Watanabe	Mari Schurt
Leo Paixão			
Leo Paixão	Ana Zambelli	Serginho Jucá	Lydia Gonzalez
Leo Paixão	Moacir Santana	Álvaro Gasparetto	Bruno Hoffmann

== Blind tests ==
Key

Master pressed the Green button
Master pressed the Red button
Contestant elected a master's team
Contestant defaulted to a master's team
Contestant eliminated with no master pressing their Green button

Episode	Contestant	Age	Hometown	Master's and contestant's choices		
Episode	Contestant	Age	Hometown	Avillez	Kátia	Leo
Episode 1 (April 30, 2020)
Episode 1 (April 30, 2020)	Millena Barros	31	Palmas			
Episode 1 (April 30, 2020)	Moacir Santana	27	Bauru			
Episode 1 (April 30, 2020)	Junior Marinho	29	Rio Branco			
Episode 1 (April 30, 2020)	Mari Schurt	27	Pato Branco			
Episode 1 (April 30, 2020)	Maristella Sodré	41	Niterói			
Episode 1 (April 30, 2020)	Kaywa Hilton	29	Salvador			
Episode 1 (April 30, 2020)	Francisco Pinheiro	46	São Paulo			
Episode 1 (April 30, 2020)	Lucius Galdenzi	40	Salvador			
Episode 1 (April 30, 2020)	Claudia Krauspenhar	41	Curitiba			
Episode 1 (April 30, 2020)	Álvaro Gasparetto	29	Mogi das Cruzes			
Episode 1 (April 30, 2020)	Lydia Gonzalez	35	Petrópolis			
Episode 2 (May 7, 2020)
Episode 2 (May 7, 2020)	Gi Nacarato	31	Ribeirão Preto			
Episode 2 (May 7, 2020)	Dário Costa	31	Guarujá			
Episode 2 (May 7, 2020)	Ana Zambelli	46	Rio de Janeiro			
Episode 2 (May 7, 2020)	William Oliveira	19	Belém			
Episode 2 (May 7, 2020)	Arthur Pendragon	30	Feira de Santana			
Episode 2 (May 7, 2020)	Mel Freitas	35	Jericoacoara			
Episode 2 (May 7, 2020)	Bruno Hoffmann	27	São Paulo			
Episode 2 (May 7, 2020)	Caio Soter	30	Belo Horizonte			
Episode 2 (May 7, 2020)	Naiara Kekes	31	Florianópolis	Team full		
Episode 2 (May 7, 2020)	Jackie Watanabe	31	Ilhabela	Team full		
Episode 2 (May 7, 2020)	Serginho Jucá	31	São Miguel dos Milagres	Team full	Team full	

== Pressure tests ==
Episode	Challenge winner(s)			Eliminated
Episode	Team immunity	Individual elimination		Eliminated
Episode	Claude's choice	Master's save	Masters' choice	Eliminated
Episode 3 (May 14, 2020)	Team Leo	Mari Schurt	Dário Costa	Mel Freitas
Episode 3 (May 14, 2020)	Team Leo	Kaywa Hilton	Dário Costa	Mel Freitas
Episode 4 (May 21, 2020)	Team Avillez	Jackie Watanabe	Dário Costa	Mari Schurt
Episode 4 (May 21, 2020)	Team Avillez	Lydia Gonzalez	Dário Costa	Mari Schurt
Episode 5 (May 28, 2020)	Team Leo	Gi Nacarato	Kaywa Hilton	Claudia Krauspenhar
Episode 5 (May 28, 2020)	Team Leo	Arthur Pendragon	Kaywa Hilton	Claudia Krauspenhar
Episode 6 (June 4, 2020)	Team Leo	Junior Marinho	Dário Costa	Jackie Watanabe
Episode 6 (June 4, 2020)	Team Leo	Millena Barros	Dário Costa	Jackie Watanabe
Episode 7 (June 11, 2020)	Team Leo	Gi Nacarato	Kaywa Hilton	Arthur Pendragon
Episode 7 (June 11, 2020)	Team Leo	Dário Costa	Kaywa Hilton	Millena Barros
Episode 8 (June 18, 2020)	Team Leo	None	Dário Costa	Caio Soter
Episode 8 (June 18, 2020)	Team Leo	None	Dário Costa	Kaywa Hilton

== The Duels ==
Key

Contestant won the Duel and advanced to the Quarterfinals
Contestant lost the Duel and went to compete in the Wildcard

Episode	Challenger		Challenged	
Episode	Master	Contestant	Contestant	Master
Episode 9 (June 25, 2020)	Leo Paixão	Lydia Gonzalez	Gi Nacarato	Rafael Costa e Silva
Episode 9 (June 25, 2020)	Kátia Barbosa	Junior Marinho	Álvaro Gasparetto	Leo Paixão
Episode 9 (June 25, 2020)	Leo Paixão	Ana Zambelli	Bruno Hoffmann	Leo Paixão
Episode 9 (June 25, 2020)	Leo Paixão	Moacir Santana	Dário Costa	Kátia Barbosa
Episode 9 (June 25, 2020)	Kátia Barbosa	Francisco Pinheiro	Serginho Jucá	Leo Paixão

== Wildcard ==
Key

Contestant won the Wildcard and advanced to the Quarterfinals
Contestant lost the Wildcard and was eliminated

Episode	Order	Master	Contestant	Result
Episode 10 (July 2, 2020)
Episode 10 (July 2, 2020)	1	Kátia Barbosa	Francisco Pinheiro	Advanced
Episode 10 (July 2, 2020)	2	Leo Paixão	Álvaro Gasparetto	Eliminated
Episode 10 (July 2, 2020)	3	Leo Paixão	Moacir Santana	Advanced
Episode 10 (July 2, 2020)	4	Leo Paixão	Bruno Hoffmann	Eliminated
Episode 10 (July 2, 2020)	5	Rafael Costa e Silva	Gi Nacarato	Advanced
Episode 10 (July 2, 2020)	1	Kátia Barbosa	Francisco Pinheiro	Eliminated
Episode 10 (July 2, 2020)	2	Rafael Costa e Silva	Gi Nacarato	Eliminated
Episode 10 (July 2, 2020)	3	Leo Paixão	Moacir Santana	Advanced

== Elimination chart ==
Key

- Winner
- Runner-up
- Chosen to advance
- Not chosen
- Immune from round 2
- Eliminated

	Week 1		Week 2		Week 3		
	Round 1	Round 2	Round 1	Round 2	Round 1	Round 2	Round 3
Dário Costa	Safe	Immune	Not Chosen	Safe	Round Winner	Round Winner	Winner (week 3)
Ana Zambelli	Not Chosen	Safe	Not Chosen	Safe	Not Chosen	Not Chosen	Runner-up (week 3)
Junior Marinho	Safe	Immune	Safe	Immune	Not Chosen	Not Chosen	Runner-up (week 3)
Serginho Jucá	Not Chosen	Safe	Safe	Immune	Not Chosen	Not Chosen	Runner-up (week 3)
Lydia Gonzalez	Safe	Immune	Not Chosen	Eliminated	Eliminated (week 2)		
Moacir Santana	Not Chosen	Eliminated	Eliminated (week 1)				

=== Week 1: Quarterfinals ===
Episode	Order	Master	Contestant	Result
Episode 11 (July 9, 2020)
Episode 11 (July 9, 2020)	1	Leo Paixão	Serginho Jucá	Not Chosen
Episode 11 (July 9, 2020)	2	Kátia Barbosa	Junior Marinho	Safe
Episode 11 (July 9, 2020)	3	Leo Paixão	Lydia Gonzalez	Safe
Episode 11 (July 9, 2020)	4	Kátia Barbosa	Dário Costa	Safe
Episode 11 (July 9, 2020)	5	Leo Paixão	Moacir Santana	Not Chosen
Episode 11 (July 9, 2020)	6	Leo Paixão	Ana Zambelli	Not Chosen
Episode 11 (July 9, 2020)	1	Leo Paixão	Ana Zambelli	Safe
Episode 11 (July 9, 2020)	2	Leo Paixão	Serginho Jucá	Safe
Episode 11 (July 9, 2020)	3	Leo Paixão	Moacir Santana	Eliminated

=== Week 2: Semifinals ===
Episode	Order	Master	Contestant	Result
Episode 12 (July 16, 2020)
Episode 12 (July 16, 2020)	1	Kátia Barbosa	Dário Costa	Not Chosen
Episode 12 (July 16, 2020)	2	Leo Paixão	Ana Zambelli	Not Chosen
Episode 12 (July 16, 2020)	3	Kátia Barbosa	Junior Marinho	Safe
Episode 12 (July 16, 2020)	4	Leo Paixão	Lydia Gonzalez	Not Chosen
Episode 12 (July 16, 2020)	5	Leo Paixão	Serginho Jucá	Safe
Episode 12 (July 16, 2020)	1	Leo Paixão	Ana Zambelli	Safe
Episode 12 (July 16, 2020)	2	Kátia Barbosa	Dário Costa	Safe
Episode 12 (July 16, 2020)	3	Leo Paixão	Lydia Gonzalez	Eliminated

=== Week 3: Finals ===
Episode	Order	Master	Contestant	Result
Episode 13 (July 23, 2020)
Episode 13 (July 23, 2020)	1	Leo Paixão	Serginho Jucá	Not Chosen
Episode 13 (July 23, 2020)	2	Leo Paixão	Ana Zambelli	Not Chosen
Episode 13 (July 23, 2020)	3	Kátia Barbosa	Dário Costa	Round Winner
Episode 13 (July 23, 2020)	4	Kátia Barbosa	Junior Marinho	Not Chosen
Episode 13 (July 23, 2020)	1	Kátia Barbosa	Junior Marinho	Not Chosen
Episode 13 (July 23, 2020)	2	Kátia Barbosa	Dário Costa	Round Winner
Episode 13 (July 23, 2020)	3	Leo Paixão	Serginho Jucá	Not Chosen
Episode 13 (July 23, 2020)	4	Leo Paixão	Ana Zambelli	Not Chosen
Episode 13 (July 23, 2020)	1	Leo Paixão	Serginho Jucá	Runner-up
Episode 13 (July 23, 2020)	2	Leo Paixão	Ana Zambelli	Runner-up
Episode 13 (July 23, 2020)	3	Kátia Barbosa	Junior Marinho	Runner-up
Episode 13 (July 23, 2020)	4	Kátia Barbosa	Dário Costa	Winner

== Ratings and reception ==
=== Brazilian ratings ===
All numbers are in points and provided by Kantar Ibope Media.

Episode	Title	Air date	Timeslot (BRT)	SP viewers (in points)	Source
1	The Blind Tests 1	April 30, 2020	Thursday 10:30 p.m.	16.3	
2	The Blind Tests 2	May 7, 2020	Thursday 10:30 p.m.	16.7	
3	The Pressure Tests 1	May 14, 2020	Thursday 10:30 p.m.	18.2	
4	The Pressure Tests 2	May 21, 2020	Thursday 10:30 p.m.	16.1	
5	The Pressure Tests 3	May 28, 2020	Thursday 10:30 p.m.	18.0	
6	The Pressure Tests 4	June 4, 2020	Thursday 10:30 p.m.	18.4	
7	The Pressure Tests 5	June 11, 2020	Thursday 10:30 p.m.	17.5	
8	The Pressure Tests 6	June 18, 2020	Thursday 10:30 p.m.	18.4	
9	The Duels	June 25, 2020	Thursday 10:30 p.m.	17.9	
10	Wildcard	July 2, 2020	Thursday 10:30 p.m.	19.5	
11	Quarterfinals	July 9, 2020	Thursday 10:30 p.m.	19.2	
12	Semifinals	July 16, 2020	Thursday 10:30 p.m.	20.3	
13	Finals	July 23, 2020	Thursday 10:30 p.m.	19.8	

- In 2020, each point represents 260.558 households in 15 market cities in Brazil (74.987 households in São Paulo).
