= Mestre do Sabor season 1 =

Mestre do Sabor
- Season 1
- Hosted by: Claude Troisgros; João Batista; Maria Joana (online)
- Judges: José Avillez; Kátia Barbosa; Leo Paixão
- No. of contestants: 24
- Winner: Gabriel Coelho

Release
- Original network: Rede Globo; GNT
- Original release: October 10 – December 26, 2019

Season chronology
- Next → Season 2

The first season of Mestre do Sabor premiered on Thursday, October 10, 2019, at 10:30 p.m. / 9:30 p.m. (BRT / AMT) on Rede Globo. The season generally received bad reviews from critics and its ratings were below average Rede Globo's expectations.

On December 26, 2019, Gabriel Coelho from Team Avillez won the competition over Dudu Poerner from Team Leo, and the grand prize of R$250.000 and a brand new car.

== Teams ==
Key
Winner
Runner-up
Eliminated

Masters	Top 24 contestants			
José Avillez				
José Avillez	Gabriel Coelho	Djalma Victor	Lui Veronese	Janete Borges
José Avillez	Ana Bueno	Gustavo Young	Thiago das Chagas	Rafael Lorenti
Kátia Barbosa				
Kátia Barbosa	Amanda Grezzana	Lira Müller	Carol Albuquerque	Marcelo Cotrim
Kátia Barbosa	Fernando Vaz	Felipe Oliveira	Seichele Barboza	Lili Almeida
Leo Paixão				
Leo Paixão	Dudu Poerner	Viviane Almeida	André Barros	Raissa Ribeiro
Leo Paixão	Ricardo Caldas	Diego Gimenez	Roberto Neves	Mariana Pelozio

== Blind tests ==
Key

Master pressed the Green button
Master pressed the Red button
Contestant elected a master's team
Contestant defaulted to a master's team
Contestant eliminated with no master pressing their Green button

Episode	Contestant	Age	Hometown	Master's and contestant's choices		
Episode	Contestant	Age	Hometown	Avillez	Kátia	Leo
Episode 1 (October 10, 2019)
Episode 1 (October 10, 2019)	Lili Almeida	38	Salvador			
Episode 1 (October 10, 2019)	André Barros	51	Rio Verde			
Episode 1 (October 10, 2019)	Pedro Coronha	22	Rio de Janeiro			
Episode 1 (October 10, 2019)	Seichele Barboza	28	Aracaju			
Episode 1 (October 10, 2019)	Djalma Vitor	34	Sete Lagoas			
Episode 1 (October 10, 2019)	William Chen Yen	48	Brasília			
Episode 1 (October 10, 2019)	Diego Gimenez	31	São Paulo			
Episode 1 (October 10, 2019)	Gustavo Young	36	São Paulo			
Episode 1 (October 10, 2019)	Carol Albuquerque	38	Porto Alegre			
Episode 2 (October 17, 2019)	Gabriel Coelho	31	São Paulo			
Episode 2 (October 17, 2019)	Lira Müller	31	Teresina			
Episode 2 (October 17, 2019)	Dudu Poerner	27	Florianópolis			
Episode 2 (October 17, 2019)	Lui Veronese	31	Brasília			
Episode 2 (October 17, 2019)	Roberto Neves	31	Belém			
Episode 2 (October 17, 2019)	Ana Bueno	48	Paraty			
Episode 2 (October 17, 2019)	Viviane Almeida	22	Belo Horizonte			
Episode 2 (October 17, 2019)	Cathy Xavier	34	São Luís			
Episode 2 (October 17, 2019)	Rafael Lorenti	30	São Paulo			
Episode 2 (October 17, 2019)	Felipe Oliveira	34	Belo Horizonte			
Episode 3 (October 24, 2019)
Episode 3 (October 24, 2019)	Ricardo Caldas	47	Florianópolis			
Episode 3 (October 24, 2019)	Amanda Grezzana	33	Caxias do Sul			
Episode 3 (October 24, 2019)	Raissa Ribeiro	25	São Paulo			
Episode 3 (October 24, 2019)	Janete Borges	41	Florianópolis			
Episode 3 (October 24, 2019)	Marcelo Cotrim	35	Cuiabá			
Episode 3 (October 24, 2019)	Danielle Santos	35	São João de Meriti			
Episode 3 (October 24, 2019)	Thiago das Chagas	36	Recife			
Episode 3 (October 24, 2019)	Fernando Vaz	39	Rio de Janeiro	Team full		
Episode 3 (October 24, 2019)	Mariana Pelozio	33	São Paulo	Team full	Team full	

== Pressure tests ==
Episode	Challenge winner(s)			Eliminated
Episode	Team immunity	Individual elimination		Eliminated
Episode	Claude's choice	Master's save	Masters' choice	Eliminated
Episode 4 (October 31, 2019)	Team Avillez	Lira Müller	Marcelo Cotrim	Mariana Pelozio
Episode 4 (October 31, 2019)	Team Avillez	Amanda Grezzana	Marcelo Cotrim	Mariana Pelozio
Episode 4 (October 31, 2019)	Team Avillez	Raissa Ribeiro	Dudu Poerner	Roberto Neves
Episode 4 (October 31, 2019)	Team Avillez	Diego Gimenez	Dudu Poerner	Roberto Neves
Episode 5 (November 7, 2019)	Team Avillez	Carol Albuquerque	Amanda Grezzana	Lili Almeida
Episode 5 (November 7, 2019)	Team Avillez	Felipe Oliveira	Amanda Grezzana	Lili Almeida
Episode 5 (November 7, 2019)	Team Avillez	Dudu Poerner	Ricardo Caldas	Diego Gimenez
Episode 5 (November 7, 2019)	Team Avillez	Raissa Ribeiro	Ricardo Caldas	Diego Gimenez
Episode 6 (November 14, 2019)	Team Leo	Lira Müller	Djalma Victor	Rafael Lorenti
Episode 6 (November 14, 2019)	Team Leo	Marcelo Cotrim	Djalma Victor	Rafael Lorenti
Episode 6 (November 14, 2019)	Team Leo	Amanda Grezzana	Djalma Victor	Rafael Lorenti
Episode 6 (November 14, 2019)	Team Leo	Gabriel Coelho	Felipe Oliveira	Thiago das Chagas
Episode 6 (November 14, 2019)	Team Leo	Ana Bueno	Felipe Oliveira	Thiago das Chagas
Episode 6 (November 14, 2019)	Team Leo	Gustavo Young	Felipe Oliveira	Thiago das Chagas
Episode 7 (November 21, 2019)	Team Avillez	Fernando Vaz	Dudu Poerner	Seichele Barboza
Episode 7 (November 21, 2019)	Team Avillez	Carol Albuquerque	Dudu Poerner	Seichele Barboza
Episode 7 (November 21, 2019)	Team Avillez	André Barros	Raissa Ribeiro	Ricardo Caldas
Episode 7 (November 21, 2019)	Team Avillez	Viviane Almeida	Raissa Ribeiro	Ricardo Caldas

== The Duels ==
Key

Contestant won the Duel and advanced to the Quarterfinals
Contestant lost the Duel and was eliminated

Episode	Challenger		Challenged	
Episode	Master	Contestant	Contestant	Master
Episode 8 (November 28, 2019)	José Avillez	Gustavo Young	Lira Müller	Kátia Barbosa
Episode 8 (November 28, 2019)	José Avillez	Ana Bueno	Lui Veronese	José Avillez
Episode 8 (November 28, 2019)	José Avillez	Djalma Victor	Fernando Vaz	Kátia Barbosa
Episode 8 (November 28, 2019)	Kátia Barbosa	Amanda Grezzana	Felipe Oliveira	Kátia Barbosa
Episode 9 (December 5, 2019)	José Avillez	Gabriel Coelho	Raissa Ribeiro	Leo Paixão
Episode 9 (December 5, 2019)	Kátia Barbosa	Carol Albuquerque	André Barros	Leo Paixão
Episode 9 (December 5, 2019)	Leo Paixão	Dudu Poerner	Vivi Almeida	Leo Paixão
Episode 9 (December 5, 2019)	Kátia Barbosa	Marcelo Cotrim	Janete Borges	José Avillez

== Elimination chart ==
Key

- Winner
- Runner-up
- Chosen to advance
- Not chosen
- Immune from round 2
- Eliminated

	Week 1		Week 2		Week 3	
	Round 1	Round 2	Round 1	Round 2	Round 1	Round 2
Gabriel Coelho	Safe	Immune	Not Chosen	Safe	Safe	Winner (week 3)
Dudu Poerner	Not Chosen	Safe	Not Chosen	Safe	Safe	Runner-up (week 3)
Djalma Victor	Safe	Immune	Safe	Immune	Eliminated	Eliminated (week 3)
Lui Veronese	Not Chosen	Safe	Safe	Immune	Eliminated	Eliminated (week 3)
Amanda Grezzana	Safe	Immune	Not Chosen	Eliminated	Eliminated (week 2)	
Lira Müller	Not Chosen	Safe	Not Chosen	Eliminated	Eliminated (week 2)	
Carol Albuquerque	Not Chosen	Eliminated	Eliminated (week 1)			
Janete Borges	Not Chosen	Eliminated	Eliminated (week 1)			

=== Week 1: Quarterfinals ===
Episode	Order	Master	Contestant	Result
Episode 10 (December 12, 2019)
Episode 10 (December 12, 2019)	1	José Avillez	Lui Veronese	Not Chosen
Episode 10 (December 12, 2019)	2	Kátia Barbosa	Carol Albuquerque	Not Chosen
Episode 10 (December 12, 2019)	3	José Avillez	Djalma Victor	Safe
Episode 10 (December 12, 2019)	4	José Avillez	Gabriel Coelho	Safe
Episode 10 (December 12, 2019)	5	Leo Paixão	Dudu Poerner	Not Chosen
Episode 10 (December 12, 2019)	6	Kátia Barbosa	Lira Müller	Not Chosen
Episode 10 (December 12, 2019)	7	Kátia Barbosa	Amanda Grezzana	Safe
Episode 10 (December 12, 2019)	8	José Avillez	Janete Borges	Not Chosen
Episode 10 (December 12, 2019)	1	José Avillez	Lui Veronese	Safe
Episode 10 (December 12, 2019)	2	Kátia Barbosa	Lira Müller	Safe
Episode 10 (December 12, 2019)	3	José Avillez	Janete Borges	Eliminated
Episode 10 (December 12, 2019)	4	Leo Paixão	Dudu Poerner	Safe
Episode 10 (December 12, 2019)	5	Kátia Barbosa	Carol Albuquerque	Eliminated

=== Week 2: Semifinals ===
Episode	Order	Master	Contestant	Result
Episode 11 (December 19, 2019)
Episode 11 (December 19, 2019)	1	José Avillez	Djalma Victor	Safe
Episode 11 (December 19, 2019)	2	Kátia Barbosa	Lira Müller	Not Chosen
Episode 11 (December 19, 2019)	3	Kátia Barbosa	Amanda Grezzana	Not Chosen
Episode 11 (December 19, 2019)	4	José Avillez	Lui Veronese	Safe
Episode 11 (December 19, 2019)	5	José Avillez	Gabriel Coelho	Not Chosen
Episode 11 (December 19, 2019)	6	Leo Paixão	Dudu Poerner	Not Chosen
Episode 11 (December 19, 2019)	1	Kátia Barbosa	Amanda Grezzana	Eliminated
Episode 11 (December 19, 2019)	2	José Avillez	Gabriel Coelho	Safe
Episode 11 (December 19, 2019)	3	Leo Paixão	Dudu Poerner	Safe
Episode 11 (December 19, 2019)	4	Kátia Barbosa	Lira Müller	Eliminated

=== Week 3: Finals ===
Episode	Order	Master	Contestant	Result
Episode 12 (December 26, 2019)
Episode 12 (December 26, 2019)	1	José Avillez	Djalma Victor	Eliminated
Episode 12 (December 26, 2019)	2	José Avillez	Gabriel Coelho	Safe
Episode 12 (December 26, 2019)	3	Leo Paixão	Dudu Poerner	Safe
Episode 12 (December 26, 2019)	4	José Avillez	Lui Veronese	Eliminated
Episode 12 (December 26, 2019)	1	José Avillez	Gabriel Coelho	Winner
Episode 12 (December 26, 2019)	2	Leo Paixão	Dudu Poerner	Runner-up

== Ratings and reception ==
=== Brazilian ratings ===
All numbers are in points and provided by Kantar Ibope Media.

Episode	Title	Air date	Timeslot (BRT)	SP viewers (in points)	Source
1	The Blind Tests 1	October 10, 2019	Thursday 10:30 p.m.	18.7	
2	The Blind Tests 2	October 17, 2019	Thursday 10:30 p.m.	18.5	
3	The Blind Tests 3	October 24, 2019	Thursday 10:30 p.m.	19.1	
4	The Pressure Tests 1	October 31, 2019	Thursday 10:30 p.m.	20.2	
5	The Pressure Tests 2	November 7, 2019	Thursday 10:30 p.m.	19.2	
6	The Pressure Tests 3	November 14, 2019	Thursday 10:30 p.m.	17.0	
7	The Pressure Tests 4	November 21, 2019	Thursday 10:30 p.m.	19.0	
8	The Duels 1	November 28, 2019	Thursday 10:30 p.m.	15.0	
9	The Duels 2	December 5, 2019	Thursday 10:30 p.m.	15.0	
10	Quarterfinals	December 12, 2019	Thursday 10:30 p.m.	14.8	
11	Semifinals	December 19, 2019	Thursday 10:30 p.m.	18.4	
12	Finals	December 26, 2019	Thursday 10:30 p.m.	17.7	

- In 2019, each point represents 254.892 households in 15 market cities in Brazil (73.015 households in São Paulo).
