= Mestre do Sabor season 3 =

Mestre do Sabor
- Season 3
- Hosted by: Claude Troisgros; João Batista; Monique Alfradique
- Judges: Kátia Barbosa; Leo Paixão; Rafael Costa e Silva
- No. of contestants: 18
- Winner: Rodrigo Guimarães

Release
- Original network: TV Globo; GNT
- Original release: May 6 – July 22, 2021

Season chronology
- ← Previous; Season 2

The third season of Mestre do Sabor premiered on Thursday, May 6, 2021, at 10:30 p.m. / 9:30 p.m. (BRT / AMT) on TV Globo.

== Teams ==
Key
Winner
Runner-up
Eliminated

Masters	Top 18 contestants		
Kátia Barbosa			
Kátia Barbosa	Vitória Gasques	Bia Pimentel	Pedro Franco
Kátia Barbosa	Matheus Almeida	Léo Modesto	Ana Gabriela Costa
Leo Paixão			
Leo Paixão	Pedro Barbosa	Cadu Moura	Carol Francelino
Leo Paixão	Bruna Martins	Aline Guedes	Rafa Campos
Rafael Costa e Silva			
Rafael Costa e Silva	Rodrigo Guimarães	Danilo Takigawa	Diogo Sabião
Rafael Costa e Silva	Ana Carolina Garcia	Ju Lima	Leninha Carvalho

== Blind tests ==
Key

Master pressed the Green button
Master pressed the Red button
Contestant elected a master's team
Contestant defaulted to a master's team
Contestant eliminated with no master pressing their Green button

Episode	Contestant	Age	Hometown	Master's and contestant's choices		
Episode	Contestant	Age	Hometown	Kátia	Leo	Rafa
Episode 1 (May 6, 2021)
Episode 1 (May 6, 2021)	Léo Modesto	34	Cametá			
Episode 1 (May 6, 2021)	Bruna Martins	31	Belo Horizonte			
Episode 1 (May 6, 2021)	Rodrigo Guimarães	36	Rio de Janeiro			
Episode 1 (May 6, 2021)	Aline Guedes	36	São Paulo			
Episode 1 (May 6, 2021)	Bia Pimentel	37	Itupiranga			
Episode 1 (May 6, 2021)	Marcelo de Sousa		Rio de Janeiro			
Episode 1 (May 6, 2021)	Leninha Carvalho	51	Brasília			
Episode 1 (May 6, 2021)	Matheus Almeida	31	Salvador			
Episode 1 (May 6, 2021)	Pedro Barbosa	26	Paracatu			
Episode 1 (May 6, 2021)	Cadu Moura	28	Recife			
Episode 1 (May 6, 2021)	Danilo Takigawa	30	Curitiba			
Episode 1 (May 6, 2021)	Herschel Veras	29	Teresina			
Episode 1 (May 6, 2021)	Ju Lima	26	Belo Horizonte			
Episode 1 (May 6, 2021)	Carol Francelino	27	São Paulo			
Episode 1 (May 6, 2021)	Pedro Franco	37	Rio de Janeiro			
Episode 1 (May 6, 2021)	Diogo Sabião	36	Porto Velho			
Episode 1 (May 6, 2021)	Ana Gabriela Costa	33	Belo Horizonte			
Episode 1 (May 6, 2021)	Ana Carolina Garcia	37	Rio de Janeiro			
Episode 1 (May 6, 2021)	Vitória Gasques	23	São Paulo			Team full
Episode 1 (May 6, 2021)	Rafa Campos	42	Rio de Janeiro	Team full		Team full

== Pressure tests ==
Episode	Challenge winner(s)			Eliminated
Episode	Team immunity	Individual elimination		Eliminated
Episode	Claude's choice	Master's save	Masters' choice	Eliminated
Episode 2 (May 13, 2021)	Team Rafa	Léo Modesto	Bia Pimentel	Ana Gabriela Costa
Episode 2 (May 13, 2021)	Team Rafa	Matheus Almeida	Bia Pimentel	Ana Gabriela Costa
Episode 2 (May 13, 2021)	Team Rafa	Pedro Barbosa	Bia Pimentel	Ana Gabriela Costa
Episode 2 (May 13, 2021)	Team Rafa	Cadu Moura	Bia Pimentel	Ana Gabriela Costa
Episode 3 (May 19, 2021)	Team Leo	Bia Pimentel	Danilo Takigawa	Leninha Camargo
Episode 3 (May 19, 2021)	Team Leo	Vitória Gasques	Danilo Takigawa	Leninha Camargo
Episode 3 (May 19, 2021)	Team Leo	Ana Carolina Garcia	Danilo Takigawa	Leninha Camargo
Episode 4 (May 27, 2021)	Team Kátia	Rodrigo Guimarães	Cadu Moura	Rafa Campos
Episode 4 (May 27, 2021)	Team Kátia	Carol Francelino	Cadu Moura	Rafa Campos
Episode 5 (June 3, 2021)	Team Rafa	Pedro Franco	Carol Francelino	Léo Modesto
Episode 5 (June 3, 2021)	Team Rafa	Bruna Martins	Carol Francelino	Léo Modesto
Episode 6 (June 10, 2021)	Team Leo	Bia Pimentel	Rodrigo Guimarães	Matheus Almeida
Episode 6 (June 10, 2021)	Team Leo	Ju Lima	Rodrigo Guimarães	Matheus Almeida
Episode 7 (June 17, 2021)	Team Leo	Pedro Franco	Ana Carolina Garcia	Ju Lima
Episode 7 (June 17, 2021)	Team Leo	Diogo Sabião	Ana Carolina Garcia	Ju Lima

== The Duels ==
Key

Contestant won the Duel and advanced to the Quarterfinals
Contestant lost the Duel and went to compete in the Wildcard

Episode	Challenger		Challenged	
Episode	Master	Contestant	Contestant	Master
Episode 8 (June 23, 2021)	Rafa Costa e Silva	Ana Carolina Garcia	Pedro Barbosa	Leo Paixão
Episode 8 (June 23, 2021)	Rafa Costa e Silva	Rodrigo Guimarães	Vitória Gasques	Kátia Barbosa
Episode 8 (June 23, 2021)	Rafa Costa e Silva	Diogo Sabião	Aline Guedes	Leo Paixão
Episode 8 (June 23, 2021)	Leo Paixão	Carol Francelino	Pedro Franco	Kátia Barbosa
Episode 8 (June 23, 2021)	Leo Paixão	Bruna Martins	Danilo Takigawa	Rafa Costa e Silva
Episode 8 (June 23, 2021)	Leo Paixão	Cadu Moura	Bia Pimentel	Kátia Barbosa

== Wildcard ==
Key

Contestant won the Wildcard and advanced to the Quarterfinals
Contestant lost the Wildcard and was eliminated

Episode	Order	Master	Contestant	Result
Episode 9 (July 1, 2021)
Episode 9 (July 1, 2021)	1	Kátia Barbosa	Pedro Franco	Advanced
Episode 9 (July 1, 2021)	2	Kátia Barbosa	Vitória Gasques	Advanced
Episode 9 (July 1, 2021)	3	Leo Paixão	Aline Guedes	Advanced
Episode 9 (July 1, 2021)	4	Leo Paixão	Bruna Martins	Eliminated
Episode 9 (July 1, 2021)	5	Kátia Barbosa	Bia Pimentel	Advanced
Episode 9 (July 1, 2021)	6	Rafa Costa e Silva	Ana Carolina Garcia	Eliminated
Episode 9 (July 1, 2021)	1	Kátia Barbosa	Pedro Franco	Eliminated
Episode 9 (July 1, 2021)	2	Kátia Barbosa	Bia Pimentel	Eliminated
Episode 9 (July 1, 2021)	3	Leo Paixão	Aline Guedes	Eliminated
Episode 9 (July 1, 2021)	4	Kátia Barbosa	Vitória Gasques	Advanced

== Elimination chart ==
Key

- Winner
- Runner-up
- Chosen to advance
- Not chosen
- Immune from round 2
- Eliminated

	Week 1		Week 2		Week 3	
	Round 1	Round 2	Round 1	Round 2	Round 1	Round 2
Rodrigo Guimarães	Safe	Immune	Not Chosen	Safe	Safe	Winner (week 3)
Pedro Barbosa	Not Chosen	Safe	Not Chosen	Safe	Safe	Runner-up (week 3)
Cadu Moura	Not Chosen	Safe	Safe	Immune	Eliminated	Eliminated (week 3)
Danilo Takigawa	Safe	Immune	Safe	Immune	Eliminated	Eliminated (week 3)
Carol Francelino	Not Chosen	Safe	Not Chosen	Eliminated	Eliminated (week 2)	
Vitória Gasques	Safe	Immune	Not Chosen	Eliminated	Eliminated (week 2)	
Diogo Sabião	Not Chosen	Eliminated	Eliminated (week 1)			

=== Week 1: Quarterfinals ===
Episode	Order	Master	Contestant	Result
Episode 10 (July 8, 2021)
Episode 10 (July 8, 2021)	1	Leo Paixão	Cadu Moura	Not Chosen
Episode 10 (July 8, 2021)	2	Rafa Costa e Silva	Rodrigo Guimarães	Safe
Episode 10 (July 8, 2021)	3	Leo Paixão	Carol Francelino	Not Chosen
Episode 10 (July 8, 2021)	4	Rafa Costa e Silva	Diogo Sabião	Not Chosen
Episode 10 (July 8, 2021)	5	Kátia Barbosa	Vitória Gasques	Safe
Episode 10 (July 8, 2021)	6	Rafa Costa e Silva	Danilo Takigawa	Safe
Episode 10 (July 8, 2021)	7	Leo Paixão	Pedro Barbosa	Not Chosen
Episode 10 (July 8, 2021)	1	Leo Paixão	Carol Francelino	Safe
Episode 10 (July 8, 2021)	2	Rafa Costa e Silva	Diogo Sabião	Eliminated
Episode 10 (July 8, 2021)	3	Leo Paixão	Pedro Barbosa	Safe
Episode 10 (July 8, 2021)	4	Leo Paixão	Cadu Moura	Safe

=== Week 2: Semifinals ===
Episode	Order	Master	Contestant	Result
Episode 11 (July 15, 2021)
Episode 11 (July 15, 2021)	1	Leo Paixão	Carol Francelino	Not Chosen
Episode 11 (July 15, 2021)	2	Leo Paixão	Pedro Barbosa	Not Chosen
Episode 11 (July 15, 2021)	3	Rafa Costa e Silva	Rodrigo Guimarães	Not Chosen
Episode 11 (July 15, 2021)	4	Kátia Barbosa	Vitória Gasques	Not Chosen
Episode 11 (July 15, 2021)	5	Rafa Costa e Silva	Danilo Takigawa	Safe
Episode 11 (July 15, 2021)	6	Leo Paixão	Cadu Moura	Safe
Episode 11 (July 15, 2021)	1	Leo Paixão	Carol Francelino	Eliminated
Episode 11 (July 15, 2021)	3	Rafa Costa e Silva	Rodrigo Guimarães	Safe
Episode 11 (July 15, 2021)	3	Leo Paixão	Pedro Barbosa	Safe
Episode 11 (July 15, 2021)	4	Kátia Barbosa	Vitória Gasques	Eliminated

=== Week 3: Finals ===
Episode	Order	Master	Contestant	Result
Episode 12 (July 22, 2021)
Episode 12 (July 22, 2021)	1	Leo Paixão	Pedro Barbosa	Safe
Episode 12 (July 22, 2021)	2	Rafa Costa e Silva	Danilo Takigawa	Eliminated
Episode 12 (July 22, 2021)	3	Rafa Costa e Silva	Rodrigo Guimarães	Safe
Episode 12 (July 22, 2021)	6	Leo Paixão	Cadu Moura	Eliminated
Episode 12 (July 22, 2021)	1	Leo Paixão	Pedro Barbosa	Runner-up
Episode 12 (July 22, 2021)	2	Rafa Costa e Silva	Rodrigo Guimarães	Winner

== Ratings and reception ==
=== Brazilian ratings ===
All numbers are in points and provided by Kantar Ibope Media.

Episode	Title	Air date	Timeslot (BRT)	SP viewers (in points)	Source
1	The Blind Tests	May 6, 2021	Thursday 10:30 p.m.	17.3	
2	The Pressure Tests 1	May 13, 2021	Thursday 10:30 p.m.	16.5	
3	The Pressure Tests 2	May 19, 2021	Wednesday 10:30 p.m.	16.2	
4	The Pressure Tests 3	May 27, 2021	Thursday 10:30 p.m.	16.9	
5	The Pressure Tests 4	June 3, 2021	Thursday 10:30 p.m.	15.7	
6	The Pressure Tests 5	June 10, 2021	Thursday 10:30 p.m.	16.4	
7	The Pressure Tests 6	June 17, 2021	Thursday 10:30 p.m.	15.7	
8	The Duels	June 23, 2021	Wednesday 10:30 p.m.	15.5	
9	Wildcard	July 1, 2021	Thursday 10:30 p.m.	15.9	
10	Quarterfinals	July 8, 2021	Thursday 10:30 p.m.	16.5	
11	Semifinals	July 15, 2021	Thursday 10:30 p.m.	16.9	
12	Finals	July 22, 2021	Thursday 10:30 p.m.	16.4	

- In 2021, each point represents 268.278 households in 15 market cities in Brazil (76.577 households in São Paulo).
