= Chandelly Braz =

Brazilian actress (born 1985)

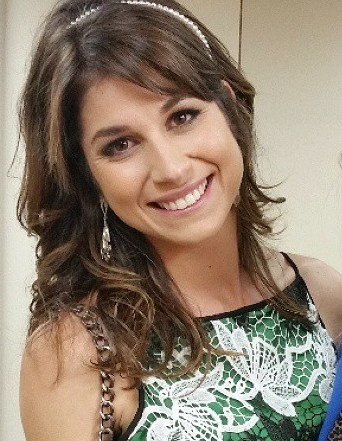
- Braz in 2014
- Born: Chandelly Paloma Pimentel Braz; January 3, 1985 (age 41); São Domingos do Prata, Brazil
- Occupation: Actress
- Years active: 2006–present

Chandelly Paloma Pimentel Braz (born January 3, 1985) is a Brazilian actress.

== Biography ==
Chandelly considers herself a Pernambucan because she arrived in that state as a baby: she was raised from the age of seven months in Ipojuca, a city in the Metropolitan Region of Recife, and as a teenager she moved to the capital of Pernambuco; however, she was born in the Minas Gerais municipality of São Domingos do Prata. Her name was chosen by her father, who found it on a list of baby names, and is associated with the Nestlé dessert "chandelle." She has three siblings: Rondineli, Naraiana and João Davi.

== Career ==
She began acting at the age of 19, her first television role being as the lead in the SBT miniseries Cruzamentos Urbanos. However, her career took off when she appeared in the play Clandestinos. At the time, Chandelly was in her first year of Social Work at the Federal University of Pernambuco when she heard about auditions for João Falcão's play, which became a miniseries on Rede Globo in 2010. In addition to acting in the play, she also appeared in the television adaptation. In Clandestinos - O Sonho Começou, she played a character of the same name who arrives in Rio de Janeiro seeking success, but believes her accent could be a hindrance to her career.

Later, she was called for an audition in Cheias de Charme, a 7pm soap opera on Globo. In the series by Filipe Miguez and Izabel de Oliveira, the actress played Brunessa, who had relationships with wealthy men to buy designer clothes. The character brought changes to her life. The actress started weight training three times a week to "build up her figure" and, without the help of any professional, lost her northeastern accent, as she played a carioca. In 2013 she starred in the remake of Saramandaia soap opera in which she played Marcina, a young woman who has high fevers and burns things and people around her.

In 2014, she played the northeastern protagonist Manuela, in Geração Brasil, repeating her partnership with Filipe Miguez and Izabel de Oliveira. In the plot directed by Denise Saraceni, with whom she worked on her two other soap operas, Chandelly forms a romantic couple with her boyfriend and fellow actor Humberto Carrão.

In 2015, she appeared in GNT's new series, Romance Policial - Espinosa, playing Andressa. In 2016, she played the cunning villain Carmela in Haja Coração. In 2017, she appeared in a new GNT series, Editorial Paraíso, playing Kátia. In 2018, she made a special appearance in a flashback in Walcyr Carrasco's O Outro Lado do Paraíso, playing Aline, Gael's (Sérgio Guizé) submissive wife. This was also the actress's first appearance in a 9 pm soap opera. Also in 2018, she played one of the protagonists of Pride and Passion, Mariana Benedito, alongside Nathalia Dill, Anajú Dorigon, Bruna Griphao, and Pâmela Tomé.

== Personal life ==
She began dating actor Humberto Carrão in 2012. The two began their romance behind the scenes of Cheias de Charme and went public with their relationship shortly after the show ended in October 2012. In 2022, after 10 years together, the couple decided to end their relationship.

== Filmography ==
=== Television ===
Year	Title	Character	Notes
2007	Cruzamentos Urbanos	Karla	
2010	Clandestinos: o Sonho Começou	Chandelly	
2012	Louco por Elas	Leiloca Moniquinha	Episode: "Abril 17"
2012	Cheias de Charme	Bruna Vanessa Almeida (Brunessa)	
2013	Saramandaia	Marcina Moreira	
2014	Geração Brasil	Manuela Yanes (Manu)	
2015	Romance Policial - Espinosa	Andressa	
2016	Haja Coração	Carmela Rigoni Di Marino	
2017	Edifício Paraíso	Kátia	
2018	O Outro Lado do Paraíso	Aline Montserrat	Episode: "March 10"
2018	Orgulho e Paixão	Mariana Benedito / Mário	
2022	Sob Pressão	Raissa	Episode: "3"
2022	O Cangaceiro do Futuro	Mariá	
2024	Suíte Magnólia	Olivia Souza Pinto	
2025	Maria e o Cangaço	DonDon	
2025	Raul Seixas: Eu Sou	Kika	

=== Cinema ===
Year	Title	Character	Note
2016	Sobre Nós	Ex-namorada	Short film
2019	Fernando	Atriz da peça	Documentary
2022	Bem-vinda a Quixeramobim	Shirleyanny	Feature film
2024	Abraço de Mãe	Cristina	

=== Internet ===
Year	Title	Character	Note
2019	Zodíaca: O Monólogo Definitivo de Cada Signo	Capricorniana	Episode: "A Capricorniana"

=== Music video ===
Year	Song	Artist
2014	"Alma Sebosa"	Johnny Hooker

== Theater ==
Year	Part	Role
2006–07	Elas	Carolina
2008	Clandestinos	Chandelly
2011–14	(Des)conhecidos	Girlfriend
2013–17	Elefante	Cléo
2014	Microteatro	She
2019	Os Sete Afluentes do Rio Ota	Various characters

== Awards and nominations ==
Year	Award	Category	Work	Result
2013	Prêmio Contigo! de TV	Revelação da TV	Cheias de Charme	Nominated
2013	Prêmio Quem de Televisão	Melhor Atriz Coadjuvante	Saramandaia	Nominated
2014	Prêmio Contigo! de TV	Melhor Atriz Coadjuvante	Saramandaia	Nominated
2014	Melhores do Ano	Melhor Atriz Revelação	Geração Brasil	Nominated
