= Max Petterson =

Brazilian actor (b.1994)

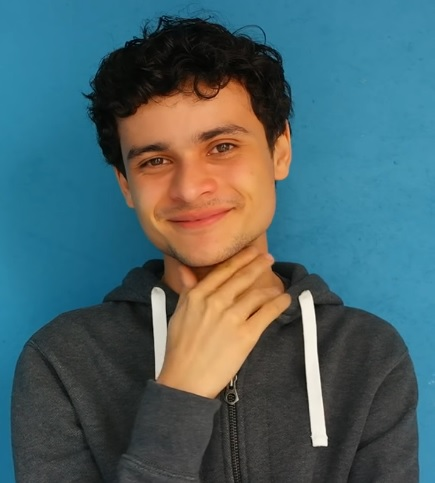
- Max Petterson on 2016 performance "Consciência"
- Born: Max Petterson Monteiro; January 16, 1994 (age 32); Farias Brito, Ceará, Brazil
- Occupation: Actress
- Years active: 2017–present
- Known for: Bem-vinda a Quixeramobim, O Cangaceiro do Futuro
- Website: www.maxpetterson.com

Max Petterson Monteiro (Farias Brito, Ceará, Brazil, born January 16, 1994) is a Brazilian actor, YouTuber, entrepreneur and comedian. He currently lives in Paris, France. Max Petterson is known for moving to France in 2014 after getting a place at the Paris 8 University Vincennes-Saint-Denis and documenting life in Paris on YouTube, with over 33 million views. Max received the most repercussions with a viral video about the heat in France.

Max's first acting film, "Bem-vinda a Quixeramobim" will premiere on April 4, 2022, at the Paris Brazilian Film Festival. Max is also part of Netflix series "O Cangaceiro do Futuro" to be released in 2022.

== Biography ==
=== Childhood, college and YouTube viral ===
Max Petterson was born and raised in the Cariri region in the interior of Ceará, Farias Brito. He is Ana Magnólia Monteiro's son and only child.

He attended high school at Gabriel Bezerra de Morais School. He participated in children's specials on the radio programs of Rádio Curtição FM and Rádio Cultura AM from 2003 to 2006. The first direct contact with performing arts happened through the city hall and an elementary school teacher in 2004. With the end of the project, Max participated in the formation of the theater company "Curumins do Sertão" in 2006. After leaving the group, Max entered the Regional University of Cariri in 2011 to study theater, but decided to leave the course due to difficulties in his line of research in early 2013. After rejection from Brazilian universities, through his advisor Márcio Rodrigues, Max contacted the College of Sorbonne, in France, in search of information about scholarships in the country, getting an answer and starting the selection process.

After months of receiving negatives from two French colleges, in July 2014 he was approved at the Paris 8 University Vincennes-Saint-Denis. A month before moving, due to financial difficulties, Max had launched a campaign to raise money to pay for his passage to France, where he was successful and was featured in the local Cariri newspaper.

On 2017, after sharing his impressions of the French heat in a YouTube video, Max went viral, getting over 1 million views. Since 2018, Max has been dedicated to producing YouTube videos with curiosities of the culture and art of the French region together with the tourism company he created for this purpose.

On February 28, 2019, Max was invited to the opening act of Whindersson Nunes' "Eita Casei" stand-up shows in France. On January 24, 2020, Max returned to Brazil to perform the stand-up "Bôcu Bonjour" in Fortaleza.

=== 2021–present: First movie and Netflix series ===
In October 2020, Max returned to Brazil for the shooting of his first film, "Bem-vinda a Quixeramobim" (in English Welcome to Quixeramobim) produced by Globo Filmes and directed by Halder Gomes. In the feature film, Max plays a buggy driver named Eri. Filming ended on December 19, 2020. Announced on February 7, 2022, the film will premiere at the 24th Paris Brazilian Film Festival on April 3.

Returning to Brazil again in November 2021, Max was invited to participate in the humor series directed by Halder Gomes and produced by Netflix, "O Cangaceiro do Futuro". With recording beginning in November 2021 through February 6, 2022, the series' plot is the arrival of an inhabitant to the Quixadá district from the future. "Cangaceiro do Futuro" is scheduled to premiere in late 2022.

== Filmography ==
=== Film ===
Year	Title	Role	Notes
2022	Bem-vinda a Quixeramobim	Eri	First acting movie

=== TV and Streaming ===
Year	Title	Role	Notes
2022	O Cangaceiro do Futuro	TBA	His first Netflix series
