= Mestre do Sabor =

Brazilian reality television cooking competition

- Genre: Reality competition Cooking show
- Presented by: Claude Troisgros; João Batista; Maria Joana; Monique Alfradique
- Judges: José Avillez; Kátia Barbosa; Leo Paixão; Rafael Costa e Silva
- Country of origin: Brazil
- Original language: Portuguese
- No. of seasons: 3
- No. of episodes: 37

Production
- Camera setup: Multiple-camera
- Running time: 90 minutes

Original release
- Network: TV Globo; GNT
- Release: October 10, 2019 – July 22, 2021

Mestre do Sabor (English: Taste Master) is a Brazilian reality television cooking competition format originally created, produced and aired by TV Globo. The series premiered on Thursday, October 10, 2019, at 10:30 p.m. / 9:30 p.m. (BRT / AMT).

The show features chefs competing against each other in various culinary challenges. They are mentored and judged by a panel of professional chefs and other notables from the food industry.

The first season generally received bad reviews from critics and its ratings were below average TV Globo's expectations. The series was renewed for a second season before the first had started airing.

== Series overview ==
Team Avillez
Team Katia
Team Leo
Team Rafa

| Season | First aired | Last aired | Winner | Other finalists | Winning master | Host(s) | Masters (table's order) | | |
| Season | First aired | Last aired | Winner | Other finalists | Winning master | Host(s) | 1 | 2 | 3 |
|---|---|---|---|---|---|---|---|---|---|
| 1 | October 10, 2019 | December 26, 2019 | Gabriel Coelho | Dudu Poerner | José Avillez | Claude Troisgros; João Batista; Maria Joana | Avillez | Kátia | Leo |
| 1 | October 10, 2019 | December 26, 2019 | Gabriel Coelho | Djalma Victor | José Avillez | Claude Troisgros; João Batista; Maria Joana | Avillez | Kátia | Leo |
| 1 | October 10, 2019 | December 26, 2019 | Gabriel Coelho | Lui Veronese | José Avillez | Claude Troisgros; João Batista; Maria Joana | Avillez | Kátia | Leo |
| 2 | April 30, 2020 | July 23, 2020 | Dário Costa | Ana Zambelli | Kátia Barbosa | Claude Troisgros; João Batista; Monique Alfradique | Avillez | Kátia | Leo |
| 2 | April 30, 2020 | July 23, 2020 | Dário Costa | Junior Marinho | Kátia Barbosa | Claude Troisgros; João Batista; Monique Alfradique | Avillez | Kátia | Leo |
| 2 | April 30, 2020 | July 23, 2020 | Dário Costa | Serginho Jucá | Kátia Barbosa | Claude Troisgros; João Batista; Monique Alfradique | Avillez | Kátia | Leo |
| 3 | May 6, 2021 | July 22, 2021 | Rodrigo Guimarães | Pedro Barbosa | Rafael Costa e Silva | Claude Troisgros; João Batista; Monique Alfradique | Rafa | Kátia | Leo |
| 3 | May 6, 2021 | July 22, 2021 | Rodrigo Guimarães | Cadu Moura | Rafael Costa e Silva | Claude Troisgros; João Batista; Monique Alfradique | Rafa | Kátia | Leo |
| 3 | May 6, 2021 | July 22, 2021 | Rodrigo Guimarães | Danilo Takigawa | Rafael Costa e Silva | Claude Troisgros; João Batista; Monique Alfradique | Rafa | Kátia | Leo |

== Ratings and reception ==
=== Brazilian ratings ===
All numbers are in points and provided by Kantar Ibope Media.

| Season | Timeslot (BRT) | Premiered | | Ended | | TV season | SP viewers (in points) | Source |
| Season | Timeslot (BRT) | Date | Viewers (in points) | Date | Viewers (in points) | TV season | SP viewers (in points) | Source |
|---|---|---|---|---|---|---|---|---|
| 1 | Thursday 10:30 p.m. | October 10, 2019 | 18.7 | December 26, 2019 | 17.7 | 2019 | 17.72 | |
| 2 | Thursday 10:30 p.m. | April 30, 2020 | 16.3 | July 23, 2020 | 19.8 | 2020 | 18.18 | |
| 3 | Thursday 10:30 p.m. | May 6, 2021 | 17.3 | July 22, 2021 | 16.4 | 2021 | 16.25 | |

- Each point represents a specific number of households in São Paulo.
  - 2019: 73.015 households.
  - 2020: 74.987 households.
  - 2021: 76.577 households.
