= Sunland Heat =

- DVD cover
- Directed by: Halder Gomes
- Written by: Sílvio Gurjão
- Produced by: Halder Gomes
- Starring: J. J. Perry
- Cinematography: Roberto Iuri
- Edited by: Gláucia Soares
- Music by: Marcio Rocha
- Release date: 2004
- Running time: 81 minutes
- Country: United States
- Language: English
- Budget: R$127,000

Sunland Heat (Portuguese: Sunland Heat – No Calor da Terra do Sol) is a 2004 American martial arts film directed by Halder Gomes and starring J. J. Perry.

== Cast ==
- Alex Van Hagen as Jennifer
- J. J. Perry as Matthews
- Jay Richardson as Daniel
- André Lima as John Paul
- Laura Putney as Jackie
- Halder Gomes as Carlos
- Odilon Camargo as Roy
- Alexandre Picarelli as Mark

== Production ==
Working as stunt in American martial arts films, Gomes came with the idea of producing a martial art film shot in his birth city, Fortaleza, Ceará. However, Gomes prepared no script, then he went to a local film school and announced he was looking for a script writer for a martial arts film. The next step was to raise funds, which was done through gubernamental tax incentives. For the casting Gomes put an ad in the Back Stage West, and received about 3,000 subsmissions. He was worried to cast people who had already travelled to another country because he thought the recentness of September 11 attacks could affect actor's performance. The film was shot both in Ceará and Los Angeles during a period of four weeks.
