= The Morgue =

- Film poster
- Directed by: Halder Gomes; Gerson Sanginitto
- Written by: Najla Ann-Doori (story & writer); Andrew Pletcher (writer)
- Starring: Heather Donahue; Bill Cobbs; Lisa Crilley; Brandon Quinn; Sammy Sheik; Michael Raye
- Distributed by: Reef Pictures; Lionsgate (DVD)
- Release date: April 2008
- Running time: 84 minutes.
- Country: United States
- Language: English

The Morgue is a 2008 direct-to-DVD horror film directed by Halder Gomes and Gerson Sanginitto, written by Najla Ann Al-Doori and Andrew Pletcher, and starring Heather Donahue in her final role before her retirement.

== Plot synopsis ==
The protagonist Margo Dey is paying her way through college by working part-time in a morgue. Her only living companion in the long nights at the morgue is George, the night watchman, who is stricken with grief from the loss of his daughter. As the story unfolds more characters, including Jill, a frightened young girl, are introduced.

== Cast ==
- Heather Donahue as Nan
- Bill Cobbs as George
- Lisa Crilley as Margo
- Chris Devlin as Peter
- Googy Gress as Det. Chet White
- Brady Matthews as Det. Philip Drake
- Taylor Lipman as Jill
- Fred Ochs as Chief Will Malone
- Brandon Quinn as Jacob
- Michael Raye as Horace Sparks
- Sammy Sheik as Samim
- Chris Torres as Dark Figure

== Critical reception ==
Allan Dart, writing for Fangoria, found the directors Gomes and Sanginitto went for psychological suspense instead of mere gore, but felt the film was predictable. Dread Central called it "cheap fun, better than expected, but come the next day you'll hardly remember its name."

== See also ==
- List of American films of 2008
