= Growgirl =

2012 book by Heather Donahue

Growgirl: How My Life After the Blair Witch Project Went to Pot
- First edition
- Author: Heather Donahue
- Genre: Memoir
- Published: 2012
- Publisher: Gotham Books
- Publication place: United States
- Pages: 352
- ISBN: 978-1-592-40692-0

Growgirl: How My Life After The Blair Witch Project Went to Pot is a 2012 book by former actor Heather Donahue about dropping out of Hollywood and moving to a semi-collective society in Nevada County, California's Sierra Mountains called "Nuggettown" to become first a "pot wife" then embrace the "backbreaking, spirit-sucking work" of a cannabis grower.

== Critical reception ==
The Hollywood Reporter called the work "always funny and surprisingly sweet". Publishers Weekly said it was "wry, with a nuanced distance from the events". Kirkus Reviews called it "at times funny, sensitive or filled with obscenities...an intimate look at a woman's yearlong search for her place in the world".

== See also ==
- List of books about cannabis
