= Heather Donahue =

American actress, writer (born 1974)

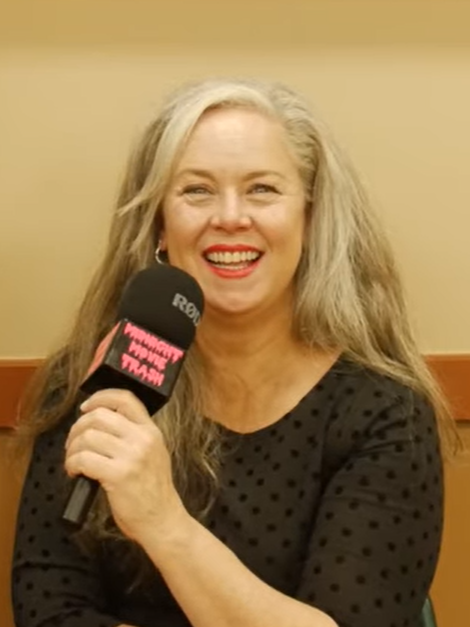
- Donahue in 2026
- Born: Heather Donahue; December 22, 1974 (age 51); Upper Darby Township, Pennsylvania, U.S.
- Education: University of the Arts, Philadelphia (BFA)
- Occupations: Actress; businesswoman; writer
- Years active: 1995–2008 (acting); 2008–present

Rei Hance (born Heather Donahue; December 22, 1974) is an American businesswoman and retired actress. She is best known for her appearance in the found footage film The Blair Witch Project (1999) and the science fiction miniseries Taken (2002). She retired from acting in 2008 and became a medical marijuana grower. She legally changed her name to Rei Hance in 2020.

== Early life ==
Heather Donahue was born on December 22, 1974, in Upper Darby, Pennsylvania, the daughter of Joan, an office manager, and James Donahue, a printer. She graduated from Philadelphia's University of the Arts in 1995 with a BFA in theater, and also performed in productions at the Battersea Arts Centre in London, England, where she apprenticed in conjunction with the University of the Arts London. After completing her studies, she worked as an administrative office temp worker while appearing in New York stage productions.

== Career ==
=== 1995–2008: The Blair Witch Project and acting ===
Donahue's first screen appearance, and best known role, is in the 1999 found-footage horror film The Blair Witch Project. Her role in the film originated in 1997, when she read about an audition that was being advertised in Backstage magazine for actors with strong improvisational abilities, which were needed for an independent horror film. She auditioned at the Musical Theater Works in New York City and was cast in one of the three principal roles. She and the two other main cast members Michael C. Williams and Joshua Leonard were cast as characters that would share their given names. She would come to regret this later in life, changing her name to Rei Hance years after retiring from acting.

For the role, Donahue had to learn how to operate a camera, spending two days in a crash course. She said she modeled her character after a director that she once worked with, citing the character's self-assuredness, when everything went as planned, and confusion during crisis. After filming, Donahue and the two other leads were asked not to appear on any television shows or in any films, as the filmmakers made great advertising efforts to portray the events in the film as factual, including the distribution of flyers at festivals such as the Sundance Film Festival, asking viewers to come forward with any information about the "missing" students. The IMDb page for the film also listed the actors as "missing, presumed dead" in the first year of the film's availability. The promotion for the film was so convincing that Donahue's mother received sympathy cards from people who believed that her daughter was actually dead or missing.

Once released, the film received unexpected acclaim from critics and became a resounding box office success–grossing over US$248 million worldwide, making it one of the most successful independent movies of all time. While being nominated for a Blockbuster Entertainment Award for Favorite Actress – Newcomer, and an Online Film Critics Society Award for Best Actress, Donahue was also nominated for worst actress at the Stinkers Bad Movie Awards, and won in the same category at the Golden Raspberry Awards. Donahue later admitted there was a considerable amount of backlash against her because of her association with the film, which led to her having threatening encounters with people, and difficulty finding other employment.

A year after the release of The Blair Witch Project, she appeared in the independent film Home Field Advantage, and alongside Freddie Prinze, Jr. and Jason Biggs in the romantic comedy Boys and Girls. In 2001, she appeared in the independent film Seven and a Match and in the short film The Velvet Tigress. In 2002, she had a co-starring role in the science fiction miniseries Taken, for which she was nominated for a Saturn Award for Best Supporting Actress on Television. The same year, she appeared in an array of short films and televised films, such as The Walking Hack of Asbury Park, New Suit and The Big Time. In 2005, she guest-starred in an episode of the comedy series It's Always Sunny in Philadelphia. Her last acting role was in the 2008 direct-to-DVD horror film The Morgue.

=== 2008–present: Business and writing ventures ===
Donahue left acting in 2008 to become a medical marijuana grower. In 2011, she signed a publishing deal for her debut book Growgirl, about her time as a marijuana grower, which was released on January 5, 2012 by Gotham Books. In 2013 she was residing in Nevada City, California. At the time, she was also reported to be developing a line of herbal skin-care products. In a 2016 interview in GQ, she discussed the ongoing challenges associated with having used her birth name in The Blair Witch Project – a name she was still using at the time of the interview. The same interview revealed that she was writing for, and intended to produce, a sitcom tentatively called The High Country, based on her experiences in marijuana farming.

During the development of the 2016 sequel to The Blair Witch Project, she was contacted by the film's producers for permission to use her name and likeness in the film, which she later stated was a difficult decision: "My name and face are forever going to be someone else's intellectual property. My snot-flooded portrait was back. It's all anyone wanted to talk to me about... Then Lionsgate called. The company that originally bought The Blair Witch Project was purchased by Lionsgate and they're the ones behind this new sequel. They asked what they could do to show me how much they appreciated my work in the original. They made sure my last name wasn't used anywhere. In their press materials, their protagonist goes in search of his 'sister' but they don't use my name. For all the talk of Hollywood being populated with jerks and sharks, these guys were actually being considerate and were genuinely concerned that this would not be any more disruptive to my life than was inevitable".

In 2020, she formally changed her name to Rei Hance. Hance stated in a 2021 interview that she was paid a sum of money for the use of her likeness in the sequel, but that it had followed eight years of "constant failure" in her life, and so she "took that money and just drove around North America, getting shitfaced for about two years, and hoping I would die. Like I did not want to be alive anymore." She subsequently relocated to Freedom, Maine, and became sober. She served on the town's Select Board for a year until 2025 when she was recalled after a dispute over a public easement. She is a practicing Buddhist.

== Filmography ==
=== Film ===
Year	Title	Role	Notes
1999	The Blair Witch Project	Heather Donahue	Golden Raspberry Award for Worst Actress; Nominated – Blockbuster Entertainment Award for Favorite Actress – Newcomer; Nominated – Online Film Critics Society Award for Best Actress
1999	Sticks and Stones: An Exploration of the Blair Witch Legend	Heather Donahue	
2000	The Massacre of The Burkittsville 7: The Blair Witch Legacy	Heather Donahue	Archival footage only
2000	Book of Shadows: Blair Witch 2	Heather Donahue	Archival footage only
2000	Home Field Advantage	Wendy Waitress	
2000	Boys and Girls	Megan	
2001	Seven and a Match	Whit	
2001	The Velvet Tigress	—N/a	Short film
2002	The Walking Hack of Asbury Park	Wendy	Short film
2002	New Suit	Molly	
2002	The Big Time	Heather	Television film
2005	Manticore	Cpl. Keats	Television film
2008	The Morgue	Nan	
2016	Blair Witch	Heather Donahue	Archival footage only

=== Television ===
Year	Title	Role	Notes
2001	The Outer Limits	Claire Linkwood	Episode: "The Surrogate"
2002	Taken	Mary Crawford	Main cast (miniseries); Nominated – Saturn Award for Best Supporting Actress on Television
2003	Without a Trace	Linda Schmidt	Episode: "The Friendly Skies"
2005	It's Always Sunny in Philadelphia	Stacy Corvelli	Episode: "Charlie Wants an Abortion"
