= Christmas Full of Grace =

Um Natal Cheio de Graça
- Netflix film poster
- Directed by: Pedro Antonio
- Written by: Carolina García; Fil Braz
- Produced by: Carol Alckmin; Dora Amorim; Mayra Lucas; Paulo Serpa
- Starring: Sérgio Malheiros; Gessica Kayane; Vera Fischer
- Cinematography: Rodrigo Graciosa
- Edited by: Leonardo Gouvea; Rená Tardin
- Music by: Zé Ricardo
- Production company: GLAZ Entertainment
- Distributed by: Netflix
- Release date: November 30, 2022
- Running time: 104 minutes
- Country: Brazil
- Language: Portuguese

Christmas Full of Grace (Portuguese: Um Natal Cheio de Graça) is a 2022 Brazilian Christmas romantic comedy film directed by Pedro Antonio and written by Carolina García and Fil Braz. It stars Sérgio Malheiros, Gessica Kayane and Vera Fischer. It premiered on November 30, 2022, on Netflix.

== Plot ==
Carlinhos (Sérgio Malheiros) planned to propose to his girlfriend, on the eve of his family's Christmas dinner, where the two would go together to celebrate with Carlinhos' grandmother. It is then that he discovers that his girlfriend has cheated on him with another woman. Rushing out of the apartment they shared, he meets Graça (Gessica Kayane), a woman who gives him the idea of posing as a fake couple to cover up his girlfriend's betrayal. In this desperate measure, in order not to upset the family, on one of the most important dates of the year, Carlinhos accepts Graça's idea, but soon discovers that it was a bad strategy. Party girl and frank, Graça begins to disturb the Christmas dinner in the mansion of Lady Sofia (Vera Fischer), the matriarch of the family. Soon it is revealed that Graça lost her father, who was Papa Noel (Santa Claus). Since losing her father, Graça spends her Christmas with a different family each year, in hopes of not spending Christmas alone. Carlinhos and Graça start developing feelings towards each other, the more time they spend together. When going to a Christmas Festival, she runs into one of the families she spent Christmas with. After running away Carlinhos and Graça wind up making out, which leads them to sleep together. The next day, tired of living a lie, Graça decides to leave, but Dona Francisca convinces her to stay. Bebela (Carlinhos ex-girlfriend) shows up and Graça's secret is revealed to the family by Pedro Alfonso who is Carlinhos cousin. He calls Carlinhos a chump for being duped by his girlfriend. It is also revealed that Pedro Alfonso's girlfriend and Bebela had a secret affair and she's here so that they can finally be together. After telling Graça that he can no longer trust her, she gets angry for judging her so easily and leaves. He regrets saying what he said to Graça and tries everything in his will to get her back. Lady Sophia convinces Graça to go to the New Year's Eve party and there she and Carlinhos make up and share a kiss. shows

== Cast ==
The actors participating in this film are:

- Sérgio Malheiros as Carlinhos
- Gessica Kayane as Gracia
- Vera Fischer as Lady Sofia
- Leticia Isnard
- Monique Alfradique
- Leticia Isnard
- Heitor Martínez
- Diogo Defante
- Valéria Vitoriano
- Nando Cunha
- Gabriel Louchard
- Flávia Reis
- Marianna Armellini
- Cezar Maracujá
- Noemia Oliveira
- Valentina Vieira
- Victor Meyniel

== Production ==
Filming began in November 2021 and ended in early December of the same year. It was filmed entirely in Rio de Janeiro in the Leblon neighborhood, located in the South Zone

== See also ==
- List of Christmas films
