= Cine Holliúdy =

2012 film directed by Halder Gomes

- Directed by: Halder Gomes
- Written by: Halder Gomes
- Produced by: Halder Gomes
- Starring: Edmilson Filho; Miriam Freeland; Rainer Cadete; Joel Gomes
- Cinematography: Carina Sanginitto
- Edited by: Helgi Thor
- Release date: June 8, 2012 (Cine Ceará Festival)
- Running time: 91 minutes
- Country: Brazil
- Language: Portuguese
- Box office: R$5,024,612

Cine Holliúdy is 2012 Brazilian comedy film, directed by Halder Gomes and starring Edmilson Filho, Miriam Freeland and Roberto Bomtempo, based on the award-winning short film Cine Holiúdy – O Astista Contra o Caba do Mal.

The film premiered at the Cine Ceará Festival on June 8, 2012. It was released on August 9, 2013 in Fortaleza and some cities of the metropolitan region for general public.

== Plot ==
The arrival of television in the country side of Ceará, in the 70s, put into question the small movie theaters businesses. But a hero named Francisgleydisson, decided to fight to keep alive his passion for cinema.

== Cast ==
- Edmilson Filho as Francisgleydisson
- Miriam Freeland as Maria Das Graças
- Joel Gomes as Francisgleydisson's son
- Roberto Bomtempo as Olegário Elpídio
- Angeles Woo as TV host
- Fiorella Mattheis as "the Dream's Girl"
- Rainer Cadete as Shaolin
- Karla Karenina as soccer's supporter
- Marcio Greyck as buyer of cars
- Jorge Ritchie as priest Mesquita
- Fernanda Callou as Whelbaneyde
- Falcão as Isaías
- Haroldo Guimarães as Ling, Orilaudo Lécio e Munízio
- João Neto as "the Drunky"
