= Seven and a Match =

2001 film by Derek Simonds

- Directed by: Derek Simonds
- Written by: Derek Simonds
- Produced by: Steven Bratter; Mickey Cottrell; David Effress; Peter Brook; Sybil Robson Orr
- Cinematography: Uta Briesewitz
- Edited by: Poppy Das
- Music by: Emanuele Arnone; Dino Herrmann
- Release date: April 21, 2001 (Los Angeles Film Festival)
- Running time: 99 minutes
- Country: United States
- Language: English

Seven and a Match is a 2001 American comedy-drama film directed and written by Derek Simonds. It was released in the United States on April 21, 2003.

== Plot ==
Unemployed Ellie has invited a group of her ex-Yale University friends over to her dead parents' house to help her burn the house down for insurance money. This causes the group to explore their own feelings.

== Cast ==
- Eion Bailey as Sid
- Heather Donahue as Wit
- Devon Gummersall as Matthew
- Tina Holmes as Ellie
- Adam Scott as Peter
- Daniel Sauli as Tim
- Petra Wright as Blair
