= J. J. Perry =

American director and actor

- Born: 1967 (age 58–59)
- Other names: J.J. "Loco" Perry; Jordan J. Perry
- Occupations: Action director, martial artist, actor, stuntman
- Awards: 2004 Male Stuntman of the Year Award (World Stunt Awards)

Jordan Andrew "J. J." Perry is an American action director, martial artist, actor, and stuntman.

== Career ==
Perry began practicing martial arts training in 1975, at the age of eight. Because his mother was not able to afford her son's lessons, he cleaned a martial arts school, and received lessons in trade. He began performing stunt work in the late 1980s after leaving the military. Perry was a fourth-degree black belt in taekwondo by 1993.

He began his acting career when he did stunt work for the character of Johnny Cage in the first Mortal Kombat film. He then played Scorpion, Cyrax, and Noob Saibot in Mortal Kombat Annihilation (Chris Casamassa was supposed to reprise as Scorpion but was working on the film Batman & Robin, though he would return in Conquest), and appeared in the MK: Conquest TV series, this time as Scorpion's main rival Sub-Zero, in addition to doing stuntwork for the main character of Kung Lao. In addition to the Mortal Kombat series, Perry has done stuntwork for various television shows and movies such as Buffy the Vampire Slayer, The Scorpion King, 24, Beowulf and The Town as FBI Swat 2. He was a member of the cast of the 2004 movie Sunland Heat, and part of the stunt team for the 2006 fighting movie Ultraviolet.

Perry shared in the Male Stuntman of the Year Award at the 2004 World Stunt Awards for his work in the 2003 action comedy film The Rundown. He was also voted 2012 Stunt Coordinator of the Year at the short-lived (2010-2012) ActionFest action movie festival (founded by Chuck Norris's stunt double, director, and younger brother Aaron Norris).

In 2022, Perry directed his first feature-length film, Day Shift. In May 2023, Perry was announced to direct a film adaptation of Jay Bonansinga's novel The Killer's Game. In 2024, Perry was announced to direct a film adaptation of the Red 5 Comics graphic novel Afterburn.

== Filmography ==
=== Director ===
- Day Shift (2022)
- The Killer's Game (2024)
- Afterburn (2025)

=== Stunt double ===
Year	Title	Director	Artist
1995	Mortal Kombat	Paul W.S. Anderson	Linden Ashby
2005	Be Cool	F. Gary Gray	John Travolta
2005	XXX: State of the Union	Lee Tamahori	Barry Sigismondi
2005	Serenity	Joss Whedon	Nathan Fillion
2005	Today You Die	Don E. FauntLeRoy	Jamie McShane
2006	The Hard Easy	Ari Ryan	David Boreanaz
2013	Homefront	Gary Fleder	Clancy Brown

=== Acting roles ===
Year	Title	Role	Notes
1993	Full Impact	Louis's Street Fighter	
1996	Bloodsport III	J. J. Tucker	
1997	Mortal Kombat Annihilation	Cyrax / Scorpion / Noob Saibot / Tarkatan (Baraka)	
1998	Deadly Ransom	Tony	
1998	Enter the Eagles	Ben	
2001	The Rage Within	Jay	
2001	The Silent Force	Rookie	
2003	Timecop 2: The Berlin Decision	Officer	
2004	Spartan	Bodyguard	
2004	Max Havoc: Curse of the Dragon	Boxing referee	
2004	Sunland Heat	Matthews	
2005	Today You Die	Thug	
2007	Adventures of Johnny Tao	Lido	
2008	The Shepherd: Border Patrol	Illegal immigrant	
2009	Tea and Remembrance	Bar patron	Short film
2009	The Tournament	Montoya	
2011	Haywire	Max	
2012	Get the Gringo	Reginald T. Barnes	

=== Other credits ===
Year	Title	Director	Role
2008	Beyond the Ring	Gerson Sanginttio	Fight director
2009	Blood and Bone	Ben Ramsey	Martial arts director
2010	The Experiment	Paul T. Scheuring	Action coordinator
2011	Warrior	Gavin O'Connor	Walla group
2012	Django Unchained	Quentin Tarantino	Stunt performer
2013	Olympus Has Fallen	Antoine Fuqua	Fight performer
2014	John Wick	Chad Stahelski and David Leitch	Stunt player
2026	Toxic	Geetu Mohandas	Action sequences choreographer

=== TV movies ===
Year	Title	Role
1994	Vanishing Son I	Stunts
1994	CyberTracker	Stunts
1994	Vanishing Son II	Stunts
1994	Vanishing Son III	Stunts
1994	Vanishing Son IV	Stunts
2005	The Poseidon Adventure	Stunt performer
2005	Walker, Texas Ranger: Trial by Fire	Stunts
2007	All I Want for Christmas	Livestock trainer
2007	Sharpshooter	Stunt performer
2017	The Saint	Stunt coordinator

=== Stunts ===
Year	Title	Notes
1993	Walker, Texas Ranger	100 episodes
1995	WMAC Masters	Stunt ninja
1996	Nash Bridges	
1998	Charmed	
1998–99	Mortal Kombat: Conquest	Stunt actor and double for Alexander Walters (2 episodes)
1999	Angel	
1999	V.I.P.	Episode "The Quick and the Dead"
2001	Crossing Jordan	
2002	V.I.P.	Episode "48½ Hours"
2002	She Spies	
2002	Firefly	
2002	Birds of Prey	
2002	The Chang Family Saves the World	Unaired pilot
2006	Fallen	Miniseries
2014	True Blood	Episode "Jesus Gonna Be Here"

=== Acting roles ===
Year	Title	Role	Notes
1994	Duckman	Ninja	Episode "Papa Oom M.O.W. M.O.W."
1998–99	Mortal Kombat: Conquest	Sub-Zero	
2001	Fear Factor	Himself	
2006	CSI: NY	Keith Gale	Episode "Heroes"

=== Other credits ===
Year	Title	Role	Notes
2006	American Misfits	Fight coordinator	
2017	S.W.A.T.	Stunt coordinator	Episode "Pilot"
2019	Stumptown	Stunt coordinator	Episode "Forget It Dex, It's Stumptown"
2021	The Falcon and the Winter Soldier	Stunt performer	Episode "The Star-Spangled Man"
2021	Shadow and Bone	Stunt coordinator, stunt director: second unit and second unit director	Episode "A Searing Burst of Light"

=== Web series ===
Year	Title	Role	Notes
2000	Mortal Kombat: Federation of Martial Arts	Sub-Zero	9 episodes
2009	Angel of Death	—N/a	Stunts
