= Carnaval (2021 film) =

2021 Brazilian film

- Directed by: Leandro Neri
- Written by: Peu Barbalho; Audemir Leuzinger; Luisa Mascarenhas; Leandro Neri
- Starring: Lipy Adler; Nikolas Antunes; Giovana Cordeiro
- Distributed by: Netflix
- Release date: June 2, 2021
- Running time: 94 minutes
- Country: Brazil
- Language: Portuguese

Carnaval is a 2021 Brazilian comedy film directed by Leandro Neri, written by Peu Barbalho, Audemir Leuzinger, Luisa Mascarenhas and Leandro Neri, starring Lipy Adler, Nikolas Antunes and Giovana Cordeiro. The film was digitally released on June 2, 2021, by Netflix.

== Cast ==
- Lipy Adler as Marcão
- Nikolas Antunes as Jorge
- Giovana Cordeiro as Nina
- Bruna Inocencio as Mayra
- Gessica Kayane as Michelle
- Rafael Medrado as Samir
- Micael Borges as Freddy Nunes
- Samya Pascotto as Vivi
- Flavia Pavanelli as Luana
- Jean Pedro as Salvador

== Reception ==
On the review aggregator website Rotten Tomatoes, 17% of 6 critics' reviews are positive, with an average rating of 4.70/10.
