= Gkay =

Brazilian actress

Gessica Kayane
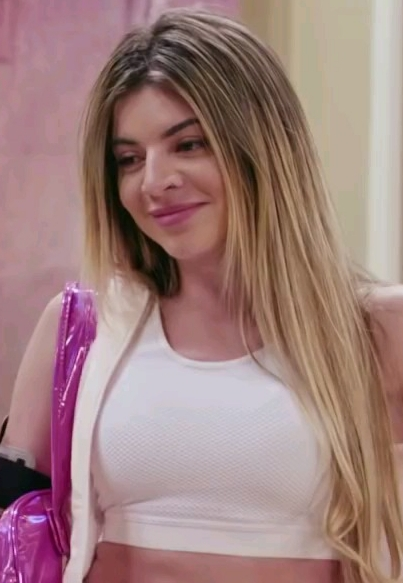
- Gkay in 2019
- Born: Gessica Kayane Rocha de Vasconcelos; Solânea, Paraiba
- Occupation: actress
- Years active: 2014–present
- Known for: Os Roni, Carnaval and Christmas Full of Grace

Instagram information
- Page: gessica
- Years active: 2012-present
- Followers: 20.5 million

TikTok information
- Page: gkay
- Followers: 9.4 million

YouTube information
- Channel: GKAY
- Years active: 2015–2022
- Genres: Beauty; Fashion
- Subscribers: 1.66 million
- Views: 73 million

Gessica Kayane Rocha de Vasconcelos, better known as Gkay, is a Brazilian actress, YouTuber and TikToker. As an actress, she is best known for starring in the films Christmas Full of Grace and Carnaval on Netflix, and Os Roni on the Multishow channel. She is the presenter of the reality television show LOL: Se Rir, Já Era! from Amazon Prime Video.

== Filmography ==
=== Television ===
Year	Title	Role	Notes
2019–21	Os Roni	Zefa /Jennyfer	
2020	Dra. Darci	Kate	Episodes: "Piquenique a Luz de Velas"
2022	Dança dos Famosos	Participante (11º Lugar)	Temporada 19
2022	LOL: Se Rir, Já Era!	Host	
2022	Nada Suspeitos	Xandra Zannarah	
2022	Vai Que Cola	Gessica	Episódio: "Farofa nas Arábias"

=== Movies ===
Year	Title	Role	Notes
2021	Carnaval	Michelle	
2021	Detetive Madeinusa	Marcela	
2022	Me Tira da Mira	Laura Lipsync	
2022	Christmas Full of Grace	Graça	

== Awards and nominations ==
Year	Award	Category	Nomination	Result	Ref.
2019	MTV Millennial Awards 2019	Danceokê	"Eu Vou Tu Vai"	Nominated	
2020	MTV Millennial Awards 2020	Creator Absurdo	Gkay	Nominated	
2020	Prêmio Jovem Brasileiro	Influencer de Humor	Gkay e Lucas Rangel	Won	
2022	MTV Millennial Awards	Creator Supremo	Gkay	Nominated	
2022	MTV Millennial Awards	Ícone MIAW	Gkay	Won	
