= São Domingos do Prata =

Brazilian municipality

Coordinates: 19°51′54″S 42°58′4″W

- Municipality
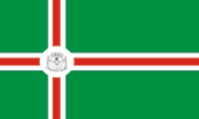
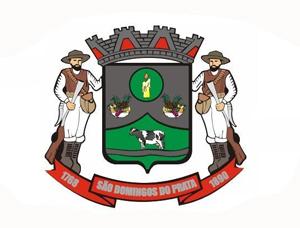
- Flag Coat of arms
- Interactive map of São Domingos do Prata
- Country: Brazil
- State: Minas Gerais
- Region: Southeast
- Time zone: UTC−3 (BRT)

Location of São Domingos do Prata within Minas Gerais

São Domingos do Prata is a Brazilian municipality located in the state of Minas Gerais. The city belongs to the mesoregion Metropolitana de Belo Horizonte and to the microregion of Itabira. As of 2020, the estimated population was 17,327.

== See also ==
- List of municipalities in Minas Gerais
