= Welcome to Quixeramobim =

- Portuguese: Bem-vinda a Quixeramobim
- Directed by: Halder Gomes
- Screenplay by: L.G. Bayão; Marina Morais; Halder Gomes; Marcio Wilson
- Produced by: Mayra Lucas; Angelo Ravazi; Paulo Serpa
- Starring: Monique Alfradique; Max Petterson; Edmilson Filho; Chandelly Braz; Falcão
- Cinematography: Carina Sanginitto
- Edited by: Helgi Thor
- Production company: Glaz Entertainment
- Distributed by: Globo Filmes
- Release dates: April 13, 2022 (Brazilian Film Festival); 2022 (Brazil)
- Running time: 106 minutes
- Country: Brazil
- Language: Portuguese
- Budget: 5 million BRL

Welcome to Quixeramobim (Portuguese: Bem-vinda a Quixeramobim) is a 2022 Brazilian comedy film produced by Glaz Entertainment, distributed by Downtown and directed by Halder Gomes. Assigned to the title, Monique Alfradique plays the main character. The film was shot between October and December 2020. The film will premiere at the 24th Brazilian Film Festival in Paris on April 3, 2022.

== Plot ==
A comedy that tells the story of Aimee, a woman in her thirties, heiress of a millionaire businessman involved in a corruption case. Forced for the first time to do without her father's money to support herself, Aimée will have to find refuge in the last family property still available: a ruined farm in Quixeramobim, in the Ceará countryside. Ashamed of her situation, she decides to start lying on social media and will discover another kind of life in the countryside.

== Cast ==
- Monique Alfradique as Aimée
- Edmilson Filho as Darlan
- Max Petterson as Eri
- Chandelly Braz as Shirleyanny
- Luís Miranda as Doutor Alexandre
- Silvero Pereira as Heron
- Falcão as Seu Aurenizo
- Carri Costa as Do contra
- Mateus Honori as Zé Qualé
- Araci Breckenfeld as Amelia Lima
- Haroldo Guimarães as Seu Amâncio
- Roberta Wermont as Dona Clemilda
- Valeria Vitoriano as Genésia Gilda
- Paulo Sérgio "Bolachinha" as Meiota
- Amadeu Maya Policial Federal
