= O Cangaceiro do Futuro =

- portuguese: O Cangaceiro do Futuro
- Genre: comedy
- Created by: Halder Gomes
- Written by: Chico Amorim; Paulo Leiere; Clara Deak; Lucas de Rosa; Halder Gomes
- Directed by: Halder Gomes; Glauber Filho
- Country of origin: Brazil
- Original language: Portuguese
- No. of seasons: 1
- No. of episodes: 7

Production
- Producers: Mayra Lucas; Carolina Alckmin
- Production locations: Ceará; São Paulo

Original release
- Network: Netflix
- Release: 25 December 2022

O Cangaceiro do Futuro (The Cangaceiro of the Future; American title: Time Hustler) is a Brazilian comedy series expected to debut in 2022 directed by Halder Gomes and Glauber Filho, with screenplay by Chico Amorim, Paulo Leierer, Clara Deak, Lucas de Rosa, and Halder Gomes. It is produced by Mayra Lucas and Carolina Alckmin, by GLAZ Entertainment. The series has seven episodes and will be appear on Netflix.

== Plot ==
The series begins in 2021, where Virguley lives tight with the bills and without morals in São Paulo. He makes presentations in the capital as Lampião, because of his resemblance to the famous bandit (cangaceiro) of the early 1900s. He wants to become a millionaire and return to the Northeast. When he gets involved in a fight, he is hit on the head and travels across time and space to the state of Ceará in the year 1927, where the locals mistake him for Lampião. Taking advantage of this confusion, Virguley begins to act as if he were the real king of cangaço and decides to gather a group to gain power in the town and take advantage of the situation, until he meets the real Virgulino Ferreira da Silva, Lampião.

== Production ==
The series started to be shot in Quixadá, Ceará in November 2021, wrapping in February 2022 in São Paulo. Part of the shoot was made in a mini scenic city still in Quixadá, built for the series due to the COVID-19 pandemic. The project is part of Netflix's Mais Brasil na Tela which brings to the platform more series produced in the country and develops the Brazilian market. Director Gomes said, "It's a joy to bring a cultural and historical icon from the Northeast to the rest of Brazil and the world. The era of these outlaws is an endless source of inspiration, and I've long wanted to create a comedy about this moment in time"

The series will be released in 2022 in 7, 30-minute episodes, with production from GLAZ Entertainment.

In 2022, Expedita Ferreira, daughter of Lampião, sued Netflix, Inc. for not consulting her during the production of Time Hustler.

== Cast and characters ==
Character	Portrayed by
Virguley	Edmilson Filho
Mariá	Chandelly Braz
TBA	Dudu Azevedo
TBA	Max Petterson
TBA	Valéria Vitoriano
TBA	Frank Menezes
TBA	Fábio Lago
TBA	Evaldo Macarrão
TBA	Haroldo Guimarães
TBA	Solange Teixeira
TBA	Carri Costa
TBA	Larissa Goes
TBA	Monique Hortolani
TBA	Mariana Costa
TBA	Mateus Honori
TBA	André Campos
TBA	Roberta Wermont
TBA	Bolachinha
