= Tavares (restaurant) =

Historic restaurant in Lisbon, Portugal

Coordinates: 38.711345°N 9.143161°W

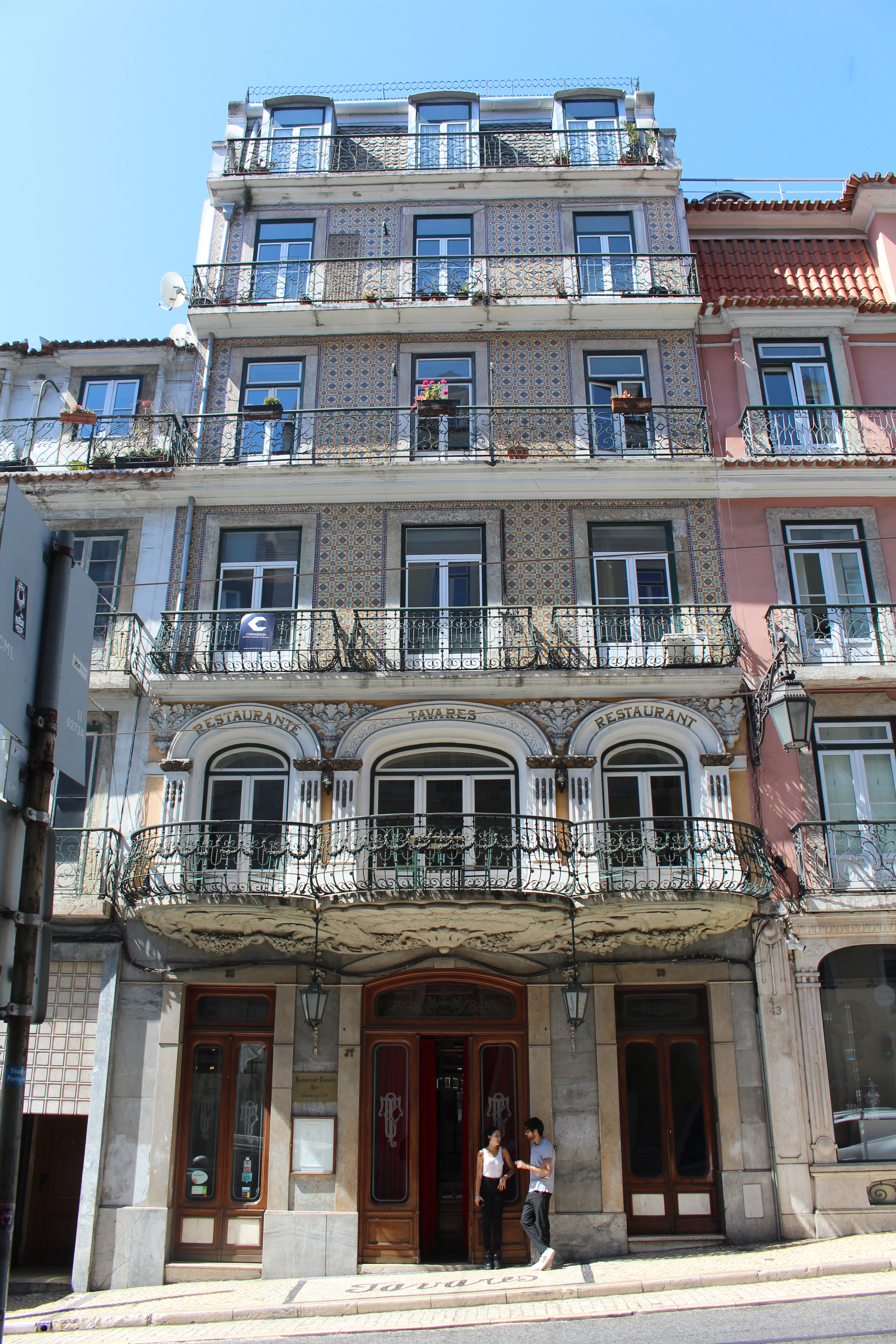
Tavares restaurant, Lisbon, Portugal

The Tavares is a historic restaurant located in Lisbon, Portugal that has operated continuously since 1784. It is the oldest restaurant in Lisbon, having operated in the same location (though not the same building) since this time. It is the second oldest restaurant in the Iberian Peninsula, and has been classified as a national landmark in Portugal.

The restaurant was frequented by writer Eça de Queiroz, who referenced it in his book Os Maias.
