= Farias Brito =

Municipality in Ceará, Brazil

- Municipality
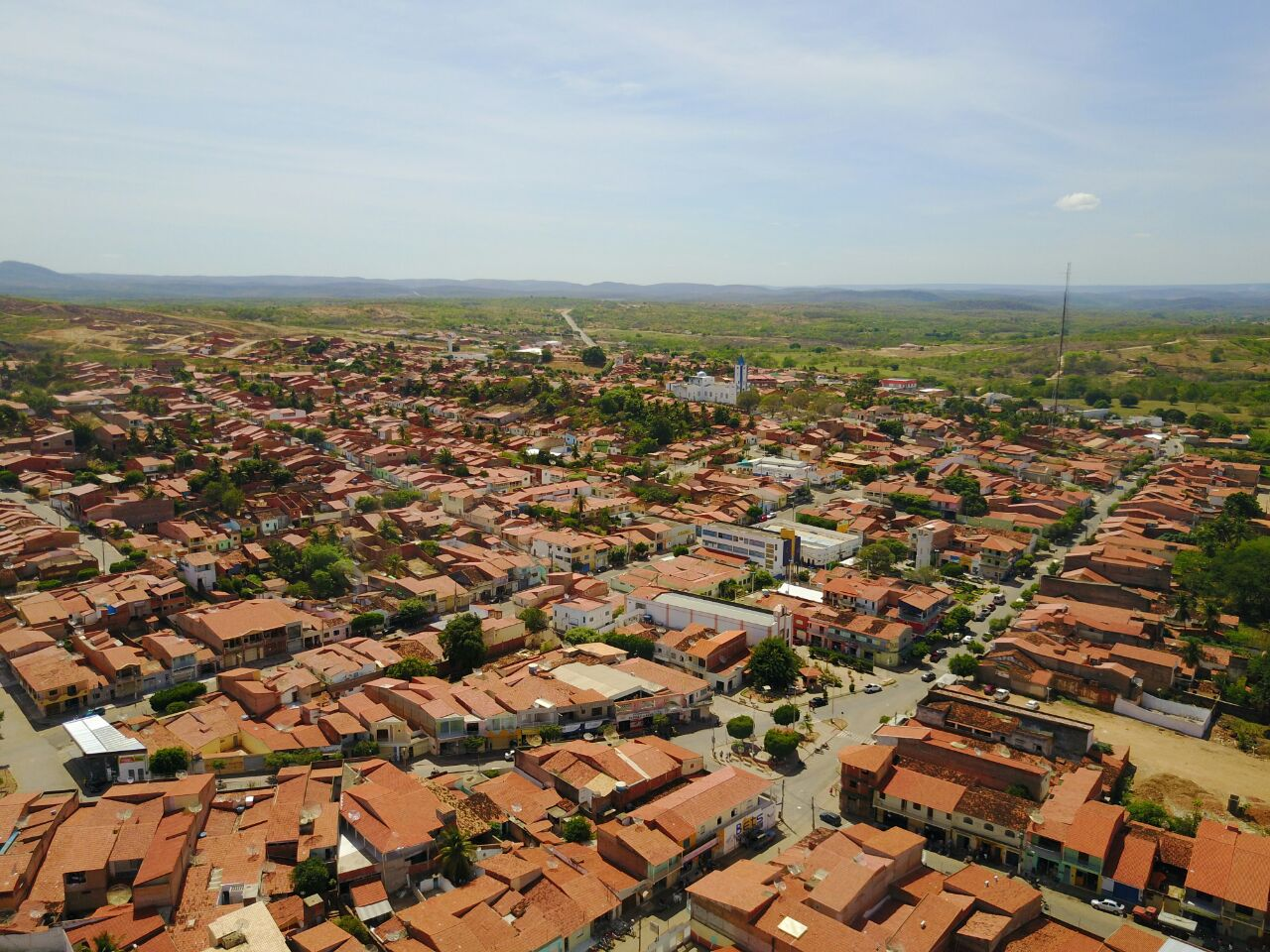

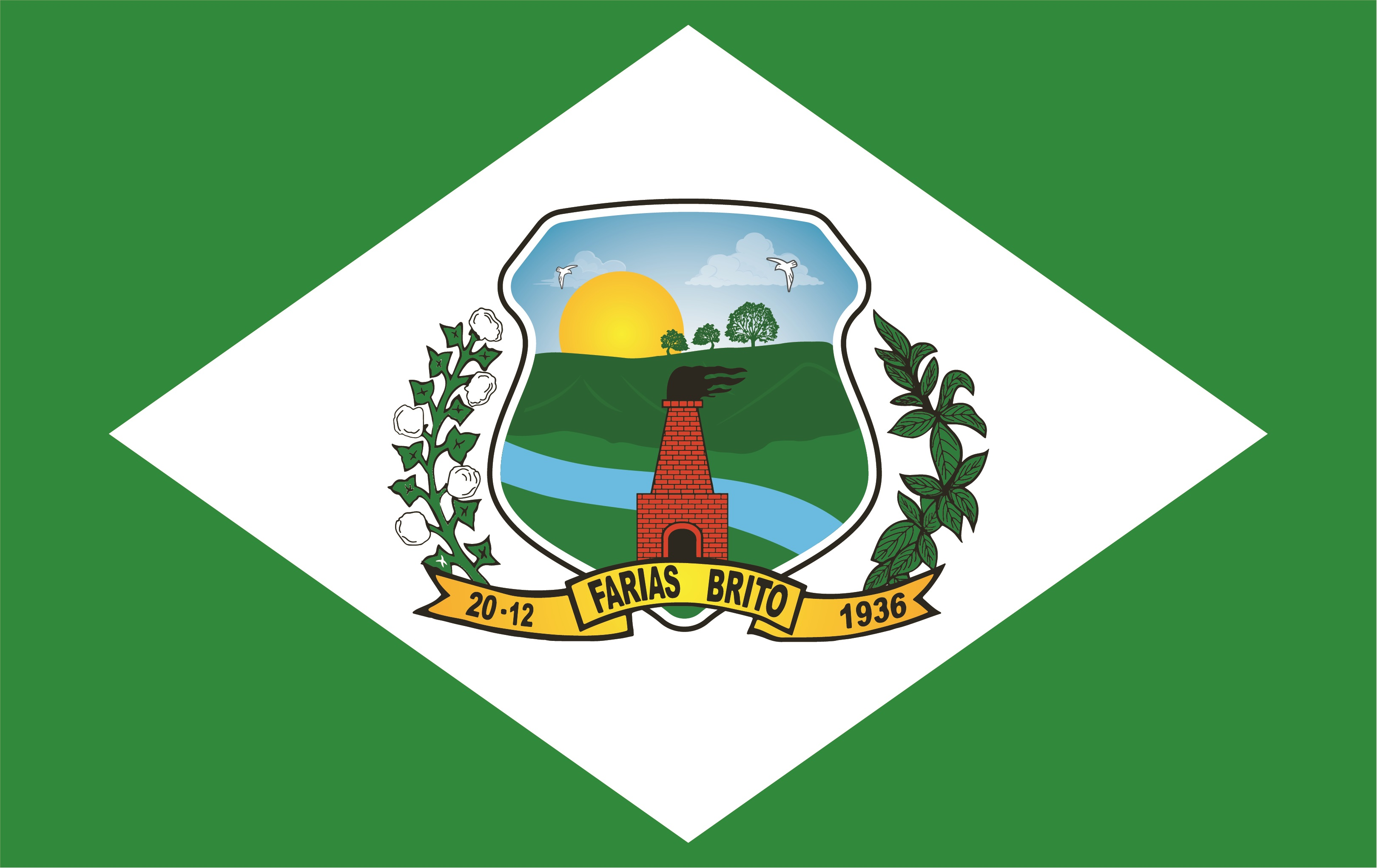
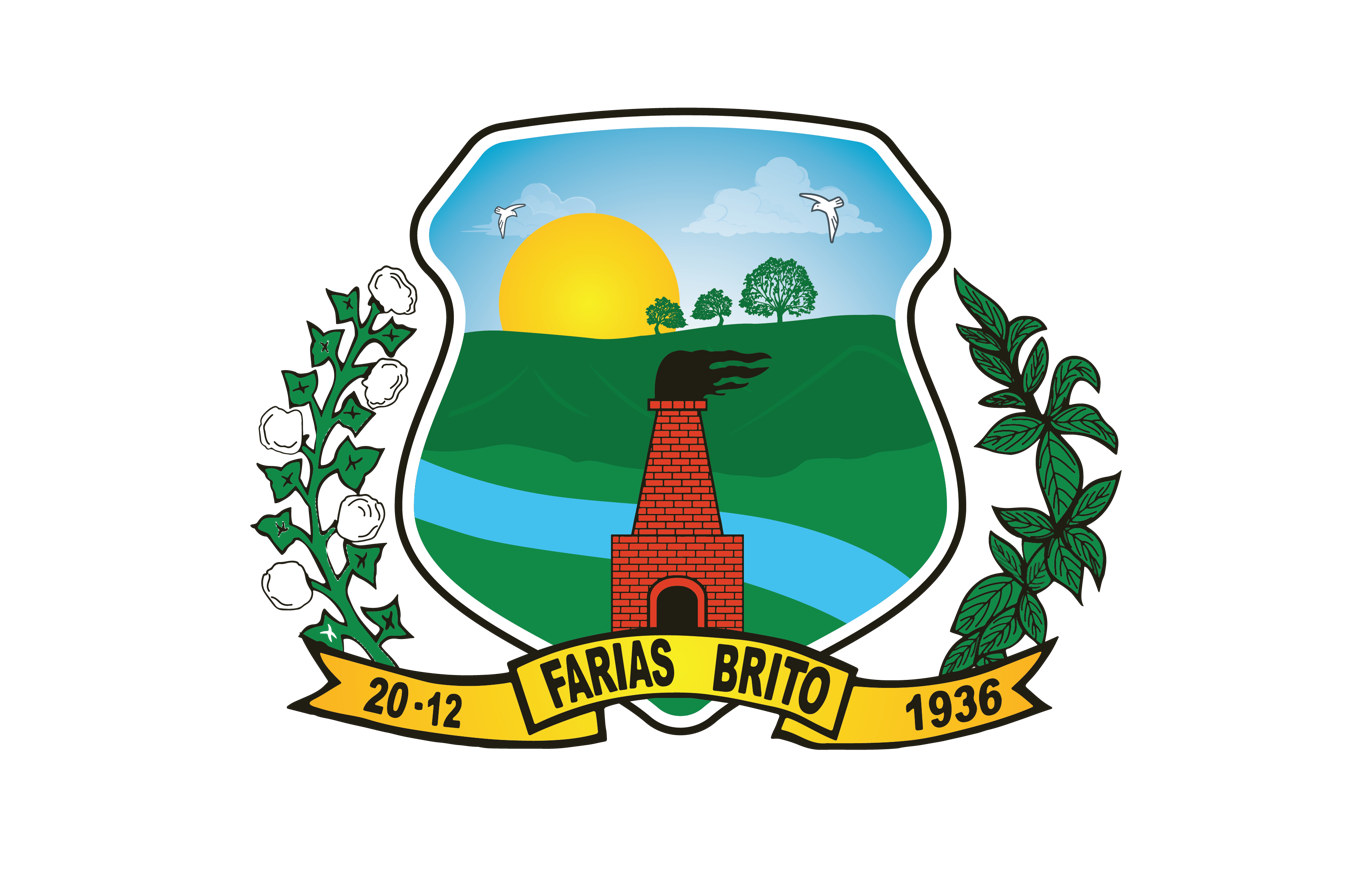
- Flag Coat of arms
- Nickname: A Capital da Cal(The Capital of Quicklime)

- Location in Brazil
- Coordinates: 6°55′38″S 39°34′22″W
- Country: Brazil
- State: Ceará
- Founded: October 13, 1890

Government
  - Type: Mayor
  - Mayor: José Maria Gomes Pereira
  - Vice Mayor: Cleber Mendes

Area
  - Total: 503.622 km^{2} (194.450 sq mi)
- Elevation: 320 m (1,050 ft)

Population (2020)
  - Total: 19,389
- Demonym: Portuguese: Fariasbritense
- Time zone: UTC−3 (BST)
- Postal Code: 63185-000
- Area code: +55 88
- Website: Farias Brito

Farias Brito is a municipality in the state of Ceará in the Northeast region of Brazil.

== See also ==
- List of municipalities in Ceará
