= José Avillez =

Portuguese chef

José de Avillez Burnay Ereira (Lisbon, 24 October 1979), known as José Avillez, is a Portuguese chef and restaurateur. He is one of the most renowned Portuguese chefs. In the beginning of 2012, José Avillez opened the fully renovated Belcanto winning a Michelin star that same year. In 2014, Belcanto earned its second Michelin star and in 2019 was considered one of the 50 best restaurants in the world by The World’s 50 Best Restaurants. Currently, he has several restaurants in Portugal, in Lisbon and Porto, and also in Dubai. His cooking style, contemporary and Portuguese-inspired, has earned him several national and international accolades, including 2015's “Chef of the Year” by WINE magazine.

== Family ==
Son of José Burnay Nunes Ereira (Cascais, 7 November 1950), great-great-grandson of the 1st Count of Burnay, and of his wife, Maria de Fátima Miranda de Avillez (Cascais, 13 October 1952). Brother of Teresa de Avillez Burnay Ereira (Lisbon, 2 April 1978). He is married (2 May 2015) to Sofia Melo de Castro Ulrich (2 May 1975), daughter of Fernando Ulrich.

== Career ==
José Avillez graduated in Business Communication at Instituto Superior de Comunicação Empresarial (ISCEM), with a thesis on the image and identity of Portuguese gastronomy. He began his career at Fortaleza do Guincho restaurant, in Cascais. He worked with José Bento dos Santos, Portugal’s most eminent gastronome, at Quinta do Monte d'Oiro, and took private study lessons with Maria de Lourdes Modesto, the “mother” of Portuguese traditional cooking. After that, he interned in France, with Alain Ducasse and Éric Fréchon. In 2006, he interned in El Bulli and was part of its Creativity Department. That period with Ferran Adrià was a career-changing moment.

In 2005, as the result of his work and of a presentation dinner which he prepared at Hotel Bristol in Paris, he was named "Chef d'Avenir", by the International Academy of Gastronomy, a group of more than 40 representatives of countries from all over the world.

From 2008 to 2011, he was Restaurante Tavares' executive chef, and in 2009 he won his first Michelin star.

== Restaurants ==
In September 2011 he opened the restaurant Cantinho do Avillez, in Chiado, Lisbon.

In January 2012 he inaugurated the restaurant Belcanto, a Portuguese haute cuisine restaurant. During that same year, he accompanied Anthony Bourdain on his visit to film "No Reservations" in Lisbon.

In March 2013 he opened Pizzaria Lisboa. In that same year, in September, he inaugurated Café Lisboa in Largo de São Carlos.

In March 2014 he opened the bar and restaurant Mini Bar, in Teatro São Luiz, in Lisbon. In September of that same year, he inaugurated another Cantinho do Avillez, this time in Porto.

In August 2016 he opened Bairro do Avillez, in Chiado, Lisbon, with different concepts: Mercearia (gourmet deli), Taberna (tavern) and Páteo.

In March 2017 he opened Beco – Cabaret Gourmet, in Bairro do Avillez, in Chiado, offering a dinner-and-a-show.

In July 2017 he opened Cantina Peruana, in Bairro do Avillez, where he presents Peruvian cuisine by the hand of his good friend and world-renowned Peruvian chef, Diego Muñoz.

In December 2017, accepting El Corte Inglés Lisboa's challenge, he developed three different concepts for the Gourmet Experience: Tasca Chic, with Portuguese traditional flavours, Jacaré, a vegetarian carnivore, and Barra Cascabel, with Mexican flavours, in a partnership with chef Roberto Ruiz.

In May 2018, on the date of 1998's Lisbon World Exposition anniversary, he opens Cantinho do Avillez in Parque das Nações (the exhibition's site).

In July 2018 he inaugurates Mini Bar in the city of Porto.

In September 2018 Cantina Peruana moves from Bairro do Avillez to rua de São Paulo, Lisbon .

In March 2019 he opens the Portuguese-Asian restaurant Rei da China, in Chiado, Lisbon, a partnership with Argentinian chef Estanislao Carenzo.

Still in March 2019, he inaugurates his first international restaurant project, Tasca, at the 5 star hotel Mandarin Oriental Jumeira, in Dubai.

In May 2019, after its success in Chiado, Parque das Nações and Porto, Cantinho do Avillez opens in Cascais.

In January 2020, in co-authorship with Ana Moura and António Zambujo, José Avillez opens Canto, offering a Portuguese-inspired menu followed by a musical performance.

In May 2020, due to the effects of the Covid-19 pandemic in the restaurant and tourism sectors, José Avillez reorganizes his restaurants by definitively closing down some and adapting those that remain open to the new national and international realities. Belcanto, Bairro do Avillez - with Taberna, Páteo, Mini Bar and Pizzaria Lisboa – Cantinho do Avillez in Lisbon, Cascais, Parque das Nações and Porto, and the three restaurants at the Gourmet Experience of El Corte Inglés Lisboa – Tasca Chic, Jacaré and Barra Cascabel – reopen its doors. Beco, Café Lisboa, Cantina Peruana, Canto, Rei da China and Casa dos Prazeres close; in Porto, Mini Bar also closes down.

In March 2022, opens Encanto, in Lisbon.

In April 2023, he finally gave his signature to the Mesa restaurant, in Macau, China, after the restaurant had opened years before, but due to impossibility due to the Covid-19 pandemic, he was never present at its opening.

== Accolades ==
2021

- Belcanto is considered one of the world’s 50 best restaurants by the prestigious “The World’s 50 Best Restaurants” coming in at #42.
- José Avillez is considered the 44th best by “The Best Chef Awards”.

2020

- José Avillez is considered the 70th best by “The Best Chef Awards”.

2019

- Belcanto is the world's 42nd best restaurant according to "The World's 50 Best Restaurants".

2018

- José Avillez is named "Chef of the Year" and Belcanto receives a "Platinum Fork" for the 2018 edition of the Boa Cama, Boa Mesa awards.
- Belcanto comes in seventy-fifth place in "The World's 50 Best Restaurant's List" organized by Restaurant magazine.
- José Avillez is distinguished with the International Academy of Gastronomy's greatest award, the Grand Prix de l'Art de la Cuisine.

2017

- Belcanto comes in eighty-fifth place in the W50B list organized by Restaurant magazine.
- Belcanto is awarded a "Gold Fork" by the guide Boa Cama, Boa Mesa by Expresso newspaper.

2016

- Belcanto receives the “Best International Restaurant” award by Condé Nast Traveller International.
- The guide Boa Cama Boa Mesa by Expresso newspaper awards Belcanto the "Gold Fork".
- The prestigious gastronomic blog Mesa Marcada names José Avillez 2015's “Chef of the Year” and Belcanto 2015's “Restaurant of the Year”.
- Belcanto receives the “Gastronomic Restaurant of 2015” award from WINE magazine.

2015

- Belcanto is elected one of the 100 best restaurants in the world by the prestigious W50B list and came in ninety-first place.
- The 2015 Repsol Guide gives Belcanto three Repsol suns and Mini Bar and Cantinho do Avillez (Lisbon and Porto) one Repsol sun.
- José Avillez is awarded the prize “Gastronomia David Lopes Ramos 2014” by Revista de Vinhos magazine.
- José Avillez is given the “Chef of the Year” award by WINE magazine.
- The guide Boa Cama, Boa Mesa by Expresso newspaper awards Belcanto the "Gold Fork".

2014

- Belcanto is awarded its second Michelin star.
- The 2014 Repsol Guide gives Belcanto three Repsol suns.
- The Boa Cama, Boa Mesa guide by Expresso newspaper awards Belcanto the "Gold Fork".
- The prestigious gastronomic blog Mesa Marcada elects José Avillez as 2013's “Chef of the Year” and Belcanto as 2013's “Restaurant of the Year”.

2013

- The Boa Cama, Boa Mesa guide by Expresso newspaper elects José Avillez “Chef of the Year”.
- The Boa Cama, Boa Mesa guide by Expresso newspaper awards Belcanto the "Platinum Fork", the highest honour given by this guide.
- Belcanto is nominated for the first annual "Foodie Top 100 Restaurants: Europe, UK & Asia Pacific list".
- Belcanto is awarded three Repsol suns by 2014's Repsol Guide.

2012

- Belcanto is awarded a Michelin star.

== Television, Radio and Press ==
José Avillez hosted the television show “Combinações ImProváveis” (“Improbabilicious”), which aired on SIC Mulher channel. Previously, he hosted three seasons of the show “JA ao Lume,” that also aired on SIC Mulher.

From 2014 to 2016, he hosted a morning radio show in “Manhãs da Rádio Comercial” entitled “O Chef Sou Eu” ("I’m the Chef"), where he suggested recipes, shared cooking tips and talked about gastronomy-related fun facts.

He’s a frequent guest on television and radio shows, and he’s the author of a weekly recipe for Revista E, a magazine that’s part of Expresso newspaper.

In 2019 José Avillez is one of the Masters in the cooking competition "Mestre do Sabor", by TV Globo Brazil.

== Books ==
After 2014 and 2016's success, José Avillez returned in 2020 to Radio Comercial with the same segment, suggesting recipes and challenging listeners to DIY them.

In 2006 José Avillez launched his first book Um Chef em Sua Casa (A Chef in Your Home), one of the bestselling books in Portugal that year, with over 15 000 copies sold, also published in Brazil.

In 2011 he published Petiscar com Estilo (Snacking in Style), a multilingual edition that gathers typical Portuguese appetizers. That same year, he contributed for the book A Boy After the Sea 2, by Kevin Snook, alongside Heston Blumenthal, Thomas Keller, and Daniel Boulu.

In 2013 José Avillez went back to writing with Cantinho do Avillez – The Recipes, a bilingual edition, a book in which he shares some of the most successful recipes of this restaurant.

In 2015 he published the book Receitas Leves (Light Recipes) along with Expresso newspaper.

In 2016 he published the book Combinações ImProváveis, a bilingual edition, which compiles the recipes featured on the TV show.

Besides his own books, José Avillez also contributed for several other publications, such as the book COCO, by chef Ferran Adrià, or Where Chef’s Eat, by food critic Joe Warwick.
