= Halder Gomes =

Brazilian filmmaker

- Born: 15 February 1967 (age 59); Ceará, Brazil
- Occupations: Filmmaker, Director, Producer
- Years active: 2004-present
- Known for: Filmmaking
- Notable work: No Calor da Terra da Sol (Sunland Heat)

Halder Catunda Gomes (born 15 February 1967) is a Brazilian filmmaker, director, producer and martial artist.

== Biography ==
Born in the capital of Ceará, he spent his childhood in Senador Pompeu. He has a degree in business administration at the Federal University of Fortaleza.

In 1984, Gomes started exchange program in Drayton Plains, Michigan where he took his first taekwondo class. In 1991, he moved to Los Angeles to start acting as a stunt for Art Camacho, where he started taking small tips in film direction. In 2004, after working as a stunt, Gomes decided to direct his first movie in Fortaleza. For the film script, Gomes went to the art school and placed a note saying that he was "looking for a writer" for an action/martial arts film. After having the project being fund by local tax incentive program, Sunland Heat: No Calor da Terra do Sol" premiered in local cinemas.

With a major success with his films, Gomes directed in 2004 the short "Cine Holiúdy – the Good Guy Against the Bad Guy", that later lead for his feature film "Cine Holiúdy". In 2008, co-directed the horror film "The Morgue" along Gerson Sanginitto.

After the good experience with "Cine Holiúdy", Gomes returned to the backlands of the ceára in November 2020 to shoot the film "Bem-vinda a Quixeramobim", which will premiere at the 24th Festival du Cinéma Brésilien de Paris on April 3, 2022.

Expected for the second semester of 2022, Gomes directed and wrote the series "O Cangaceiro do Futuro" project from Netflix's "Mais Brasil na Tela".

== Personal life ==
He holds a black belt in Taekwondo and before becoming a renowned film director, he owned a dojang (a martial arts school focused on Taekwondo) and was a stuntman.

== Filmography ==
=== Cinema ===
| Ano | Título | Notas |
|---|---|---|
| 2022 | Bem-vinda a Quixeramobim | |
| 2018 | Cine Holliúdy 2: A Chibata Sidereal | |
| 2017 | Os Parças | |
| 2016 | Shaolin do Sertão | |
| 2012 | Cine Holliúdy | |
| 2011 | As Mães de Chico Xavier | Codirected with Glauber Filho |
| 2008 | The Morgue | |
| 2004 | Sunland Heat – No Calor da Terra do Sol | |
