= Claude Troisgros =

French chef (born 1956)

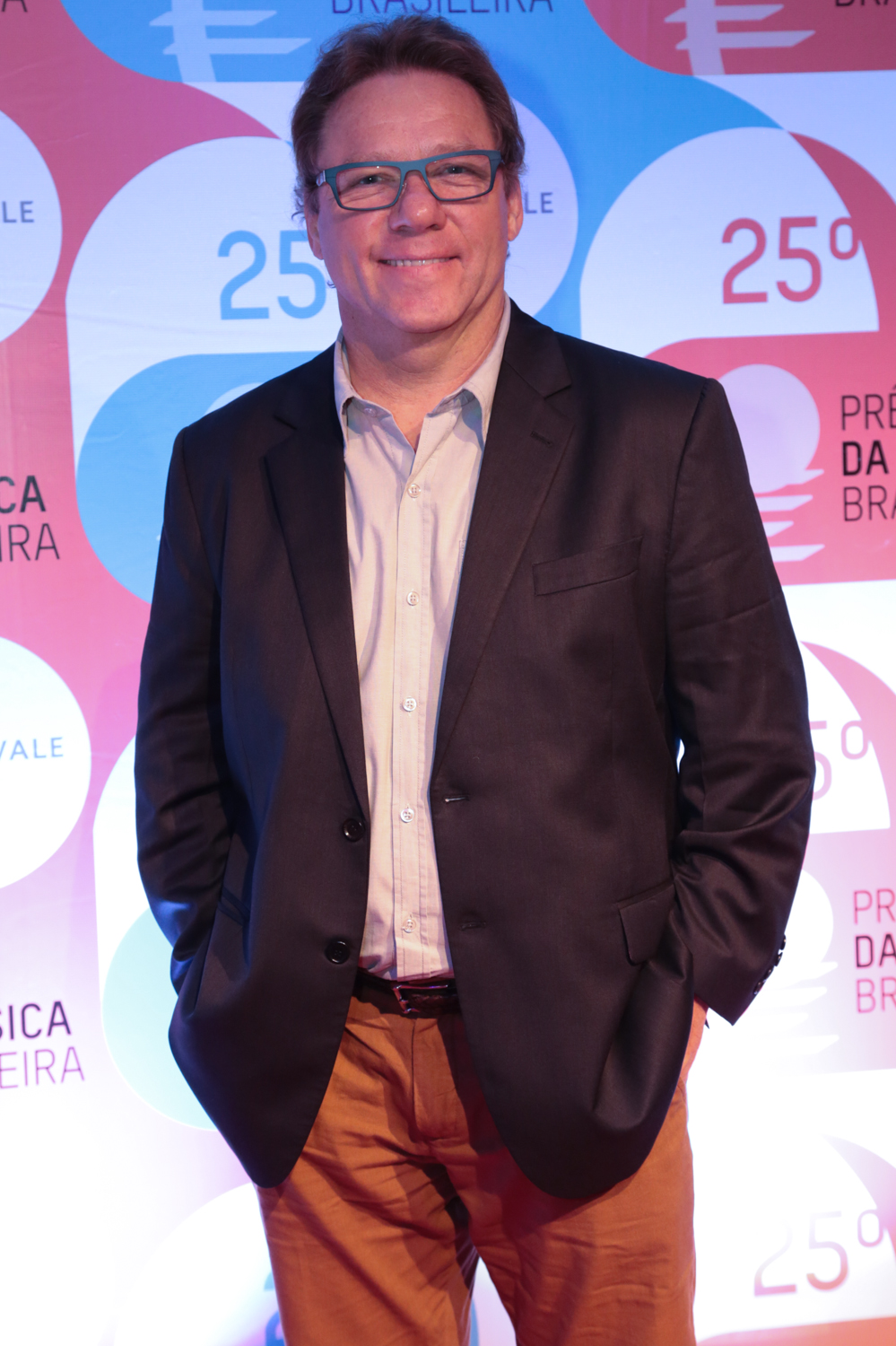
- Born: 9 April 1956 (age 70); Roanne, Loire, France
- Occupation: Chef

Claude Troisgros (born 9 April 1956) is a French chef who lives in Rio de Janeiro, Brazil. He is the son of the famous chef Pierre Troisgros, who with his brother Jean were among a group of French chefs who pioneered nouvelle cuisine in the 1970s, influenced by Fernand Point.

== Career ==
Claude Troisgros runs four restaurants in Rio de Janeiro, Olympe and 66 Bistrô, CT Brasserie and CT Boucherie. In the US, he was part-owner of the restaurant Caviar & Banana in New York City, and he is Executive Chef/Consultant at Blue Door Restaurant at the Delano Hotel in Miami. 66 Bistrô was recently closed in order to open another CT Boucherie location.

Troisgros is a celebrity chef in Brazil, where he presents his own TV show Que Marravilha! on the GNT cable channel. The TV show has a magazine format, with recipes, reality show features, and travelogue pieces.

== Filmography ==
Year	Title	Role	Broadcaster
2010–present	Que Marravilha!	Host	GNT
2015–present	Que Marravilha! Chefinhos	Host	GNT
2015–present	The Taste Brasil	Host	GNT
2019–present	Mestre do Sabor	Host	Rede Globo

== See also ==
- Troisgros family
