= Monique Alfradique =

Brazilian actress (born 1986)

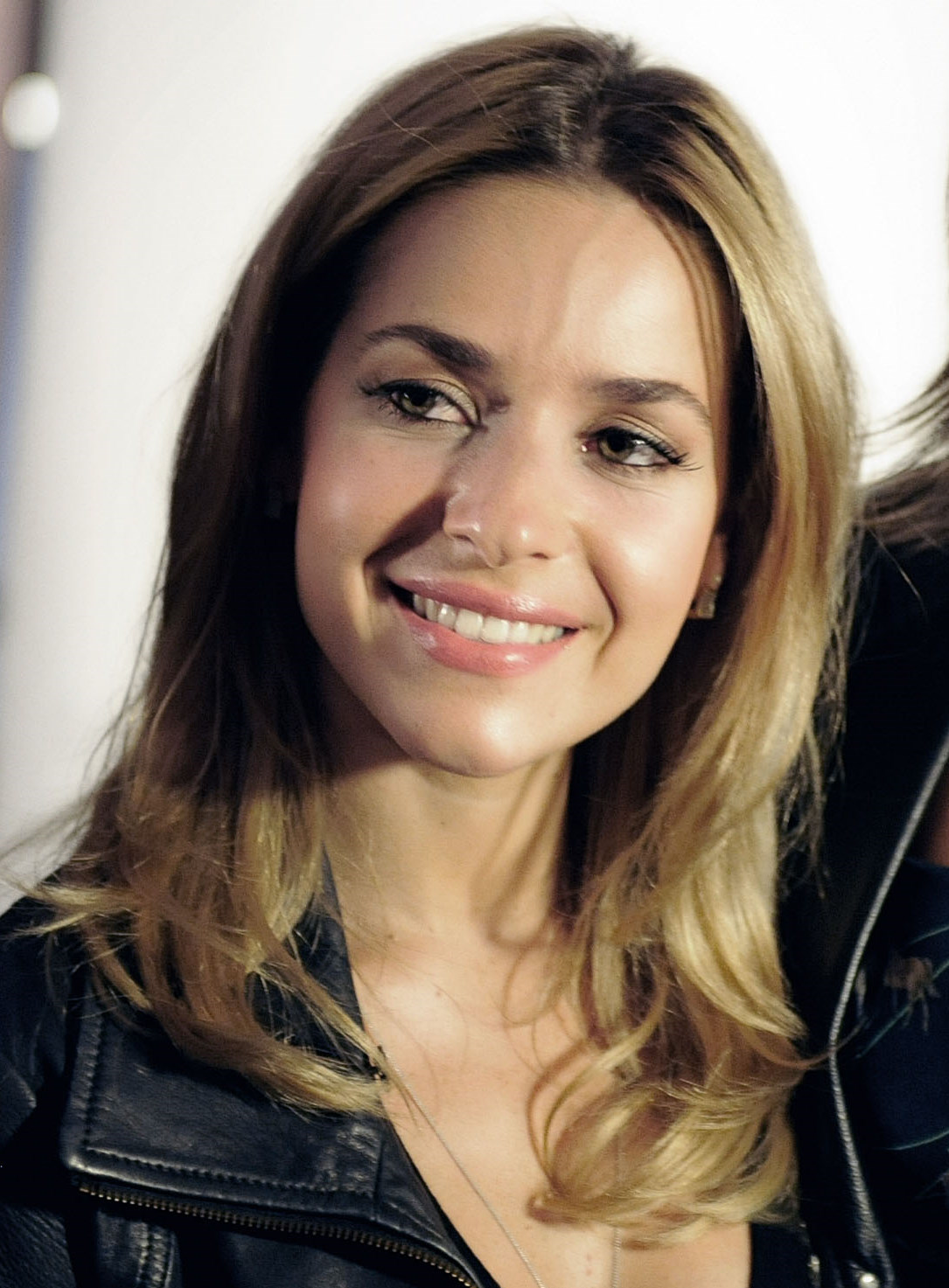
- Alfradique at São Paulo Fashion Week in 2011
- Born: April 29, 1986 (age 40); Niterói, Rio de Janeiro, Brazil
- Occupation: Actress
- Years active: 1996–present
- Height: 1.60 m (5 ft 3 in)
- Website: www.moniquealfradique.com

Monique de Araújo Alfradique (born April 29, 1986) is a Brazilian actress.

== Biography ==
Monique was born in Niterói, Rio de Janeiro, Brazil on April 29, 1986. Her desire to become an actress began with children's theater and advertising campaigns.

== Career ==
She began her career on a television show for kids, aired by TV Globo called, Xuxa. She was on the show from 1999 to 2002.

After appearing in Malhação and Agora É que São Elas, two Brazilian series, she got the leading role in the Brazilian soap opera A Lua Me Disse. In 2004, together with Giselle Policarpo, she starred in the André Prado comedic film Loucuras a Dois.

In 2006, while working on the play "A Mentira" by the Brazilian playwright, Nelson Rodrigues, she was offered the starring role in the television show Malhação, as the villainous Priscilla. She worked on the show for a year and a half, and then moved on to play Fernanda in another TV Globo soap opera, Beleza Pura. She later relocated to São Paulo to perform in the Shakespearean play The Comedy of Errors.

In 2009, she participated in the miniseries Cinquentinha, where she played Barbara Romero, granddaughter of the character of Susana Vieira. Also in 2009, she participated in Cama de Gato, where she played the young doctor Erica Castiglione, granddaughter of Berta Loran character.

In 2011, she again played Barbara Romero in the series Lara com Z, Cinquentinha a second season, and was on display with The School for Wives written by Molière.

Monique took pictures of the Dança no Gelo and Desafio do Faustão in Domingão do Faustão, Rede Globo, where she won the challenge to parade for all the 14 samba schools in São Paulo. In addition, Monique participated in the 2008 video for the song "Alguém que te faz sorrir", the band Fresno.

Currently airing in this soap opera Fina Estampa.

== Filmography ==
=== Television ===
Year	Títle	Role	Notes
1996	Vira Lata	Child	Cameo
1999	Xuxa Park	Paquita	(1999-2002)
2001	Planeta Xuxa	Dique	
2003	Agora É que São Elas	Patrícia	Cameo
2003	Malhação	Natália	Cameo
2004	Xuxa no Mundo da Imaginação	Gata Mia	"As Aventuras do Txutxucão"
2005	A Lua Me Disse	Branca Sá Marques	
2006	Dança no Gelo	Herself	Reality show of Domingão do Faustão
2006	Malhação	Priscila Bittencourt	(2006-2007)
2008	Beleza Pura	Fernanda Brito	
2008	Casos e Acasos	Gabriela	Ep: "O Celular, a Viagem e o Dia Seguinte"
2009	Cinquentinha	Bárbara Romero	
2009	Cama de Gato	Érica Castiglione	Cameo
2010	A Princesa e o Vagabundo	Léia	Special of Rede Globo
2010	Na Forma da Lei	Nininha Mourão	Cameo
2011	Lara com Z	Bárbara Romero	
2011	Fina Estampa	Beatriz Lobo	
2012	Dança dos Famosos 9	Herself	Reality show of Domingão do Faustão
2012	Casseta & Planeta Vai Fundo	Princess Kate Middleton	Cameo
2013	Didi, O Peregrino	Rebeca	Cameo
2014	A Segunda Vez	Luíza	
2015	PartiuShopping	Perla	
2015	A Regra do Jogo	Tina	
2016	A Secretária do Presidente	Ilde de Souza Pinto	
2017	A Cara do Pai	Lorena	Episode: "Cachimbo de Paz"
2017	A Vila	Isabela	
2018	Deus Salve o Rei	Glória	
2018	Além da Ilha	Sheila	
2018	Pais de Primeira	Patrícia Siqueira Rodrigues	
2019	A Dona do Pedaço	Yohana Rezende	Cameo
2020	Mestre do Sabor	Presenter	
2021	Festa É Festa	Júlia Silva	
2023	Batalha do Lip Sync	Contestant	Season 2
2023	Elas por Elas	Érica	
2024	5x Comédia	Brunielle Fraci dos Santos	Episode: "Mal Me Quer"
2025	Crush Animal	Presenter	
2025	Êta Mundo Melhor!	Tamires	

=== Film ===
Year	Title	Role	Notes
1999	Xuxa Requebra	Pupil	Cameo
2001	Xuxa e os Duendes	Fairy	Cameo
2004	Loucuras a Dois	Bruna	
2005	Oi, Meu Amor	Bela	Short film
2016	Rodízio - O Filme		Short film
2016	Turbulência	Ágatha	
2017	Ninguém Entra, Ninguém Sai	Dra. Severine	
2018	Crô em Família	Carlota Valdez	
2019	Chorar de Rir	Bárbara	
2019	O Amor Dá Trabalho	Fernanda Kelsey	
2019	Osmar, a Primeira Fatia do Pão de Forma	Josie	Voice role
2020	Virando a Mesa	Nina	
2021	O Buscador	Sabrina	
2021	Reação em Cadeia	Lara	
2022	Welcome to Quixeramobim	Aimée	
2022	Um Natal Cheio de Graça	Bebela	
2023	Meu Cunhado é um Vampiro	Vanessa	

=== Music videos ===
Year	Title	Artist
2009	"Alguém Que Te Faz Sorrir"	Fresno
2013	"Perto de Mim"	Thaeme e Thiago
2017	"Forró e Paixão"	Eduardo Costa
2019	"Olha Como Está a Minha Mesa"	Léo Santana

=== Internet ===
Year	Title	Role
2014	Ato Falho	Various

=== Theater ===
Year	Title
1997	Os Bastidores
1998	Eu acredito em duende
2001	O incrível mundo da imaginação
2002	Juventude
2003	Dálmatas
2004	Fama: o Musical
2005	Os Incríveis Anos 60
2006	A Mentira
2007	Lembranças de um Sonho
2009	A Comédia dos Erros
2010	Mordendo os Lábios
2011	Escola de Mulheres
2012	A Garota do Biquini Vermelho
2012	Pirou?
2014	Qualquer Gato Vira-Lata
2019	Como Ter uma Vida Quase Normal
