= Constitution (disambiguation) =

A constitution is the highest laws of a sovereign state, a federated state, a country or other polity.

Constitution or constitutional may also refer to:

== Politics, regulation, and law ==
- Constitution (corporate), the regulations governing the affairs of a legal person
- Constitution (Roman law), a legislative enactment of a Roman emperor
- Apostolic constitution, a level of decree issued by a Pope
- Apostolic Constitutions, a collection of Early Christian canon law
- Constitution of the United States, oldest written and codified national constitution still in force

== Ships and vehicles ==
- HMS Constitution, a schooner purchased by the British Royal Navy in 1835
- SS Constitution, a passenger ship, commissioned in 1951
- USS Constitution, the oldest commissioned warship afloat in the world
- USS Constitution (CC-5), a battlecruiser canceled when partially complete in 1923
- Space Shuttle Enterprise or Constitution
- R6V Constitution, a US Navy aircraft built by Lockheed

== Places ==
- Constitution, Ohio, a community in the United States
- Constitution Island, part of the United States Military Academy at West Point
- The Constitution (pub), a pub in Camden Town, London

== Other uses ==
- The Constitution (film), 2016 Croatian film
- The Constitution, a former weekly newspaper in Connecticut
- "Constitution", a song by Badfinger
- Constitution (horse), a racehorse
- Constitution, a player statistic in Dungeons & Dragons

== See also ==
- British Constitution (solitaire), a card game
- Constitución (disambiguation)
- Constitution theory
- List of national constitutions
