= State constitution =

State constitution may refer to:

- State constitution (Australia)
- State constitution (United States)
- the constitution of any constituent state within a federation, confederation or some other composite polity

== See also ==
- State (disambiguation)
- Constitution (disambiguation)
- Federated state
- Confederated state
