= Executive Order (film) =

2020 film by Lázaro Ramos

- Theatrical release poster
- Portuguese: Medida Provisória
- Directed by: Lázaro Ramos
- Screenplay by: Lusa Silvestre; Lázaro Ramos; Aldri Anunciação; Elísio Lopes Jr.
- Based on: Namibia, no! by Aldri Anunciação
- Produced by: Daniel Filho; Tania Rocha
- Starring: Alfred Enoch; Taís Araújo; Seu Jorge; Adriana Esteves
- Cinematography: Adrian Teijido
- Edited by: Diana Vasconcellos
- Music by: Plínio Profeta; Rincon Sapiência; Kiko de Souza
- Production companies: Lereby Produções; Lata Filmes; Globo Filmes; Melanina Acentuada
- Distributed by: Elo Company; H2O Films
- Release dates: 3 October 2020 (Moscow); 14 April 2022 (Brazil)
- Running time: 103 minutes
- Country: Brazil
- Language: Portuguese

Executive Order (Portuguese: Medida Provisória, lit. 'Provisional Measure') is a 2020 Brazilian dystopian drama film directed by Lázaro Ramos (in his feature directorial debut), based on the stage play Namibia, no! by Aldri Anunciação.

The film had its world premiere at the Moscow International Film Festival on 3 October 2020, and was screened at the Indie Memphis Film Fest on 20 October 2020 and at the South by Southwest Film Festival on 20 March 2021. It was released theatrically in Brazil on 14 April 2022.

== Plot ==
Near future in Brazil. After Capitu, a doctor, and Antônio, a lawyer, sue the authoritarian Brazilian government for compensation for the descendants of African slaves once brought to the country, they and all other Black citizens are to be sent to Africa. This outrageous order is followed by a hunt for Black citizens who are exiled to Africa against their will.

While the army and the police enforce the law, Antônio sends his uncle to go in search of the doctor, who has joined a resistance movement. From the background and underground, they fight together against the madness that has spread in the country, triggering a resistance that inspires the nation.

== Cast ==
- Alfred Enoch as Antônio
- Taís Araújo as Capitu
- Seu Jorge as André
- Adriana Esteves as Isabel
- Renata Sorrah as Dona Izildinha
- Mariana Xavier as Sara
- Emicida as Berto
- Aldri Anunciação as Ivan
- Pablo Sanábio as Santiago
- Flávio Bauraqui as Kabenguele
- Hilton Cobra as Gaspar
- Paulo Chun as Kaito
- William Russell

== Soundtrack ==
Track listing
No.	Title	Performer(s)	Length
1.	"Primeiro Volante (Verso Livre)"	Rincon Sapiência
2.	"Te Amo Disgraça"	Baco Exu do Blues
3.	"O Guarani (Abertura)"	Antônio Carlos Gomes, Marco Bernardo
4.	"Dura Na Queda"	Elza Soares
5.	"Zero"	Liniker e os Caramelows
6.	"Breu"	Xênia França
7.	"Preciso Me Encontrar"	Carlota
8.	"O Que Se Cala"	Elza Soares
9.	"Tua"	Liniker e os Caramelows
10.	"Queima Minha Pele"	Baco Exu do Blues, Tim Bernardes
11.	"Se Avexe Não"	Tassia Reis
12.	"Caeu"	Liniker e os Caramelows
13.	"Flamingos"	Baco Exu do Blues, Tuyo
14.	"O Jeito"	Flora Matos
