= The Runner (2026 film) =

2026 British film by Kevin Macdonald

- Release poster
- Directed by: Kevin Macdonald
- Written by: Mark Gibson
- Produced by: David Kosse
- Starring: Gal Gadot; Damian Lewis; Alfred Enoch
- Cinematography: Anthony Dod Mantle
- Edited by: Sam Rice-Edwards
- Music by: Tom Hodge
- Production company: Rockwood Pictures
- Distributed by: Amazon MGM Studios (via Prime Video) (Note: Released through the Metro-Goldwyn-Mayer banner.)
- Release date: 2 September 2026
- Running time: 84 minutes
- Country: United Kingdom
- Language: English

The Runner is a 2026 British action thriller film directed by Kevin Macdonald from a screenplay by Mark Gibson starring Gal Gadot, Damian Lewis, and Alfred Enoch. Prosecuting attorney Maia Martin is cryptically commanded by an unknown caller to race through London to prevent a star witness from testifying, in order to save her abducted son.

The film was released on Amazon Prime Video on 2 September 2026. It was panned by critics.

== Plot ==
Maia Marten is a prosecutor and mother to her diabetic son Noah, living in London. On the day she is scheduled to appear in court for the trial of crime boss Tommy Boyd, she drops Noah off at school, then goes for a run. While on her run, she receives a call coming from Noah's phone from an unnamed man in Boyd's employ. (Note: The character is not named in the film, but is credited as "The Caller".)

The Caller informs Maia that he has kidnapped Noah and orders her to follow his instructions to ensure Noah’s safe release. He also reveals that he has hacked her phone and is tracking her, leaving her unable to call others for help. The Caller guides Maia to a dumpster, where she finds Noah's backpack containing a gun that was used by Boyd.

The Caller tells Maia he has placed Noah in a diabetic coma using his insulin pump. He instructs her to run to the Excelsus Hotel, where key witness Radian Tafa is being kept under police guard, and use the gun to kill him, telling her that if she does not succeed within one hour, Noah will die.

Maia begins to run, still on the phone with the Caller, who taunts her with private information he has learned from hacking her, as well as her colleague and romantic interest Ted. She attempts to steal a phone from passersby to send a text to Ted but is unable to do so. As the Caller interrogates Maia about her father's murder, allegedly committed by her abused mother, she is struck by a car and awakens several minutes later in an ambulance.

Leaping out, Maia enters the London Underground to make up time, against the Caller's orders. While disembarking her train, she loses contact with the Caller, realizing her phone has been pickpocketed. Maia races the train to the next station and confronts the thief, threatening him with her gun, which attracts the attention of police and forces her to escape through an Underground tunnel. When she exits the Underground, she is confronted by police searching for her but escapes by hiding in a nearby church.

Maia re-establishes contact with the Caller, who now plans to kill Tafa himself with a bomb. She tells him that she was the one who murdered her father, using a pistol she used for target shooting. The Caller gives her 15 minutes to get to the hotel and shoot Tafa.

After being recognized by a police officer while crossing Waterloo Bridge, she leaps off the bridge onto a passing barge, then jumps from the ship onto a jetty near the HMS Belfast. She arrives at the hotel and heads to Tafa's 53rd-floor suite, where she shoots him several times as the Caller watches. The Caller, who is several floors above at the hotel, pulls a fire alarm and departs. Maia reaches Noah and gives him a dose of glucagon to revive him.

In the lobby, Maia is met by a police detective, who informs her that the Caller is still nearby but does not arrest her. Noah spots the Caller through a window, disguised as a paramedic, but Maia cannot reach him as the hotel is locked down. He smugly confronts her, only to notice a still-living Tafa being escorted out by police.

It is revealed that Maia used a stranger's phone on the Underground and her lipstick to send word to Ted and the police about the situation. The police arranged for her to be given blanks and for Tafa's murder to be faked using blood packs. As Maia admits she is not a killer, she fires a blank at the Caller, alerting police to his location. He accepts defeat as he is arrested and his bomb is defused. Boyd is convicted with the help of Tafa's testimony. As Maia and Noah are driven home, Maia receives a call from an unknown number and tosses her phone out of the car instead of answering.

== Cast ==
- Gal Gadot as Maia Marten
- Damian Lewis as The Caller
- Alfred Enoch as Ted
- Rory Wilmot as Noah Marten
- Phoenix Di Sebastiani as Radian Tafa

== Production ==
In November 2024, Amazon MGM Studios was developing an action thriller film titled The Runner with Kevin Macdonald directing, Mark Gibson writing the script, and Gal Gadot starring. Principal photography began on 22 April 2025, in London and wrapped filming around early July 2025.

London locations lensed include: Regent's Canal and St Pancras Way, in the London Borough of Camden; Kentish Town; Canary Wharf; Covent Garden; and Hampstead Heath. Some filming was on unclosed live streets, with real crowds and hidden cameras.

The setting of Maia's route begins around Hampstead Heath, to Kentish Town, then along Regent's Canal, then down St Pancras Way, then toward King's Cross, London, and London King's Cross railway station. Later, in The City of London, sites include: Watling Street, Coleman Street, and King's Arms Yard. Later, in Canary Wharf and around the Thames river: Millennium Bridge, Waterloo Bridge and HMS Belfast.

Through April and May 2025, eight pro-Palestinian protesters in total were arrested for disrupting the Central London set of the film. The film's production schedule, however, was not affected. The Metropolitan Police stated in a news release that the demonstrations were “solely because an actress involved in the production is Israeli." Gadot, who previously served in the IDF for two years, has been described as "vocal in her support of Israel". In November 2025, the case was discontinued and all charges against the protesters were dropped as the Crown Prosecution Service and Met Police decided the evidence did not meet the evidentiary threshold for a prosecution.

== Release ==
The Runner was released on Amazon Prime Video on 2 September 2026.

== Reception ==
=== Viewership ===
The Runner debuted at No. 2 on the worldwide Prime Video movie chart and ranked among the top 10 in several European countries and Canada. It reached No. 1 in the United Kingdom and the United States, surpassing films including Project Hail Mary, Masters of the Universe, and Icefall. Streaming analytics firm FlixPatrol, which monitors daily updated VOD charts and streaming ratings worldwide, reported that the film ranked first in 38 countries by September 4, two days after its release, and continued to appear among the top-ranked titles in more than 50 territories. During the week of September 7–13, The Runner ranked No. 2 on Prime Video's list of the most-watched English-language films, behind Drawn Together. On September 18, the film also ranked No. 2 on Prime Video's charts in the United States and worldwide. TVision, which tracks viewer attention, program reach, and engagement across more than 1,000 CTV apps, announced that The Runner was the second most-streamed film in the United States during September 2026.

Nielsen Media Research, which records streaming viewership on certain U.S. television screens, reported that The Runner was the fourth most-streamed film between August 31 and September 6, with 368 million minutes viewed. The following week, from September 7–13, the film recorded 201 million minutes of watch time, ranking tenth. Luminate, which measures streaming performance in the United States using viewership data, audience engagement metrics, and content reach across multiple platforms, reported that The Runner generated 8.6 million views over its first ten days of release.

=== Critical response ===
On the review aggregator website Rotten Tomatoes, 11% of 56 critics' reviews are positive, with an average rating of 3.6/10. The website's consensus reads: "An empty, relentlessly frantic thriller, The Runner's real time gimmick and flat-footed plotting generate more headaches than suspense." According to Metacritic, the film received "generally unfavorable" reviews based on a weighted average score of 28 out of 100 from 14 critic scores.

Former Rolling Stone film critic Peter Travers said of the film: "If someone asks you to watch The Runner with them, go with a two-word answer: hard pass". Robert Daniels of The New York Times called the film "unimaginative" and commented: "Gal Gadot limps ahead as a desperate single mother in a thin race-against-time thriller".

Jacob Oller, writing for The A.V. Club, described the film as "boneheaded" and "a perfect hate-watch" noting that Macdonald "slaps together some cheap, quick-cut montages gesturing at the modern surveillance state" but lacks the "feel for the pace or tension needed to keep the energy up in a film like this," and commenting that "The extended workout, either shot so far away that it looks like stock footage or so tight that it loses all sense of context, is never any more exciting than watching Gadot lope on a treadmill."

Dennis Harvey, in a similarly negative review for Variety, wrote that the film "lacks the strong suspense or novelty necessary to elevate an overfamiliar concept" and criticized the acting, saying "Nor is Gadot a performer inclined to lend much more than athleticism to a role that could use some warmth and idiosyncrasy to color its rather generic action-hero gist."

In a review for TheWrap, William Bibbiani wrote, "The Runner isn't much of a thriller. It isn't much of a movie. It would, however, be a hilarious episode of Taskmaster."

== See also ==
Run Lola Run, 1998 German film with similar premise.
