= André Moraes =

- Born: André Torres Moraes; 6 March 1977 (age 49); Brasília, DF, Brazil
- Genre: Soundtrack
- Occupations: Movie director, film composer, music producer
- Instruments: guitar, piano, keyboard, synthesizer,
- Years active: 1995–present
- Label: Music Brokers
- Website: www.andremoraes.se

André Moraes (born 6 March 1977 as André Torres Moraes) is a Brazilian Latin Grammy-nominated musician, film director, music producer and soundtrack composer. He has worked in the entertainment industry for two decades. He has been married to actress Ana Carolina Machado since 24 August 2010.

== Career ==
André began studying classical music and blues guitar at the age of 6 inspired by his father, Geraldo Moraes. He then studied film music under the tutelage of David Tygel and Gabriel Yared. While still a teen, he relocated to Rio de Janeiro and co-formed music group Infierno, which toured and released a full-length album.

In 1997, at age 20, he composed his first soundtrack score, for No Coração dos Deuse (In the Heart of the Gods), directed by his father, working alongside Faith No More member Mike Patton. To date, Andre has composed 45 film scores, eight short-film scores and music for four TV shows. Among his works, he has composed for Assalto ao Banco Central, Meu Tio Matou um Cara, O Coronel e o Lobisomem, Melhor Trilha Sonora, Viva Sapato! and Lisbela e o Prisioneiro.

In addition, André has served as producer for several albums, including Dante XXI by Sepultura, Guns N' Roses keyboardist Chris Pitman, and artists like Caetano Veloso, Gilberto Gil, Milton Nascimento, Igor Cavalera, Jair Rodrigues, Jorge Mautner, Mart'nália; and has also written for theater and television. He was then invited to act in Out of Tune by Walter Lima Júnior and The Man Who Challenged the Devil (for which he also composed the soundtrack).

As a director, André shoot, produced and written a lot of short-films and music videos, including "De Você" by Pitty (nominated for "Video of the Year" at the 2008 MTV Video Music Brazil awards,) and "We've Lost You" by Sepultura; released his own solo album, featuring Patton.

In 2004, he was a guitarist in the Brazilian biographical film Cazuza – O Tempo Não Pára.

His first feature-film is Payback (or Entrando Numa Roubada) in 2015, which he wrote, directed and composed the soundtrack. Percussionist Omar Hakim and bassist Lee Sklar perform in the film with André. André is also the founder and owner of Autorama Films.
