= The Critic (2023 film) =

2023 film by Anand Tucker

- Theatrical release poster
- Directed by: Anand Tucker
- Screenplay by: Patrick Marber
- Based on: Curtain Call by Anthony Quinn
- Produced by: Bill Kenwright; Jolyon Symonds; Anand Tucker
- Starring: Ian McKellen; Gemma Arterton; Mark Strong; Ben Barnes; Alfred Enoch; Romola Garai; Lesley Manville
- Cinematography: David Higgs
- Edited by: Beverley Mills
- Music by: Craig Armstrong
- Production companies: BKStudios; Fearless Minds; Seven Stories
- Distributed by: Lionsgate
- Release dates: 7 September 2023 (TIFF); 13 September 2024 (United Kingdom)
- Running time: 101 minutes
- Country: United Kingdom
- Language: English
- Box office: $2.7 million

The Critic is a 2023 British period thriller film directed by Anand Tucker and written by Patrick Marber, based on the 2015 novel Curtain Call by Anthony Quinn. The film stars Ian McKellen, Gemma Arterton, Mark Strong, Ben Barnes, Alfred Enoch, Romola Garai, and Lesley Manville.

The Critic premiered at the Toronto International Film Festival on 7 September 2023, and was released in the United Kingdom by Lionsgate on 13 September 2024.

== Plot ==
In 1934 London, Jimmy Erskine (Ian McKellen) is the theatre critic for The Daily Chronicle, a tabloid newspaper now owned and run by Viscount David Brooke (Mark Strong) after the death of his father. Erskine delights in writing vitriolic reviews of plays that he believes fall short of his high standards, despite requests from Brooke to tone it down.

After Erskine and his secretary and lover Tom Turner (Alfred Enoch) are arrested for homosexuality, Brooke dismisses him, along with other older employees. Erskine plots his revenge by persuading Nina Land (Gemma Arterton), a young actress, to enter a Faustian plot whereby she will seduce Brooke, who is already in love with her, in return for future glowing reviews. Erskine then blackmails Brooke into giving him his job back. When Brooke discovers that Land is also the lover of Stephen Wyley, his son-in-law (Ben Barnes), Brooke kills himself.

Driven by guilt for her part in this plot, a drunk Land visits Erskine, who, concerned that she will reveal the truth, drowns her in a bath. Erskine then persuades Turner to help dispose of the body, and when discovered, she is presumed to have committed suicide.

Finally, Turner visits The Chronicle's new owner, Brooke's daughter, and confesses. Erskine is arrested and jailed and Turner becomes The Chronicle's new theatre critic.

== Cast ==
- Ian McKellen as Jimmy Erskine
- Gemma Arterton as Nina Land
- Mark Strong as David Brooke
- Lesley Manville as Annabel Land
- Romola Garai as Cora Wyley
- Ben Barnes as Stephen Wyley
- Alfred Enoch as Tom Turner
- Nikesh Patel as Ferdy Harwood
- Jay Simpson as Slyfield
- Claire Skinner as Mary Brooke
- Rebecca Gethings as Joan Harris
- Ron Cook as Hugh Morris
- Beau Gadsdon as Freya Wyley

== Production ==
It was announced in November 2020 that Colin Firth, Gemma Arterton, Simon Russell Beale and Paapa Essiedu were set to star in the film, at the time titled Curtain Call like the source novel, with Anand Tucker directing and Patrick Marber writing the screenplay. By February 2021, filming was expected to begin later that year.

In June 2022, the film was retitled The Critic, with Firth, Beale and Essiedu no longer involved. Ian McKellen, Mark Strong, Lesley Manville, Romola Garai, Ben Barnes and Alfred Enoch were announced to be joining Arterton, and production began in London. In July 2024 it was announced that the film would be released in UK cinemas on 13 September 2024.

== Reception ==
On the review aggregator website Rotten Tomatoes, 51% of 94 critics' reviews are positive. The website's consensus reads: "Everyone's a critic, and Ian McKellen is better than most at playing one, but even his character would give this rote melodrama a so-so review." Metacritic, which uses a weighted average, assigned the film a score of 54 out of 100, based on 24 critics, indicating "mixed or average" reviews.

Benjamin Lee of The Guardian gave the film three out of five stars and wrote "a devious Ian McKellen anchors uneven thriller".
