= The Man Who Copied =

2003 film by Jorge Furtado

- Theatrical release poster
- Portuguese: O Homem que Copiava
- Directed by: Jorge Furtado
- Written by: Jorge Furtado
- Starring: Lázaro Ramos; Leandra Leal; Pedro Cardoso; Luana Piovani
- Cinematography: Alex Sernambi
- Edited by: Giba Assis Brasil
- Music by: Leo Henkin
- Production companies: Casa de Cinema de Porto Alegre; Globo Filmes
- Distributed by: Columbia TriStar Film Distributors International
- Release date: 13 June 2003 (Brazil)
- Running time: 123 minutes
- Country: Brazil
- Language: Portuguese
- Box office: R$4.7 million

The Man Who Copied (Portuguese: O Homem que Copiava; Portuguese pronunciation: [u ˈõmẽ ki koˈpjavɐ]) is a 2003 Brazilian crime comedy-drama film written and directed by Jorge Furtado, set in Porto Alegre, Rio Grande do Sul, Brazil.

The Man Who Copied takes the form of a "how-to" guide for social mobility. Despite the crime involved in the film, it still has the feel of a lighthearted romantic comedy (which is a relatively new genre in Brazilian film and television, introduced in the 1990s by the American and British film and television industries).

The film won eleven awards, including Best Picture from the São Paulo Association of Art Critics Award in 2004. The 2003 release date helped the film gain momentum, as from the 1990s to the early 2000s, Brazilian films began getting more competitive in both the national and international markets (especially with the release of City of God).

== Plot ==
Nineteen-year-old André Maciel (Lázaro Ramos) works as a photocopy machine operator in a convenience store in Porto Alegre. Disillusioned with his life and obsessed with material wealth, he dreams of being an illustrator, but his comics, though well drawn, are rejected by publishers. After André returns home from work, he spends time in his room drawing or spying with binoculars on Sílvia (Leandra Leal), a neighbor who lives in an apartment across the street with her father Antunes.

Following Silvia to work one morning, André finds that she works at a lingerie store, coincidentally called ‘Sílvia’s.” Once he follows Sílvia inside the store, he realizes he needs an excuse to be in there, and tells Sílvia that he is looking for a birthday gift for his mother. Sílvia suggests that he buy a robe that costs R$38. However, André cannot afford this, and he promises Sílvia that he will return and buy it later.

One evening, he visits a club with Marinês (Luana Piovani), an attractive co-worker, who introduces him to a friend of hers Cardoso, (Pedro Cardoso), who works in antiques. André is initially impressed by the well dressed Cardoso, whom he assumes is well off. Later, when they are alone, Cardoso hits on Marinês and she refuses him, all but admitting that she is a gold digger and having suspected earlier that Cardoso is poor from his resoled shoes, and that she dislikes Cardoso's smoking.

Leaving the club, Andre boards a bus and sees Silvia, wanting to make small talk, he promises to buy the robe at the next opportunity.

Still believing that Cardoso is rich, André visits him at his place of work and finds that he sells junk for a living. Over coffee, André realizes that Cardoso also has no money and in a later scene, that Cardoso is as obsessed with material wealth as him, believing it to be necessary to woo Marinês.

By chance, André's boss leaves him with a R$50 bill in order to run some errands. Giving in to temptation, André photocopies the note bank notes at his job. To dispose of the note, André begins gambling in the lottery. One of André's counterfeit notes is accidentally used by Cardoso to buy them drinks and André reveals his counterfeiting to Cardoso. On their lottery runs, André plays the sequence of numbers ‘1 2 3 4 5 6', earning him the mockery of Cardoso, who believes that that combination will never come out.

A relationship blossoms between André and Sílvia, and eventually, André proposes marriage. Sílvia says yes, however, André tells her that they cannot get married right away; André feels he needs more money to provide for Sílvia – more money than he can get from counterfeiting.

André hatches a plan to pull a bank heist with Cardoso and purchases a gun (using more counterfeit money) from Feitosa, a drug dealing acquaintance of his. The heist is successful, however, André was unmasked and had to shoot Antunes, a passerby, to make his getaway.

André and Cardoso are both relieved to find that the police sketch of the bank robber looks nothing like him. That joy is compounded when the pair find out André won the lottery. However, André is worried about being recognized should his lottery win be published in the news in light of the bank robbery. The pair rope in Marinês to help them claim the winnings.

Flush with cash, André, Cardoso and Marinês go on a shopping spree. Cardoso and Marinês check into a luxurious hotel, where they have sex. André asks Silvia to leave with him, but she believes that Antunes would not allow it. André agrees to meet Antunes.

Meeting at a restaurant, and while the other party is not present, André learns that Silvia hates Antunes, who she believes isn't her real father, Antunes reveals to André that while he recognizes him, he will not turn André in nor does he want any of the heist money, but half of the lottery money.

Leaving the restaurant, André is accosted by Feitosa, who had been arrested earlier when he tried to spend some of the counterfeit money given to him by André but managed to get released quickly due to having underworld connections. Feitosa had figured out that André is the bank robber, having been questioned about the gun that he sold André, and demands the heist money. André agrees to pass the money to Feitosa the following day.

That night, Silvia confronts André, having learnt about his part in the bank heist from Antunes. André initially proposes to pay off Antunes with the heist money, but Silvia proposes to kill him instead.

The next day, André double crosses Feitosa and leads him into a trap, killing him. Later, André, Cardoso, Marinês and Silvia set a trap for Antunes. Initially, the plan goes awry, but they succeed in killing him and framing him for the bank heist.

The film ends with the four friends at the Christ the Redeemer statue in Rio de Janeiro, where Sílvia meets the man she believes is her father, Paulo (Paulo José), while also subsequently revealing that she had orchestrated some of her initial coincidental meetings with André.

== Cast ==
- Lázaro Ramos as André
- Leandra Leal as Silvia
- Pedro Cardoso as Cardoso
- Luana Piovani as Marinês
- Paulo José as Paulo
- Júlio Andrade as Feitosa
- Carlos Cunha as Antunes

== Themes ==
Social Mobility/Wealth: The Man Who Copied deals the hierarchy in Brazilian society based on material wealth and what it takes to move up. André's voice over throughout the film turns The Man Who Copied into an ironic manual for social mobility, but it also is a classic Furtado stylistic move used to create intimacy with the characters. Hearing André's story through the voice over helps the audience sympathize with him despite the numerous crimes he and his friends commit. Mainly, his compares the different levels of freedom possible by the money and the alienation and lack of choice provocated by the lack of this. The voice over helps the audience understand the factors that drive André to commit crimes in order to achieve wealth and climb the social hierarchy, because his voice overs reveal that he has good, non-greedy intentions.

Luck: Furtado illuminates that the characters in The Man Who Copied (who are all lower-middle class Brazilians working mundane jobs) have as much depth as the audience of this film (presumably middle to upper-middle class audiences). Furtado displays that wealth of any kind is most often due to luck (whether it be the family one was born into or a lottery prize) through many of the events impacting André. The first display of luck for André is the R$50 note his boss gives him, followed by the coincidence of the note being given to him the same day as his shop gets a color printer, his winning the lottery, and the fact that Sílvia was also pursuing him secretly as he pursued her. With this, Furtado makes to social commentary that our spot in the social hierarchy is based on luck.

== See also ==
- Currency (film), an Indian Malayalam film loosely based on The Man Who Copied
