= St Pancras Way =

Street in the London Borough of Camden, England, UK

Coordinates: 51.54004°N 0.13564°W

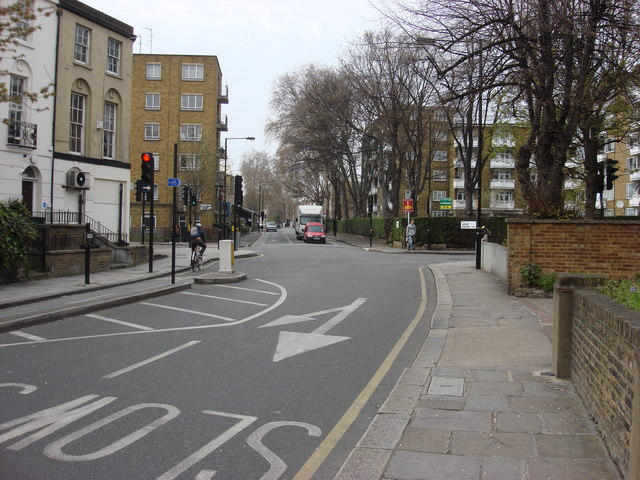
St Pancras Way in 2008

St Pancras Way is a road in Camden Town, London.

It was formerly a toll road named Kings Road, and was the location of the St Pancras Workhouse, which is now the site of St Pancras Hospital. It was renamed to St Pancras Way in 1937.

At one point, part of the River Fleet followed the route of St Pancras Way.

The Constitution pub is situated at the crossing point of St Pancras Way with Regent's Canal.

== See also ==
- Agar Town
