= Alfred Enoch =

English actor (born 1988)

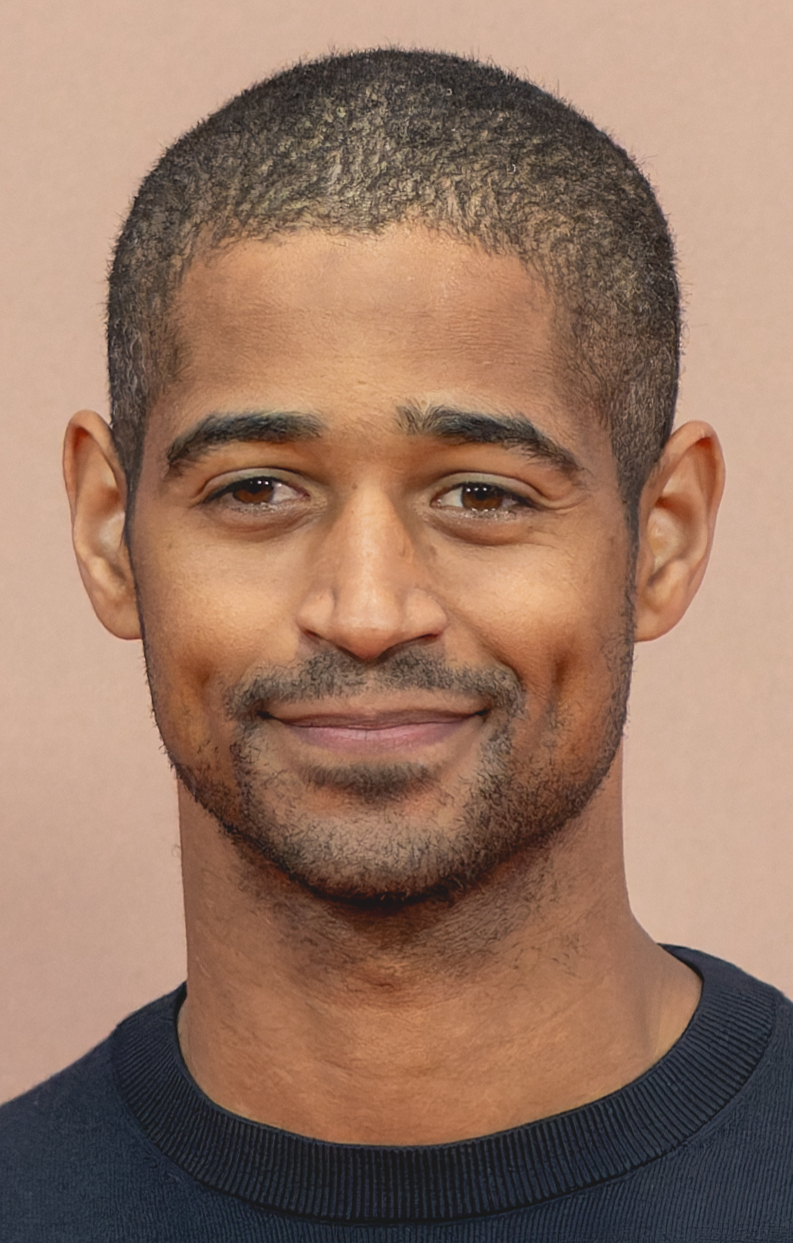
- Enoch in 2024
- Born: Alfred Lewis Enoch; 2 December 1988 (age 37); London, England
- Citizenship: United Kingdom; Brazil
- Education: The Queen's College, Oxford (BA)
- Occupation: Actor
- Years active: 2001–present
- Known for: Dean Thomas in Harry Potter; Wes Gibbins in How to Get Away with Murder
- Father: William Russell

Alfred Lewis Enoch (born 2 December 1988) is an English actor, best known for playing Dean Thomas in the fantasy film series Harry Potter and Wes Gibbins in the legal thriller television series How to Get Away with Murder.

== Early life and education ==
Enoch was born on 2 December 1988 in the Westminster district of London, to actor William Russell and his second wife, Etheline, a Barbadian Brazilian doctor. He has three half-siblings from his father's previous marriage, and holds dual British and Brazilian citizenship. He lived with his parents in southern France when he was two or three. He was educated at Westminster School, a historic public school in Westminster, London.

Enoch is a fluent speaker of English, speaks a bit of French, Portuguese, and Spanish, and graduated from the Queen's College, Oxford with a Bachelor of Arts in Modern Languages.

== Career ==
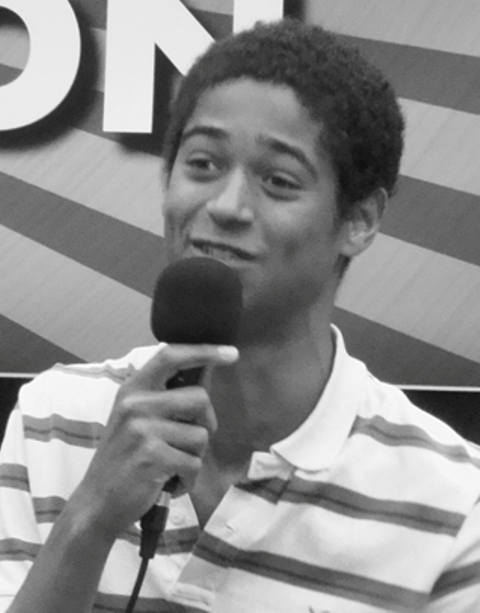
Enoch at the 2011 London Film and Comic Con

In 2001, Enoch made his acting debut as Dean Thomas in Harry Potter and the Philosopher's Stone. At first, Enoch was reluctant to audition, as he was unable to think of very many black Harry Potter characters. He did, however, and he played the character throughout the entire franchise. He also voiced the character in several of the Harry Potter video games.

After the Harry Potter films, Enoch appeared in a number of plays throughout London including Coriolanus, Timon of Athens, Antigone, and Happy New. He made a guest appearance as Stephen Bainbridge, the Bloody Guardsman, in the Sherlock episode, "The Sign of Three". In 2014, Enoch began starring as Wes Gibbins in the ABC legal thriller series How to Get Away with Murder, produced by Shonda Rhimes.

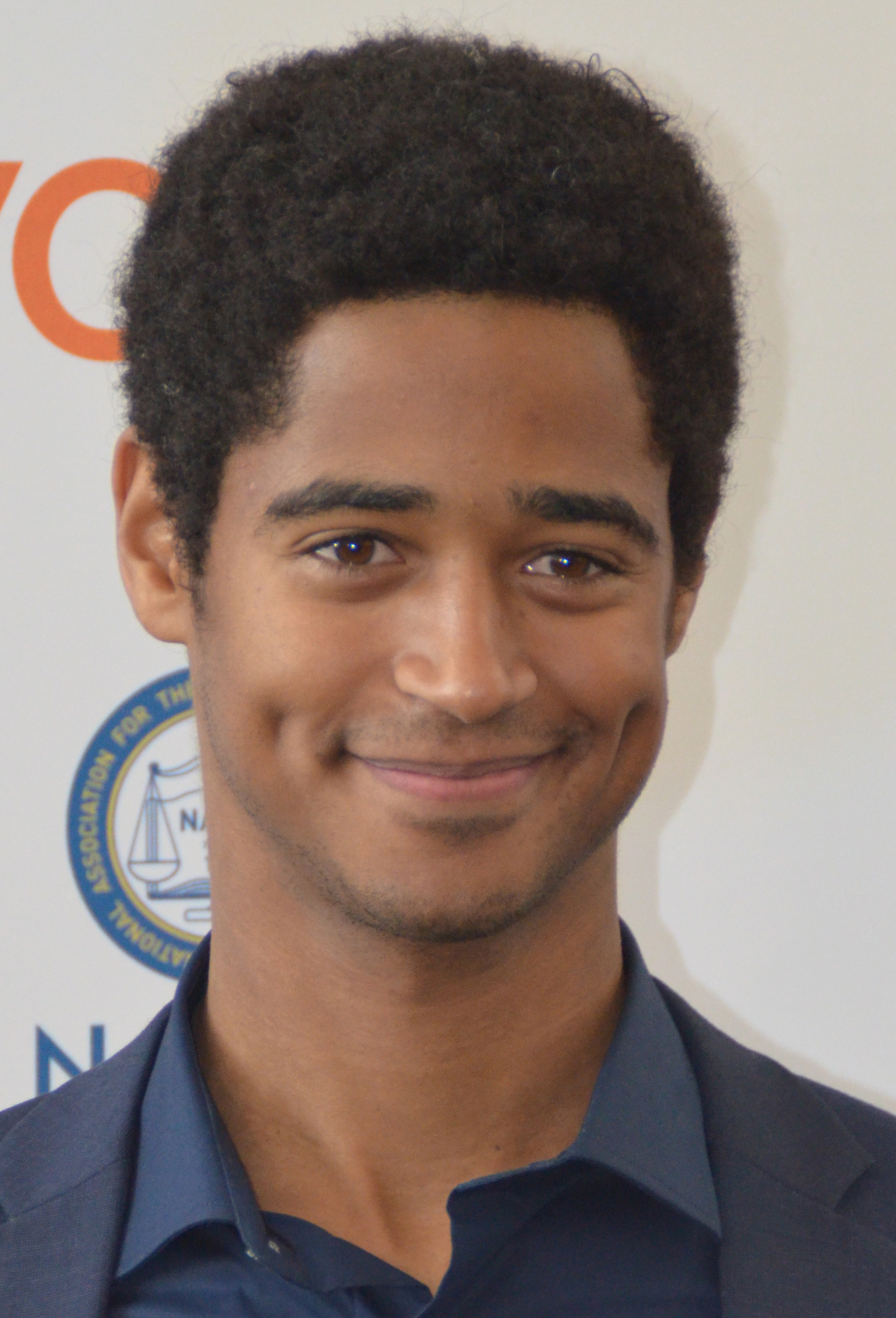
Enoch at the 46th NAACP Image Awards in 2015

In 2016, Enoch played Edgar/Poor Tom in the well-received Talawa Theatre Company and Manchester Royal Exchange co-production of King Lear, for which he garnered much praise for his characterisation and the physicality he brought to the roles.

Enoch returned to the West End in the 2018 revival of Red at Wyndham's Theatre, starring alongside Alfred Molina. That same year, he played Aeneas, in the BBC ONE & Netflix TV miniseries Troy: Fall of a City. The following year, Enoch took the leading role 'Jamie McCain' in BBC drama Trust Me, series 2.

In 2020, Enoch returned for two episodes of How to Get Away with Murder's sixth season but in the separate role of the adult version of Christopher Castillo, Wes' son. That same year, he played Antônio in Executive Order and Ryan in Tigers.

In 2021, he played Romeo in a production of Romeo and Juliet at the Globe Theatre in London, Raych Seldon in Apple TV+ science fiction series Foundation, and Harry Wotton in a 2021 adaptation of The Picture of Dorian Gray.

Enoch returned to the special featuring Harry Potter 20th Anniversary: Return to Hogwarts in 2022. He played the Dramaturg in Shades of Blue at Sadler's Wells in May of that same year. Enoch also played Adam in This is Christmas.

In 2023, Enoch played Pete in the TV series The Couple Next Door and Tom in The Critic. He played Gabe on the BBC audio drama People Who Knew Me that same year.

In 2025, Enoch portrayed Mr (Doctor) Lidderdale in the four-part BBC historical television series Miss Austen.

In 2026, Enoch played Ted in The Runner, a London-set psychological thriller directed by Kevin Macdonald and starring Gal Gadot, Damian Lewis and Rory Wilmot. Enoch was part of the cast during filming throughout 2025, when the production received notable media attention, particularly from the BBC and the Standard, after filming in London was disrupted by Palestine activists, resulting in police intervention and the arrest of several demonstrators. The film was eventually released on Prime Video in September 2026, the same year Enoch returned to the Royal Shakespeare Company to play the title role in Henry V.

== Personal life ==
As of 2021, Enoch lives in London with his girlfriend.

== Theatre ==
| Year | Title | Role | Notes |
|---|---|---|---|
| 1999 | The Ballad of Salomon Pavey | Kit Webster | National Youth Music Theatre at Shakespeare's Globe & Tour |
| 2008 | The Tempest | Ferdinand | Tomahawk Theatre |
| 2011 | The Seagull | Trigorin | Oxford Playhouse |
| 2011 | Dinner | Mike | Edinburgh Fringe Festival |
| 2012 | Happy New | Danny | Made professional London stage debut at the Old Red Lion. |
| 2012 | Timon of Athens | Philotus | National Theatre |
| 2012 | Antigone | Chorus | National Theatre |
| 2014 | Coriolanus | Titus Lartius | Donmar Warehouse |
| 2016 | King Lear | Edgar/Poor Tom | Royal Exchange |
| 2018 | Red | Ken | Wyndham's Theatre/MGC |
| 2019 | Tree | Kaleo | Young Vic theatre |
| 2020 | CRAVE | B | Chichester Festival Theatre |
| 2020 | What A Carve Up! | Raymond Owen | The Barn Theatre, Lawrence Batley Theatre and New Wolsey Theatre (Online) |
| 2021 | The Picture of Dorian Gray | Lord Henry Wotton | Theatr Clwyd, Barn Theatre, Oxford Playhouse, the New Wolsey Theatre, Lawrence Batley Theatre (Online) |
| 2021 | Watch on the Rhine | David | Broadway's Best Shows (U.S) (Online) |
| 2021 | Romeo and Juliet | Romeo | Shakespeare's Globe |
| 2022 | Shades of Blue | —N/a | Dramaturg only. Sadler's Wells Theatre |
| 2022 | As You Like It | Orlando | Soho Place |
| 2024 | Pericles | Pericles | Swan Theatre, Stratford-Upon-Avon, Royal Shakespeare Company |
| 2026 | Henry V | Henry V | Royal Shakespeare Theatre, Stratford-Upon-Avon, Royal Shakespeare Company |
| 2026 | The Cherry Orchard | Trofimov | Swan Theatre, Stratford-Upon-Avon, Royal Shakespeare Company |

== Filmography ==
=== Film ===
| Year | Title | Role | Notes |
|---|---|---|---|
| 2001 | Harry Potter and the Philosopher's Stone | Dean Thomas | |
| 2002 | Harry Potter and the Chamber of Secrets | Dean Thomas | |
| 2004 | Harry Potter and the Prisoner of Azkaban | Dean Thomas | |
| 2005 | Harry Potter and the Goblet of Fire | Dean Thomas | Credited as Alfie Enoch |
| 2007 | Harry Potter and the Order of the Phoenix | Dean Thomas | |
| 2009 | Harry Potter and the Half-Blood Prince | Dean Thomas | |
| 2011 | Harry Potter and the Deathly Hallows – Part 2 | Dean Thomas | Credited as Alfie Enoch |
| 2020 | Executive Order | Antônio Rodrigues | |
| 2020 | Tigers | Ryan | |
| 2022 | This Is Christmas | Adam | |
| 2023 | The Critic | Tom Turner | |
| 2026 | The Runner | Ted | |

=== Television ===
| Year | Title | Role | Notes |
|---|---|---|---|
| 2013 | Broadchurch | Sam Taylor | 1 episode |
| 2013 | Mount Pleasant | Alex | 1 episode |
| 2014 | Sherlock | Stephen Bainbridge | Episode: "The Sign of Three" |
| 2014–2017, 2019–2020 | How to Get Away with Murder | Wesley "Wes" Gibbins / Christopher Castillo | Main role (season 1–3); guest role (season 4, 6) |
| 2018 | Troy: Fall of a City | Aeneas | Main role |
| 2019 | Trust Me | Jamie McCain | Main role (season 2) |
| 2021–2023 | Foundation | Raych Foss | Recurring role (season 1); guest role (season 2) |
| 2022 | Harry Potter 20th Anniversary: Return to Hogwarts | Himself | Television special |
| 2023 | The Couple Next Door | Pete Thomas | Main role (season 1) |
| 2025 | Miss Austen | Mr. Lidderdale | Main role |
| 2025 | The Proud Family: Louder and Prouder | Griffin (voice) | Episode: "Wiz Kid" |
| 2026 | Run Away | DS Isaac Fagbenle | Netflix series |

== Audio ==
=== Video games ===
| Year | Title | Role | Notes |
|---|---|---|---|
| 2007 | Harry Potter and the Order of the Phoenix | Dean Thomas | Credited as Alfie Enoch |
| 2009 | Harry Potter and the Half-Blood Prince | Dean Thomas | Credited as Alfie Enoch |
| 2010 | Harry Potter and the Deathly Hallows: Part I | Dean Thomas | Credited as Alfie Enoch |
| 2011 | Harry Potter and the Deathly Hallows: Part II | Dean Thomas | Credited as Alfie Enoch |

=== Audiobooks ===
| Year | Title | Author | Notes |
|---|---|---|---|
| 2020 | The Secret Explorers Series | SJ King | DK Audio |
| 2020 | How the Beetle Got Its Colours | Brazilian folktale | Wonderful Beast: Lockdown Tales |
| 2021 | Car Crash | Eddie Robson | Bafflegab Productions |
| 2022 | 120th anniversary of The Tale of Peter Rabbit | Beatrix Potter | Yoto & Penguin Audio |
| 2022 | My Sweet Orange Tree | José Mauro de Vasconcelos | Audible Studios |
| 2022 | Madly, Deeply: The Diaries of Alan Rickman | Alan Rickman | Henry Holt and Co. |
| 2023 | Pyramids：(Discworld Novel 7) | Terry Pratchett | Penguin Audio |
| 2024 | Danny the Champion of the World | Roald Dahl | Puffin |

=== Audio dramas ===
| Year | Title | Role | Notes |
|---|---|---|---|
| 2020 | Electric Decade: Cane | | BBC Radio 4 |
| 2021 | The Hand of Ethelberta | Christopher Julian | BBC Radio 4 |
| 2021 | Lights Up: Dedication | William Shakespeare (Main) | BBC Radio 4 |
| 2021 | Running With Lions | Joshua | BBC Radio 4 & Talawa |
| 2022 | Darkness | Lord Byron (Main) | BBC Radio 4 |
| 2022 | Strings | Rez | BBC Radio 3 |
| 2023 | People Who Knew Me | Gabe | BBC Radio 5 |
| 2024 | The Seneschal: A Rebel Moon Story | Adwin | Netflix |

== Awards and nominations ==
| Year | Award | Category | Nominated work | Result |
|---|---|---|---|---|
| 2015 | NAACP Image Award | Outstanding Supporting Actor in a Drama Series | How to Get Away with Murder | Nominated |
| 2016 | NAACP Image Award | Outstanding Supporting Actor in a Drama Series | How to Get Away with Murder | Nominated |
| 2017 | NAACP Image Award | Outstanding Supporting Actor in a Drama Series | How to Get Away with Murder | Nominated |
| 2018 | IARA AWARDS | Best Young Actor | How to Get Away with Murder | Nominated |
| 2021 | Pan African Film Festival | Canada Lee Award | Executive Order（Medida Provisória） | Won |
| 2021 | FESTin | Best Actor Award | Executive Order（Medida Provisória） | Won |
| 2023 | BBC Audio Drama Awards | Best Actor | Darkness | Nominated |
