= Currency (film) =

- Directed by: Swathi Bhaskar
- Written by: Swathi Bhaskar
- Produced by: Monica Gill
- Starring: Jayasurya; Mukesh; Meera Nandan; Kalabhavan Mani
- Cinematography: Viswamangal Kitsu
- Edited by: Manoj
- Music by: Siddharth Vipin
- Release date: 30 April 2009
- Country: India
- Language: Malayalam

Currency is a 2009 Malayalam crime film by directed by Swathi Bhaskar starring Jayasurya, Mukesh, Kalabhavan Mani and Meera Nandan.

The film is inspired from the 2003 Brazilian crime comedy The Man Who Copied.

== Plot ==
Keshu is a 12th-failed man who is working in a photocopy store, owned by Indrabalan. As an introvert, he is love with Rose, a sales girl in the nearby boutique. Keshu often takes photocopies of currency notes which look real, but he fears spending them. One day, he meets Danny D'Souza, an Anglo Indian man who works in an antique shop, who realizes the competence of Keshu in creating fake currencies. Danny forces him to continue with his act. Danny gets the information that a popular party in Kerala is bringing 10 crores of rupees to Kerala from Bangalore by road. He creates a scene with the help of some rowdies and cleverly replaces the 10 crore real notes with fake ones. They hide the real notes in a slum under the supervision of Iruttu.

When the political party starts spending the money, the police get the information, and Paneer Raghavan, an Intelligence Bureau officer, starts investigating. In the meantime, Keshu's mom gets admitted to the hospital, and Keshu immediately wants 25,000 to pay for the hospital. They go to Iruttu to take the money. A fight erupts between Danny and Keshu. Iruttu, taking advantage of the situation, becomes greedy and tries to take all the money by killing them. But Keshu hits Iruttu in the head and they escape with the money. Iruttu takes Rose as hostage and asks Keshu to return the money. He pays the money and Iruttu escapes with it. But he is soon captured by the police and thus, Danny and Keshu escape the charges. They also get to know that they won the first prize in a lottery and don't have to do any fraud activities to live from now on.

== Cast ==
- Jayasurya as Keshava Menon (Keshu)
- Mukesh as Danny D'Souza (Sayippu)
- Kalabhavan Mani as Iruttu
- Anoop Menon as Paneer Raghavan, Intelligence Bureau Officer
- Meera Nandan as Rose
- Seetha as Subhadra, Keshu's mother
- K. G. George as Prof. Arunachalam
- Mamukoya as Koyakka
- Kalabhavan Haneef as a Konkani man in the street
- Suraj Venjaramood as Indrabalan
- Anoop Chandran as Danny D'Souza's helper
- Majeed as doctor

== Reception ==
Paresh C. Palicha of Rediff gave the film a rating of two out of five stars and wrote that "Though this is Swathi Bhaskar's first feature film, he shows flair and competence. But for some unrealistic blemishes in the second half, he makes his Currency work". Sify wrote that "You've to admit this, director Swathi Bhaskar's Currency has a nice concept and has a fresh storyline as well. But for the viewer, what matters is the transformation of that idea on to the screen. That is exactly where the film loses its grip".

== Controversy ==
In 2022, the film gained notoriety in Brazil after Jorge Furtado, director of The Man Who Copied, found out about it through an IMDb entry for the Indian movie, Furtado alleged that Swathi Bhaskar copied the entire plot without asking for permission, but decided not to sue Bhaskar mentioning he found too hard to prosecute him on the Indian legal system.
