= Darlan Cunha =

Brazilian actor

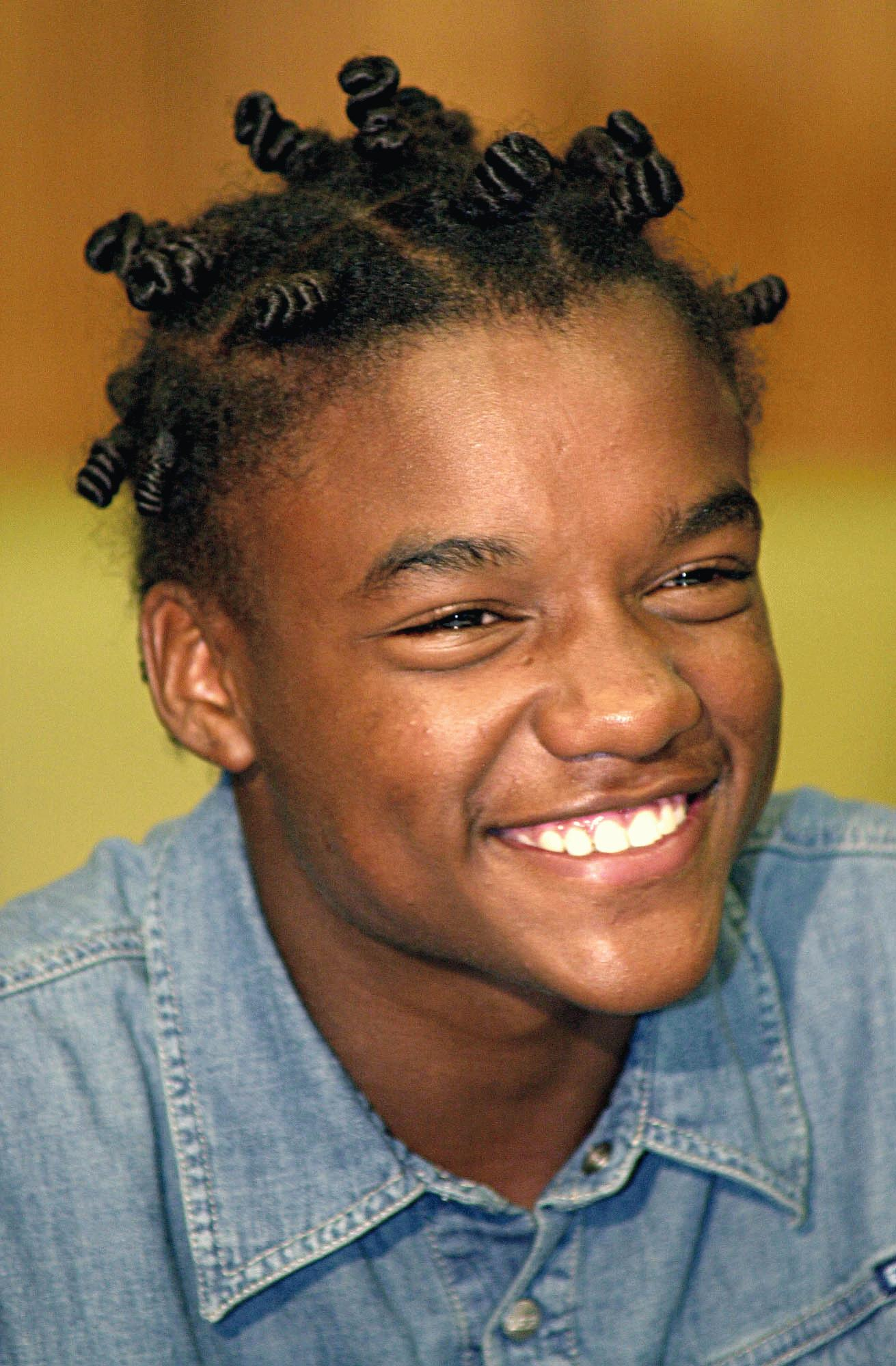
- Darlan Cunha
- Occupation: Actor
- Known for: Acting

Darlan Cunha is a Brazilian actor. Better known as Laranjinha from his breakthrough role in Cidade dos Homens and from his part in the film Cidade de Deus. He began his career when he was selected for the short film Palace II, along with Douglas Silva.

== Filmography ==
- Palace II
- Cidade de Deus (2002)
- Sítio do Picapau Amarelo (2002)
- Cidade dos Homens (2003)
- Meu Tio Matou Um Cara (2004)
- Cidade dos Homens – The Movie (2007)
- Sete Pecados (2007)
- Caminho das Índias (2009)
- City of God - 10 Years Later (2012)
