= Meu Tio Matou um Cara =

2004 film by Jorge Furtado

- Theatrical release poster
- Directed by: Jorge Furtado
- Written by: Guel Arraes; Jorge Furtado
- Produced by: Paula Lavigne; Guel Arraes; Luciana Tomasi; Nora Goulart
- Starring: Lázaro Ramos; Darlan Cunha; Deborah Secco; Dira Paes; Aílton Graça; Sophia Reis; Renan Gioelli
- Cinematography: Alex Sernambi
- Edited by: Giba Assis Brasil
- Music by: Caetano Veloso; André Moraes
- Production companies: Casa de Cinema de Porto Alegre; Globo Filmes; Natasha Filmes
- Distributed by: Elo Audiovisual; 20th Century Fox
- Release date: 31 December 2004
- Running time: 87 minutes
- Country: Brazil
- Language: Portuguese

Meu Tio Matou um Cara (lit. 'My Uncle Killed a Guy') is a 2004 Brazilian crime comedy film co-written and directed by Jorge Furtado. It follows the adventures of 15-year-old Duca (Darlan Cunha) and his two friends after his uncle, Eder (Lázaro Ramos), confesses to his family of having shot a man. However, Duca suspects that his uncle's story about killing his lover's ex-husband in self-defense is not entirely truthful and so sets out to solve the mystery.

== Plot ==
After Eder shows up and confesses to what he has done, Duca's father, Laerte, calls his lawyer-friend to help Eder prepare his defense. Duca then goes to his long-time friend Isa's house, for whom he secretly has feelings, to tell her about the excitement. Soon afterwards, his other friend Kid arrives as well, and they explain the story to him too. Duca sees Kid touch Isa's shoulder, though, and becomes jealous so he decides to return home.

The following day, Duca talks with Isa again, and his skill for detective work by spotting flaws in her story that she did not spend much time with Kid after Duca left; he does not mention this to her, though, and finds out the truth from Kid later while they are shopping for CDs.

As the story develops, Duca continues to try to subtly keep Isa and Kid from getting together due to Isa's obvious attraction to Kid, while simultaneously looking into the murder. To this end, Duca asks permission to visit Eder in jail.

Isa eagerly volunteers to go along on the adventure, and they set out the following day. When they meet Eder, he asks Duca to give a message to his lover. Eder asks Duca to tell her not to visit him while he is in jail, and to tell her that he is fine. On the way back, Isa remembers the Pokémon pen that was confiscated from her and they return to the jail to retrieve it. Since they took the bus through a dangerous part of town, they are forced to walk the distance. The two encounter a group of men who aggressively hit on Isa, causing her to run away.

The next day at school, she brags about her adventure, embellishing the details greatly to her friends. Duca remains silent, but when pressed for details himself, he disagrees with Isa, and she storms away angrily. Attempting to get past the incident, he pretends it never happened, to the annoyance of Isa. Kid, however, is eager to have an adventure of his own and so agrees to travel to Eder's girlfriend's condo and relay the message.

After locating Eder's Lover, Soraya, they are allowed up by the doorman. She answers her door scantily clad, and invites the boys in. They relay the message, to her general disinterest, and she requests that Duca repair her automatic pool cleaning device—a product of Eder's that failed to sell well. Out by her pool, Duca notices several items which lead him to believe another man is living with Soraya. Moving inside, his suspicions are confirmed when he sees a tattooed male arm answering a phone downstairs. While leaving, they accidentally track soil from a broken vase over the carpet downstairs to the fury of the doorman. They flee, giving Kid something to brag about at school the next day as well.

Duca again visits his uncle, and this time asks him more questions. He decides that Eder is lying about his involvement and is covering for Soraya, who Duca believes is the true killer. Duca believes that his uncle is taking the fall for a woman who is being unfaithful to Eder and may be simply using Eder. He believes that Eder would never take Duca's word for it about the man living with Soraya, and so he goes about hiring a private investigator to obtain photographic evidence.

Meanwhile, during the investigation, Duca is worried that an upcoming party will lead to Isa and Kid getting together at last, so he craftily plays matchmaker with Kid and another classmate. However, upon seeing how unhappy Isa becomes after watching the two dance, Duca helps to repair the situation and leaves the party with his two friends dancing closely together.

When the investigator shows the photographs, Duca is surprised to find it showing Kid back at Soraya's condo. The series of pictures seems to suggest that the two had sex, and when Isa asks to see the photographs, Duca refuses to show them, causing yet another fight between the two friends.

Duca mails the photographs to Eder, hoping it will convince him to tell the truth to the police, and he remains not on speaking terms with his two friends for nearly a week. Isa, hoping to make up, comes to his house and has lunch with Duca and his family. Eder shows up, having obtained Habeas corpus pending his trial. He has not yet opened the package containing the photographs Duca sent him, and becomes furious upon seeing them. He rushes from the house intent on killing both his girlfriend and her new lover. Isa also sees the pictures as well and is also crushed.

Duca convinces her that they must go to Soraya's condo, though, to try to stop Eder from doing something foolish. Eder, meanwhile, attacks the man living with his girlfriend and discovers that it is Fabio, Soraya's brother. The man in the pictures, however, is Kid (although the two do resemble each other). Soraya explains the series of photographs with an innocent story; but Duca can see that she is lying. As usual, though, he does not mention it to anyone. Eder and his girlfriend make up, and Duca decides to keep Soraya's secret seeing Eder so happy. Isa and Kid also break up, though Kid tells Duca privately that he had misread the situation and never had sex with Soraya. Isa informs Duca that she and Kid broke up, to which Duca offers condolences. Isa asks him if that is really how he feels and Duca admits that he is happy they are no longer together. The film ends with the two friends kissing and Eder's fate still unknown.

== Cast ==
- Lázaro Ramos as Éder Fragoso
- Darlan Cunha as Luiz Eduardo "Duca" Fragoso
- Deborah Secco as Soraya Wolker
- Sophia Reis as Isa
- Renan Gioelli as Leonardo "Kid"
- Dira Paes as Cléia Fragoso
- Aílton Graça as Laerte Fragoso
- Júlio Andrade as Detective Cícero
- Sergio Lulkin as Dr. Rogério
- Suelen de Sá as Ana Paula

== Music ==
- "Soraya Queimada" – Zéu Britto
- "Pra te lembrar" – Caetano Veloso
- "É tudo no meu nome" – Rappin' Hood
- "Barato total" – Gal Costa e Nação Zumbi
- "(Nothing But) Flowers" – Caetano Veloso
- "Meu Tio Matou um Cara" – Sangue Moloko
- "Se essa rua" – Rappin' Hood and Luciana Mello
- "Suas armas" – Pitty
- "Por onde andei" – Nando Reis
- "Habla de mí" – Orquestra Imperial
- "A cidade (Se essa rua)" – Instrumental
