= Namibia, no! =

Namibia, no! (Portuguese: Namíbia, não!) is a Brazilian theatrical play written by Aldri Anunciação between 2009 and 2011.

In 2019, a cinematographic version of the work with the title Executive Order (Portuguese: Medida Provisória, or Provisional Measure) was produced, with production and co-production by Lereby Productions, Lata Films, Melanina Acentuada Produções and Globo Filmes, directed by Lázaro Ramos and starring Alfred Enoch, Taís Araújo, Seu Jorge and Renata Sorrah. The film was set to premiere at the South by Southwest 2020 festival, but after the festival was cancelled due to the COVID-19 pandemic, it was delayed to the 2021 SXSW festival, and was exhibited at the 2020 Moscow International Film Festival and 2020 Indie Memphis. The film's creators have delayed the Brazilian release to after the mass vaccination of the population.

== Synopsis ==
In 2016, the Brazilian government issues a decree that, in reparation for slavery, all Brazilians of noticeable or detectable African descent shall be deported to Africa. But, in order not to incur the crime of “home invasion”, they can only be captured on the street, resulting in humiliating tests and violent arrests of countless Brazilians. Thus, André and Antônio spend the day locked in the apartment, debating the social and economic issues of current life, their personal desires and the consequences of an imminent return to mother Africa.

== See also ==
- Blanqueamiento
- Back to Africa
- Racial democracy
- Paper bag test
- Population transfer
