= Lázaro Ramos =

Brazilian actor, television presenter, director, writer, and voice actor

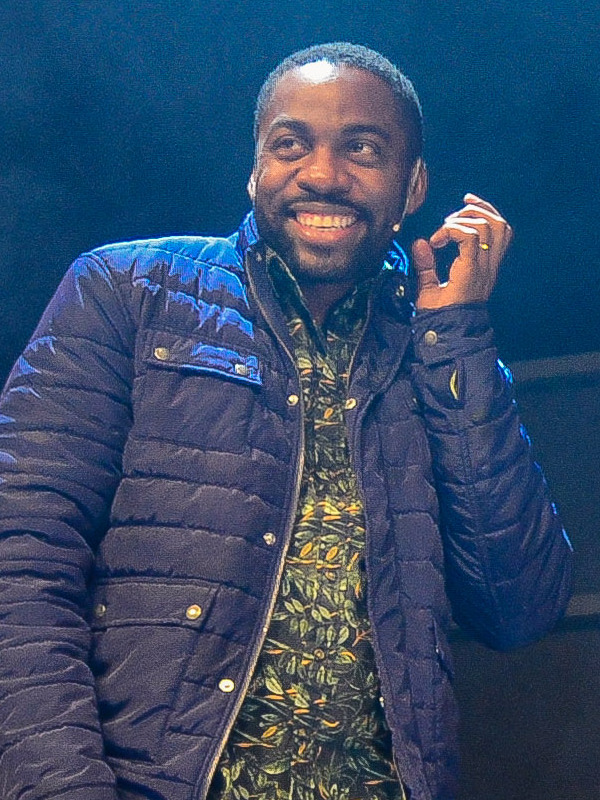
- Ramos in 2018
- Born: Luís Lázaro Sacramento Ramos; 1 November 1978 (age 47); Salvador, Bahia, Brazil
- Occupations: Actor; presenter; director; writer; voice actor
- Years active: 1993–present
- Spouse: Taís Araújo (m. 2007)
- Children: 2

Luís Lázaro Sacramento de Araújo Ramos (born 1 November 1978), professionally known as Lázaro Ramos, is a Brazilian actor, television presenter, activist, writer, and director. He has earned prizes such as Prêmios Arte Qualidade Brasil, two Prêmios APCA, as well as a Kikito and a Troféu Oscarito from the Festival de Gramado.

Considered one of the foremost actors of his generation, Lázaro Ramos began his acting career with the Flock of Olodum Theater group in Salvador in 1983. In 2002, he portrayed João Francisco dos Santos in the film Madame Satã, which received praise from critics, and kicked off his career, instantly making him one of the most recognizable actors in Brazilian cinema. He continued to act in other successful productions such as O Homem que Copiava (2003), Meu Tio Matou um Cara (2004), Cidade Baixa (2005), Ó Pai, Ó (2007), O Vendedor de Passados (2015), Tudo Que Aprendemos Juntos (2015), Mundo Cão (2016), O Beijo no Asfalto (2018), e O Silêncio da Chuva (2021).

In television, Lázaro Ramos is most well-known for his portrayal of Foguinho, a mischievous boy in the series Cobras & Lagartos, for which he was nominated for the 35th International Emmy Awards' Best Actor award in 2007. He has also acted in several other series, such as Duas Caras (2007), Lado a Lado (2012), Geração Brasil (2014), Mister Brau (2015-2018) and in the television programs Espelho (2006-2021) through Canal Brasil, and Lazinho com Você (2017) and Os Melhores Anos das Nossas Vidas (2018) through TV Globo.

Lázaro Ramos has also directed several episodes of Espelho and documentaries such as Zózimo Bulbul (2006) and Bando, um Filme De (2018), as well as the feature film Executive Order (2022), which he also wrote, and for which he received the award of best director in the Festival de Cinema Itinerante da Língua Portuguesa. He has written more than five children's books (examples include A Velha Sentada (2010), Caderno de rimas do João (2015), Descobrindo a minha história (2025), and Sinto o que sinto (2025)) and two memoirs, Na Minha Pele (2017) and Na Nossa Pele (2025). He is an activist for human rights and increased awareness of racism. He has been an ambassador of UNICEF for Brazil since July of 2009.

== Host on Canal Brasil ==
In 2006, Ramos' weekly television program, "Espelho" debuted on Canal Brasil. Each Monday, Ramos interviewed significant Brazilian figures, discussing daily themes of Brazilian life. One interview in 2013 with Brazilian rapper Criolo went viral when the performer expressed his indignation with the political climate of Brazil, putting a spotlight on Ramos' programming.

== Brazilian Celebrity ==
Lázaro Ramos was considered by Revista Época one of the 100 most influential Brazilians of the years 2007 and 2009. In the same year, Ramos served as the 5th presenter of the 5th edition of the Prêmio BRAVO, Bradesco de Cultura. In 2011 Ramos received the prize of Camélia da Liberdade in the category of "Press" as a figure who promoted socially inclusive actions for afro-descendant individuals.

== Personal life ==
Ramos is married to Taís Araújo, a Brazilian actress and TV host. Ramos an Araújo met in the end of the year 2004, while Araújo was engaged to another man. After the end of her former relationship, they began dating and got engaged the following year. In 2006, they appeared opposite each other for the first time in the TV series Cobras & Lagartos. They separated in 2008, but had reconciled with one another by the end of the same year. They have two children, João Vicente de Araújo Ramos (born on June 18th, 2011) and Maria Antônia (born on January 21, 2015).

== Filmography ==
=== Television ===
Year	Title	Role	Notes
2002	Pastores da Noite	Massu	
2003	Cena Aberta	Negro Bonifácio	
2003	Fantástico		Special participation Segment: "O Homem Objeto"
2003	A Grande Família	Alemão	Episode: "Quem Vai Ficar com Mário?"
2003	Carga Pesada	Negão	Episode: "Companheiros"
2004	Carandiru, Outras Histórias	Ezequiel	
2004	Sexo Frágil	Fred / Priscila	
2004	Programa Novo	Fred / Priscila	
2005	Levando a Vida	Formiga	
2005	Fantástico		Eventual presenter Segments: "Instinto Humano / Os 5 Sentidos"
2006	Cobras & Lagartos	Daniel Miranda Café (Foguinho)	
2006	Fantástico	Avareza	Special participation Segment: "Os 7 Pecados Capitais"
2007	Duas Caras	Evilásio Caó	
2008	Ó Paí, Ó	Roque	
2009	Decamerão - A Comédia do Sexo	Monge Masetto	
2009	Ó Paí, Ó	Roque	
2009	Dó-Ré-Mi-Fábrica	Ludovico / Arquimedes	
2010	Passione	Himself	Special participation
2010	Fantástico	Himself	Eventual presenter and director Segment: "O Curioso"
2011	Insensato Coração	André Gurgel	
2012	Lado a Lado	Zé Maria dos Santos	
2013	O Dentista Mascarado	Himself	Special participation
2014	Doce de Mãe	Francis Farmer	Special participation
2014	A Grande Família	Agostinho Carrara	Episode: "Um"
2014	Geração Brasil	Brian Roberto Benson	
2015	Criança Esperança	Himself	Presenter
2015–2018	Mister Brau	Mister (Mr.) Brau / Braúlio	
2021	Amor de Mãe	Narrator	Episode: "15 March"
2023	Elas por Elas	Mário Fofoca	
2026	A Nobreza do Amor	Jendal Trabelsi, Duke of Batanga	

=== Film ===
Year	Title	Role	Notes
1995	Jenipapo		
1998	Cinderela Baiana	Chico	
2000	Woman on Top	Max	
2002	As três Marias	Catrevagem	
2002	Madame Satã	João Francisco dos Santos / Madame Satã	
2003	Carandiru	Ezequiel	
2003	O Homem do Ano	Marcão	
2003	O Homem que Copiava	André	
2004	Meu Tio Matou um Cara	Éder	
2004	Nina	Painter	
2004	TheLastNote.com	Lázaro	
2005	A Máquina	Doido Cético	
2005	Cafundó	João de Camargo	
2005	Cidade Baixa	Deco	
2005	Desejo	Edmilson	
2005	Quanto Vale ou É por Quilo?	Kidnapper	
2006	O Cobrador	C	
2007	Ó Paí, Ó	Roque	
2007	Saneamento Básico	Zico	
2011	Amanhã Nunca Mais	Dr. Walter	
2011	Priscilla Drag, Eu sou Rica!	Himself	
2012	Marighella	Narrator	Documentary
2012	The Great Kilapy	Joãozinho (João Fraga)	
2013	Acorda Brasil	Laerte	
2014	The Adventures of the Red Airplane	Chocolate	Voice only
2015	O Vendedor de Passados	Vicente	
2015	Sorria, Você Está Sendo Filmado - O Filme	Geneton	
2018	The Grinch	Grinch	Brazilian dub
2019	Spies in Disguise	Lance Sterling	Brazilian dub
2020	O Silêncio da Chuva	Espinosa	
2026	Gugu's World	Batista	
2026	Velhos Bandidos	Oswaldo Aranha	

=== As director ===
Year	Title	Notes
2006–present	Espelho	Also presenter
2006	Zózimo Bulbul	Documentary
2011	Namíbia, não!	
2020	Executive Order	

== Awards and nominations ==
Year	Awards	Category	Nominated work	Result	Notes
2002	Mostra Internacional de Cinema de São Paulo	Best Actor	Madame Satã	Won	
2002	Festival de Cinema Ibero-Americano de Huelva	Best Actor	Madame Satã	Won	
2002	Festival Internacional de Cinema de Cuenca	Best Actor	Madame Satã	Won	
2003	Troféu APCA	Best Actor	Madame Satã	Won	
2003	Festival SESC Melhores Filmes	Best Actor	Madame Satã	Won	
2003	Prêmio Qualidade Brasil	Best Actor	O Homem que Copiava	Nominated	
2003	Grande Prêmio Cinema Brasil	Best Actor	Madame Satã	Won	
2003	Festival de Havana	Best Actor	O Homem que Copiava	Won	
2003	Festival de Cinema de Lima	Best Actor	Madame Satã	Won	
2003	Festival Internacional du Film d'Amour de Mons	Best Actor	Madame Satã	Won	
2003	Festival Internacional de Cinema de Santo Domingo	Best Actor	Madame Satã	Won	
2003	Festival Internacional de Cinema de Valdivia	Best Actor	Madame Satã	Won	
2004	Festival SESC Melhores Filmes	Best Actor	O Homem que Copiava	Won	
2004	Grande Prêmio Cinema Brasil	Best Actor	O Homem que Copiava	Nominated	
2004	Festival Internacional de Cinema de Cartagena	Best Co-starring Actor	Carandiru	Won	with other actors and actresses in the production
2005	Grande Prêmio Cinema Brasil	Best Actor	Meu Tio Matou um Cara	Nominated	
2005	Prêmio Qualidade Brasil	Best Actor	Meu Tio Matou um Cara	Nominated	
2005	Prêmio Qualidade Brasil	Best Actor	Meu Tio Matou um Cara	Won	Together with Ângelo Antônio
2005	Cine Ceará	Best Co-starring Actor	Quanto Vale ou É por Quilo?	Won	
2005	Prêmio José Lewgoy do Cinema Gaúcho	Best Actor	Meu Tio Matou um Cara	Won	
2005	Festival de Gramado	Kikito (Actor)	Cafundó	Won	
2006	Prêmio Contigo de Cinema Nacional	Best Actor	Cidade Baixa	Nominated	
2006	Prêmio ACIE de Cinema	Best Actor	[Cidade Baixa	Nominated	
2006	Prêmio Extra de Televisão	Melhor Ator	Cobras & Lagartos	Won	
2006	Prêmio Faz Diferença	Revista da TV	—	Won	with Carolina Dieckmann
2006	Troféu Raça Negra	Prêmio especial	Cobras & Lagartos	Won	
2006	Festival de Cinema Brasileiro de Miami	Best Actor	Cidade Baixa	Nominated	
2006	Melhores do Ano	Melhor Ator	Cobras & Lagartos	Won	
2007	Troféu APCA	Melhor Ator	Cobras & Lagartos	Won	
2007	Troféu Imprensa	Melhor Ator	Cobras & Lagartos	Nominated	
2007	Troféu Internet	Best Actor	Cobras & Lagartos	Won	
2007	Prêmio Contigo! de TV	Melhor Par Romântico	Cobras & Lagartos	Nominated	with Taís Araújo
2007	Prêmio Contigo! de TV	Best Actor	Cobras & Lagartos	Nominated	
2007	Prêmio Qualidade Brasil	Best Actor	Ó Paí, Ó	Nominated	
2007	Grande Prêmio Cinema Brasil	Best Co-starring Actor	Cidade Baixa	Nominated	
2007	Grande Prêmio Cinema Brasil	Best Actor	A Máquina	Nominated	
2007	Meus Prêmios Nick	Favourite Actor	Cobras & Lagartos	Won	
2007	Emmy Internacional	Best Actor	Cobras & Lagartos	Nominated	
2008	Troféu Imprensa	Best Actor	Duas Caras	Nominated	
2008	Prêmio Contigo! de TV	Best Romantic Couple	Duas Caras	Nominated	with Débora Falabella
2008	Grande Prêmio Cinema Brasil	Best Actor	Ó Paí, Ó	Nominated	
2008	Prêmio Festnatal	Best Actor	Duas Caras	Nominated	
2008	Troféu Super Cap De Ouro	Best Actor	Duas Caras	Won	
2008	Prémio Ariel	Best Actor	O Cobrador	Nominated	
2009	Prêmio Qualidade Brasil	Best Actor in a Series	Ó Paí, Ó	Won	
2009	Prêmio Contigo! de TV	Melhor Ator Cômico	Ó Paí, Ó	Nominated	
2013	Prêmio Extra de Televisão	Best Actor	Lado a Lado	Nominated	
2013	Festival de Cinema Itinerante da Língua Portuguesa	Best Actor	O Grande Kilapy	Won	
2014	Melhores do Ano	Melhor Ator Coadjuvante	Geração Brasil	Nominated	
2018	International Filmmaker Festival of New York	outstanding achievement in acting	THE KISS	Won	
2018	International Filmmaker Festival of New York	Best actor	THE KISS	Nominated	

== See also ==
- Afro-Brazilians
