= Constitución =

Constitución is Spanish for "constitution" and may refer to:

== Geography ==
Argentina

- Constitución, Buenos Aires, a neighborhood in central Buenos Aires, where the Estación Constitución railway station is located
- Constitución Department, Santa Fe, an administrative subdivision of Santa Fe Province
- Constitución railway station, a railway station and subway station in Buenos Aires
  - Constitución (Line C Buenos Aires Underground)
  - Constitución (Line E Buenos Aires Underground)
- Villa Constitución, a city in Santa Fe Province and head town of the Constitución Department

Chile

- Constitución, Chile

Mexico

- Ciudad Constitución, in Baja California Sur

Peru

- Ciudad Constitución, Peru

== Ships ==
- Chilean battleship Constitución (1903), laid down in the UK for Chile, but purchased by the UK and renamed HMS Swiftsure
