= HMS Constitution =

Only one ship of the Royal Navy has borne the name HMS Constitution. HMS Constitution was a schooner that the Royal Navy purchased on 24 August 1835. She was no longer listed in 1837.

== See also ==
- HM hired armed cutter Constitution
