= Agar Town =

Short-lived area of St Pancras in central London

Coordinates: 51°32′20″N 0°7′55″W

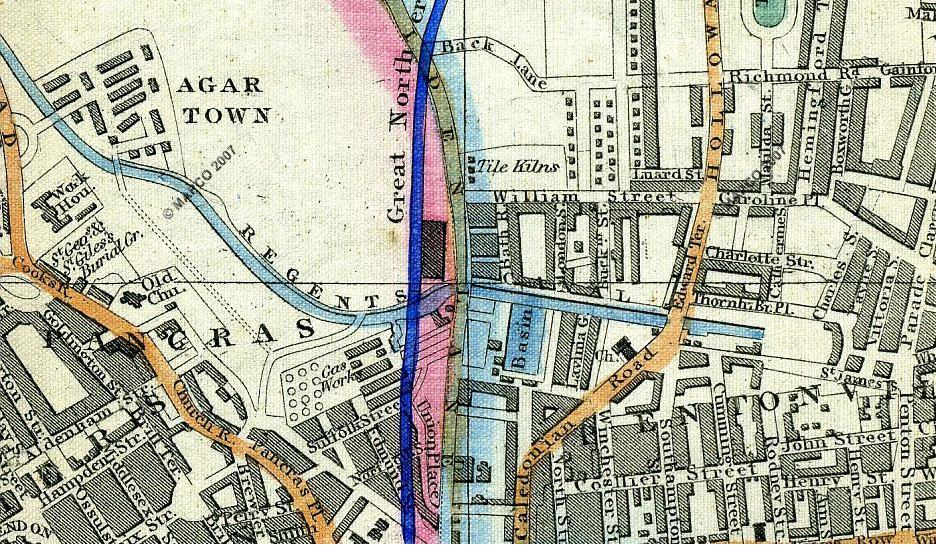
1851 map showing Agar Town (top left), Somers Town and Pentonville.

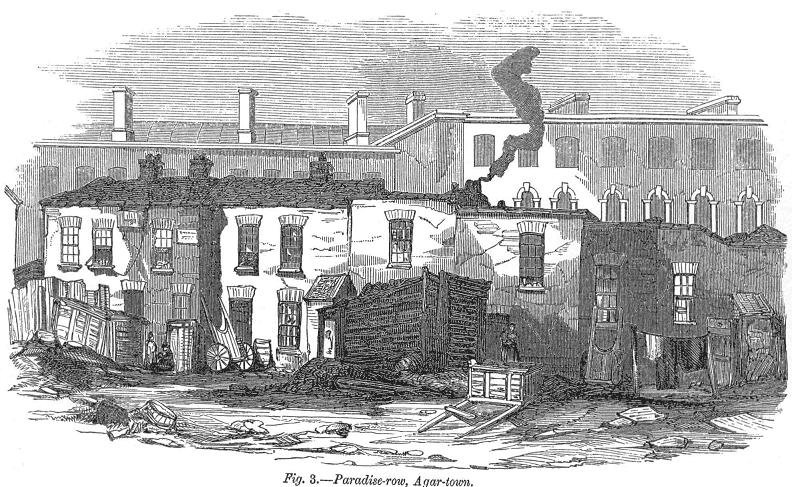
Illustration from 1854, showing Paradise Row in Agar Town

Agar Town (also known as Ague Town, Hagar Town, Agar-Town and Agar-town) was a small, historically poor neighbourhood of St Pancras in central London. Most of the area was demolished making way for St Pancras railway station.

== History ==
The area was named after William Agar, a wealthy lawyer who lived at Elm Lodge, a villa in large grounds near to the Regent's Canal roughly where Barker Drive stands. Key streets were Canterbury Place, Durham Street, and one of the city's Oxford Crescents. The area contained low-quality housing for the poor and labourers building the houses, made of the lowest quality materials on 21-year leases, with no street lighting, cleaning or sewerage. Consequently, Agar Town was generally considered a slum. This designation has been questioned.

The neighbourhood was started in 1841 with Agar's widow leasing out small plots on the north side of the canal. Ownership passed to the Church Commissioners, who sold it to the Midland Railway. The company demolished most of the housing to make way for warehouses supplying St Pancras railway station from 1866.

The Church of St Thomas was built in 1864, just as development of the railway was already underway, and demolished in 1953.

The name of Agar Town is commemorated by Agar Grove which traces an edge and which was St Paul's Road in Camden Town. Residential building occurred in the 1960s, including the tower block "Lulworth House". In recent years, there has been further redevelopment.

The oldest remaining building of Agar Town is The Constitution public house.

== Cultural reference ==
The folk song The River Don't Run written by Richard Guard and Anna Crockatt and performed by Nick Hart describes the demolition of Agar Town and the disappearance of part of the River Fleet as it was diverted underground to make way for railway.

== See also ==
- Camley Street Natural Park
- Camden Town Murder
