= Rory Wilmot =

British child actor

- Occupation: Actor
- Years active: 2024–present

Rory Wilmot is a British child actor. He is known for his roles as Anthony Harrison in the Netflix television series Unchosen and Noah in the film The Runner. He is also set to portray Neville Longbottom in the HBO television series Harry Potter.

== Early life ==
Wilmot is from Yorkshire and began developing his acting career at a young age. He has trained at Articulate Drama School and Agency, which is based in Yorkshire.

== Career ==
Wilmot made an early television appearance in the CBS series FBI: International, portraying Edvard Lassen in an episode of the third season in 2024.

In 2026, Wilmot appeared as Anthony Harrison in six episodes of the Netflix psychological thriller series Unchosen alongside Asa Butterfield and Fra Fee.

Wilmot appeared in Amazon Prime Video's, The Runner portraying Noah alongside Gal Gadot.

On July 14, 2025, Wilmot was announced as part of the cast of Harry Potter, an HBO television adaptation of J. K. Rowling's Harry Potter book series. He was cast as Neville Longbottom, a Gryffindor student and friend of Harry Potter.

== Filmography ==
=== Film ===
Year	Title	Role
2026	The Runner	Noah

=== Television ===
Year	Title	Role	Notes
2024	FBI: International	Edvard Lassen	1 episode
2026	Unchosen	Anthony Harrison	6 episodes
2026	Harry Potter	Neville Longbottom	Upcoming
