= The Constitution (pub) =

Pub in Camden Town, London

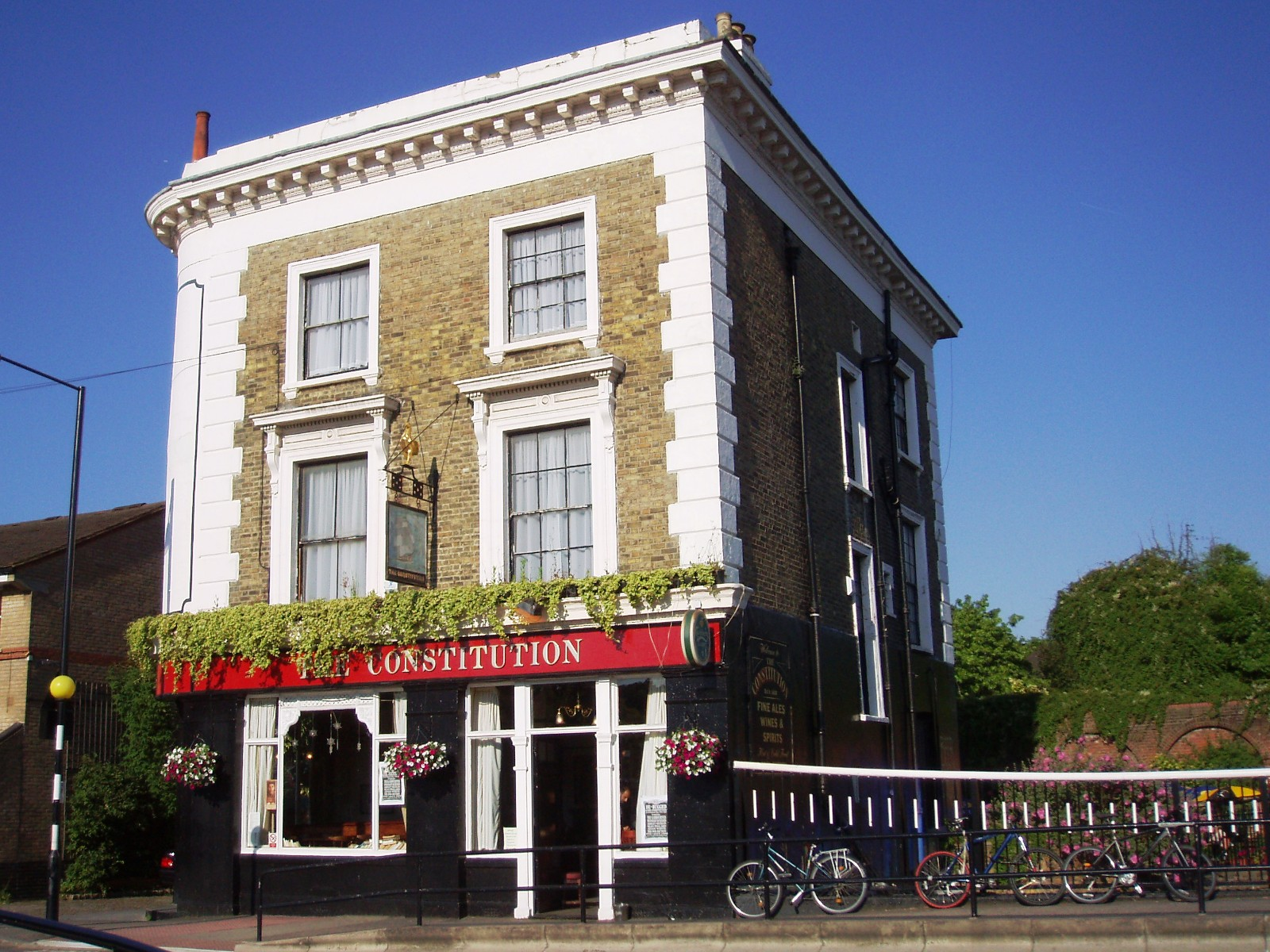
- The Constitution pub, photogrqphed in 2008

- Location within London Borough of Camden Location within Greater London

General information
- Location: 42 St Pancras Way, London NW1 0QT, United Kingdom, London, England
- Coordinates: 51.5403°N 0.1355°W

Website
- theconstitutioncamden.co.uk

The Constitution is a long-established public house on St Pancras Way in Camden Town, London, owned by Young's Brewery. Opened in 1858 in what was then Agar Town, it overlooks Regent's Canal.

It has been described as "cheap and cheerful" and a "lovely local backstreet boozer".

Pubs of Distinction acquired the pub in 2015 before putting it up for sale in 2019. In 2020, it was acquired by Young's Brewery, who suddenly closed it down. It remained empty for three years until work began on restoring it in July 2023.

Following the renovation work, it was reopened in 2024.
